= List of people with dwarfism =

Portrait of Sebastián de Morra, Diego Velázquez

The Ovitz family was a family of Hungarian Jewish actors/traveling musicians originating from present Romania, who survived imprisonment at the Auschwitz concentration camp during World War II. Most of them were dwarfs. They were the largest family of dwarfs ever recorded and were the largest family to enter Auschwitz and survive intact; the family of twelve ranged from a 15-month-old baby to a 58-year-old woman.

The following is a list of people who are known for their dwarfism and who have been open about it. While these people are not known for being the shortest ever, they have been mentioned in sources describing how the condition has affected their lives. Dwarfism is caused by several different types of medical conditions, and is typically defined as an adult^{A} with a height of 147 cm (4 ft 10 in) or less. Records or mentions of people with dwarfism have not always been kept well, resulting in estimated heights that were taken from eyewitnesses. In some given cases the height of the person is unknown except to say that they were mentioned as a "dwarf" in various media. This list does not include every prominent person with dwarfism, as others are already included on other linked Wikipedia lists.

== Actors and actresses ==
Living

Nationality	Height	Name	Note	Lifespan
India	62.8 cm (24.7 in)	Jyoti Amge	Actress known for holding the Guinness World Record for shortest living woman, and for starring in American Horror Story: Freak Show.	1993–
Dominican Republic	71 cm (28 in)	Nelson de la Rosa	Actor (known as Mahow) who starred in the Italian horror film Ratman.	c. 1967/1968–2006
India	76 cm (30 in)	Ajay Kumar	Indian actor and director known for holding the Guinness World Records for being the shortest actor to play a character in a full-length film.	1976–
United States	81 cm (32 in)	Verne Troyer	American actor and stunt performer best known for playing Mini-Me in the Austin Powers series of comedy films.	1969–2018
Canada	81 cm (32 in)	Linden Porco	Canadian actor, known for playing a body double for Marlon Wayans' character in Little Man.	1996–
Philippines	83 cm (33 in)	Ernesto de la Cruz	Actor, stunt performer and martial artist (known by the stage name Weng Weng), who played the leading role in the 1981 spy film For Y'ur Height Only.	1957–1992
Hungary	84 cm (33 in)	Michu Meszaros	Hungarian performer in the Ringling Bros. and Barnum & Bailey Circus.	1939–2016
United States	86 cm (34 in)	Pat Bilon	Known for his performances in Under the Rainbow, and one of two dwarfs hired for the role of E.T. the Extra-Terrestrial (body suit).	1947–1983
United States	89 cm (35 in)	Angelo Rossitto	Angelo was an American actor that was billed as "Little Angie" or "Moe". He was one of the actors in a classic horror movie Freaks.	1908–1991
Indonesia	91 cm (36 in)	Ucok Baba	Actor and Comedian.	1971–
United States	91 cm (36 in)	Eric Lynch	American actor, writer and former member of The Howard Stern Show's Wack Pack.	1975–2014
United States	97 cm (38 in)	Josh Ryan Evans	American actor with achondroplasia, known for his role as Timmy Lenox from the TV series Passions.	1982–2002
United States	97 cm (38 in)	Mikey Post		1982–2018
United Kingdom	104 cm (41 in)	Annabelle Davis	British actress known for her role as Sasha Bellman in The Dumping Ground. She is the daughter of actor and TV presenter Warwick Davis and Samantha Davis.	1997–
Indonesia	107 cm (42 in)	Daus Mini	Actor and Comedian.	1987–
United States	107 cm (42 in)	Tony Cox	American actor known for his roles in Bad Santa, Me, Myself and Irene, Date Movie, Epic Movie and Disaster Movie.	1958–
United States	106 cm (42 in)	Phil Fondacaro	Fondacaro appeared in Star Wars Return of the Jedi as an Ewok, the only one to have a death scene.	1958–
United Kingdom	107 cm (42 in)	Warwick Davis	British actor with spondyloepiphyseal dysplasia congenita. Davis is known for his role as Wicket W. Warrick from the Star Wars series.	1970–
Australia	114 cm (45 in)	Kiruna Stamell	Australian actress who received her first major role in the movie Moulin Rouge! as "La Petite Princesse".	1981–
Japan	109 cm (43 in)	Kohey Nishi	Former Japanese adult actor.	1993–
United States	109 cm (43 in)	Michael J. Anderson	American actor known for his roles as "The Man from Another Place" in the series Twin Peaks.	1953–
United Kingdom	112 cm (44 in)	Kenny Baker	English actor who originally portrayed R2-D2 in the Star Wars series.	1934–2016
United Kingdom	110 cm (43 in)	Jimmy Vee	Scottish actor who has portrayed R2-D2 in Star Wars: Episode VII and beyond.	1959–
United States	114 cm (45 in)	Billy Barty	American actor with cartilage–hair hypoplasia, who had multiple roles in film from 1927 until his death.	1924–2000
United States	114 cm (45 in)	Bridget Powers	American pornographic actress also known as "Bridget the Midget".	1980–
United States	115 cm (45 in)	Mark Povinelli	American actor known for roles in Water for Elephants and The Polar Express.	1971–
India	115 cm (45 in)	KK Goswami		1973–
United States	116.8 cm (46.0 in)	Michael Dunn	Oscar-nominated (for Best Supporting Actor in Ship of Fools) American actor with spondyloepiphyseal dysplasia, type unspecified.	1934–1973
United States	119 cm (47 in)	Patty Maloney	Maloney is an American actress who portrayed Honk from Far Out Space Nuts.	1936–2025
United Kingdom	119 cm (47 in)	Mick Walter	English actor who is known for his roles in television comedies.	1955–
United States	119.3 cm (47.0 in)	Johnny Roventini	Spokesperson for Phillip Morris USA.	1910–1998
Italy	119.3 cm (47.0 in)	Felix Silla	Italian-American actor best known for his portrayal as Cousin Itt (voiced by Tony Magro) from the original 1964 TV series, The Addams Family.	1937–2021
France	119.3 cm (47.0 in)	Hervé Villechaize	French-born actor, known for roles in The Man with the Golden Gun and Fantasy Island.	1943–1993
United Kingdom	119.3 cm (47.0 in)	David Rappaport	Rappaport was a British actor who is known for his roles in the films Time Bandits and The Bride.	1951–1990
Czech Republic	120 cm (47 in)	Aťka Janoušková	Prolific voice actress best known for her dub of the titular character in Maya the Honey Bee.	1930–2019
Italy	120 cm (47 in)	Oliviero Migliore	Pornographic actor known by the stage name Holly One.	1965–2006
United States	121.9 cm (48.0 in)	Michael Gilden	American actor who starred in the TV series NCIS.	1962–2006
United States	121.9 cm (48.0 in)	Danny Woodburn	American actor who is noted for the role on the TV comedy series Seinfeld, as Mickey Abbott.	1964–
Czech Republic	122 cm (48 in)	Jiří Krytinář	Actor with osteochondrodysplasia who had been featured in Czech and American films.	1947–2015
United States	122 cm (48 in)	Erika Calabrese	OnlyFans model who is part of the Mini Bop House social media content creation group.	2000-
United States	122 cm (48 in)	Shorty Rossi	Star of Pit Boss, and owner of Shortywood Productions.	1969–
United States	122 cm (48 in)	Meredith Eaton	American actress known for portraying the attorney Emily Resnick on the CBS television series Family Law (in which she was the first woman with dwarfism to fill a regular role in an American prime time series), for her recurring role as Bethany Horowitz on the ABC series Boston Legal, and for her lead role as Matilda Webber on the CBS series MacGyver.	1974–
United States	123 cm (48 in)	Jason Acuña	Acuña is an American skateboarder with achondroplasia who is also known as "Wee-Man." He is one of the stars in the TV series Jackass.	1973–
United States	124.4 cm (49.0 in)	Martin Klebba	American actor best known for his role as Marty in the Pirates of the Caribbean franchise.	1969–
India	124.5 cm (49.0 in)	Juhi Aslam	Television actress known for starring in Baba Aiso Varr Dhoondo, a show about a woman with dwarfism.	1991–
Indonesia	125 cm (49 in)	Adul	Actor and Comedian.	1983–
United States	127 cm (50 in)	Matthew Roloff	Roloff is an American actor, author, and businessman with diastrophic dysplasia. He was featured on the TV show Little People Big World.	1961–
Japan	128 cm (50 in)	Daiki	Actor in Dear Radiance and dancer.	1994-
Mexico	128.27 cm (50.50 in)	María Elena Saldaña	Mexican actress and comedienne, best known for her role on several Televisa series as La Güereja.	1963-
United States	129.5 cm (51.0 in)	Zelda Rubinstein	American actress, best known for her role in Poltergeist as the medium Tangina Barrons.	1933–2010
United States	129.54 cm (51.00 in)	Sofiya Cheyenne	Sofiya is an actress and active disability advocate in the arts. She has SEDc type dwarfism. Best known for her recurring role as Louise in Loudermilk (2018–2020).	1991–
Indonesia	130 cm (51 in)	Megi Irawan	Indonesian actor.	1996–
Malta	130 cm (51 in)	Angelo Muscat	Maltese English actor, best known for playing The Butler in The Prisoner.	1930–1977
Russia	130 cm (51 in)	Vladimir Fyodorov	Soviet and Russian actor, known for playing Chernomor in Ruslan and Ludmila.	1939–2021
Mexico	130 cm (51 in)	Chuy Bravo	Known for his sidekick role on the talk show Chelsea Lately.	1956–2019
France	132 cm (52 in)	Mimie Mathy	French actress and comedian who is best known for her role in the Josephine, Guardian Angel television series.	1957–
United Kingdom	132 cm (52 in)	Eric Cullen	Cullen was a Scottish actor with achondroplasia who was known for his role as "Wee Burney" in BBC's Rab C Nesbitt.	1965–1996
United States	132 cm (52 in)	Ben Woolf	Actor with pituitary dwarfism who was known for his roles in American Horror Story.	1980–2015
United States	135 cm (53 in)	Peter Dinklage	Dinklage is an Emmy-winning American actor with achondroplasia. He has starred in The Station Agent, Game of Thrones and X-Men: Days of Future Past.	1969–
United States	136 cm (54 in)	Dick Beals	Beals specialized in doing the voices of young boys, although he was also hired to voice young female children.	1927–2012
Canada	137 cm (54 in)	Rick Howland	Actor in Lost Girl.	1969-
United States	145 cm (57 in)	Linda Hunt	American actress who won the Academy Award for Best Supporting Actress for playing Billy Kwan in The Year of Living Dangerously. She also played Shadout Mapes in David Lynch's adaptation of Dune.	1945–
Turkey	—N/a	Köksal Baba	Turkish actor and YouTuber.	1975–
Syria	—N/a	John George		1898–1968
United States	—N/a	George Brasno	Actor and vaudeville star in a brother-sister act with Olive Brasno.	1911–1982
United States	—N/a	Olive Brasno	Actress and vaudeville star in a brother-sister act with George Brasno.	1917–1998
United Kingdom	—N/a	George Claydon		1933–2001
Cuba	—N/a	Luis Aguad Jorge	Actor known for starring in the Puerto Rican television show La Criada Malcriada, and for being their national spokesperson for Holsum Bread.	1925–2007
Austria	—N/a	Fritz Hakl		1932–2012
Cambodia	—N/a	Suon Bou	Actor (known as Loto) who was well known in Cambodian film for his comedic roles.	1936–2006
Spain	—N/a	Martí Galindo	Theatre actor known for his appearances on the Spanish late night talk show Crónicas marcianas.	1937–2019
Indonesia	—N/a	Ateng	Actor known for playing comedic roles in Indonesian film and television.	1942–2003
United Kingdom	—N/a	Mike Edmonds	British actor in Maid Marian and her Merry Men, Time Bandits, and "The Safety Dance" video.	1944–
Canada	—N/a	Guy Big	Canadian actor best known for his role in the children's television series The Hilarious House of Frightenstein as the Midget Count.	1946–1978
United Kingdom	—N/a	Malcolm Dixon	British actor known for his role in the feature film Time Bandits.	1953–2020
Philippines	—N/a	Romy Pastrana	Pastrana (Dagul as his stage name) is a Filipino dwarf actor who does roles on the children's gag show Goin' Bulilit, he is the only adult actor.	1958–
Philippines	—N/a	Allan Padua	Actor and comedian (Mura as his stage name) who has appeared in various Filipino films.	1969–
Canada	—N/a	Jordan Prentice	Canadian actor, who appeared in In Bruges.	1973–
Philippines	—N/a	Noemi Tesorero	Tesorero (Mahal as her stage name) is a Filipina dwarf actress, comedian and vlogger.	1974–2021
Nigeria	—N/a	Chinedu Ikedieze	Ikedieze is best known for playing alongside Osita Iheme in most movies after their breakthrough in Aki na Ukwa.	1977–
Nigeria	—N/a	Osita Iheme	Iheme is known for his nickname "PawPaw", which he adopted after the role he played of the same name in the film Aki na Ukwa.	1982–
United Kingdom	—N/a	Lisa Hammond	British actress known for her roles in television series EastEnders and Max and Paddy's Road to Nowhere.	1983–
Samoa	—N/a	Fa'afiaula Sagote	Samoan actor who played the lead role in his country's first ever feature film, The Orator (2011).	1980s–2022
Philippines	—N/a	Josephine Bibit Berry	Berry (Jo Berry as her stage name) is a Filipina dwarf actress from GMA Network. She was known for her role "Onay" in Onanay, "Princess R. Montivano" in Little Princess, and "Lilet Mercado-Matias" in Lilet Matias: Attorney-at-Law.	1994–
New Zealand	—N/a	Sam Humphrey	Actor known for playing General Tom Thumb in the 2017 film The Greatest Showman.	1994–
Australia	—N/a	Quaden Bayles	Murri child actor known for his roles in Three Thousand Years of Longing and Furiosa: A Mad Max Saga.	2010–
Pakistan	—N/a	Javed Kodu	Actor who had many Punjab and Urdu language film and television roles.	1960–2025
Algeria	—N/a	Jimmy Karoubi	Actor known for starring in the 1955 film The Woman for Joe, and for being part of boxer Sugar Ray Robinson's entourage.	Unknown
(Democratic Republic of the Congo) DR Congo	—N/a	Cécile Bayiha	Bayiha is best known for playing the part of captive Pygmy Likola in the 2005 Franco-British-South African film Man to Man.	Unknown

== Artists and writers ==
Deceased Living

Nationality	Height	Name	Note	Lifespan
United States	106.6 cm (42.0 in)^{B}	Judy-Lynn del Rey	American science fiction editor.	1943–1986
England	116.8 cm (46.0 in)	Richard Gibson (painter)	17th century painter of portrait miniatures.	1615–1690
France	142 cm (56 in)	Henri de Toulouse-Lautrec	French painter	1864–1901
Holy Roman Empire	—N/a	François de Cuvilliés	Flemish architect noted for Cuvilliés Theatre.	1695–1768

== Athletes ==
Deceased Living

Nationality	Height	Name	Sport	Note	Lifespan
India	104 cm (41 in)	Joby Mathew	Arm wrestling	Multiple gold medallist at the World Dwarf Games	1976 –
United States	115 cm (45 in)	Juli Windsor	Runner	Windsor was among the first dwarfs to complete the Boston Marathon after first trying in 2013. While she was unable to finish that year due to the bombing, she accomplished her goal in 2014.	1987–
Japan	122 cm (48 in)	Shigeru Akabane	Professional Wrestling	Best known under his ring name Little Tokyo, was a Japanese professional midget wrestler who competed in North American promotions from the 1970s into the 1990s	1941–2011
United Kingdom	123 cm (48 in)	Ellie Simmonds	Paralympic Swimmer	Multiple gold medallist and world record holder in Paralympic swimming events.	1994–
Nigeria	125 cm (49 in)	Lauritta Onye	Paralympic athlete	Onya won gold in shot put at the 2016 Summer Paralympics, and 2015 IPC Athletics World Championships.	1984–
Australia	129 cm (51 in)	Kate Wilson	Paralympic swimmer	Wilson represented Australia at the 2016 Rio Paralympics.	1998–
United States	132 cm (52 in)	Rico Abreu	Auto racing	NASCAR driver.	1992–
Turkey	132 cm (52 in)	Özlem Kaya	Paralympic swimmer	Kaya participated in the 2011 European Championships where she won bronze in the 100m Breaststroke.	1992–
United Kingdom	140 cm (55 in)	Kyron Duke	Paralympic athlete	Duke took part in the 2010 Commonwealth Games among other events where he won bronze and silver medals.	1992–
Turkey	—N/a	Çiğdem Dede	Paralympic athlete	Dede won a silver medal at the 2012 Paralympics in powerlifting.	1980–
Australia	—N/a	Sarah Bowen	Paralympic swimmer	Bowen has won two gold, and two silver Olympic medals.	1984–
Australia	—N/a	Sarah Rose	Paralympic swimmer		1986–
United Kingdom	—N/a	Holly Neill	Paralympic athlete		1989–
Australia	—N/a	Claire Keefer	Paralympic athlete		1995–
Australia	—N/a	Tiffany T. Kane	Paralympic swimmer		2001–

== Entertainers ==
The names here include circus performers, comedians, reality TV stars, and occupations that do not primarily involve acting in films.

Living

Nationality	Height	Name	Type	Note	Lifespan
China	71 cm (28 in)	Che-Mah	Circus performer	Born in China, brought to the U.S. with Barnum & Bailey in 1881. Retired in Knox, Indiana.	1838–1926
United States	81 cm (32 in)	Lavinia Warren	Circus performer	Warren performed in the circus with her husband Charles Stratton (see below) under P. T. Barnum.	1841–1919
Italy	81 cm (32 in)	Count Primo Magri	Circus performer	Stage name of the second husband of Lavinia Warren.	1849–1920
France	86 cm (34 in)	Nicolas Ferry	Court dwarf	French court dwarf nicknamed "Bébé" of the Polish king Stanisław Leszczyński.	1741–1764
United States	91 cm (36 in)^{C}	Charles Sherwood Stratton	Circus performer	Also known as "General Tom Thumb", he gained fame under P. T. Barnum who exaggerated his short height to be 64 cm (25 in).	1838–1883
United States	91 cm (36 in)^{D}	Thomas Dilward	Stage actor	Nineteenth-century minstrel show entertainer.	1840–1902
England	100 cm (39 in)^{B}	Jeffrey Hudson	Court dwarf	English court dwarf and jester to Charles I.	1619–1682
Russia	102 cm (40 in)	Hasbulla	Internet personality	Russian social media personality.	2002–
Holy Roman Empire	104 cm (41 in)	Hedsor Conrad Ernest Coppernin	Court dwarf	Served as a page to Princess Augusta of Saxe-Gotha making him the last court dwarf.	18th century
United States	106 cm (42 in)	Evan Eckenrode	Internet Personality	Eckenrode grew to fame on the social media platform Vine before moving his career to work alongside social media star Logan Paul.	1997–
United States	106.6 cm (42.0 in)	George Washington Morrison Nutt	Circus performer	Known as "Commodore Nutt".	1848–1881
United Kingdom	106.6 cm (42.0 in)	Billy Merchant	Circus performer	British circus entertainer.	1919–2001
Australia	107 cm (42 in)	Imaan Hadchiti	Comedian	Lebanese–Australian standup comedian and actor known for being one of two known cases of his form of dwarfism, alongside his sister.	Unknown
United States	115 cm (45 in)	Pee Wee Marquette	Comedian	Master of ceremonies at the original Birdland jazz club.	1914–1992
United States	117 cm (46 in)	Frankie Saluto	Circus performer	Saluto performed for over four decades with the Ringling Brothers circus.	1906–1982
Syria	122 cm (48 in)	Charla Baklayan Faddoul	Reality TV	American (Syrian born) The Amazing Race contestant (Seasons 5 and 11).	1976–
Japan	124 cm (49 in)	Chibimoeko	Dancer and internet celebrity	She is Japan’s first burlesque dancer with dwarfism.	N/A
United States	124.4 cm (49.0 in)	Henry Joseph Nasiff Jr.	Radio personality	American entertainer who frequently appeared on The Howard Stern Show.	1962–2001
United Kingdom	129.5 cm (51.0 in)	Jimmy Clitheroe	Comedian	British comedian called "The Clitheroe Kid".	1921–1973
United States	129.5 cm (51.0 in)	Lester "Beetlejuice" Green	Comedian	Entertainer known for his appearances on The Howard Stern Show.	1968–
United States	132 cm (52 in)	Brad Williams	Comedian	American comedian and radio personality.	1984–
United States	142.24 cm (56.00 in)	Marjorie Johnson	Baker	American popular baker and talk show guest. Correspondent for The Tonight Show with Jay Leno.	1919–2025
United Kingdom	145 cm (57 in)	Wee Georgie Wood	Comedian	Comic actor with a railway named after him, and an Australian rhyming slang term adopted from his name ("wee georgie").	1894–1979
Tuscany	—N/a	Braccio di Bartolo	Court jester	Member of the court of Cosimo I de' Medici, nicknamed Nano Morgante.	16th century
United States	—N/a	Marshall P. Wilder	Comedian	American comedian.	1859–1915

== Musicians/singers ==
Deceased Living

Nationality	Height	Name	Note	Lifespan
Germany	134 cm (53 in)	Thomas Quasthoff	Bass-baritone classical singer.	1959–
Russia	130.0 cm (51.2 in)	Olympia Ivleva	Russian musician and founding member of Little Big	1990–
Brazil	111 cm (44 in)	Nelson Ned	Brazilian singer and composer.	1947–2014
United States	112 cm (44 in)	Bushwick Bill (b. Richard Shaw)	American rapper, founding member of the Geto Boys.	1966–2019
United States	114.3 cm (45.0 in)	Joe C. (Joseph Calleja)	Kid Rock's sidekick.	1974–2000
United States	124 cm (49 in)	Chick Webb	Big band drummer.	1905–1939
France	91 cm (36 in)	Michel Petrucciani	French jazz pianist.	1962–1999
Tajikistan	115 cm (45 in)	Abdu Rozik	Tajikistani Singer and Social Media.	2003–

- The Ovitz family were a family of Romanian Jewish actors/traveling musicians who survived imprisonment at the Auschwitz concentration camp during World War II. They were the largest family of dwarfs ever recorded and were the largest family (twelve family members from a 15-month-old baby to a 58-year-old woman) to enter Auschwitz and to survive intact.

== Politicians ==
Deceased Living

Nationality	Height	Name	Note	Lifespan
Norway	142 cm (56 in)	Sandra Borch	Norwegian politician with achondroplasia.	1988–
Poland	99 cm (39 in)	Józef Boruwłaski	Polish "count".	1739–1837
Australia	127 cm (50 in)	Alan Eggleston	Australian politician with achondroplasia.	1941–2025
Germany	N/A	Simone Fischer	Member of the German Bundestag.	1979–
United States	150 cm (59 in)	Robert Reich	United States Secretary of Labor with multiple epiphyseal dysplasia.	1946–
United States	114 cm (45 in)	Charley Lockhart	Texas State Treasurer.	1876-1954

- Chnoum-Hotep, ancient chief of perfumes from the Fifth dynasty of Egypt who is believed to have had achondroplasia.
- Seneb, Egyptian high-ranking court official

== Others ==
Deceased Living

Nationality	Height	Name	Note	Lifespan
Nepal	54.6 cm (21.5 in)	Chandra Bahadur Dangi	Nepalese man, recognized by the Guinness World Records as the shortest adult human ever recorded	1939–2015
Netherlands	61.0 cm (24.0 in)	Pauline Musters	Dutch woman, recognized by the Guinness World Records as the shortest woman ever recorded	1876–1895
Nepal	67 cm (26 in)	Khagendra Thapa Magar	Nepalese man, recognized by the Guinness World Records as the shortest man until 2011	1992–2020
Nepal	73.43 cm (28.91 in)	Dor Bahadur Khapangi	Nepalese man, recognized by the Guinness World Records as the shortest male teenager ever recorded	2004–
Turkey	91 cm (36 in)	Rıdvan Çelik	Born with achondroplasia (dwarfism), Çelik is approximately 91 centimeters (3 feet) tall. In addition to his work as a television actor and social media content creator in Turkey, he gained international recognition as a great hero, particularly for his volunteer efforts in searching and rescuing people from narrow spaces under the rubble during the 2020 Aegean Sea earthquake.	1991–
England	114 cm (45 in)	Anne Clowes	Reported centenarian dwarf (second longest lived next to Susanna Bokoyni), lived to be 103 years old. Lived Matlock, Derbyshire with house designed for her stature.	1681–1784
Japan	115 cm (45 in)	Hitomi Goto	Japanese model and fashioner	N/A
United States	135.0 cm (53.1 in)	Paul Steven Miller	Disability rights expert, EEOC Commissioner, professor at the University of Washington School of Law, Special Assistant to the President	1961–2010
England	137.0 cm (53.9 in)	Alexander Pope	Prominent writer, poet, translator and satirist	1688–1744
United Kingdom	N/A	John William Bean	British jeweller, news vendor and criminal who attempted to assassinate Queen Victoria, also "hunchbacked".	1824–1882
Prussia	N/A	Charles Proteus Steinmetz	German-American mathematician and electrical engineer, also "hunchbacked."	1865–1923
Netherlands	N/A	Alexander Katan	Dutch teacher and victim of Nazi experimentation who eventually became an anatomical display.	1899–1943
United Kingdom	N/A	Tom Shakespeare	Also known as Sir Thomas William Shakespeare, 3rd Baronet. A geneticist with achondroplasia.	1966–

- Sebastiano Biavati, 17th century curator of museum of curiosities
- Joyce Carpenter (December 21, 1929 – August 7, 1973), had Morquio syndrome. At 74 cm or 29 in was the shortest recorded adult in the UK in her lifetime.
- Wybrand Lolkes, Dutch watchmaker (visited Britain in 1790)

== See also ==
- List of dwarfism organisations
- Cultural depictions of dwarfism
- List of tallest people
- List of people with gigantism

== Notes ==
A. Male or Female (full grown)
B. Estimated height
C. Charles Sherwood Stratton's final height varies in reliable sources, which put it just above or near 3 feet (91cm).
D. Thomas Dilward's height was between 23 and 36 inches tall, his highest estimated height is included here.
