= Dorothea Ostrelska =

Dorothea Ostrelska (fl. 1577) also known as Dorota, Dosieczka, Doska and Dvärginnan Dorothea ('Dorothea the Female Dwarf'), was a Polish court dwarf in service of the queen of Sweden, Catherine Jagiellon.

== Life ==
Dorothea Ostrelska was likely in the service of Catherine in Poland prior to her marriage, possibly already during Catherine's childhood. Catherine's sister, Sophia, also had a female dwarf as personal attendant: Agnieszka, whose position mirrored that of Dorothea.

She belonged to the Polish retinue accompanying Catherine from Poland to Finland upon the marriage of Catherine to Duke John in 1562. She was one of sixteen women and one of four dwarfs (the others being men named Maciek and Siemionek and a woman named Baska) to accompany Catherine, but she evidently had a strongly favoured position.

When Catherine and John were imprisoned in Gripsholm Castle in Sweden in 1563, Catherine was not able to keep her entire household of Poles, Italians and Germans, but Dorothea Ostrelska, as well as another court dwarf, belonged to those she acquired permission from Eric XIV of Sweden to keep. During the four years long captivity, Dorothea is noted to be by Catherine's side when she walked the gardens, when she was given permission to leave the Castle and visit a spring, and when she gave birth in prison.

Dorothea upheld a correspondence with the sister of Catherine, Sophia Jagiellon, Duchess of Brunswick-Lüneburg, and has left some writings which provides a source of information of contemporary Sweden. Her correspondence describes the contemporary political situation in Sweden and provides insight into her own influential position as a favored confidant. One example is the information that Karin Månsdotter was engaged in market trade prior to her marriage. After Erik XIV:s marriage to Karin Månsdotter in 1567, she wrote to Sophia:

"The madness which has taken ahold of him is a consequence of his evil deeds. He was somewhat off his senses even before, but now he is completely so, influenced to it by his wife. Your Highness must have heard, that this Lord has sent word for many, to see if someone could please him. But he has found fault with everyone; one too pale, one too thin, a third too white, a fourth to black, no one was good enough. And finally he has chosen for himself someone from his own Realm, who previously engaged in market trade [...] He has not yet crowned her, as he does not know where he can find the crown, but he has her with him in his chambers..."

However, her words about Karin being involved in market trade may not have been literally meant, but rather a way of her to illustrate that Karin was a commoner.

Dorothea came into a position of some importance when Catherine became queen upon the succession of John III to the throne in 1568. She was a favorite and confidante of Catherine, and credited with a position of some political influence. She evidently acted as an informer to the queen. Her favored position is also revealed in the great care, privileges and concern the queen showed her while she (Ostrelska) was at one point taken ill. When the imprisoned Eric XIV almost managed to break through a window in his cell, it was Dorothea Ostrelska who revealed his escape attempt and caused him to have bars installed in his cell and his windows reduced in size.

Dorothea Ostrelska was in service of the queen until 1577, after which she is not documented anywhere and is reasonably assumed to have died.
