= Agnieszka (courtier) =

Agnieszka (died after 1572), was a Polish Court dwarf in service of Sophia Jagiellon, Duchess of Brunswick-Lüneburg. She was the personal favorite and secretary of Sophia.

Agnieszka was likely in the service of Sophia in Poland prior to her marriage. She did belong to the Polish retinue of 500 people accompanying Sophia from Poland to her new life in Germany upon her marriage to Henry V, Duke of Brunswick-Lüneburg in February 1556. In contrast to the majority of the Polish courtiers, Agnieszka remained with Sophia in her new court in Germany in Wolfenbüttel Castle. She had an influential position at court as the personal confidante and secretary of Sophia. She conducted the correspondence between Sophia and her powerful relatives, such as her brother the king of Poland and her sister the queen of Sweden. In 1568, she accompanied Sophia to her dower court, and assisted her in making it a cultural center. After 1572, she assisted Sophia in her work to defend her late brother's will. Her year of death is not known, but she was noted to be alive in 1572. Her position is mirrored with Dorothea Ostrelska, whose life in the court of Sophia's sister Catherine Jagellon is an almost exact replica to her.
