= Ovitz =

Ovitz is a surname. Notable people with the surname include:

- Michael Ovitz (born 1946), former president of Disney and Creative Artists Agency
- Judy Ovitz, actress, known for Back to the Future Part II
  - Kimberly Ovitz (born 1983), fashion designer and daughter of Michael Ovitz and Judy Ovitz
- Ovitz family, a family of 12 Hungarian Jewish dwarf musicians who survived Auschwitz
