= Court dwarf =

Person with dwarfism employed by a court

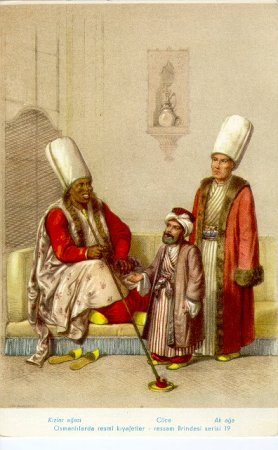
19th-century depiction of servants in the Ottoman Imperial Harem: the Chief Black Eunuch (left), a court dwarf (middle) and the Chief White Eunuch (right).

Over the course of history, some people with dwarfism were employed as court dwarfs. They were owned and traded amongst people of the court, and delivered as gifts to kings and queens. Filling a similar role to jesters, a court dwarf would entertain nobles and visitors with performances that mocked their physical features. Some court dwarfs, however, gained higher status positions and were favored by the royals who owned them.

== Visual effect ==
Court dwarfs were made to stand right next to the king or queen in a royal court during public appearances and ceremonies. Because they were so small, the king appeared much larger and visually enhanced his powerful position. Along with those court jesters who were professional entertainers and clowns, some court dwarfs were also classed among "naturals" (i.e., intellectually disabled), rousing amusement due both to their unusual bodies and behavior. Their appearance also invoked mythology and magical beings such as kobolds and elves.

== Antiquity ==
=== Ancient Egypt, Greece, and Rome ===
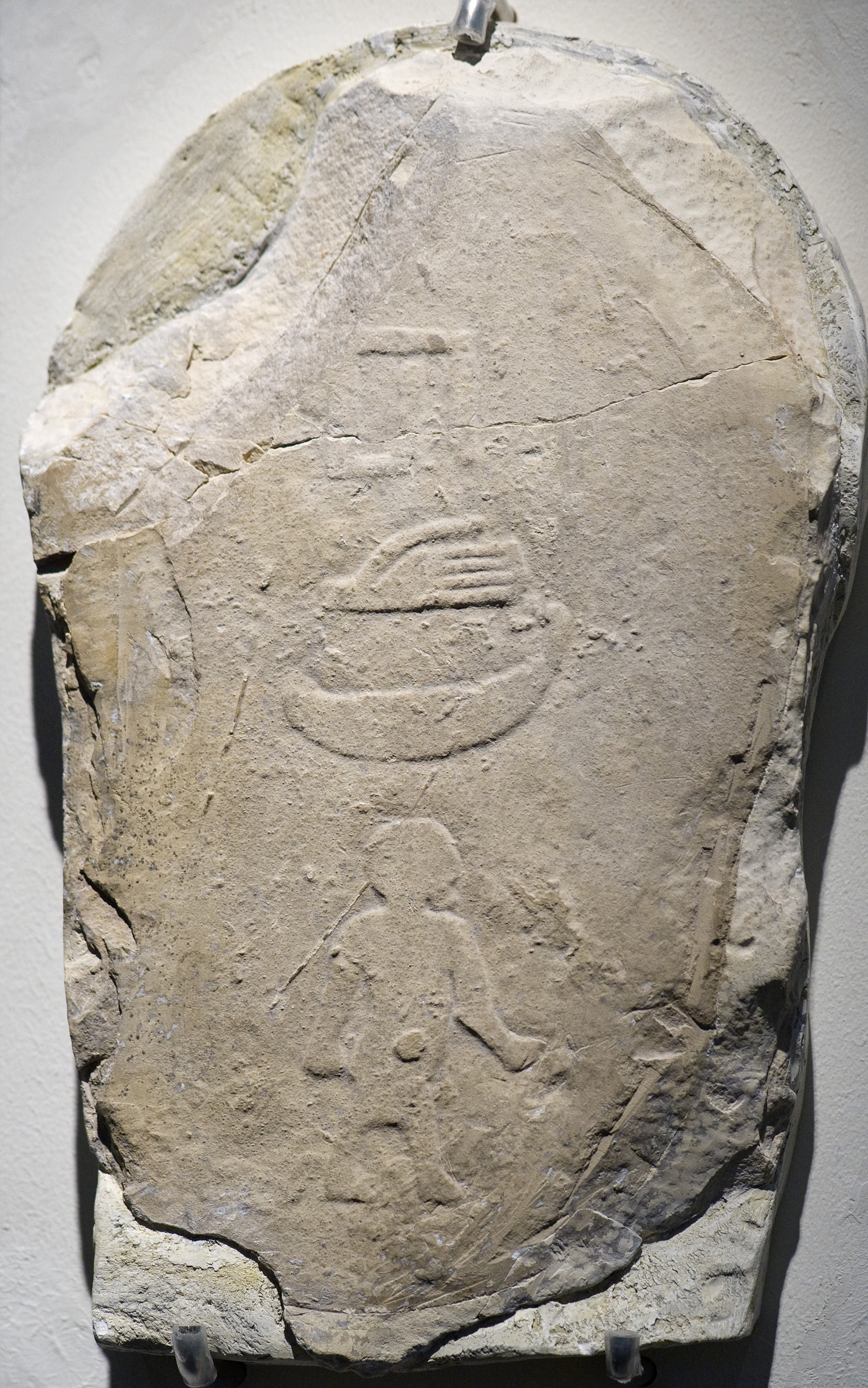
Stele hieroglyph depicting the court dwarf Hed, who died with his master, from the tomb of the Egyptian Pharaoh Den, 2850 BCE

From the earliest historic times, people with dwarfism attracted attention, and there was much competition on the part of kings and the wealthy to obtain dwarfs as attendants. Ancient Egypt saw dwarfs as being people with significant sacred associations, so owning a dwarf gave a person high social stature.

Julia, the niece of Augustus, had a dwarf named Conopas 2 feet 4 inches (0.71 m) high, and a freed-maid Andromeda who measured the same.

=== China ===
Sima Qian wrote of court dwarfs. He wrote about You Zan, a court dwarf under the "First Emperor of Qin" who reigned from 259 to 210 B.C.E. In one passage he described You taking pity on guards standing in the rain outside a banquet. It is said that the emperor overheard You's conversation with them and ordered a changing of the guards so that they could rest inside.

Martin Monestier claims that the Emperor Xuanzong constructed a "Resting Place for Desirable Monsters" where dwarfs were included among the "monsters." Emperor Wu Di, who reigned during the Western Han dynasty, imported numerous dwarfs to act as slaves and jesters. Yang Cheng, a provincial governor, intervened to help them. He told the emperor that little people were his subjects rather than slaves and should be treated as such. Wu Di was moved and released the dwarfs. Yang Cheng was deified and worshipped by some of their families. Yang Cheng's image was worshipped for centuries. The practice of keeping court dwarfs persisted as well.

Chinese emperors were able to import dwarfs via the Silk Road. This practice persisted at least until the Tang dynasty.

== Modern era in Europe ==
In early modern Europe, a court dwarf was a symbol of status, and the competing rulers tried to recruit as many people with dwarfism as possible to serve in their courts. Natalya Alexeyevna of Russia, a sister of Tsar Peter the Great, was recorded to have had 93 court dwarfs, while the Spanish royal court housed 70 dwarfs in the period from 1563 to 1700. People with dwarfism were often traded as gifts between rulers; Catherine de' Medici once received a gift of a court dwarf inside a birdcage, suggesting people with dwarfism were collected similarly to exotic animals. Several royals attempted breeding programs to create more court dwarfs.

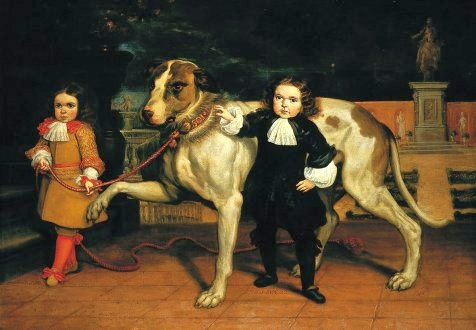
Spanish court dwarfs with a dog by Jan van Kessel the Younger, 1670s

In court, people with dwarfism were treated as sources of entertainment. Royals would construct comedic routines around the court dwarfs that mocked their physical size; in some performances, court dwarfs were taken out of a person's pocket, or served on a plate at a banquet. While jesters were often only temporarily present at a specific court, people with dwarfism usually had a permanent function and were registered in the personnel rolls as "court dwarf", "personal dwarf" or "chamber dwarf".

While many court dwarfs experienced limited lives, their important role in the court's culture could give them close access to the ruler. Due to their small size and their marginalization from wider society, people with dwarfism may not have been considered a threat to the monarchs, who allowed them into personal quarters. Thus some royals granted their court dwarfs higher status and roles beyond entertainment. Court dwarfs served as a substitutes for children, animal handlers, or even diplomats. At the end of their career, these privileged dwarfs would usually receive a pension and other benefits. A favourite dwarf of Peter the Great received a state funeral including miniature horses and a "small priest".

=== France ===
Richebourg (1756–1846), was only 23 inches (0.58 m) tall. He began life as a servant in the Orleans family. In later years he was their pensioner. He is said to have been put to strange use in the French Revolution, passing in and out of Paris as an infant in a nurse's arms, but with dispatches, dangerous to carry, in Richebourg's baby-wrappings. He died in Paris in 1846, at the age of 90.

=== Italy ===
During the 15th century, Italian princes began to collect court dwarfs as a symbol of their legitimacy, and people with dwarfism became more common in court life and portraiture. Italian courts seem to have treated the role of the court dwarf as particularly comedic. In 1544, the court of Duke Cosimo I held a wrestling match between a court dwarf and a monkey, where the court dwarf was given no clothes except knickers to cover his genitalia. Such performances of humiliation were widely accepted and enjoyed.

Marchioness Isabella d'Este kept several court dwarves. Her favorite, "Matello", was known for performing crude and heretical routines to entertain the courtiers, and another of her court dwarves, called "Crazy Catherine", would lift her skirts and urinate upon request. Historian George Marek writes that Isabella's court dwarves were "skilled freaks, turning somersaults, dancing, and singing in falsetto voices." Isabella was fond of her court dwarves, creating properly-sized rooms for them and tending to Matello on his deathbed, but she may have only seen them as beloved pets.

=== Great Britain ===
British tradition has its earliest dwarf mentioned in the old ballad which begins "In Arthur's court Tom Thumb did live"; and on this evidence the prototype of the modern Tom Thumb is alleged to have lived at the court of King Edgar. Of historically documented English dwarfs, the first appears to be John Jarvis 2 feet (0.61 m), who was a page to Queen Mary I. Her brother King Edward VI had his dwarf called Xit.

A dwarf at the court of James VI and I, Christian Steward, was given £20 in 1616 for her journey to Scotland. The first English dwarf of whom there is any substantial history is Jeffrey Hudson (1619–1682). He was the son of a butcher at Oakham, Rutland, who kept and baited bulls for George Villiers, 1st Duke of Buckingham. Neither of Jeffrey's parents was undersized, yet at nine years he measured scarcely 18 inches (0.46 m) though he was gracefully proportioned. At a dinner given by the Duke to Charles I and his queen he was brought in to table in a pie out of which he stepped, and was at once adopted by Queen Henrietta Maria. Jeffrey followed the fortunes of the court in the English Civil War, and is said to have been a captain of horse, earning the nickname of "strenuous Jeffrey" for his activity.

He fought two duels—one with a turkey-cock, a battle recorded by Davenant, and a second with Mr Crofts, who came to the meeting with a squirt gun, but who in the more serious encounter which ensued was shot dead by Hudson, who fired from horseback, the saddle putting him on a level with his antagonist. Twice was Jeffrey made prisoner—once by the Dunkirkers as he was returning from France, whither he had been on homely business for the Queen; the second time was when he fell into the hands of Turkish pirates. His sufferings during this latter captivity made him, he declared, grow, and in his thirtieth year, having been of the same height since he was nine, he steadily increased until he was 3 feet 9 inches (1.14 m). At the Restoration, he returned to England, where he lived on a pension granted him by the Duke of Buckingham. He was later accused of participation in the Popish Plot and was imprisoned in the Gate House. He was released and shortly after died at the age of 63.

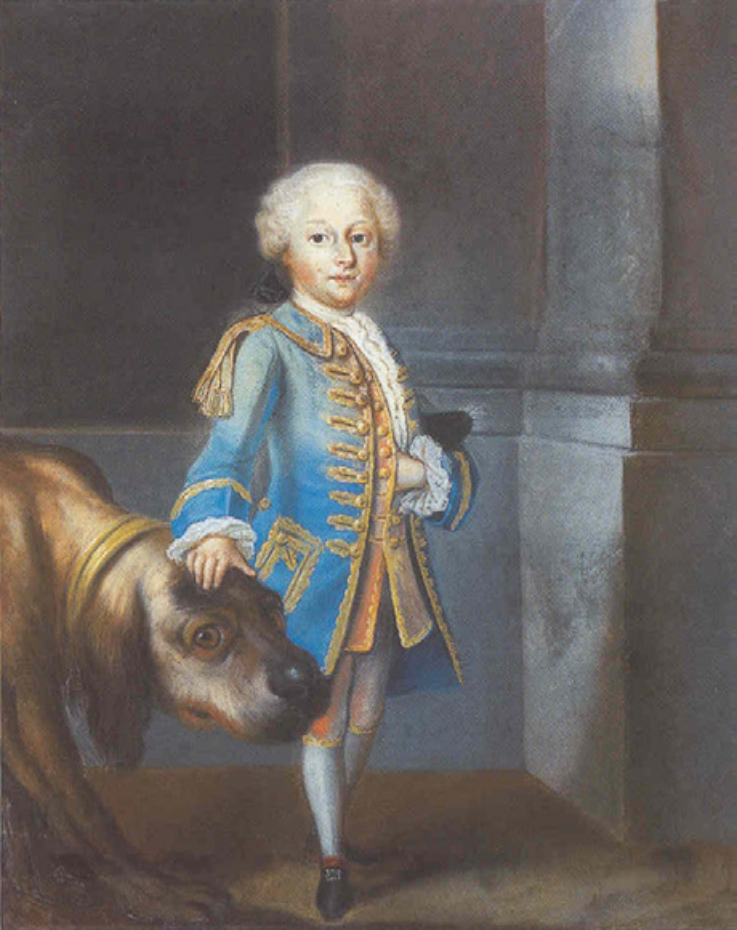
Portrait of Nicolas Ferry, the court dwarf of King Stanisław Leszczyński

Contemporary with Hudson were the two other dwarfs of Henrietta Maria, Richard Gibson and his wife Anne. They were married by the Queen's wish; and the two together measured only 7 feet 2 inches (2.18 m) They had nine children, five of whom, who lived, were of ordinary stature. Their eldest daughter was miniature painter Susan Penelope Rosse. Edmund Waller celebrated the nuptials, Evelyn designated the husband as the "compendium of a man", and Lely painted them hand in hand. Gibson was miniature painter to Charles I, and drawing-master to the daughters of James II, Queens Mary II and Anne, when they were children. Gibson was from Cumberland and began his career as a page, first in a "gentle", next in the royal family, died in 1690, in his seventy-fifth year, and is buried in St Paul's, Covent Garden. The last court dwarf in England was Coppernin, who was in the service of the princess (Augusta) of Wales, the mother of George III. The last dwarf retainer in a gentleman's family was the one kept by Mr Beckford, the author of Vathek and builder of Fonthill Abbey. He was rather too big to be flung from one guest to another, as used to be the custom at dinners in earlier days when a dwarf was a "necessity" for every noble family.

=== Poland ===
Court dwarfs existed in Poland from at least the 16th century, when the Polish princesses Catherine Jagiellon and Sophia Jagiellon both had court dwarf of their own Agnieszka (courtier) and Dorothea Ostrelska, who accompanied them to Sweden and Germany respectively when they left Poland to marry.

Court dwarfs were still in existence at the Polish court during the 18th century, when they had become unfashionable in other courts. King Stanisław Leszczyński owned Nicolas Ferry ("Bébé") (1741–1764), who measured 2 feet 9 inches (0.84 m). He was one of three dwarf children of peasant parents in the Vosges. He died in 1764, at the age of 24.

=== Spain ===
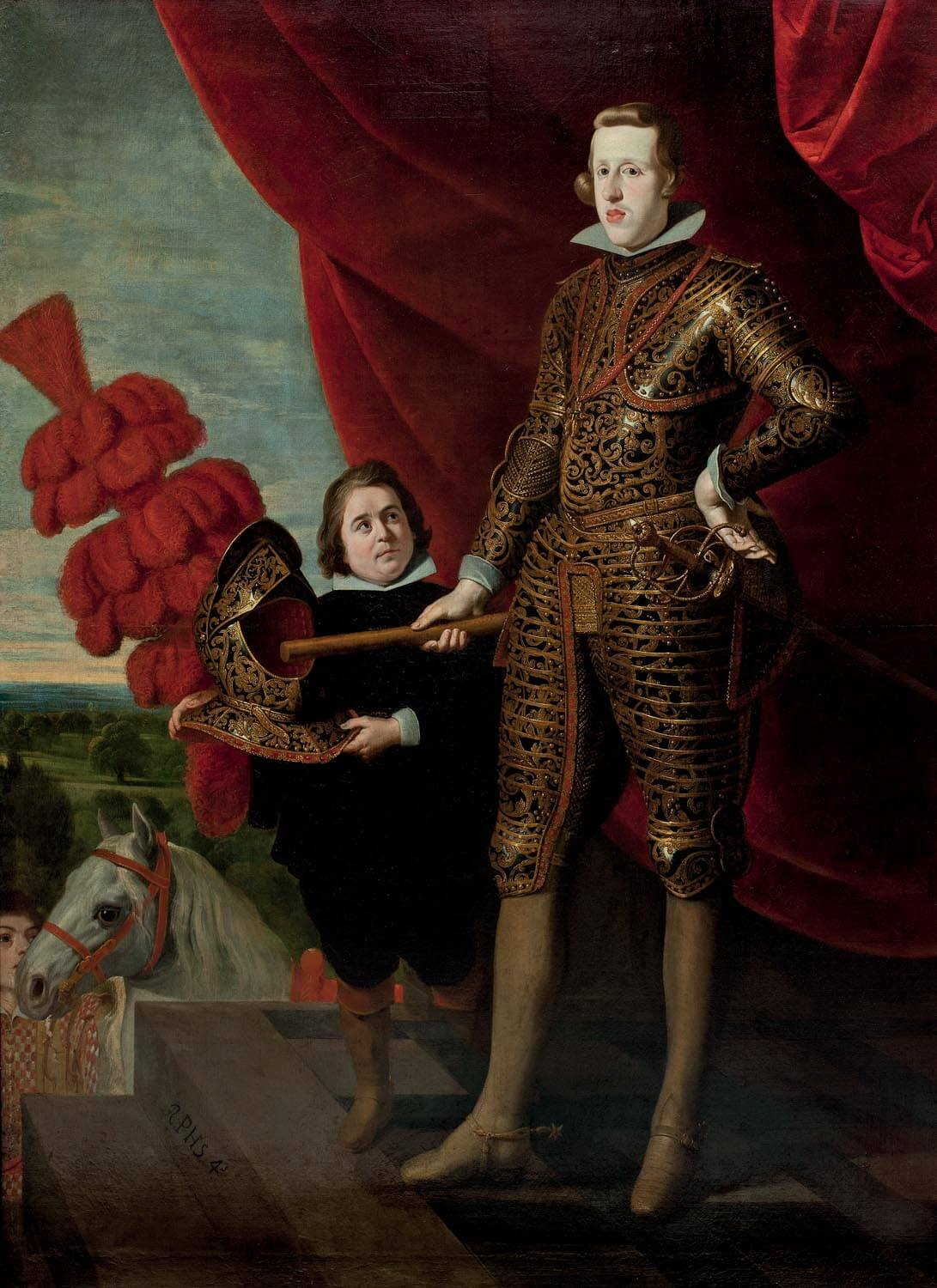
Portrait of Philip IV of Spain with his court dwarf by Gaspar de Crayer

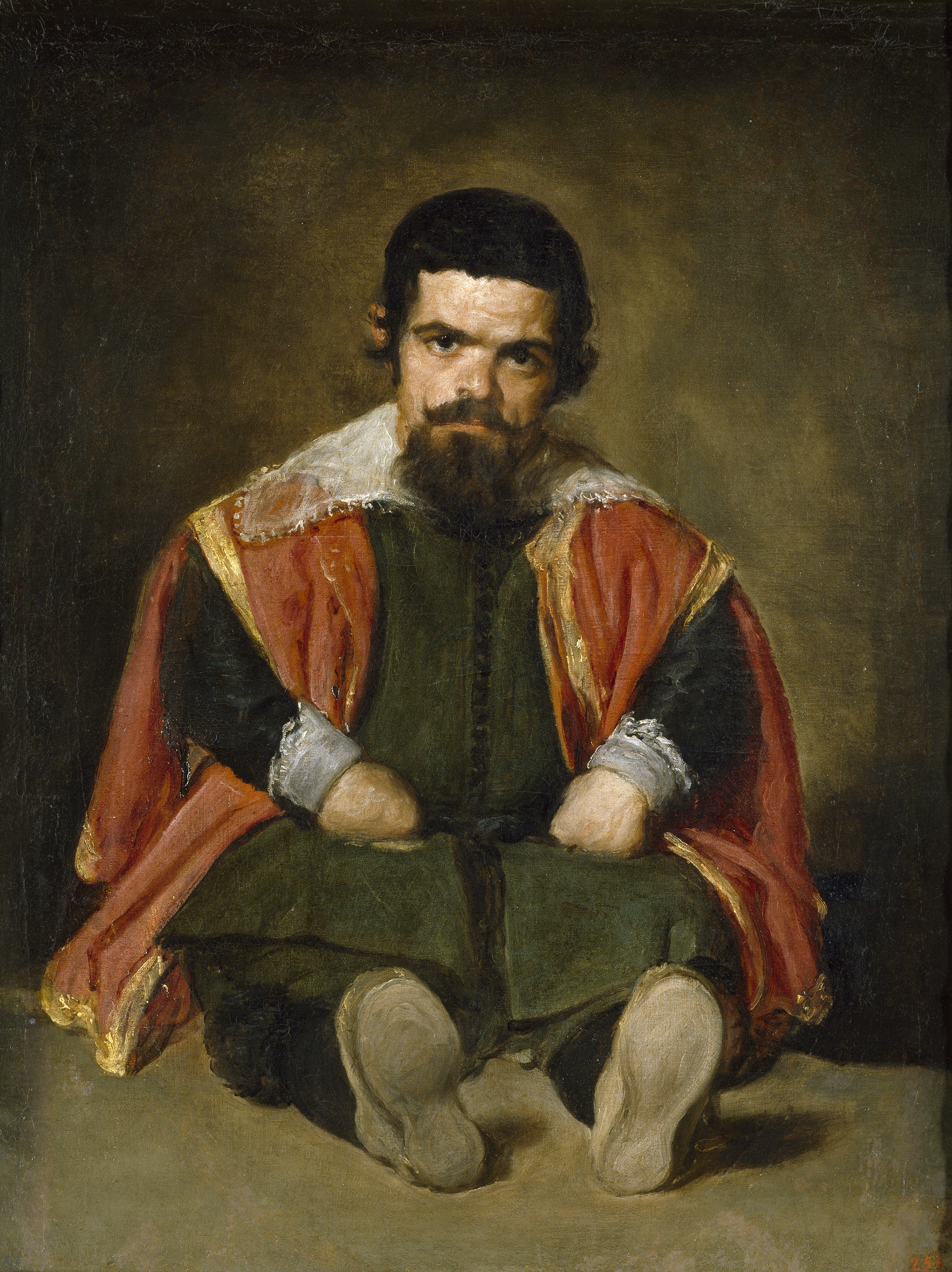
Portrait of Sebastián de Morra by Diego Velázquez c. 1645

The Spanish Royal Court was famed for its court dwarfs during the 16th and 17th centuries. Court dwarfs often performed during mealtimes because laughter was believed to improve digestion.

Of European court dwarfs, the most famous were those of Philip IV of Spain, who were often painted by the court painter Diego Velázquez. One of them was Maria Bárbola, who was employed as Enana de la Reina, the official dwarf of the queen, between 1651 and 1700. Queen's Household employed several other court dwafs, among them Juana de Aunon, the sisters Genoveva and Catalina Bazan, and Bernarda Blasco. They had a privileged position with their own servants, and acted as playmates of the royal children.

The era of the court dwarfs in Spain ended in the year of 1700, when the new king Philip V of Spain modernized the Spanish Royal Court by abolishing several posts he deemed outdated and was by then unfashionable in other parts of Europe, such as jesters, fools and court dwarfs.

=== Sweden ===
Court dwarfs are noted at the Swedish Royal Court from the mid 16th-century, when the female court dwarfs "Lilla Gunnel" ('Little Gunnel') and Fedossa from Russia were in service of Princess Sophia of Sweden.

The Polish princess Catherine Jagiellon (1526–1583), married to the Swedish John III, duke of Finland and later king of Sweden, had a close confidante in Dorothea Ostrelska, a dwarf woman. Dosieczka, as she was known, was one of the only members of Catherine's entourage that she kept with her while imprisoned by king Erik XIV of Sweden as a result of her husband, the king's brother, rebelling against the crown. Dosieczka was a favorite and confidante of Catherine also after the latter became queen of Sweden.

Court dwarfs were a part of the Swedish Royal Court during the entire 17th-century, often as jesters, and several are noted, such as "Narrinnan Elisabet" ('Elisabet the Female Jester'), employed with queen Maria Eleonora, Annika Kollberg (or 'Little Midget Annika') employed with queen Hedvig Eleonora, and Anders Luxemburg with Charles XII of Sweden.

The court dwarfs were normally not given wages but only clothing, food and room: however, in individual cases some of them, such as the African court dwarf Carl Ulrich, could be given schooling and training in a proper occupation and formally employed as chamber servants or stable boys and thus given proper wages, and at least one, Anders Been, was ennobled. The position of court dwarf became unfashionable after the reign of Charles XII.

== List of people with the position of court dwarf ==
- Nano Morgante, Italian court dwarf in the court of Grand Duke Cosimo I de' Medici of Tuscany]]
- Agnieszka, Polish court dwarf in service of Sophia Jagiellon, Duchess of Brunswick-Lüneburg
- Maria Bárbola, Spanish court dwarf
- Anders Been, Norwegian painter and court dwarf in service of the Swedish queen dowager Hedwig Eleonora of Holstein-Gottorp
- François de Cuvilliés, originally court dwarf of Maximilian II Emanuel, Elector of Bavaria
- Nicolas Ferry (known as Bébé) (1741–1764), French dwarf of Polish King Stanisław Leszczyński
- Helena Antonia, court dwarf of Maria of Austria, Holy Roman Empress
- Jeffrey Hudson (1619 – c. 1682) court dwarf of the English queen Henrietta Maria of France
- Józef Boruwłaski (1739–1837), Polish-born court dwarf and musician who toured in European and Turkish courts
- Perkeo of Heidelberg, court dwarf of Elector Palatine Charles III Philip in Heidelberg

== Gallery ==
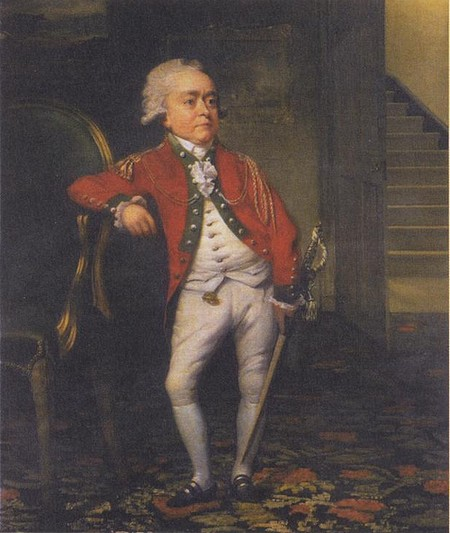
Portrait of Józef Boruwłaski (1739–1837), court dwarf

Detail of Las Meninas by Diego Velázquez showing two court dwarfs, among them Maria Bárbola

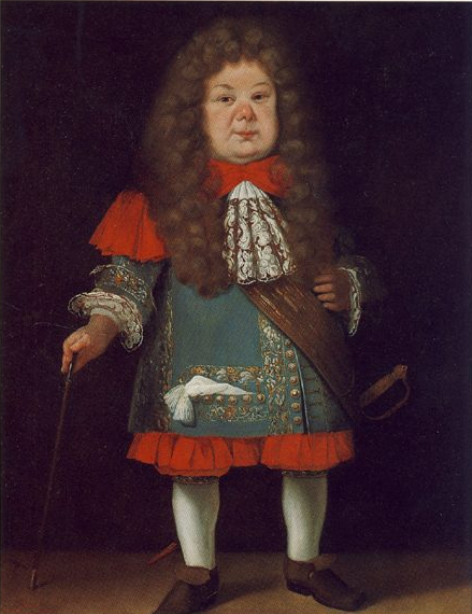
Portrait of Johann Franz von Meichelböck, court dwarf of the Prince Archbishop of Salzburg, by Frans van Stampart, c. 1730

== See also ==
- Kammermohr
