= Anders Been =

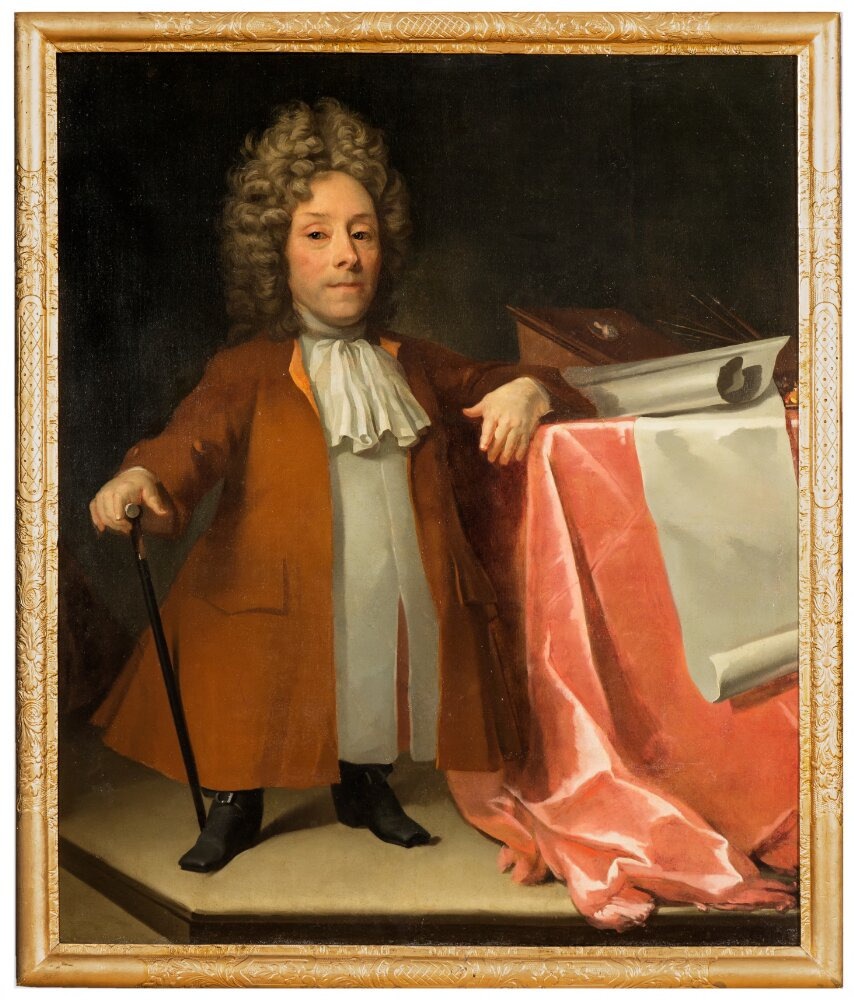
- Portrait by David von Krafft
- Born: 1650
- Died: 1730
- Occupation(s): Painter, Court Dwarf

Anders Been later Andreas von Behn (1650–1730), was a Norwegian painter and court dwarf in service of the Swedish queen dowager Hedwig Eleonora of Holstein-Gottorp.

Born in Norway, Been found himself in the service of the Swedish Queen Dowager, who had a number of court dwarfs in her household. In Sweden, he was often referred to as "The Dwarf from Norway". While his specific responsibilities were described as being "somewhere between that of a valet and a barber," he also pursued an active career as a painter.

Been gained recognition for his artistic talent and was known to have adorned some of the cabinets at Drottningholm Palace with his artwork. Eventually, Queen Dowager had him ennobled. In 1709, Been left Sweden furnished with travel funds from the Queen.
