= Jacques Cordier =

Jacques Cordier (c. 1580 – 1653), known as "Bocan", was a French player of the violin and rebec, dancing master and composer, in the reign of Louis XIII.

== Career ==
He was born in Lorraine about 1580. He was unable to read music, but had great power of execution, and Marin Mersenne mentions his gift of modulating the tones of the violin. He was dancing master to Anne of Denmark, wife of James VI and I, and known as "Buckan" or "Boucan". Later, he was dancing master to Henrietta Maria, Queen of Charles I of England. The King took great delight in hearing him play the violin.

In 1630, Jacques Cordier and Jeffrey Hudson were included in a mission to France. On the return journey across the English Channel, their ship was captured by Dunkirk pirates, who plundered the ship. Cordier and Hudson, and the royal midwife Madame Peronne, were taken prisoner. They were eventually released and returned to England.

Cordier returned to Paris when the Civil War broke out. His tomb at Saint-Germain l'Auxerrois was restored in 1843.

François de Chancy's Tablature de Mandore (Paris, 1629), contains a graceful branle by Cordier.
