= Catherine Jagiellon =

Queen of Sweden from 1568 to 1583

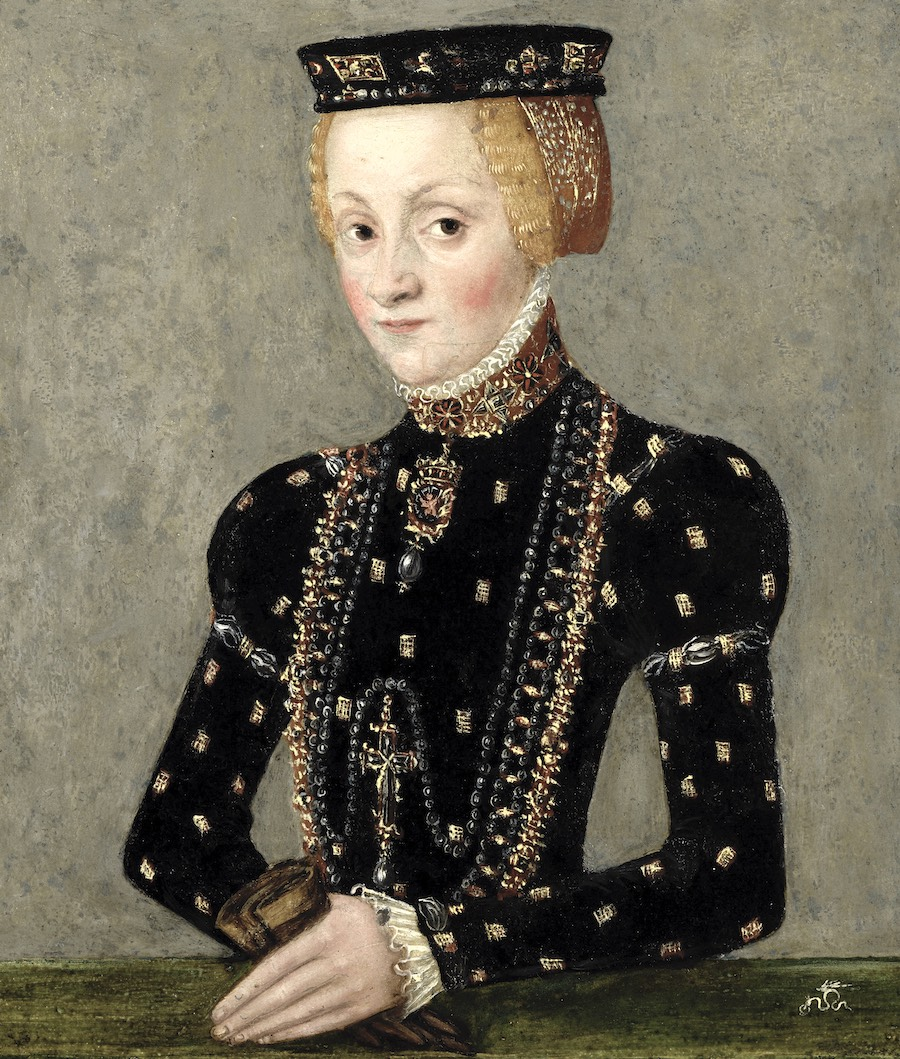
- Portrait by Lucas Cranach the Younger (c. 1556)

Queen consort of Sweden
- Tenure: 30 September 1568 – 16 September 1583
- Born: 1 November 1526; Kraków, Poland
- Died: 16 September 1583 (aged 56); Stockholm, Sweden
- Burial: Uppsala Cathedral, Sweden
- Spouse: John III of Sweden (m. 1562)
- Issue: Isabella Vasa; Sigismund III Vasa; Anna Vasa of Sweden
- Dynasty: Jagiellon
- Father: Sigismund I of Poland
- Mother: Bona Sforza
- Religion: Roman Catholicism

Catherine Jagiellon (Polish: Katarzyna Jagiellonka; Swedish: Katarina Jagellonica, Lithuanian: Kotryna Jogailaitė; 1 November 1526 – 16 September 1583) was a princess of the Polish–Lithuanian Commonwealth and Queen of Sweden from 1569 as the wife of King John III. Catherine had significant influence over state affairs during the reign of her spouse. She negotiated with the pope to introduce Counter-Reformation in Sweden. She was the mother of Sigismund III Vasa.

== Early life ==
Catherine Jagiellon was born in Kraków as the youngest daughter of King Sigismund I the Old of the Polish–Lithuanian Commonwealth and his wife, Bona Sforza of Milan.

Catherine was given a thorough Renaissance education by Italian tutors: she was taught to read, write and speak Latin, German and Italian, instructed in conversation, riding, dancing, singing, and playing several musical instruments.

After the death of her father in 1548, she and her unmarried sisters Anna and Sophia moved to Masovia with their mother. In 1556, when her sister Sophia married and left for Germany and her mother departed for Italy, Catherine and her sister Anna were moved to the Palace of Vilnius by their brother Sigismund II Augustus of Poland, to ensure a royal presence in Lithuania. Their stay in Vilnius was described as happy, living in a palace and a court strongly influenced by the Italian Renaissance: Catherine and Anna were allowed to compose their own separate households and socialized with the aristocracy.

=== Marriage negotiations ===
Catherine was described as the most beautiful of her sisters, but she was married late for a princess of the era because her family wanted to ensure a marriage of the highest political status for Poland, and the marriages proposed to her demanded protracted negotiations which ultimately came to nothing. In 1548, she was proposed marriage to by both Albert Alcibiades, Margrave of Brandenburg-Kulmbach and Duke Albert of Prussia, who both preferred her to her sisters Anna and Sophia. Her brother was inclined to the latter, but after lengthy negotiations, the Pope refused the marriage because they were related to each other. Next, she was proposed to by Archduke Ferdinand II of Austria, but her brother, who had himself married a member of the Habsburg dynasty by then, ultimately decided against it.

In the 1550s, her brother the king wished for an alliance between Poland and Sweden against the Tsardom of Russia due to growing tension around Livonia. The religious issue was not considered a serious obstacle by her brother, and the Catholic policy in Poland was at that time still tolerant toward Protestantism. The Polish-Swedish alliance was a wish her brother entertained for several years, and it had in fact been suggested already in 1526, that time between her half-sister Hedwig and King Gustav I of Sweden. In 1555–56, Sigismund II Augustus suggested to King Gustav I that one of the four Swedish princes, preferably Eric or his brother John, should marry either his sister Anna or Catherine, and he sent portraits of the princesses to the Swedish royal court. Eric was at that time proposing to marry the future queen Elizabeth I of England, however, a proposal he was not willing to give up for several years. There was talk of Catherine marrying John, but Sigismund II Augustus was somewhat reluctant to allow his younger sister to marry before the eldest, Anna, and this created a problem. The negotiations were drawn out, and in 1560, Gustav I died and all negotiations were closed.

In August 1560, during the Livonian war, Czar Ivan the Terrible, recently widowed, suggested a marriage between himself and Catherine in order to create peace and settle the differences between Poland and Russia. Her brother viewed the proposal favourably and a Russian delegation visited the Polish court in Vilnius. The Russian envoy reported to Ivan the Terrible that Catherine was beautiful, but that she was crying. Ultimately, Poland and Russia could not agree on the political terms of the marriage and the negotiations were discontinued in January 1561.

In July 1561, Sigismund II Augustus suggested to King Eric XIV that his sisters Catherine and Anna should be married to the king's brothers, John and Magnus. Erik XIV gave no definite answer. John was willing to marry Catherine, but not Anna. Sigismund II Augustus was still somewhat reluctant to allow his younger sister to marry before his older one, which created a problem. Magnus eventually expressed himself willing to marry Anna to enable John to marry Catherine, but the negotiations initially led to nothing and the Swedish king was not willing to take a stand on the issue. In October, John resumed the negotiations of marriage between himself and Catherine on his own initiative and without the consent of Eric XIV, during a time when Sweden under Eric XIV was fighting Poland in the Livonian war. John viewed the Polish king as an important ally and Catherine's Italian inheritance from her mother as important assets in his personal ambitions.

== Duchess of Finland ==
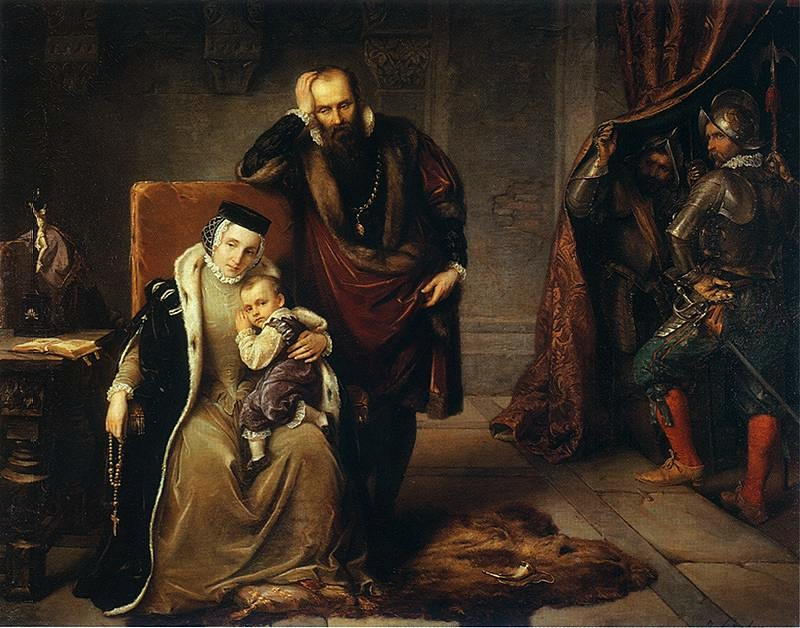
Catherine the Jagiellonian in prison, by Józef Simmler.

On 4 October 1562, Catherine was married in the Lower Castle of Vilnius, Lithuania, to Duke John of Finland, the second son of Gustav I and half-brother of the then-reigning King Eric XIV. John had not received his brother's permission for the marriage and there were already tensions between them since John pursued an independent foreign policy. The marriage was conducted in a Catholic ceremony. Catherine brought a large entourage and luxurious possessions, but the inheritance from her mother was actually never given to her. The material dowry she brought with her to Finland, however, greatly impressed her contemporaries: she brought with her an impressive amount of silver items, among them the first forks used in Finland; hundreds of garments in black, yellow, red and purple satin, silk and velvet; as well as an entourage of Poles, Italians and Germans, among them a Polish cook and an Italian vine master.

The couple set up house in Turku Castle in Turku, Finland. Duke John's dealings in Livonia caused King Eric XIV to declare war on his brother. Eric sent 10,000 men to besiege the castle. On 12 August 1563, the castle capitulated; Catherine and John were taken to Sweden and imprisoned in Gripsholm Castle.

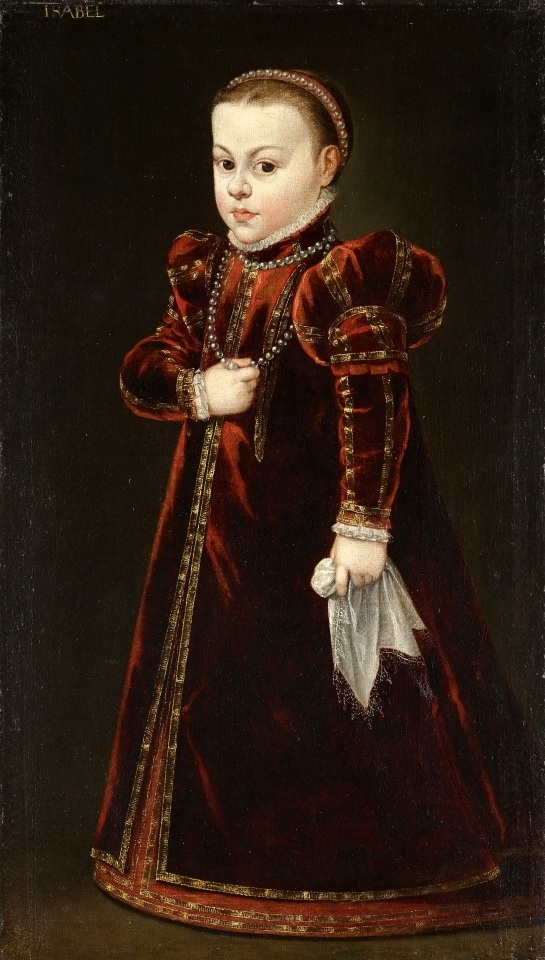
Portrait of Catherine and John's daughter Isabella Vasa (1564–1566), attributed to Domenicus Verwilt. The portrait is today at Wawel Castle. It is thought to have been a gift to Catherine's sister Anna Jagiellon.

Eric offered to allow Catherine to return to Poland, but she chose to accompany John in prison. Tradition claims that when the king made the offer, Catherine pointed to the inscription in her wedding ring, which said: Nemo nisi mors ("Nothing but death [shall separate us]"). Catherine was used as a valuable hostage by Eric, but because of her, the imprisonment was lenient. She was personally treated with consideration by king Eric, who allowed her greater freedom than John, such as walking in the area around the castle, and generally granted all requests she made in order to make her imprisonment more comfortable, with the exception of anything that had to do with her Catholic religion, such as the access to Catholic priests, which he denied. She asked for the larger part of her entourage to be sent home, only keeping some Polish ladies-in-waiting and her Court dwarf and personal confidante Dorothea Ostrelska. During her incarceration, Catherine gave birth first to her eldest daughter Isabella in 1564 (died 1566), then to her son Sigismund in 1566. In October 1567, John reconciled with Eric, and the couple was released. Catherine and John apparently developed a close relationship during the years of imprisonment.

Catherine's unsuccessful suitor Tsar Ivan was in negotiations with Eric in hopes of separating her from John and sending her to marry him in Russia. This caused alarm among Catherine and her relations. In popular opinion, this discussion was one of the reasons for the Swedish people's growing dissatisfaction with the increasingly insane Eric. King Eric agreed to hand over Catherine to Ivan, but the Swedish king was deposed before Catherine could be sent away. As his brother John succeeded him, the problem disappeared. Catherine was at Vadstena during the rebellion.

Another reason which agitated the nobility against Erik XIV and made them encourage the rebellion of Duke John and his brother Duke Charles was the marriage of Erik to the commoner Karin Månsdotter, which the nobility regarded as an insult. Catherine played some part in the rebellion: she was a friend of one of Erik's enemies, Ebba Lilliehöök, who had an influential position within the nobility, and she was also directly approached by Pontus De la Gardie, who appealed to her to persuade the indecisive John to join the rebellion against the King in protest of his scandalous marriage. According to a witness, she answered:

"Pontus! I have heard your advice and the reasons you present well and good, and they are all very correct and just, but hard to realize. My dear friend, show me the courtesy of allowing this to remain between us, and I will speak to my lord and husband."

After the fall of Stockholm, she made her entrance to the city in a grand procession on 7 November 1568.

== Queen consort ==
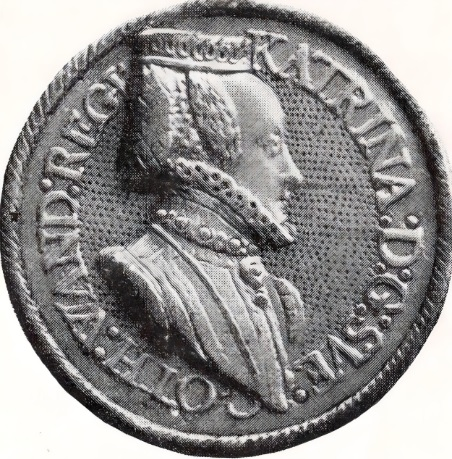
Medal for Queen Catherine about 1575

Catherine was crowned queen of Sweden in the spring of 1569. Her relationship with John III continued to be very good during her lifetime, and there are no extramarital partners known on either side. Her ladies-in-waiting were supervised by Karin Gyllenstierna and her household by chamberlain Pontus De la Gardie, with whom she reportedly had a very good personal relationship (she gave him power of attorney to act as her agent and envoy in Italy regarding her Sforza inheritance). She had her own personal Catholic chapel at court as well as several Catholics in her private household, among them several Catholic monks and priests, which shocked the Protestants. Despite the controversy around her regarding her role in religious policy, she does not appear to have been subjected to much personal slander. She received many supplicants from both Catholics and Protestants, asking her for charity as well as to act as mediary to the king, and fulfilled these duties as was expected by a contemporary queen consort. Her fervent Protestant brother-in-law, the future Charles IX mentioned her in his propaganda chronicle Hertig Karls rimkrönika, in which he slanders the names of her spouse, son and daughter, but with only mild disapproval toward Catherine, acknowledging her personal qualities: "She was a Princess full of virtue and piety, still her faith did come from Rome".

Queen Catherine had political influence and influenced the monarch in many areas, such as his foreign policy and his interest in Renaissance art. It is a revealing fact that the king's diplomatic contacts with the Catholic powers quickly diminished after her death. Foremost, however, she is known to have influenced John III in his religious policy in favour of Catholicism and the Counter-Reformation, just as the next queen and spouse of John III, Gunilla Bielke, would influence his religious policy in favour of Protestantism. John III named Catherine the prospective regent of Sweden during the minority of his son, should he die while his son was a minor.

Another significant matter of interest were the rights of her son Sigismund to the Polish throne. She brought up both her children in the Catholic faith, which made Sigismund acceptable as a Polish monarch. After the death of her childless brother Sigismund II Augustus in 1572, she considered her son to have rights to the Polish throne through her. However, after 1569, Poland had become an elective monarchy. This matter, however, also made her significant internationally.

In 1582, she received the former queen, Karin Månsdotter, and saw to it that her confiscated jewellery was returned to her.

=== Religious policy ===
After having become queen, she attracted international attention as a Catholic queen in a Protestant nation, with the position of being able to introduce the Counter-Reformation. In the Papal curia in Rome, she was seen as a Catholic in heretic surroundings.

The same year she became queen, her Polish adviser coadjutor Martin Kromer encouraged her to convert John III to Catholicism. She answered that she was willing, but that the monarch and the public would not accept it. Cardinal Commendone asked her sister, the Queen of Poland Anna Jagiellon, to support her in her religious-political task, and through Anna, she made contact with the Papal Curia in Rome. A conflict arose between Catherine and Pope Pius V after it became known that she had received the communion "sub utraque", something which had been banned in the Council of Trent and since then regarded as a sign of heresy. In 1572, she asked for two papal advisers and was given the Polish Jesuit Johan Herbst as her confessor. From 1572, Queen Catherine was in direct contact with Cardinal Stanislaus Hosius, who declared that he would serve as her support and ally in the work of counter-reformation in Sweden and her messenger to the Pope.

In the autumn of 1572, Catherine applied for dispensation to be given the right to receive the communion "sub utraque" and certain dispensations regarding fasting. Her demands are seen as a way for John III to investigate how far the Catholic church would be willing to go to introduce the Counter-Reformation, as certain changes would have to be made to make it possible. John III launched a new church order called "Röda Boken" ("The Red Book"). This was a sort of mix between Protestantism and Catholicism that reintroduced numerous Catholic customs in the ceremonial life of the Swedish church, one of them being the use of Latin, which aroused a great deal of opposition and resulted in the Liturgical struggle, which was not to end for twenty years. Queen Catherine, Queen Anna, Cardinal Hosius and the pope negotiated for several years about this, and Catherine pointed out, that without certain dispensations for Sweden, a counter-reformation would not be possible. In 1574, she was given absolution and dispensation regarding fasting, but as the pope refused dispensation regarding communion, she refused to take communion altogether. Her agent in Rome was Paolo Ferrari. The papal curia had serious hopes for a counter-reformation in Sweden through her. In 1574, she received the Polish Jesuit Stanislaus Warszewicki, sent to her as an ambassador from the pope and king Philip II of Spain.

Queen Catherine had the son of the deposed Eric XIV sent to the Jesuit order in Poland in 1573. In 1575, the ban for the remaining convents in Sweden to accept novices was lifted. In 1576, she sent her son to be educated by the Jesuits in Braunsberg. She welcomed the Norwegian Jesuit Laurentius Nicolai from Rome and housed him in the former Franciscan monastery in Stockholm, which had been closed during the Reformation, and allowed him to open a Catholic school there (the Protestants stormed and closed the school in 1583). Queen Catherine strongly supported the old Vadstena Abbey, where the last nuns still lived, and often visited it. A new shrine was made for the relics of King Eric the Saint in the cathedral of Uppsala.

The counter-reformatory efforts contributed to tension in connection to the imprisoned Erik XIV, who came to be a symbol of Protestantism in prison. During the imprisonment of Eric, three major conspiracies were made to depose John III: the 1569 Plot, the Mornay Plot and the 1576 Plot, among which at least the last was heavily influenced by religious considerations.

=== Sforza inheritance ===
Catherine and John III were both eager to be given possession of her part of the Sforza inheritance from her mother in Italy. Queen Catherine had her own personal ambassadors in Rome to protect her interests, Petrus Rosinus and Ture Bielke. The papal curia was willing to help them in this issue, but as her inheritance was situated in the Kingdom of Naples, then belonging to Spain, the pope did not succeed. During the reign of King Stephen Báthory in Poland, the relation between Sweden and Poland affected Catherine's power position in Sweden and placed her in a difficult situation. In 1578-79 and 1579–80, she received the papal ambassador Antonio Possevino. He had been given the task of providing Catherine with her Sforza inheritance, mediating between Poland and Sweden and converting John III. He failed on all accounts. He did, however, confirm the marriage between the royal couple, which had been dubious in Rome, as it had lacked the dispensation which was necessary for Rome to consider a marriage between a Catholic and a Protestant as valid. In 1582, Catherine received the Polish ambassador Alamanni and explained that she was not in a position to convince John to make peace with Poland. At her next audience with the ambassador, she received him in the presence of her children Sigismund and Anna and stated that Poland seldom had seen to her interests.

Catherine was, by testament, one of the heirs of her nephew John Sigismund Zápolya, ruler of Transilvania.

=== Death ===
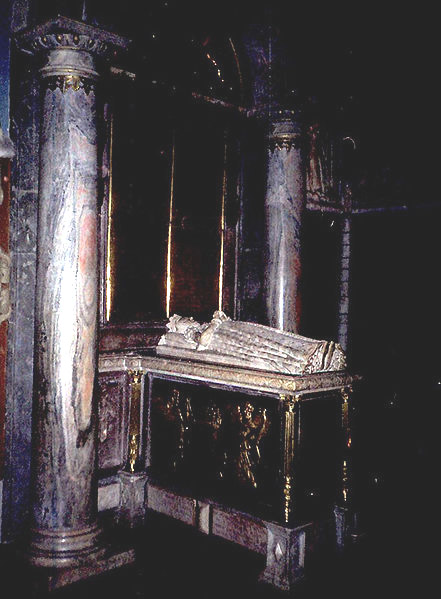
Catherine's grave monument over John's family crypt in Uppsala Cathedral

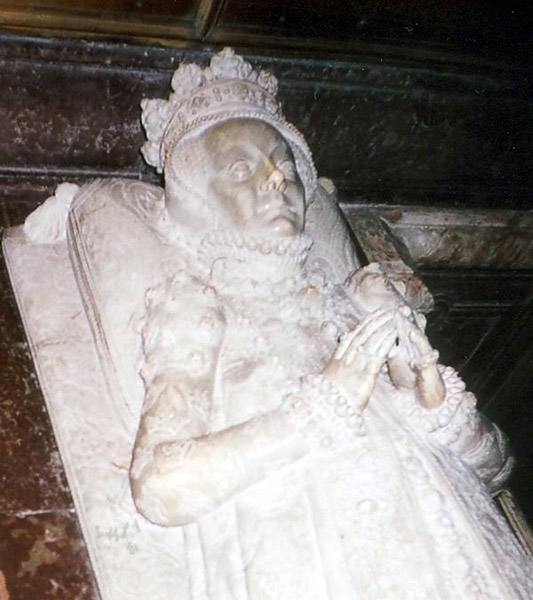
Catherine's tomb

In her final years, Catherine suffered from gout. She fell sick in the spring of 1583, died in Stockholm on 16 September 1583 and was buried in the royal crypt of the Uppsala Cathedral. Willem Boy was commissioned to create a tomb monument for the deceased queen, which can still be seen in the cathedral today.

== Legacy ==
The infusion of Polish - Lithuanian Commonwealth blood into the Swedish royal lineage that began with Catherine would cause considerable strife after her death in the context of the ongoing European wars of religion. Her son Sigismund inherited the thrones of both the Polish–Lithuanian Commonwealth (in 1587) and Sweden (in 1592) but ruled the latter only seven years before being deposed in 1599. Sigismund and his descendants, as Catholic kings, would continue to lay claim to de facto Protestant Sweden over the following century. The succession dispute contributed to the outbreak of several destructive wars until a massive Swedish invasion in the 1650s (known as the Deluge) nearly broke up the Polish–Lithuanian Commonwealth. Polish claims to the Swedish throne were finally relinquished in the 1660 Treaty of Oliva.

The image of Catherine Jagiellon enjoyed a resurgence in the 19th and 20th centuries Finnish culture and art. John and Catherine were the only Swedish monarchs to reside in the Finnish part of the Swedish realm for any length of time, and their alleged fondness for the land inspired Finnish nationalists. The religious issues that made Catherine unpopular with her contemporaries were by then long obsolete, and it has instead become traditional to depict her as a compassionate and loyal queen.

The first version of the later famous royal Drottningholm Palaca (The Queen's Islet) was founded for and named after her.

== See also ==
- List of Swedish monarchs
- History of Poland (1385–1569)

== Notes ==
Catherine Jagellon Born: 1 November 1526 Died: 16 September 1583
Swedish royalty
Preceded by Karin Månsdotter	Queen consort of Sweden; 1568–1583	Vacant Title next held by Gunilla Bielke
