= Man to Man (2005 film) =

- Film poster
- Directed by: Régis Wargnier
- Written by: William Boyd; Régis Wargnier
- Produced by: Aïssa Djabri; Farid Lahouassa
- Starring: Joseph Fiennes; Kristin Scott Thomas; Lomama Boseki; Cécile Bayiha; Iain Glen; Hugh Bonneville
- Cinematography: Laurent Dailland
- Edited by: Yann Malcor
- Music by: Patrick Doyle
- Distributed by: ARP Sélection (France)
- Release dates: 10 February 2005 (Berlinale); 13 April 2005 (France)
- Running time: 122 minutes
- Countries: France; South Africa; United Kingdom
- Language: English
- Budget: €21.2 million
- Box office: $3.5 million

Man to Man is a 2005 historical drama film directed by Régis Wargnier and starring Joseph Fiennes, Kristin Scott Thomas, and Iain Glen. The screenplay concerns a man in a team of Victorian scientists conducting research in Africa, who begins to have doubts about the human cost of their mission. It was scripted by William Boyd.

== Plot ==
In 1870, Victorian scientists capture a pygmy couple during an expedition in Central Africa. They are transported back to the United Kingdom for further study as part of research involving the theory of the evolution of man. However, the primitive outlook of the pygmies and the sophisticated methods used by the scientists, as well as the complications of adapting to a foreign environment, make their anthropological study more difficult. Ultimately, as the pygmies become more absorbed into the public, major disagreements erupt culminating in a bloody and tragic confrontation.

== Cast ==
- Joseph Fiennes as Jamie Dodd
- Kristin Scott Thomas as Elena Van Den Ende
- Iain Glen as Alexander Auchinleck
- Hugh Bonneville as Fraser McBride
- Lomama Boseki as Toko
- Cécile Bayiha as Likola
- Flora Montgomery as Abigail McBride
