= Portrait of Sebastián de Morra =

Painting by Diego Velázquez

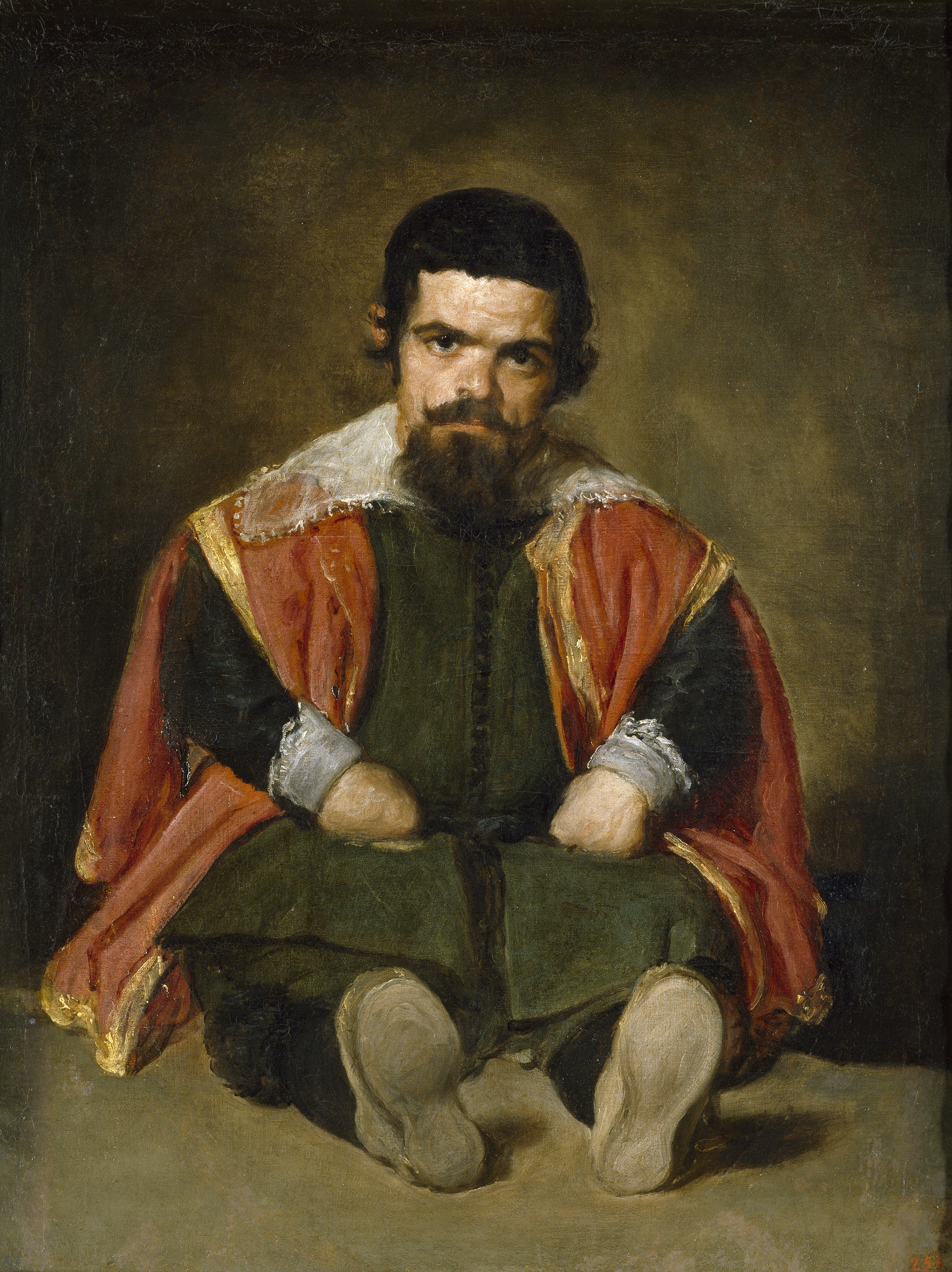
- Artist: Diego Velázquez
- Year: c. 1644
- Medium: Oil on canvas
- Dimensions: 106.5 cm × 81.5 cm (41.9 in × 32.1 in)
- Location: Museo del Prado, Madrid

The Portrait of Sebastián de Morra is a painting by Diego Velázquez of Sebastián de Morra, a court dwarf and jester at the court of Philip IV of Spain. It was painted around 1644 and is now in the Prado in Madrid. Not much is documented about De Morra's life, other than the fact that he was brought to Spain by Philip IV in 1643 and served the court for six years before his death in 1649.

It was not until Velázquez became a court painter that he showed dwarfs with a warmer and naturalistic style compared to previous paintings. De Morra looks directly at the viewer, motionless, making no hand gestures, leading one critic to suggest that the painting represents a denunciation of the court's treatment of de Morra and other dwarfs. Recently discovered inventories and previous documents relating to De Morra reveal that he was also known by a nickname, El Primo.

== Subject ==
=== Don Sebastián de Morra ===
Sebastián de Morra was acquired by King Philip IV in 1643 from his younger brother Cardinal Infante Fernando. He was then given over to Prince Baltasar Carlos until the prince's death in 1646. De Morra's job was to keep the prince entertained with humor. Following the death of Prince Carlos, De Morra died in October 1649 after six years of service to the court. An analysis of the canvases on which portraits of De Morra and Philip IV were painted, conducted by the Thread Count Automation Project, lead to the conclusion that they were both painted from the same piece of cloth. This conclusion revealed that De Morra's portrait was painted in Fraga, along with Philip's portrait.

=== Court dwarfs ===
Known as sabandijas, 'little serpents', court jester dwarfs were employed by kings as far back as the medieval period. Being either born with a deformity or deformed on purpose at the time of birth, court jesters became slaves to the royal court and family. Because they were seen as entertainment, dwarfs were no longer painted as symbolic figures and instead with a realistic style. Since dwarfs were so prominent in court life, they were also included in paintings with multiple figures. Previous Spanish court painters before Velázquez painted dwarfs with coldness and carelessness, since dwarfs were seen as human pets. Dwarfs were also painted with extreme stiffness and disdain for them was also visible in their portraits.

Court dwarfs were portrayed in paintings as the property of their masters, being summoned back and forth at their master's request. Typically, dwarfs were painted as being obedient and as under the ownership of their masters by placing their hands on the dwarf's head. Dwarfs were seen as only one class higher than animals status-wise. Dwarfs were often painted holding an animal of some kind when with their masters. However, dwarfs with artistic or literature abilities were spared from having to train and play with animals.

Art historian Enriqueta Harris stated that Velázquez's paintings of dwarfs did not belong in the same space as classical paintings that he had done as well. However, Catherine Closet-Crane, author of a critical essay about Velázquez's dwarf portraits, states that the portraits were in fact meant to be seen with other Velázquez portraits. She even discusses that the portraits could also be seen alongside some of Rubens's portraits, such as of philosophers Democritus and Heraclitus. Dwarfs were commonly painted from the fifteenth to eighteenth centuries, but their prominence in art declined afterwards.

== Artist ==
=== Work as court painter ===
Diego Velázquez was born on 1599 in Seville, Spain where he carried out his painting career until he eventually moved to Madrid at age 24. Diego Velázquez's naturalistic style was one of Spain's first introduction to the Caravaggio style that was sweeping across Europe. Velázquez was soon employed as the court painter to Philip IV of Spain in 1628 (age 29). During his time as court painter, Velázquez's work focused mainly on paintings for royal apartments and the court. Diego Velázquez's first piece for King Philip IV was when he was hired to paint his portrait by the Count Duke of Olivares. A court painter's job was to depict the royal family and the court in a positive light. Velázquez's painting so impressed King Philip that he hired Velasquez as the chamber's painter, with administrative duties being among a few of the other jobs he also held in the palace. Velázquez is known for having completed at least ten dwarf portraits. These paintings are on display in the Prado in Madrid.

== Visual analysis ==
=== Composition and style ===
Famous for capturing great detail in his realistic style paintings, Velázquez demonstrates these qualities in his portrait of Sebastián de Morra. By painting Morra from a straight-on view, Velázquez managed to highlight Morra's obvious resentment of his physical nature and the disability itself. De Morra is placed against a plain dark background with no objects in sight. The structure of the painting was originally oval instead of a square, as evident in markings on the canvas. Missing pieces in the corners are also evidence that the canvas was meant to be fit in an oval stretcher. In 1734 a fire destroyed the Real Alcazar of Madrid where the portrait of De Morra was held. This could have been the reason the canvas was cut irregularly, to save it from further fire damage. The wall in the painting itself is believed to have been scorched by a fire of unknown origin. The lack of a background leads to the conclusion that De Morra is alienated from the outside world and a normal social life. De Morra's right side of his face is in shadow due to the tilted angle of his head and light source on the left. The light source helps to ground the figure, for it would have appeared he was floating in space in an otherwise dark background. The white collar and cuffs on De Morra's outfit are made out of expensive lace material, which cause the viewer to pay closer attention to his hands and face. The red and gold trimmed cape around his figure help draw the viewers gaze from the cape towards his face. The cape and collar around De Morra's head bare a similar appearance to the military coat worn by Philip IV. De Morra's hands are resting on his side, in which Velázquez did not include any finger appendages.

=== Artist's personal view ===
Diego Velázquez's decency was one of his most well known characteristics, which was illustrated in his portraits of dwarfs and fools. Contrary to common Spanish criticism, Velázquez painted dwarfs because he felt there was beauty in painting truth, not simply to capture ugliness. Instead of depicting dwarfs as simple deformed entertainers, Velázquez showed dwarfs with humanity that at times surpassed other men of the court. Velazquez showed his sympathy for court jesters in his paintings/studies after being surrounded by dwarfs for years on while employed by the royal court. Velázquez painted dwarfs with the same humanity that he did for the royal family in order to wanted to show that dwarfs were no less as human beings. However, while Velázquez's naturalistic and charitable depictions of the invalids and dwarfs maintained by the court strongly suggests he, as court painter, felt some empathy with their situation, the painter's opinions are never specifically stated in any documented fashion. As slaves to the royal court though, Velázquez took it upon himself to illustrate how court jesters felt and were seen as to the rest of the world. Velázquez's closer than otherwise normal studies of court jesters are concluded as a result of his admiration of their jokes and humor.

== Identification controversy ==
There has been some arguments made that the Portrait of Sebastián de Morra is actually that of another dwarf known as "El Primo." A bill from the Archivo de Palacio states that a dwarf painted at Fraga is actually named El Primo. El Primo was previously known to have been the nickname of another dwarf, Diego de Acedo. El Primo was first identified to be the name of the portrait of De Acedo in a catalogue by Pedro de Madrazo in 1872. The portrait was previously unnamed until Madrazo matched a description of a painting the King received with similar clothing to the portrait of De Acedo. The problem is that other inventories have identified De Morra's portrait as El Primo as well. In 1952, José Manuel Pita published an inventory list from 1689 of the Marquess of Carpio in Madrid that describes the painting of De Morra in specific detail, named as El Primo. A later inventory from 1692 of the same collector also gives the name El Primo to De Morra's portrait. What is known about the El Primo is that he was a buffoon who worked for the Count-Duke Olivares. It is documented that Diego de Acedo was the equivalent of a modern-day civil servant for the house and was not a buffoon, leading to the conclusion that De Acedo and El Primo were not the same person. Due to the contradicting nature of multiple documents and inventories, it is impossible to definitively resolve this mystery.

== See also ==
- List of works by Diego Velázquez

Sebastian de Morra is also the principal protagonist in The Cardinal's Man by Merlin Sinclair, a fictitious account of his life in which he serves as a spy for Cardinal Richelieu.
