= Cécile Bayiha =

Cameroonian actress

- Occupation: actress

Cécile Bayiha is an actress from Cameroon. She is best known for playing the part of captive Pygmy Likola in the 2005 Franco-British-South African film Man to Man, in which two captured Pygmies are presented to a 19th-century British public. Bayiha is not a Pygmy herself, but a short-statured person or "proportionate dwarf".
