= Jeffrey Hudson =

English court dwarf

Queen Henrietta Maria with Sir Jeffrey Hudson (1633) by Anthony van Dyck

Jeffrey Hudson (1619 – c. 1682) was a court dwarf of the English queen Henrietta Maria of France. He was famous as the "Queen's dwarf" and "Lord Minimus" and was considered one of the "wonders of the age" because of his extreme but well-proportioned smallness. He fought with the Royalists in the English Civil War and fled with the Queen to France but was expelled from her court when he killed a man in a duel. He was captured by Barbary pirates and spent 25 years enslaved in North Africa before being ransomed back to England.

== Early life and rise to prominence ==
Hudson was baptised in Oakham in Rutland on 14 June 1619. His parents, three brothers, and a half-sister were all of average size. Hudson's father, John, was keeper of the baiting bulls for George Villiers, Duke of Buckingham. Hudson's marvellous smallness and normal proportions became apparent in early childhood. Various theories existed for his size, including that his mother choked on a gherkin while pregnant, but he probably had a growth hormone deficiency caused by a pituitary gland disorder.

In 1626, Jeffrey Hudson was presented to the Duchess of Buckingham as a "rarity of nature", and she invited him to join the household. A few months later, the Duke and Duchess entertained King Charles I and his young French wife, Queen Henrietta Maria, in London. The climax of the lavish banquet was the presentation of Jeffrey to the Queen, served in a large pie. When the pie was placed in front of the Queen, Hudson arose from the crust, 18 inches (46 centimetres) tall and dressed in a miniature suit of armour. The Queen was delighted, and the Duke and Duchess of Buckingham offered Hudson to her as an amusing gift.

== Hudson at the Queen's court ==
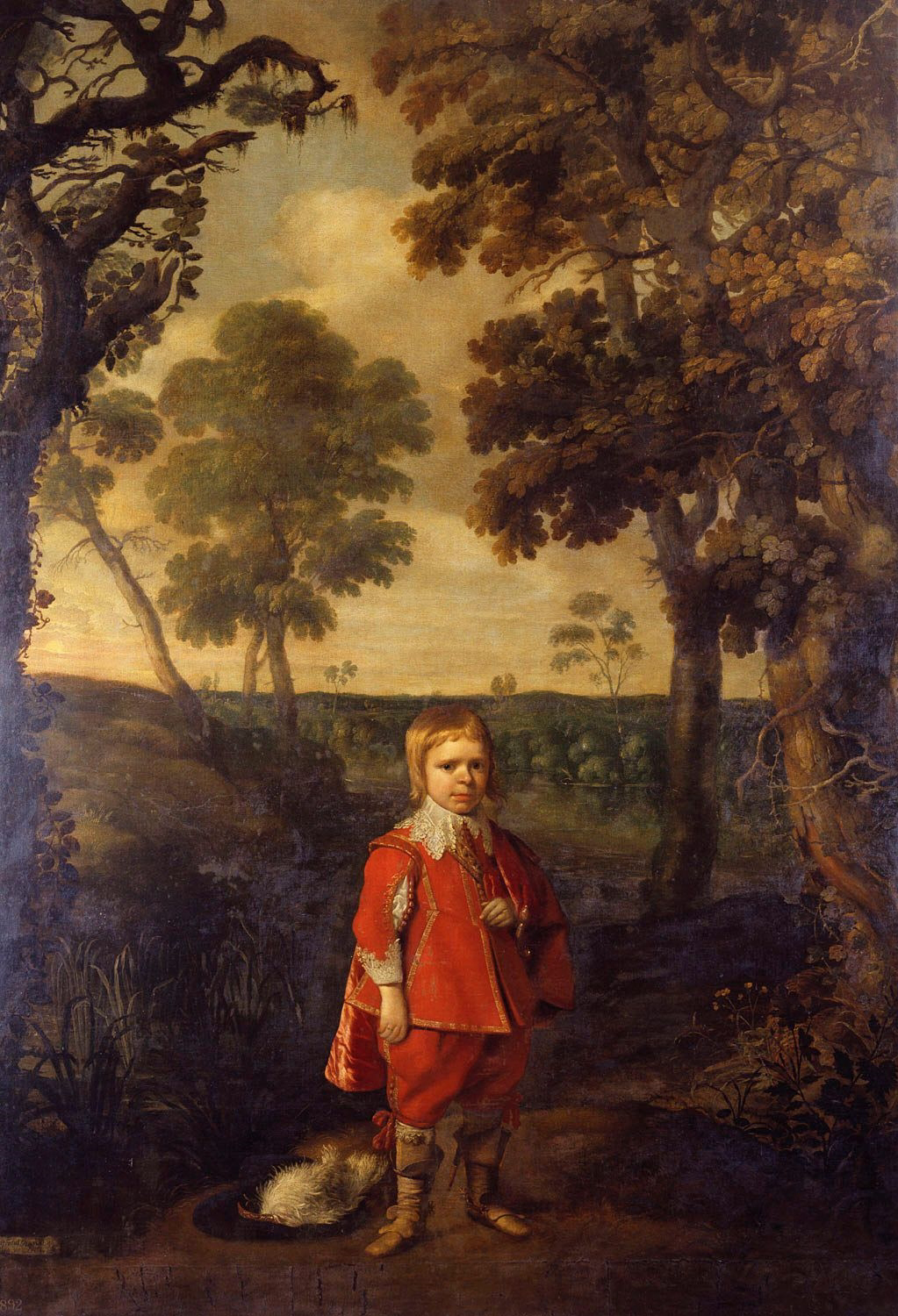
Hudson in the woods (c. 1627–1630) by Daniel Mytens

Hudson moved into Denmark House in London in late 1626, where the Queen maintained her royal household, with its many French attendants and Catholic priests. He was one of several natural curiosities and pets, among whom were a giant Welsh porter named William Evans, two disproportionate dwarves, and a monkey called Pug. He later developed a routine with Evans in which the porter pulled Hudson out of his pocket along with a loaf of bread and proceeded to make a sandwich. As he matured, Hudson learned to amuse and entertain with his wit, courtly behaviour, and appearance. Dwarves were not rare in the courts of Europe, but Hudson's proportions and tiny size made him uniquely famous. His size was repeatedly described as 18 or 19 inches (46 or 48 cm), and he was reported to have grown little between 7 and 30 years of age.

Hudson was often cast in picturesque roles in the elaborate costumed masques which were staged by Inigo Jones for the amusement of the court. A pair of his boots and a "masking-suit" were included in John Tradescant's cabinet of rarities in the 1650s.

Hudson rode a horse with the queen and her household. Sidesaddles were provided for ten ladies and three laundry maids, while the "dwarffe" was provided with an elaborate livery saddle of velvet with laces and silver and silk fringes. Daniel Mytens was commissioned to paint his portrait, "a picture at large of Jeffry the dwarf in a wood or wilderness", for £40 in 1627. In 1628, Mytens made a double portrait of Hudson and Henrietta Maria. Three versions costing £80 each were made as gifts. These pictures do not survive.

Charles I and Henrietta Maria with Jeffrey Hudson and an African groom, by Daniel Mytens

Hubert Le Sueur made armour for Hudson. The court tailor, Gilbert Morrett, made clothes for Hudson. He had "an ash colour barracan suit with sleeves", "a black mourning suit of Flanders say", and scarlet hose to wear under his armour. The Queen's tailor, George Gillin, made clothes for the female dwarf Sarah, or "little Sara", including an Italian gown of scarlet baize. Hudson and Sarah were dressed in the same fabrics as Henrietta Maria's children. For the Shrove-tide masque in 1630, Chloridia, Hudson was "richly apparelled, as a prince of Hell, attended by six infernal spirits".

In 1630, Hudson was included in a mission to France at about ten years of age. Although the principal purpose of the mission was to return with a midwife for the Queen's first pregnancy, Hudson was likely sent for the appreciation of the French court. On the return journey across the English Channel, their ship was captured by Dunkirk pirates, who plundered the ship. Hudson, the musician and choreographer Jacques Cordier dit Bochan, and the royal midwife Madame Peronne were taken prisoner. They were eventually released and returned to England. Hudson's second trip across the channel occurred in 1637, at age 18, when a group of courtiers travelled to the Netherlands to observe the siege of Breda, as the Dutch were attempting to expel the Spanish army.

== Coming of the Civil War and the dissolution of the court ==
By 1640, the relationship between King Charles and the Parliament had deteriorated to plots and attempted arrests. Armed conflict broke out between the Royalists and the Parliamentarians in 1642. As Charles led the Royalist army, the Queen took a small number of her retinue, including Hudson, to the Netherlands to raise money and support for him. By selling articles from her palace, she raised enough to buy some supplies for the Royalist army but was unsuccessful in obtaining official support from the Protestant Dutch government. She returned to England with her courtiers, and they found themselves in the middle of a civil war.

They were able to join Royalist forces at Oxford. The Queen appointed Hudson a "Captain of Horse". It is not known whether he commanded troops or saw combat in one of Prince Rupert's cavalry raids. Still, he considered the appointment an honour rather than a joke and continued to style himself as "Captain Jeffery Hudson" later in life.

As it became apparent that the war was broadening rather than concluding, the Queen fled to France in 1643 with a small group of courtiers and household staff, again including Hudson. Although they were warmly received in France and provided with space in the Louvre Palace, the Queen was ailing after a difficult delivery, and she soon moved her court in exile to the spa at Nevers.

== Duel and disaster ==
Royalist courtiers collected around the Queen, but Hudson had no interest in resuming his role of pet or clown and let it be known he would suffer no more jokes or insults. There is no record of the precise offence offered, but in October 1644, Hudson challenged the brother of William Crofts to a duel. Crofts arrived at the duel brandishing a large water squirt, (Note: A squirt works like a syringe. The person using it would have placed the tapered end into a water source and sucked water inside by pulling out the top handle slowly. The water would then be 'squirted' out, pushing the water through the cylinder and onto the fire.) but his flippancy would lead to his death, as Hudson fatally shot him in the forehead. Crofts's death was a disaster for Hudson. Duelling had been outlawed in France, and this could be considered a transgression against hospitality, in addition to William Crofts being a powerful figure as the Queen's Master of Horse and head of her lifeguard. Hudson was initially sentenced to death, but Henrietta Maria interceded for his life, and he was sent back to England.

== Slavery and redemption, poverty and death ==
Hudson's movements after leaving the Queen's court in late 1644, aged 25 years, are unknown. Within months, he was on a ship captured by Barbary pirates. Hudson was enslaved in North Africa, where he spent perhaps his next 25 years labouring. The date and circumstances of his rescue or redemption are not known. In the 1660s, several missions were sent from England to Algeria and Tunis to ransom English captives, and his first documented presence back in England was in 1669. No details of his captivity were recorded except that he claimed to have grown to 45 inches (110 centimetres) during this time, doubling his height after 30 years of age, which he attributed to the hardships he had suffered.

The few contemporary records of Hudson's years between 1669 and his death in 1682 consist of a few receipts for grants of money from the Duke of Buckingham and the new King. He did not return to the Queen's court, even after the royal Restoration in 1660 and her return at the invitation of her son, Charles II. She resided in London for only five years, fleeing to France during the London plague of 1665. She died in France in 1669, when Hudson first reappeared in English records.

Hudson lived in Oakham for several years, where he was interviewed and a short record of his life made, by James Wright the antiquarian. In 1676, Hudson returned to London, perhaps to seek a pension from the royal court. He had the misfortune of arriving at a time of turbulent anti-Catholic activity, which included the "Popish Plot" of Titus Oates (also from Oakham) and was imprisoned "for a considerable time" at the Gatehouse Prison. Being a Roman Catholic was his only recorded offence, but he was not released until 1680. He died about two years later on an unknown date, in unknown circumstances, buried in an unmarked Catholic paupers' grave. A payment from Charles II in 1681 is the last record of Hudson.

== See also ==
- List of slaves
- Peveril of the Peak, an 1823 novel by Walter Scott, with Sir Geoffrey Hudson as a character
- Richard Gibson (painter) – another Stuart dwarf
