= Józef Boruwłaski =

Polish noble

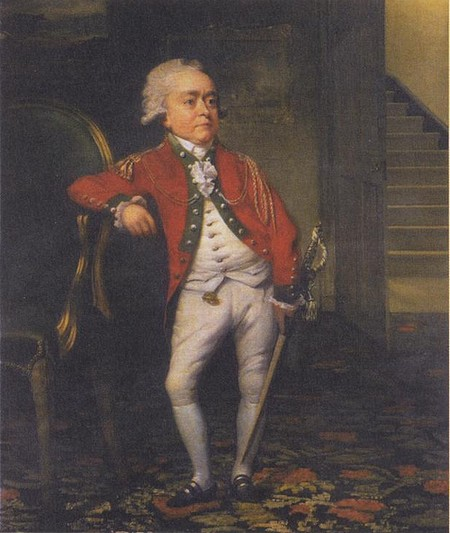
Portrait of Boruwłaski by Philip Reinagle, 1782

Józef Boruwłaski (November 1739–September 5, 1837) was a Polish-born dwarf who was employed by the court and who was also a musician who toured in European and Turkish courts.

== Early life ==
Józef Boruwłaski was born in November 1739, near Halych in what was then the Kingdom of Poland, but which is now in modern day Ukraine. His parents seem to have been impoverished gentry. Boruwłaski's parents have been described as "middle sized", and Boruwłaski became known for his restricted growth. By the age of 3, he measured around one foot in height and barely reached three feet tall as an adult. Two of his five siblings were also short, but he did have a brother who grew to be 6 feet 4 inches (1.93 m) in height who later died in battle as a soldier.

Boruwłaski's father died when he was 9, leaving his mother to care for the six children. Unable to afford to support them all, she allowed the shorter ones to be adopted into noble households. Boruwłaski first adopted by Madame Jaorlicka, the widow of the Starostin of Kahorlik, who supported his education. Following her marriage to Count de Tarnon, Boruwłaski was taken in by an acquaintance, Madame Humieck. It is speculated that the Jaorlicka may have believed the old superstition that a woman who sees a dwarf during pregnancy may give birth to a dwarf.

== European tour ==
When Boruwłaski was fifteen and 64 cm (25 inches) tall, the countess took him to Vienna, where he was presented to Empress Maria Theresa, a lady Boruwłaski later described as the 'Queen of Hungary'. Well-mannered Boruwłaski apparently impressed one of the empress's children so much that she gave him a diamond ring. The story that this child was the young Marie Antoinette (then called Maria Antonia) does not fit the dates – Boruwłaski may have become confused because all the daughters of the empress had the first name 'Maria'.

Later the countess took him to Lunéville to see the ex-king of Poland, Stanisław Leszczyński. There he aroused the jealousy of Nicolas Ferry, the court dwarf of the Leszczyński household, who was nicknamed Bébé. On one occasion Ferry attacked Boruwłaski and tried to throw him into the fire; Leszczyński separated them and had Ferry whipped.

Next, in 1760, the countess took Boruwłaski to Paris, where he frequented the court in various masked balls and pageants. He also developed a habit of drinking nothing but water, apparently keeping himself fit in this way. He was reported to have reached 71 cm (28 inches) in height at 22 years of age.

The next stop was The Hague where he reportedly impressed the court ladies. On their road to Warsaw through Germany, Boruwłaski became enamored of an actress in a company of French comedians. His feelings were not reciprocated.

== Stanisław II of Poland ==
When Stanisław II acceded to the throne of Poland, he took Boruwłaski under his protection. When Boruwłaski fell in love with the new companion of the countess, Isalina Barbutan, the countess threw him out. The King interceded on his behalf, giving him a small allowance and a coach to travel in, and, with the royal backing, he married Isalina. At first, Isalina, the child of a French couple who had settled in Poland, was reluctant to marry Józef, but he bombarded her with love-letters and won her heart.

At the age of 25, Boruwłaski stood 89 cm (35 inches tall), and five years later, measured 99 cm (39 inches), which was to be his final height, although his friend the comedian Charles Mathews believed that he continued to grow into old age.

== A further tour ==
He decided to take a new tour and left Warsaw November 1780 with his wife and royal letters of introduction. In Kraków Isalina gave birth to a daughter and they reached Vienna in February 1781. In Vienna he was introduced to British ambassador Robert Murray Keith who invited him to England. Meanwhile, Boruwłaski gave concerts in Vienna, playing his own compositions. Józef was a good violinist and guitarist, and was able to dance while playing the guitar, even when he was quite old.

From Vienna they toured in Germany, Turkey and to the north. When they eventually decided to depart for England, their ship almost sank in a storm before it reached Margate. In London, Boruwłaski obtained the patronage of the Duke of Devonshire and of his famous wife Georgiana, Duchess of Devonshire. Józef was even presented to the future King George IV and eventually to the rest of the royal family. George IV presented him with two different watches, one of which was given when George was still Prince of Wales. Józef used the title Comte (Count) Boruwłaski and organized subscription concerts. He also met the Irish giant Patrick Cotter and the famously overweight Daniel Lambert.

In 1783–1786 he toured in Scotland and Ireland. Hearing rumours that Józef was earning good money from his music, the King of Poland withdrew his allowance. Boruwłaski returned briefly to Poland for a while but soon returned and by July 1791 was touring again and in 1795 was again in Ireland. English appearances at this time included York in 1785 and 1789, and Leeds and Beverley in the early 1790s.

On a visit to Birmingham he met with Matthew Boulton and visited his Soho Mint.

In 1788, while living in England, Boruwłaski published the first edition of his autobiography.

== Money problems ==
Although he was sometimes able to make a reasonable living from his music, the problems and expenses of touring sometimes wore Boruwłaski down. His wife seems to have been a poor traveller, and often pleaded illness and stayed at home. Money problems forced Józef to display himself for money (which he found deeply humiliating) and to bring out three different editions of his autobiography, the last published at Durham in 1820.

== Retirement in Durham ==
Eventually, in his advancing years, Boruwłaski accepted an offer to live in Durham, from Thomas Ebdon, organist of Durham Cathedral. Boruwłaski lived in Banks Cottage, Durham with the unmarried daughters of Thomas Ebdon, and purchased an annuity for his retirement years. The annuity had been bought from a local grocer who, Józef claimed in his autobiography, had thought that a dwarf like Józef would not live much longer.

Since Józef's friend Ebdon was a freemason, it may have been through him that on 7 October 1806, Boruwłaski was made an honorary member of the Durham Granby lodge.

Józef was also close friends with another important resident of Durham, the actor Stephen Kemble of the famous Kemble family.

In Durham Boruwłaski also became a passionate angler, becoming the first Polish person to describe the artificial fly technique.

== Death and memorials ==
Józef Boruwłaski died in Durham, on September 5, 1837, at the age of 97. Józef was buried in Durham Cathedral, as was his friend in life Stephen Kemble. Whilst the grave of Kemble (which is in the Chapel of the Nine Altars) has a large stone slab with an inscription, the last resting place of Józef Boruwłaski is marked simply with the initials J.B. on a flagstone. It can be found on the floor in the north west nave of the cathedral, under the RAF Memorial Window.

There is a life-size statue of him in the Durham Town Hall, together with a small display of his personal effects, including a suit, hat, cane, chair and violin. The Town Hall also has a large oil painting of Józef as an old man. A tetrastyle Greek temple, restored in 2007, stands on the banks of the River Wear at Durham: this is called the 'Count's House' and its position suggests that it may have been an ornamental folly in the Count's garden. There is a collection of documents relating to the man Durham people called 'the Little Count' at the Palace Green library of Durham University.
