= Ovitz family =

Hungarian Jewish actors/traveling musicians: Auschwitz survivors

The Ovitz siblings

The Ovitz family was a family of Hungarian Jewish actors/traveling musicians originating from present Romania, who survived imprisonment at the Auschwitz concentration camp during World War II. Most of them were dwarfs. They were the largest family of dwarfs ever recorded and were the largest family to enter Auschwitz and survive intact; the family of twelve ranged from a 15-month-old baby to a 58-year-old woman.

== Origin ==
The Ovitz family originated from Maramureș County, Romania. They were descended from Shimson Eizik Ovitz (1868–1923), a badchen entertainer, itinerant rabbi and himself a dwarf. He fathered ten children in total, seven of them dwarfs (born with pseudoachondroplasia), from two marriages.

The children from his first marriage to Brana Fruchter (she was of average height), Rozika (1886–1984) and Franzika (1889–1980), were both dwarfs. Shimson's second wife, Batia Bertha Husz, also of average height, produced the following children: Avram (1903–1972; dwarf), Freida (1905–1975; dwarf), Sarah (1907–1993; average height), Micki (1909–1972; dwarf), Leah (1911–1987; average height), Elizabeth (1914–1992; dwarf), Arie (1917–1944; average height), and Piroska (a.k.a. "Perla"; 1921–2001; dwarf).

== Lilliput Troupe ==
The children founded their own ensemble, the Lilliput Troupe. They sang and played music using small instruments and performed all over Romania, Hungary and Czechoslovakia in the 1930s and 1940s. The taller relatives helped backstage. The Ovitzes sang in Yiddish, Hungarian, Romanian, Russian and German. When they were not touring, they lived in a single house with their spouses.

At the start of World War II, there were 12 family members, seven of them dwarfs. When Hungary seized Northern Transylvania in September 1940, the new racial laws banned Jewish artists from entertaining non-Jews. Though the Ovitzes were observant Jews, they obtained papers which omitted the fact that they were Jewish and continued going on their tours until 1944. On 12 May 1944, all twelve family members were deported to Auschwitz. One average sized brother, Arie, escaped the round-up but was later arrested and executed in 1944.

== Auschwitz ==
Once in the concentration camp Auschwitz, the Ovitzes attracted the attention of the German camp physician Josef Mengele (known as the Angel of Death). Mengele collected curiosities for pseudoscientific experiments on heredity. He separated the Ovitzes from the rest of the camp inmates to add them to his collection of test subjects. He was curious about the fact that the family included both dwarfs and taller members. Eleven other prisoners of the Shlomovitz family claimed to be their relatives, and Mengele moved all of them accordingly.

Mengele arranged to have special living quarters built for them so they could be monitored. To keep them healthy for his human experimentation, he arranged for them to have more hygienic living conditions, better food and their own bedclothes. Mengele allowed them to keep their own clothes. The taller members of the family were required to carry the dwarfs to the experimentation sites. The family were told that they were to put on a show for the Schutzstaffel (SS) guards at their huge canteen. When the dwarfs arrived, Mengele ordered them strip whilst he spoke about his own ideas about genetics.

The Ovitzes were subjected to various tests. Mengele's team of physicians extracted bone marrow and pulled out teeth and hair to find signs of hereditary disease. They poured hot and cold water in the dwarfs' ears and blinded them with chemical drops. Gynecologists inspected the married women. Eighteen-month-old Shimshon Ovitz was put through the worst ordeals because he had taller parents and was prematurely born. Mengele drew blood from the veins behind his ears and from his fingers on a daily basis, often causing weakness. The Ovitzes also witnessed when two newcomer dwarfs were killed and boiled so their bones could be exhibited in a museum. Mengele also filmed them; this film was not found after the war, and it is possible that he kept it when he fled.

The Ovitzes expected to be killed after Mengele had finished his experiments, but they lived to see the liberation of Auschwitz on 27 January 1945. The Red Army took them to the Soviet Union where they lived in a refugee camp for some time before they were released.

If I was a healthy Jewish girl, 1 meter 70 tall, I would have been gassed like the hundreds of thousands of other Jews in my country. So if I ever wondered why I was born a dwarf, my answer would have to be that my handicap, my deformity, was God's only way to keep me alive.

— Perla Ovitz, Giants: The Dwarfs of Auschwitz

== Aftermath ==
The Ovitzes traveled on foot for seven months to their home village. They found their home looted, so they moved on, first to the town of Sighet and later to Belgium. In May 1949, they emigrated to Israel, settling in Haifa. They started touring again, achieving success and packing large concert halls. In 1955, they retired and bought a cinema hall.

Descendants of the dwarf men of the family were born taller; the women did not become pregnant due to their small pelvises. The firstborn of the dwarfs, Rozika Ovitz, died in 1984 at the age of 98. The last adult dwarf survivor of the family, Perla Ovitz, died in 2001.

== Media ==
In March 2013, Warwick Davis presented "The Seven Dwarfs of Auschwitz", an episode of the television series Perspectives on ITV. The episode describes the story of the Ovitz family, including an interview with Perla Ovitz recorded in 1999 for a documentary film, Liebe Perla (German: "Dear Perla").

A fictional version of the family and the cinema in Haifa, Israel, that they ran is featured in the 2010 Israeli film The Matchmaker.

== See also ==
- Alexander Katan
