= Nicolas Ferry =

French dwarf

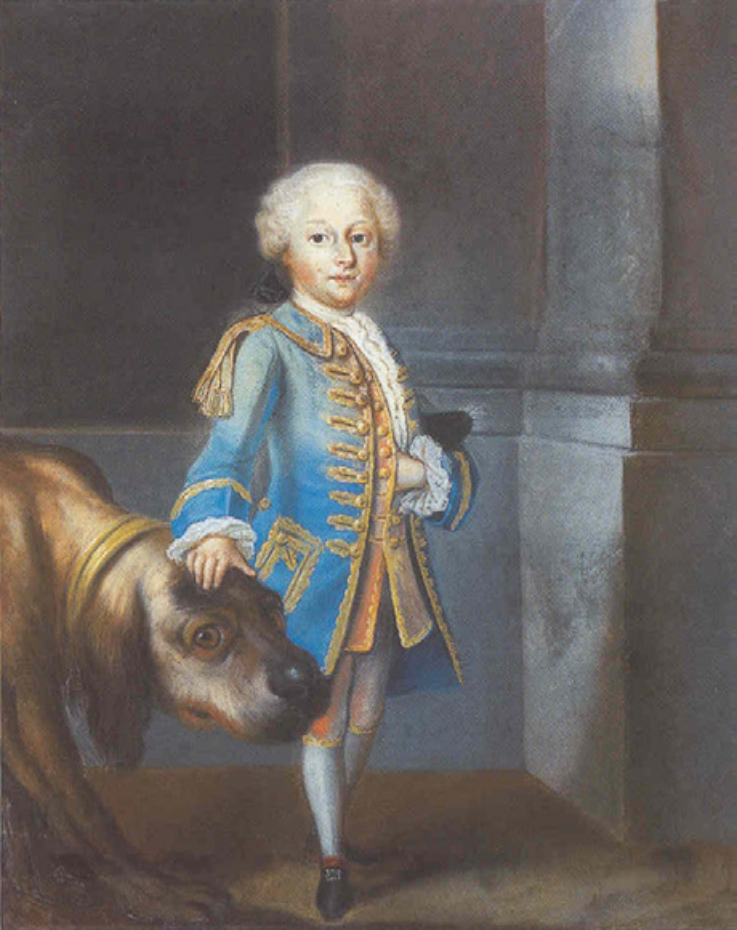
Portrait of Ferry

Nicolas Ferry (known as Bébé) (1741–1764) was a French dwarf who became renowned throughout Europe as the court dwarf of King Stanisław Leszczyński.

== Early life and discovery ==
Nicolas Ferry was born on 14 October 1741 in Plaine, Alsace, France, the son of a farmer and his wife. He was unusually small at birth and continued to grow slowly, although all contemporary sources and surviving portraits agree that his limbs and features were in proportion to his height ("proportionate dwarfism"). His fame spread, and in 1746, he was visited by ladies from the court of Stanisław, who was also the Duke of Lorraine and maintained a court at Lunéville, although he was no longer King of Poland. Stanisław sent his physician to examine the child, who was now five years old and approximately 24 inches (60 cm) tall, and subsequently sent for him. He offered Ferry's parents money in return for their son, who was to be maintained and educated in the Leszczyński household as the court dwarf.

== Life at court ==
At court, Ferry quickly acquired the nickname Bébé ("Baby"). He was given to the queen as a birthday present in 1746, and, after her death in 1747, one of his main benefactors became Princesse de Talmont (1735-1762). He had tutors, but proved to be of relatively low intelligence and is reported never to have learned to read or write. A small wooden house was built for him in one of the halls of the Chateau de Lunéville, and he was spoiled and indulged by his master and the entire court. He played practical jokes on visitors and often behaved very badly, but he was the king's favourite and a great attraction. Those entertained by his antics included the Duc du Richelieu and Voltaire.

In 1759, the Polish dwarf Józef Boruwłaski visited the court. He was a witty, urbane young man of 20, shorter than Ferry and well versed in court manners. Unflattering comparisons were drawn, and Ferry became so angry that he attacked Boruwłaski and tried to throw him onto the fire. The indulgent Stanisław ordered Ferry beaten for this outrage, reportedly to his severe shock and mortification.

Ferry was also compared unfavourably with Boruwłaski by the aristocratic writer, scientist and physician Louis-Élisabeth de La Vergne de Tressan, who visited the Lunéville court to receive an honour from Stanisław. De Tressan later delivered a paper to the French Academy of Sciences likening Ferry to an animal in comparison with the intelligent, well-educated Polish dwarf.

Ferry remained at Stanisław's court throughout his life, eventually growing to a height of 34 inches (86 cm).

== Decline and death ==
Ferry's health declined in his late teens. He developed a hunchback and had difficulty walking, and he suffered wasting of the soft tissues and signs of premature aging. Eventually he became incontinent and a chronic invalid, and died on 8 June 1764; aged 22. His skeleton was prepared and mounted for study, and is currently kept at the Musée de l'Homme in Paris. The rest of his remains were buried in the church at Lunéville; when the church was destroyed during the French Revolution, Ferry's inscribed mausoleum was preserved and is now at the Chateau de Lunéville. Some of Ferry's outfits are preserved in the historical museum at Nancy and there are a number of wax statues of him still in existence. A unique Luneville Faience statue of Ferry, 22 inches (56 cm) tall, modelled from life, was kept at the Chateau de Lunéville, but was destroyed in a fire in 2003.

In 2006 and 2008, French researchers published detailed studies of Ferry's skeletal remains, with particular attention to his jaws and facial bones. They concluded that Ferry suffered from a rare genetic form of primordial dwarfism characterised by small, abnormal teeth without roots, and dubbed the condition NMOSR.
