= Sophia Jagiellon, Duchess of Brunswick-Lüneburg =

Polish princess (1522–1575)

Sophia Jagiellon
- Princess of Poland
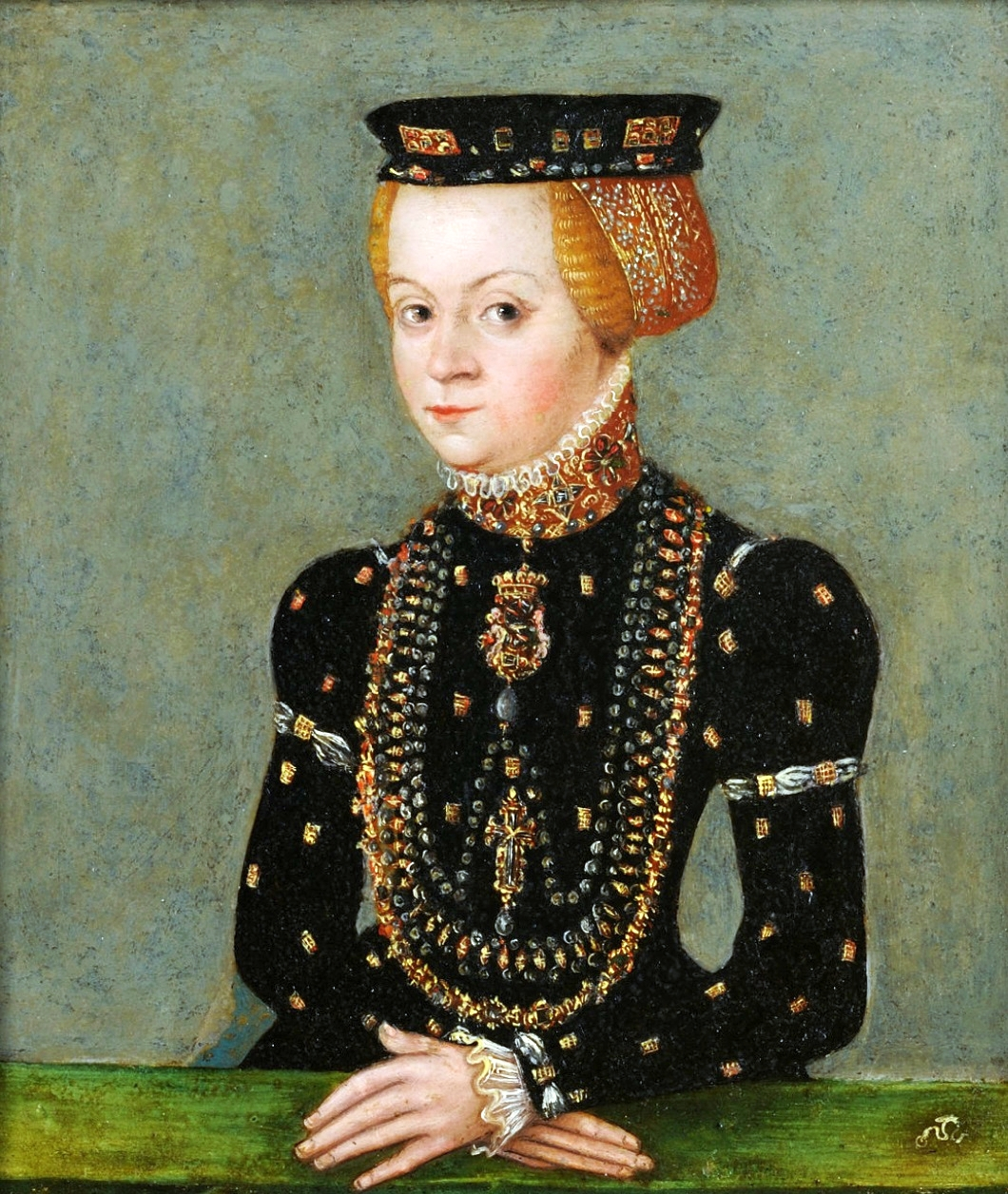
- Portrait by Lucas Cranach the Younger (c. 1553)

Duchess consort of Brunswick-Wolfenbüttel
- Tenure: 1556–1568
- Born: 13 July 1522; Kraków, Poland
- Died: 28 May 1575 (aged 52); Schöningen, Brunswick-Wolfenbüttel, Holy Roman Empire
- Burial: Church of the Blessed Virgin Mary, Wolfenbüttel
- Spouse: Henry V, Duke of Brunswick-Lüneburg
- Dynasty: Jagiellon
- Father: Sigismund I the Old
- Mother: Bona Sforza
- Religion: Lutheranism prev. Roman Catholicism

Sophia Jagiellon (Polish: Zofia Jagiellonka; Lithuanian: Sofija Jogailaitė; 13 July 1522 – 28 May 1575) was a princess of the Kingdom of Poland and of the Grand Duchy of Lithuania, a member of the Jagiellonian dynasty as a daughter of Sigismund I the Old, and from 1556 to 1568 also was the Duchess of Brunswick-Wolfenbüttel by her marriage with Duke Henry V.

== Life ==
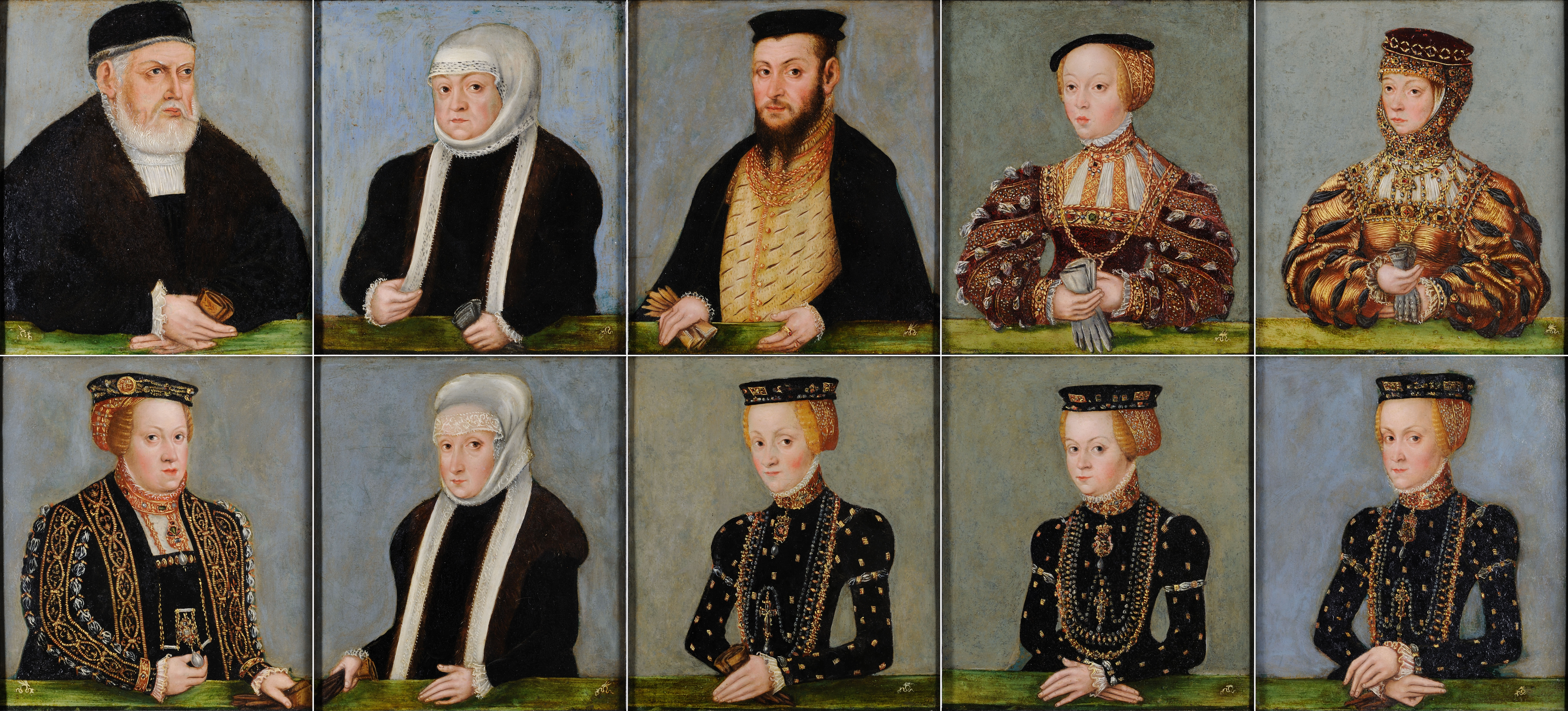
Jagiellon family of Sigismund I, Sophia second to last on the bottom row

Sophia was born in Kraków, a daughter of King Sigismund I of Poland (1467–1548) and his second wife, the Italian princess Bona Sforza (1494–1557). She was the third of her parents' six children and raised at the royal court of Wawel Castle with her siblings including Isabella Jagiellon, Sigismund II Augustus, Anna Jagiellon, Catherine Jagiellon and Albert Jagiellon.

=== Duchess of Brunswick-Wolfenbüttel ===
When in 1548 her mother Bona Sforza entered into conflict with her son King Sigismund II Augustus over the marriage with his mistress Barbara Radziwiłł, Sophia and her sisters were removed from the Kraków court to live in Masovia.

Between 22 and 25 February 1556 she married the 66-year-old Duke Henry V of Brunswick-Wolfenbüttel. The Catholic duke had been a loyal supporter of the Habsburg emperor Charles V in the Schmalkaldic War. He had been firstly married to Princess Mary (died 1541), a daughter of Count Henry of Württemberg. The couple had eight children, though only one surviving son, Prince Julius, whose elder brothers were killed in the 1553 Battle of Sievershausen. His father considered him an incapable ruler and wished for another heir to the throne; however, the second marriage with Sophia proved childless. She was accompanied to Germany with a retinue of 500 courtiers, among whom Agnieszka was to be her influential confidante and favorite.

=== Widowhood ===
On 11 June 1568 Sophia was widowed. After the death of her husband she retired to the families residence in Schöningen. Shortly after, she fell into dispute with her stepson Duke Julius of Brunswick-Wolfenbüttel; the conflict, which concerned the scope of princely rule in the Schöningen estates, ended on 17 January 1572 when both signed an agreement. Julius, however, did not honor the terms and in 1573 Sophia had to ask for help from Emperor Maximilian II.

In the spring of 1570 Sophia converted to Lutheranism and therefore was the first and only Protestant member of the Jagiellonian dynasty. She died on 28 May 1575 at Schöningen Castle. She is buried in the Church of the Blessed Virgin Mary in Wolfenbüttel.

== Ancestry ==
Ancestors of Sophia Jagiellon, Duchess of Brunswick-Lüneburg

8. Władysław II Jagiełło, King of Poland
4. Casimir IV Jagiellon, King of Poland
9. Sophia of Halshany
2. Sigismund I the Old
10. Albert II of Germany
5. Elizabeth of Austria
11. Elizabeth of Luxembourg
1. Sophia Jagiellon
12. Galeazzo Maria Sforza
6. Gian Galeazzo Sforza
13. Bona of Savoy
3. Bona Sforza
14. Alfonso II of Naples
7. Isabella of Naples
15. Ippolita Maria Sforza

Sophia Jagiellon, Duchess of Brunswick-Lüneburg Jagiellonian dynasty Born: 13 July 1522 Died: 28 May 1575
German royalty
Preceded by Marie of Württemberg	Duchess consort of Brunswick-Lüneburg; 1556–1568	Succeeded by Hedwig of Brandenburg
Titles in pretence
Preceded by Sigismund II Augustus	Brienne claim 1572–1575	Succeeded by Anna Jagiellon
