= Alexander Katan =

Dutch accountant and translator (1899–1943)

- Born: 18 November 1899; Rotterdam, Netherlands
- Died: 27 January 1943 (aged 43); Mauthausen, Austria
- Occupations: Accountant; teacher; translator
- Spouse: Julia Sophie Elze
- Children: Alphons Katan

Alexander Katan (18 November 1899 – 27 January 1943) was a Dutch Jewish accountant, translator, and teacher, who was murdered by the Nazis in the Holocaust, after which time his photographs were notoriously on display in various museums.

== Biography ==
Alexander Katan was born in Rotterdam, one of eight children in a Jewish family. He had spondyloepiphyseal dysplasia congenita, a rare disorder of bone growth that results in dwarfism. He used a wheelchair.

As an adult, he moved to Leeuwarden and married Julia Sophie Elze. She was also a dwarf. They had one son, Alphons, born in 1930. He was of average height.

Katan devoted himself to study, ultimately mastering six languages and working as an accountant and a translator, as well as tutoring students in his home.

== Holocaust ==
Katan was arrested by the Germans in July 1942, ostensibly due to his and his family's refusal to wear the Jewish star the Nazis required Jews to wear on their clothing. His wife and son were arrested soon afterwards.

Katan was taken first to Amersfoort concentration camp. A few months later, on November 3, 1942, he arrived at Mauthausen concentration camp. He was assigned the number 13992.

Shortly after arrival at Mauthausen, the camp's doctors started to subject Katan to a number of medical experiments. They considered his short stature and bent spine to be the embodiment of "Jewish degeneration". They also photographed him first clothed in his concentration camp prisoner garb, then naked. Katan was killed on January 27, 1943, with an injection to the heart, ordered by Karl-Joseph Gross. Gross then stripped his flesh from his bones, and reassembled them for display. Katan's skeleton was taken to the SS Medical Academy near the University of Graz.

Katan's wife was sent to Ravensbrück concentration camp and then to Auschwitz concentration camp. Upon arrival, she was immediately murdered (gassed). Josef Mengele had not yet begun working in Auschwitz at the time Sophie was taken there; he would later gain a notorious reputation for his medical experiments on dwarfs.

Their son Alphons was transported to Westerbork but was ultimately released due to the efforts of his aunt, who argued, untruthfully, that Alphons' non-dwarf stature indicated that he was not Katan's son.

== Post-Holocaust ==
Following the end of the Holocaust, Mauthausen concentration camp was opened for visitors. Four photographs of Katan were kept on prominent display in the museum there: Katan dressed in his concentration camp prison garb, a frontal naked photo, a rear naked photo, and a photo of his skeleton. In 1994, Alphons Katan went to Mauthausen to visit the place he believed to be his father's final resting place, but was horrified to see his father's photographs on display, first stripped of clothing, then of flesh. Alphons Katan worked to get the photographs removed from display at Mauthausen, a mission that was ultimately successful. He continues to try to find his father's bones to give them a decent burial.

In 2000, Dutch documentary filmmaker Hedda van Gennep published the film Dood Spoor? (Dutch for: "Dead End?") that tells the story of the son's quest to have the photographs removed.
