= Zoltan Vajo =

Hungarian/American scientist

- Born: 1967 (age 58–59); Budapest, Hungary
- Education: Semmelweis University (Doctor of Medicine); National Academy of Sciences, Budapest, Hungary (PhD)
- Known for: COQ7
- Children: Adam, 1997
- Scientific career
- Fields: Genetics, Immunology
- Workplaces: National Institutes of Health, Bethesda, Maryland, USA; Semmelweis University; Veterans Administration Medical Center, Phoenix, Arizona.

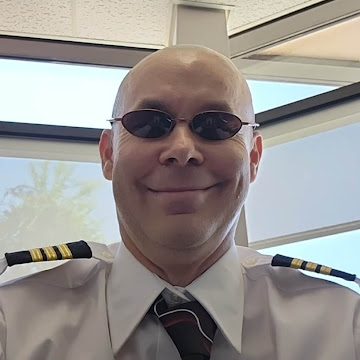
Zoltan Vajo in 2023

Zoltan Vajo is a Hungarian American scientist, best known for his contributions to the Human Genome Project, including cloning the COQ7 gene, characterizing the human CLK-1 timing protein cDNA and its potential effect on aging, and research on the molecular and genetic background of skeletal dysplasias and fibroblast growth factor receptor 3 disorders, including Achondroplasia, SADDAN (severe achondroplasia with developmental delay and acanthosis nigricans), Thanatophoric dysplasia, Muenke coronal craniosynostosis and Crouzon syndrome as well as more recently on genetically engineered insulin analog molecules, including their structure, metabolic effects and cellular processing and the role of recombinant DNA technology in the treatment of diabetes.

== Contributions ==
Vajo et al. in 1999 cloned COQ7 from human heart. They found that the predicted protein contains 179 amino acids, is mostly helical, and contains an alpha-helical membrane insertion. It has a potential N-glycosylation site, a phosphorylation site for protein kinase C and another for casein kinase II, and 3 N-myristoylation sites. Northern blot analysis detected 3 transcripts; a 1-kb transcript was predominant in heart, and a 3-kb transcript was predominant in skeletal muscle, kidney, and pancreas.

Vajo et al. found in 2000 that alterations in venous reactivity to alpha- and beta-adrenergic, nitric oxide (NO)-dependent, and other drugs are present in many genetically determined and acquired conditions, such as hypertension, smoking, and aging.

In 2001, Fawcett, Bennett, Hamel, Vajo and Duckworth showed that the effect of human insulin and its analogues on protein degradation vary significantly in different cell types and with different experimental conditions. The differences seen in the action of the insulin analogues cannot be attributed to binding differences only. Post-receptor mechanisms, including intracellular processing and degradation, must be also considered. Since then, recombinant DNA technology and the use of insulin analogues has become a major part of the treatment of diabetes.

More recently (2007-2024), Vajo et al. developed novel influenza vaccines based on reverse genetics technology, including vaccines against the highly pathogenic H5N1 bird flu and the H1N1 swine flu viruses, as well as seasonal influenza. In preparation for the influenza pandemic, Vajo and Jankovics showed that instead of the conventionally used split virion or subunit vaccines, lower doses of whole virus vaccines are able to induce sufficient immune responses even against newly emerged influenza virus strains in pediatric adult and elderly patients, without increasing the rate of adverse events. This was achieved in part by using aluminum phosphate as an adjuvant. These vaccines were used to combat the 2009 swine flu pandemic. The technologies developed during the preparation for an influenza pandemic were successfully translated into the production of reduced dose, seasonal trivalent influenza vaccines, which since have been licensed for clinical use. Vajo has also worked on the standardization of serological assays for influenza and the evaluations of influenza vaccines.

== Important publications ==
- Vajo Z, King LM, Jonassen T, et al. (October 1999). "Conservation of the Caenorhabditis elegans timing gene clk-1 from yeast to human: a gene required for ubiquinone biosynthesis with potential implications for aging". Mammalian Genome. 10 (10): 1000–4. doi:10.1007/s003359901147. PMID 10501970. S2CID 13800512.
- Vajo Z, Dachman W, Szekacs B (May 2000). "Alterations of venous drug reactivity in humans: acquired and genetic factors". Angiology. 51 (5): 361–6. doi:10.1177/000331970005100502. PMID 10826852. S2CID 2040036.
- Vajo Z, Francomano CA, Wilkin DJ (February 2000). "The molecular and genetic basis of fibroblast growth factor receptor 3 disorders: the achondroplasia family of skeletal dysplasias, Muenke craniosynostosis, and Crouzon syndrome with acanthosis nigricans". Endocrine Reviews. 21 (1): 23–39. doi:10.1210/edrv.21.1.0387. PMID 10696568. S2CID 43581040.
- Rustin P, Von Kleist-Retzow, J.-C, Vajo Z, Rotig A, Munnich A. (April 2000). "For debate: defective mitochondria, free radicals, cell death, aging-reality or myth-ochondria?". Mechanisms of Ageing and Development. 114 (3): 201–206. doi:10.1016/S0047-6374(00)00102-0. PMID 10802124. S2CID 27395914.
- Vajo Z, Duckworth W (March 2000). "Genetically engineered insulin analogs: Diabetes in the new millennium". Pharmacological Reviews. 52 (1): 1–9. PMID 10699152.
- Vajo Z, Fawcet J, Duckworth W (October 2001). "Recombinant DNA technology in the treatment of diabetes: insulin analogs". Endocrine Reviews. 22 (5): 706–17. doi:10.1210/edrv.22.5.0442. PMID 11588149.
- Fawcett J, Hamel FG, Bennett RG, Vajo Z, Duckworth WC (April 2001). "Insulin and analogue effects on protein degradation in different cell types. Dissociation between binding and activity". Journal of Biological Chemistry. 276 (15): 11552–8. doi:10.1074/jbc.M007988200. PMID 11116143.
- Vajo Z, Kosa L, Visontay I, Jankovics M, Jankovics I (May 2007). "Inactivated whole virus influenza A (H5N1) vaccine". Emerg Infect Dis. 13 (5): 807–8. doi:10.3201/eid1305.061248. PMC 2738456. PMID 18044056.
- Vajo Z, Tamas F, Sinka L, Jankovics I (January 2010). "Safety and immunogenicity of a 2009 pandemic influenza A H1N1 vaccine when administered alone or simultaneously with the seasonal influenza vaccine for the 2009-10 influenza season: a multicentre, randomised controlled trial". Lancet. 375 (9708): 49–55. doi:10.1016/S0140-6736(09)62039-0. PMID 20018367. S2CID 19512258.
- Vajo Z, Wood J, Kosa L, Szilvasy I, Paragh G, Pauliny Z, Bartha K, Visontay I, Kis A, Jankovics I (February 2010). "A single-dose influenza A (H5N1) vaccine safe and immunogenic in adult and elderly patients: an approach to pandemic vaccine development". J. Virol. 84 (3): 1237–42. doi:10.1128/JVI.01894-09. PMC 2812344. PMID 19906909.
- Vajo Z, Kosa L, Szilvasy I, Pauliny Z, Bartha K, Visontay I, Kis A, Tarjan I, Rozsa N, Jankovics I (December 2008). "Safety and immunogenicity of a prepandemic influenza A (H5N1) vaccine in children". Pediatric Infectious Disease Journal. 27 (12): 1052–6. doi:10.1097/INF.0b013e3181861dd7. PMID 18978514. S2CID 12628452.,
- Vajo Z, Tamas F, Jankovics I (March 2012). "A reduced-dose seasonal trivalent influenza vaccine is safe and immunogenic in adult and elderly patients in a randomized controlled trial". Clinical and Vaccine Immunology. 19 (3): 313–8. doi:10.1128/CVI.05619-11. PMC 3294605. PMID 22219315.
- Vajo Z, Kalabay L, Vajo P, Balaton G, Rozsa N, Torzsa P (Jan 2019). "Licensing the first reduced, 6 µg dose whole virion, aluminum adjuvanted seasonal influenza vaccine - A randomized-controlled multicenter trial". Vaccine. 37 (2): 258–264. doi:10.1016/j.vaccine.2018.11.039. PMID 30497837. S2CID 54166208.
- Vajo Z, Laszlofy C (Oct 2024). "Developing Correlates of Protection for Vaccines Is Needed More than Ever-Influenza, COVID-19 and RSV Infection". Viruses. 16 (11): 1671. doi:10.3390/v16111671. PMC 11598905. PMID 39599786.

== In the media ==
On CNN, July 29, 2007

The Doctors' Channel, December 23, 2008

The Daily Miner, April 16, 2010: KRMC doctor on Swiss flu vaccine safety board

The Daily Miner, July 12, 2010

A hokiedző, aki gént fedezett fel a humángenom projektben
