= Dabogratinib =

Investigational selective FGFR3 inhibitor

Dabogratinib INN: dabogratinib
- Chemical structure

Clinical data
- Other names: TYRA-300; TYRA300
- Routes of administration: Oral
- Drug class: Tyrosine kinase inhibitor

Legal status
- Legal status: Investigational

Identifiers
- IUPAC name: 5-[(1R)-1-(3,5-dichloro-4-pyridinyl)ethoxy]-3-[6-(2-methylsulfonyl-2,6-diazaspiro[3.3]heptan-6-yl)-3-pyridinyl]-1H-indazole
- CAS Number: 2800223-30-5
- PubChem CID: 170647464
- IUPHAR/BPS: 13809
- UNII: FH245S2JZJ
- ChEMBL: ChEMBL5595500
- PDB ligand: A1AV2 (PDBe, RCSB PDB)

Chemical and physical data
- Formula: C_{25}H_{24}Cl_{2}N_{6}O_{3}S
- Molar mass: 559.47 g·mol^{−1}
- 3D model (JSmol): Interactive image
- SMILES: C[C@@H](OC1=CC=C2NN=C(C2=C1)C3=CC=C(N=C3)N4CC5(C4)CN(C5)S(C)(=O)=O)C6=C(Cl)C=NC=C6Cl
- InChI: InChI=InChI=1S/C25H24Cl2N6O3S/c1-15(23-19(26)9-28-10-20(23)27)36-17-4-5-21-18(7-17)24(31-30-21)16-3-6-22(29-8-16)32-11-25(12-32)13-33(14-25)37(2,34)35/h3-10,15H,11-14H2,1-2H3,(H,30,31)/t15-/m1/s1; Key:JOAFWIHZEBKYQK-OAHLLOKOSA-N

Dabogratinib, formerly known by its development code TYRA-300, is an investigational, orally administered small-molecule tyrosine kinase inhibitor that selectively targets fibroblast growth factor receptor 3 (FGFR3). It is being developed by Tyra Biosciences for FGFR3-associated cancers and achondroplasia.

As of October 2026, its clinical development included studies in urothelial carcinoma, non-muscle-invasive bladder cancer, and children with achondroplasia. AdisInsight listed phase II development for achondroplasia, bladder cancer, and urogenital cancer, and phase I/II development for solid tumors.

== Pharmacology ==
=== Mechanism of action ===
FGFR3 is a receptor tyrosine kinase involved in cellular proliferation, differentiation, and survival. Dabogratinib inhibits FGFR3-mediated signaling. The National Cancer Institute describes its activity against activating FGFR3 alterations, including the V555L and V555M gatekeeper mutations.

Dabogratinib was designed to preferentially inhibit FGFR3 over the related receptors FGFR1, FGFR2, and FGFR4. The discovery paper described this selectivity as an approach intended to limit effects associated with inhibition of other FGFR family members while retaining activity against FGFR3 gatekeeper mutations.

=== Preclinical research ===
A paper published in Molecular Cancer Therapeutics reported laboratory and animal studies of dabogratinib. In bladder cancer cell lines containing FGFR3 alterations, treatment reduced downstream signaling. In a xenograft model driven by the FGFR3 S249C mutation, the investigators reported dose-dependent inhibition of tumor growth, with tumor regression at the highest tested doses.

== Clinical development ==
=== Oncology ===
SURF301 is a multicenter, open-label phase I/II study investigating the safety, tolerability, pharmacokinetics, and preliminary antitumor activity of dabogratinib in advanced urothelial carcinoma and other solid tumors with activating FGFR3 alterations. The 2026 Molecular Cancer Therapeutics paper also described three patient cases from this first-in-human study.

SURF302 investigates dabogratinib in FGFR3-altered, low-grade, intermediate-risk non-muscle-invasive bladder cancer. Its primary endpoint is the complete response rate at three months; secondary endpoints include recurrence, duration of response, progression, and safety.

SURF303 investigates dabogratinib in low-grade upper tract urothelial carcinoma. Its primary endpoint is complete response within six months among participants with FGFR3-positive disease.

=== Skeletal dysplasias ===
BEACH301 is a multicenter, open-label phase II study in children aged three to ten years with achondroplasia and open growth plates. Its design includes dose escalation and dose expansion, with cohorts for children who have not previously received growth-accelerating treatment and those who have received such treatment.

AdisInsight also listed a preclinical development program in hypochondroplasia and an orphan drug designation for achondroplasia.

=== Clinical studies ===
Selected clinical studies of dabogratinib
Study	Phase	Investigated condition	Registry identifier
SURF301	I/II	Advanced urothelial carcinoma and other FGFR3-altered solid tumors	NCT05544552
SURF302	II	FGFR3-altered, low-grade, intermediate-risk non-muscle-invasive bladder cancer	NCT06995677
SURF303	II	Low-grade upper tract urothelial carcinoma	NCT07265947
BEACH301	II	Pediatric achondroplasia	NCT06842355

== Chemistry ==
Dabogratinib has the molecular formula C_{25}H_{24}Cl_{2}N_{6}O_{3}S and a molar mass of approximately 559.47 g/mol. Its structure contains an indazole ring system, two pyridine rings, an ether linkage, and a substituted diazaspiroheptane group. The molecule has one defined stereocenter.

Chemical identifiers include the CAS Registry Number 2800223-30-5, PubChem compound identifier 170647464, and Unique Ingredient Identifier FH245S2JZJ.

== History ==
Tyra Biosciences developed the compound under the name TYRA-300 using a structure-based drug design approach. Its discovery and medicinal chemistry were described in a 2024 paper in the Journal of Medicinal Chemistry. Subsequent publications and development records identify the compound as dabogratinib.
