= Infigratinib =

Medication

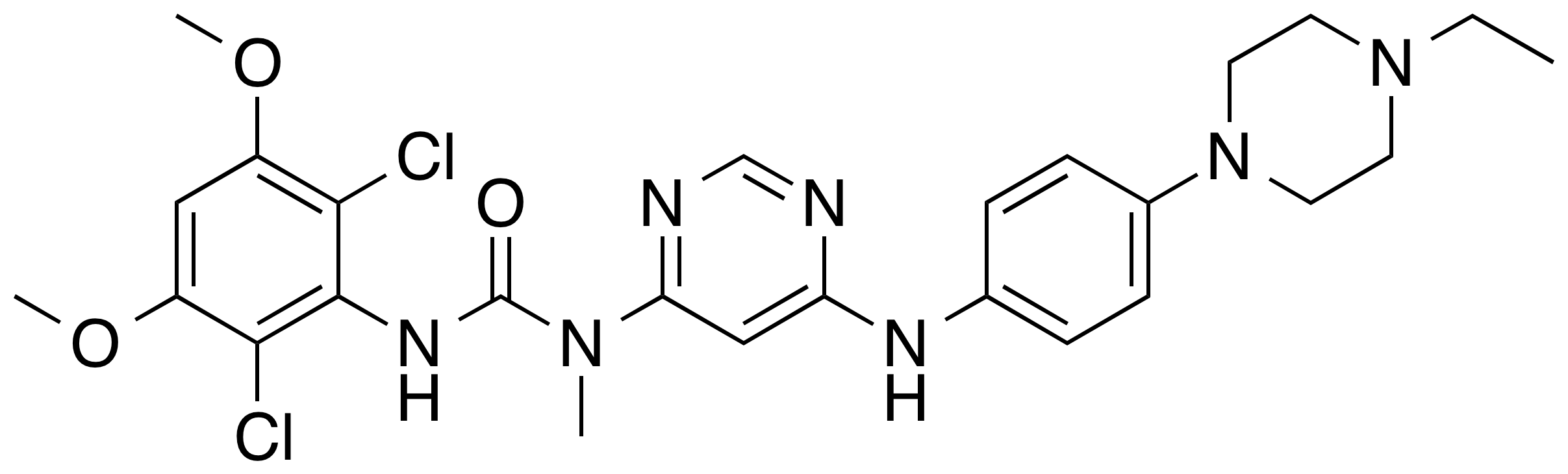

Clinical data
- Trade names: Truseltiq
- Other names: BGJ-398
- AHFS/Drugs.com: Monograph
- MedlinePlus: a621041
- License data: US DailyMed: Infigratinib
- Pregnancy category: AU: D
- Routes of administration: By mouth
- Drug class: Tyrosine kinase inhibitor
- ATC code: L01EN03 (WHO)

Legal status
- Legal status: AU: S4 (Prescription only); CA: ℞-only; US: ℞-only

Identifiers
- CAS Number: 872511-34-7
- PubChem CID: 53235510
- DrugBank: DB11886
- ChemSpider: 26333103
- UNII: A4055ME1VK
- KEGG: D11589
- CompTox Dashboard (EPA): DTXSID70236238

Chemical and physical data
- Formula: C_{26}H_{31}Cl_{2}N_{7}O_{3}
- Molar mass: 560.48 g·mol^{−1}
- 3D model (JSmol): Interactive image
- SMILES: CCN1CCN(c2ccc(Nc3cc(N(C)C(=O)Nc4c(Cl)c(OC)cc(OC)c4Cl)ncn3)cc2)CC1
- InChI: InChI=1S/C26H31Cl2N7O3/c1-5-34-10-12-35(13-11-34)18-8-6-17(7-9-18)31-21-15-22(30-16-29-21)33(2)26(36)32-25-23(27)19(37-3)14-20(38-4)24(25)28/h6-9,14-16H,5,10-13H2,1-4H3,(H,32,36)(H,29,30,31); Key:QADPYRIHXKWUSV-UHFFFAOYSA-N

Infigratinib is an kinase inhibitor in development for the treatment of achondroplasia and hypochondroplasia.

Infigratinib is an oral small molecule that targets the fibroblast growth factor receptors FGFR1, FGFR2, and FGFR3. Unlike other therapeutics in development or approved for achondroplasia, it is a daily oral capsule.

== History ==
Infigratinib is currently in clinical trials for the treatment of children with achondroplasia and hypochondroplasia, conditions caused by variants in the FGFR3 gene.

Recent Phase 3 clinical trial results for infigratinib demonstrated an improvement in annualized growth velocity of +2.1 cm/yr compared to placebo, the largest reported in any Phase 3 trial for achondroplasia. Infigratinib also demonstrated a statistically significant change in upper-to-lower body proportionality in children 3-8 years of age. There were no treatment-related serious adverse events, and the drug was well-tolerated.

Earlier Phase 2 results of infigratinib for the treatment of achondroplasia were published in The New England Journal of Medicine.

== Society and culture ==
=== Legal status ===
Infigratinib received Breakthrough Therapy Designation from the FDA, the first therapeutic option in development for achondroplasia to receive this designation. Infigratinib was designated an orphan drug by the FDA and the European Medicines Agency in 2021. It was previously approved for medical use for bile duct cancer under the FDA's accelerated approval program in May 2021 at a significantly higher dose than that used for achondroplasia or hypochondroplasia.
