= Rhizomelic dysplasia, scoliosis, and retinitis pigmentosa =

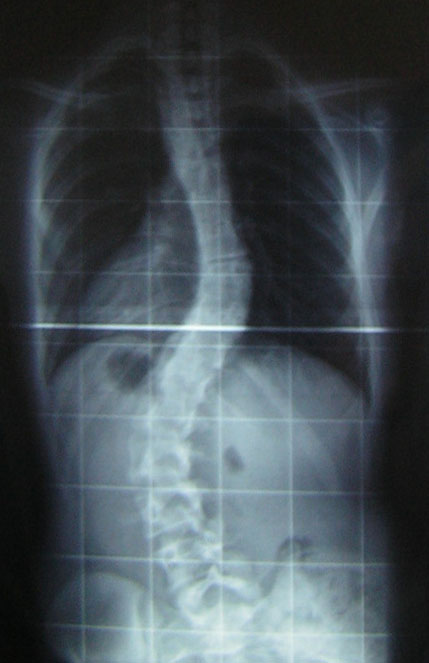
- Specialty: Medical genetics
- Symptoms: Ocular, visual, dental and skeletal
- Usual onset: Birth
- Duration: Lifelong
- Causes: Genetic mutation
- Prevention: none
- Prognosis: Good
- Frequency: very rare, only 2 cases have been described in medical literature
- Deaths: -

Rhizomelic dysplasia, scoliosis, and retinitis pigmentosa is a very rare genetic disorder which is characterized by ocular/visual, dental and osseous anomalies. Only 2 cases have been described in medical literature.

== Signs and symptoms ==
The following is a list of symptoms that this disorder causes:

- Amelogenesis imperfecta
- Biconcave vertebrae
- Wide ribs
- Photophobia
- Deltoid tuberosity prominence
- Reduced visual acuity
- Limb rhizomelia
- Cone-rod dystrophy
- Scoliosis
- Shortening of the clavicles
- Shortening of the ribs
- Short neck
- Shortening of the humerus
- Strabismus
- Vision impairment
- Short radius bone epiphysis
- Retinitis pigmentosa
- Short stature

== Etymology ==
This condition was first described in 2006 by Megarbane et al. when they described two cousins from a consanguineous Lebanese family. Only one of them had amelogenesis imperfecta.
