= Severe achondroplasia with developmental delay and acanthosis nigricans =

- Other names: SADDAN
- Severe achondroplasia with developmental delay and acanthosis nigricans is inheried in an autosomal dominant manner.
- Frequency: 0.0001%

Severe achondroplasia with developmental delay and acanthosis nigricans (SADDAN) is a very rare genetic disorder. This disorder is one that affects bone growth and is characterized by skeletal, brain, and skin abnormalities. Those affected by the disorder are severely short in height and commonly possess shorter arms and legs. In addition, the bones of the legs are often bowed and the affected have smaller chests with shorter rib bones, along with curved collarbones. Other symptoms of the disorder include broad fingers and extra folds of skin on the arms and legs. Developmentally, many individuals who have the disorder show a higher level in delays and disability. Seizures are also common due to structural abnormalities of the brain. Those affected may also experience apnea, the slowing or loss of breath for short periods of time.

Many of the features of SADDAN are similar to those seen in other skeletal disorders, specifically achondroplasia and thanatophoric dysplasia. Achondroplasia is a form of short-limbed dwarfism. This type of dwarfism is caused by the inability of the cartilage of the skeleton to ossify and turn to bone. Acanthosis nigricans is a skin condition in which areas of the skin is of a dark and velvety discoloration, often seen in the body folds and creases such as the armpits, groin, and neck. Within those affected by SADDAN, acanthosis nigricans develops early on, usually in infancy or early childhood.

== Genetic ==
A Lys650Met missense mutation of the FGFR3 gene is what causes SADDAN. This gene codes for the instructions of a protein that is integral in the development and maintenance of bone and brain tissue. Mutations of this gene cause the resultant protein to be constantly activated, causing many characteristics of this disorder.

SADDAN is an autosomal dominant genetic disorder. Autosomal means that the gene responsible for the mutation and disorder is found on a non-sex chromosome (autosome) and that either the mother or father can pass on the gene, while dominant means that only one copy of the gene is required for the individual to have the disorder.

This genetic disorder is extremely rare. While the disorder can be genetically inherited, no instances of inheritance have been recorded as of yet. Rather, of the few cases documented, the individual affected by the disorder is affected as a product of a random mutation, also called a de novo mutation, of the FGFR3 gene only, not by inheritance of the mutated gene.

== Diagnosis ==
Medical diagnosis is required. Clinical tests can be performed, as well as genetic testing. The available genetic tests include:

Sequence analysis of the entire coding region

- Severe achondroplasia with developmental delay and acanthosis nigricans (SADDAN) - Sanger Sequencing: Diagnosis, Mutation Confirmation, Pre-symptomatic, Risk Assessment, Screening
- Craniosynostosis: Diagnosis
- Invitae FGFR3-Related Disorders Test: Pre-symptomatic, Diagnosis, Therapeutic management

Mutation scanning of select exons

- Skeletal Dysplasia Panel: Diagnosis, Prognostic

Sequence analysis of select exons

- Severe Achondroplasia with Developmental Delay and Acanthosis Nigricans (SADDAN, FGFR3): Diagnosis, Mutation Confirmation, Risk Assessment
- Severe Achondroplasia, Developmental Delay, Acanthosis Nigricans: Diagnosis, Mutation Confirmation

Deletion/duplication analysis

- Invitae FGFR3-Related Disorders Test: Pre-symptomatic, Diagnosis, Therapeutic management

== Management ==
Life with SADDAN is manageable, although therapy, surgery, and lifelong doctor surveillance may be required.
