= Navepegritide =

Medication

Clinical data
- Trade names: Yuviwel
- Other names: ACP-015
- AHFS/Drugs.com: Monograph
- MedlinePlus: a626036
- License data: US DailyMed: Navepegritide
- Routes of administration: Subcutaneous injection
- ATC code: None

Legal status
- Legal status: US: ℞-only

Identifiers
- CAS Number: 2413551-27-4
- IUPHAR/BPS: 14293
- DrugBank: DB17824
- UNII: Y3BH8M899D
- KEGG: D13294

Navepegritide, sold under the brand name Yuviwel, is a medication used for the treatment of achondroplasia in children. Navepegritide is a C-type natriuretic peptide analog. It is given by subcutaneous injection.

Navepegritide was approved for medical use in the United States in March 2026.

== Medical uses ==
Navepegritide is indicated to increase linear growth in children aged two years of age and older with achondroplasia (the most common form of dwarfism) with open epiphyses (growth plates).

Achondroplasia is a genetic condition that causes short stature and disproportionate growth. The average height of an adult with achondroplasia is approximately four feet. People with achondroplasia have a genetic mutation that causes a certain growth regulation gene called fibroblast growth factor receptor 3 to be overly active, which prevents normal bone growth. Achondroplasia occurs in approximately 1 in 10,000 to 1 in 30,000 live births per year.

== History ==
The effectiveness of navepegritide was established in a clinical trial that included a randomized, placebo-controlled 52-week double-blind treatment period, followed by a single-arm 52-week open-label extension period (Trial 1; NCT05598320).

The trial enrolled 84 pediatric participants with genetically confirmed achondroplasia who had never received treatment: 57 participants received navepegritide 0.1 mg/kg administered subcutaneously (under the skin) once weekly, and 27 received a placebo.

== Society and culture ==
=== Legal status ===
Navepegritide was approved for medical use in the United States in March 2026. The US Food and Drug Administration (FDA) granted the application for navepegritide priority review designation and accelerated approval.

In October 2026, the Committee for Medicinal Products for Human Use of the European Medicines Agency adopted a positive opinion, recommending the granting of a marketing authorization for the medicinal product Yuviwel, intended for the treatment of achondroplasia in children. The applicant for this medicinal product is Ascendis Pharma Growth Disorders.

=== Names ===
Navepegritide is the international nonproprietary name.

Navepegritide is sold under the brand name Yuviwel.
