= Michael Ain =

American orthopedic surgeon

Michael Ain is an American orthopedic surgeon who is thought to be the first and only surgeon with achondroplasia. He practiced at Johns Hopkins University Hospital.

== Early life and education ==
Ain grew up in Roslyn, Long Island, New York in a Jewish family. His parents were not dwarfs. Ain underwent a corrective osteotomy to straighten his bowed legs by breaking and then resetting them. He attended Phillips Andover Academy followed by Brown University, where he played second base on the varsity baseball team.

== Career ==
Ain was initially rejected from over 20 medical schools, sometimes explicitly due to his dwarfism. When he reapplied the next year, he was accepted to Albany Medical College, from which he graduated in 1989. After one year of pediatrics residency at UC Irvine Medical Center, Ain returned to Albany Medical College for his orthopedic surgery residency. Following his fellowship in pediatric orthopedic surgery, Ain joined the faculty at Johns Hopkins University Hospital in 1995.

Ain was featured in Dwarfs: Not a Fairy Tale in HBO's America Undercover series.

A textbook which featured Ain's photo, and profiled his expertise in the repair of bone defects resulting from achondroplasia, was praised for countering ableism.

== Personal life ==
Ain's wife is 5 feet 6 inches tall. Their daughter, who has achondroplasia, is an attorney.
