= Vepugratinib =

Investigational drug

Clinical data
- Other names: LOX-24350; LOXO-435; LY-3866288

Identifiers
- IUPAC name: 4-[4-[3-chloro-4-[(1S)-1-(5-fluoro-2-pyridinyl)-2-hydroxyethoxy]pyrazolo[1,5-a]pyridin-6-yl]-5-methyltriazol-1-yl]piperidine-1-carbonitrile
- CAS Number: 2833703-74-3
- PubChem CID: 171074967
- IUPHAR/BPS: 14366
- UNII: SN3C4ZE59P
- KEGG: D13203
- ChEMBL: ChEMBL6168351

Chemical and physical data
- Formula: C_{23}H_{22}ClFN_{8}O_{2}
- Molar mass: 496.93 g·mol^{−1}
- 3D model (JSmol): Interactive image
- SMILES: CC1=C(N=NN1C2CCN(CC2)C#N)C3=CN4C(=C(C=N4)Cl)C(=C3)O[C@H](CO)C5=NC=C(C=C5)F
- InChI: InChI=InChI=1S/C23H22ClFN8O2/c1-14-22(29-30-33(14)17-4-6-31(13-26)7-5-17)15-8-20(23-18(24)10-28-32(23)11-15)35-21(12-34)19-3-2-16(25)9-27-19/h2-3,8-11,17,21,34H,4-7,12H2,1H3/t21-/m1/s1; Key:OYUCEQFRNJABJW-OAQYLSRUSA-N

Vepugratinib is an investigational new drug that is being evaluated by Loxo Oncology for the treatment of genitourinary cancer. It is a fibroblast growth factor receptor 3 antagonist.
