= Skull bossing =

Protrusion of the bones of the skull, typically the forehead

Skull bossing is a descriptive term in medical physical examination indicating a protuberance of the skull, most often in the frontal bones of the forehead ("frontal bossing"). Although prominence of the skull bones may be normal, skull bossing may be associated with certain medical conditions, including nutritional, metabolic, hormonal, and hematologic disorders.

== Frontal bossing ==
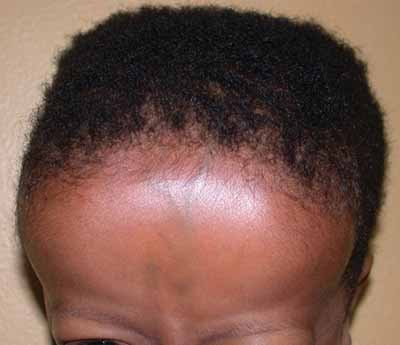
Frontal bossing in a child

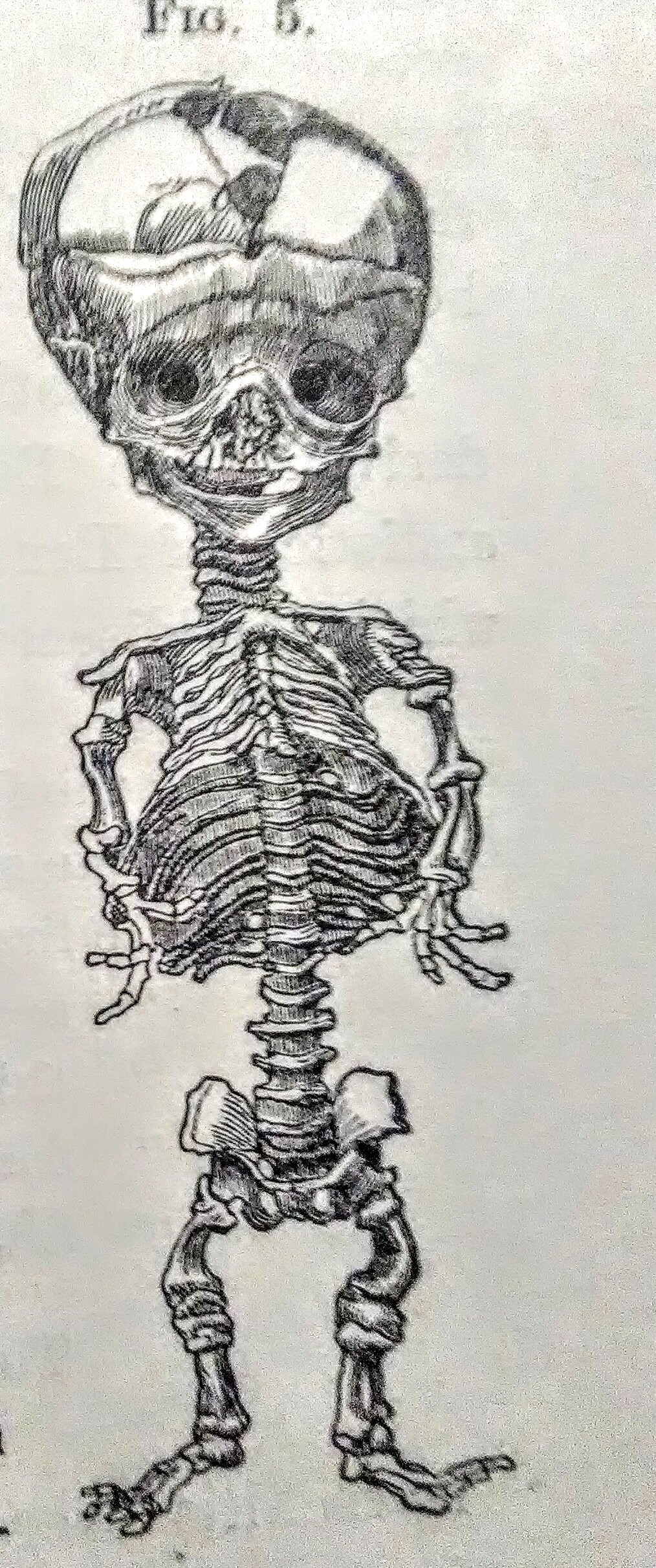
Infant Skeleton with Frontal Bossing, A Treatise of the Diseases of Infancy and Childhood by Dr. Job Lewis Smith, 1881

Frontal bossing is the development of an unusually pronounced forehead which may also be associated with a heavier than normal brow ridge. It is caused by enlargement of the frontal bone, often in conjunction with abnormal enlargement of other facial bones, skull, mandible, and bones of the hands and feet. Frontal bossing may be seen in a few rare medical syndromes such as acromegaly – a chronic medical disorder in which the anterior pituitary gland produces excess growth hormone (GH). Frontal bossing may also occur in diseases resulting in chronic anemia, where there is increased hematopoiesis and enlargement of the medullary cavities of the skull.

== Associated medical disorders ==
- Rickets
- Achondroplasia
- Acromegaly
- Basal cell nevus syndrome
- Congenital syphilis
- Cleidocranial dysostosis
- Crouzon syndrome
- Cryopyrin-Associated Periodic Syndrome (CAPS – PFS)
- Ectodermal dysplasia
- Extramedullary hematopoiesis
- Fragile X syndrome
- Hurler syndrome
- Osteopathia Striata with Cranial Sclerosis
- Pfeiffer syndrome
- Rubinstein-Taybi syndrome
- Russell-Silver syndrome (Russell-Silver dwarf)
- Thanatophoric dysplasia
- Marfan syndrome
- Trimethadione (antiseizure drug) use during pregnancy
- Beta-thalassemia (due to expansion of bone marrow secondary to increased hematopoiesis; see Extramedullary hematopoiesis)
- Hallermann-Streiff syndrome
