= Short-limb skeletal dysplasia with severe combined immunodeficiency =

- Other names: Achondroplasia-SCID syndrome
- Specialty: Medical genetics
- Symptoms: Achondroplasia-like symptoms alongside SCID-like symptoms
- Complications: Infections which may result in premature death
- Usual onset: Birth
- Duration: Lifelong
- Causes: Genetic mutation
- Prevention: None
- Prognosis: Poor
- Frequency: 11 cases reported in medical literature
- Deaths: Out of the 11 cases reported in OMIM, 4 seem to have died.

Short-limb skeletal dysplasia with severe combined immunodeficiency is an extremely rare autosomal recessive type of achondroplasia which is characterized by short stature, bowing of the long bones, and generalized metaphyseal abnormalities alongside signs of SCID such as recurrent severe infections, failure to thrive, chronic diarrhea, and a notable absence of T and B lymphocytes. Around 11 cases have been described in medical literature.
