= Achondroplasia =

Genetic condition, the most common form of dwarfism

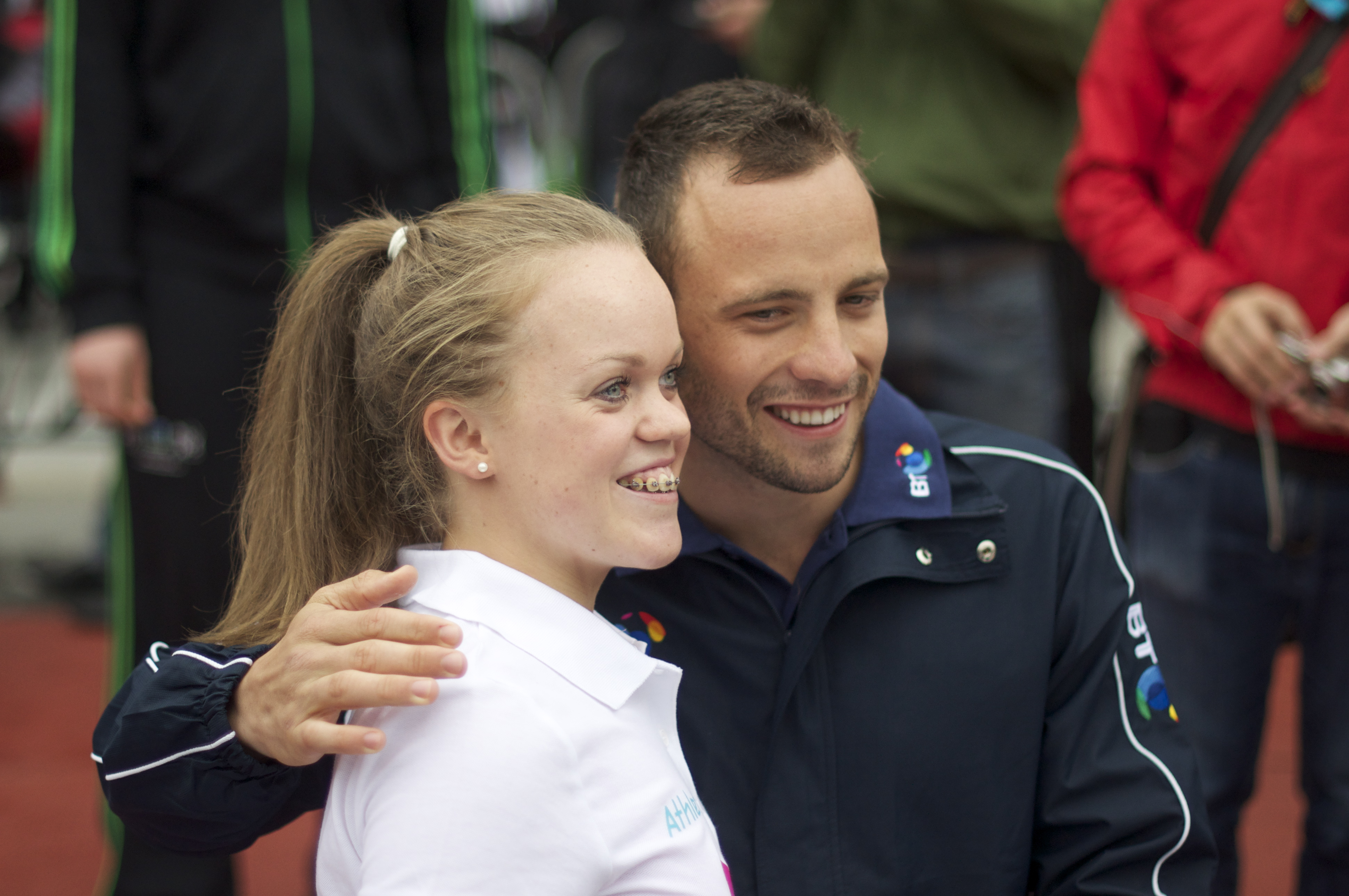
British swimmer Ellie Simmonds

Achondroplasia is a genetic disorder whose primary feature is dwarfism. It is the most common cause of dwarfism and affects about 1 in 27,500 people. In those with the condition, the arms and legs are short, while the torso is typically of normal length. Those affected have an average adult height of 131 centimetres (4 ft 4 in) for males and 123 centimetres (4 ft) for females. Other features can include an enlarged head with prominent forehead (frontal bossing) and underdevelopment of the midface (midface hypoplasia). Complications can include sleep apnea or recurrent ear infections. Achondroplasia includes the extremely rare short-limb skeletal dysplasia with severe combined immunodeficiency.

Achondroplasia is caused by a mutation in the fibroblast growth factor receptor 3 (FGFR3) gene (located in chromosome 4) that results in its protein being overactive. Achondroplasia results in impaired endochondral bone growth (bone growth within cartilage). The disorder has an autosomal dominant mode of inheritance, meaning only one mutated copy of the gene is required for the condition to occur. About 80% of cases occur in children of parents without the disease, and result from a new (de novo, or sporadic) mutation, which most commonly originates as a spontaneous change during spermatogenesis. The rest are inherited from a parent with the condition. The risk of a new mutation increases with the age of the father. In families with two affected parents, children who inherit both affected genes (for which there is a 25% chance) typically die before birth or in early infancy from breathing difficulties. The condition is generally diagnosed based on the clinical features but may be confirmed by genetic testing. Mutations in FGFR3 also cause achondroplasia-related conditions including hypochondroplasia and SADDAN (severe achondroplasia with developmental delay and acanthosis nigricans), a rare disorder of bone growth characterized by skeletal, brain, and skin abnormalities resulting in severe short-limb skeletal dysplasia with severe combined immunodeficiency.

Treatments include small molecule therapy with a C-natriuretic peptide analog (vosoritide), approved to improve growth velocity in children with achondroplasia based on results in Phase 3 human trials, although its long-term effects are unknown. Growth hormone therapy may also be used. Efforts to treat or prevent complications such as obesity, hydrocephalus, obstructive sleep apnea, middle ear infections or spinal stenosis may be required. Support groups exist for those with the condition, such as Little People of America (LPA). Nonprofit physician organizations also exist to disseminate information about treatment and management options, including development of patient resources.

== Signs and symptoms ==
- Disproportionate dwarfism
- Shortening of the proximal limbs (called rhizomelic shortening)
- Short fingers and toes, with "trident hands" (short hands with stubby fingers, and a separation between the middle and ring fingers – reminiscent of a trident on fetal ultrasound)
- Large head with prominent forehead frontal bossing
- Small midface with a flattened nasal bridge
- Spinal kyphosis (convex curvature) or lordosis (concave curvature)
- Varus (bowleg) or valgus (knock knee) deformities
- Frequent ear infections (due to Eustachian tube blockages), sleep apnea (which can be central or obstructive), and hydrocephalus

=== Complications ===
==== Children ====
Children with achondroplasia often have less muscle tone; because of this it is common for them to have delayed walking and motor skills. It is also common for children to have bowed legs, scoliosis, lordosis, arthritis, issues with joint flexibility, breathing problems, ear infections, and crowded teeth. These issues can be treated with surgery, braces, or physical therapy.

Hydrocephalus is a severe effect associated with achondroplasia in children. This condition occurs when cerebrospinal fluid is not able to flow in and out of the skull because of how the spine narrows. This fluid build up is associated with an enlarged head, vomiting, lethargy, headaches, and irritability. A shunt surgery is commonly performed to treat this condition, but an endoscopic third ventriculostomy can also be done.

==== Adults ====
Adults with achondroplasia often face issues with obesity and sleep apnea. It is also typical for adults to experience numbness or tingling in their legs because of nerve compression.

Some research has found that adults with achondroplasia may also experience psychosocial complications, usually associated with short stature.

Pregnancy in women with achondroplasia is considered higher risk. Women with achondroplasia generally have their babies delivered through C-sections to prevent complications that could occur with a natural birth. Intelligence and life span are usually near normal, although craniocervical junction compression increases the risk of death in infancy.

== Causes ==
Autosomal dominant inheritance

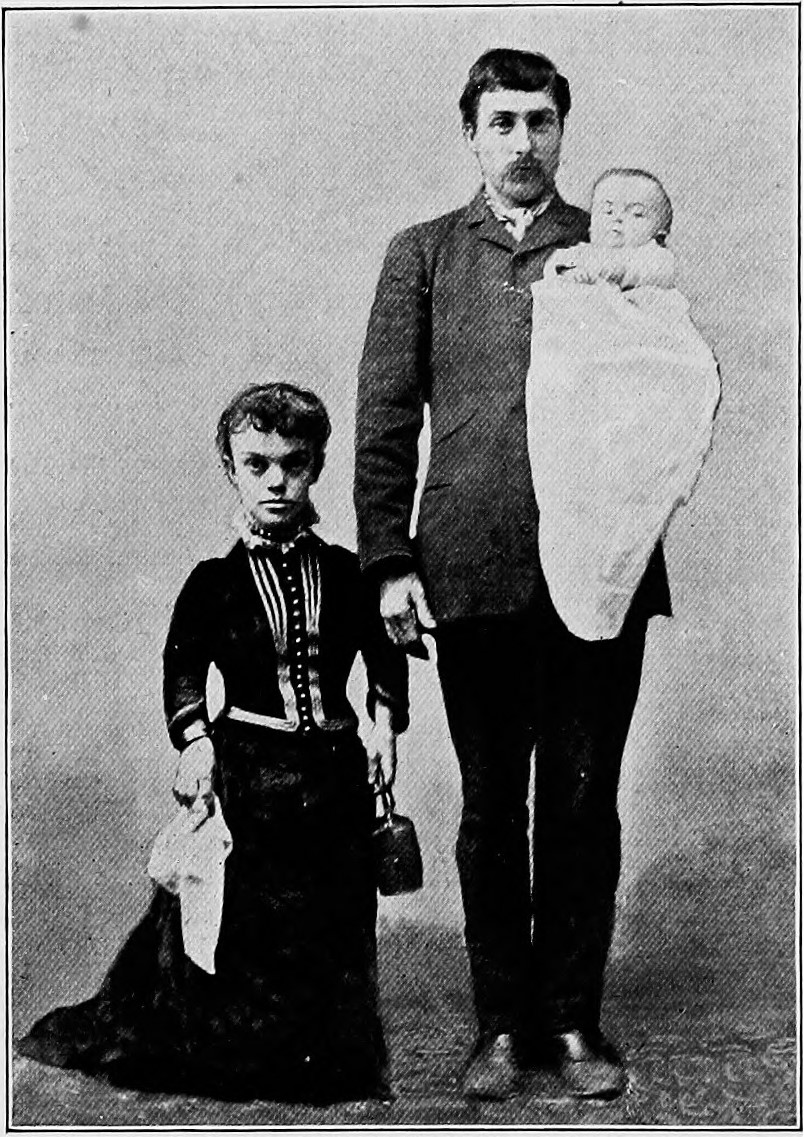
Mother and child with achondroplasia with unaffected father, showing inheritance

Achondroplasia is caused by a mutation in fibroblast growth factor receptor 3 (FGFR3) gene. This gene encodes a protein called fibroblast growth factor receptor 3, which contributes to the production of collagen and other structural components in tissues and bones. When the FGFR3 gene is mutated it interferes with how this protein interacts with growth factors leading to complications with bone production. Cartilage is not able to fully develop into bone, causing the individual to be disproportionately shorter in height.

In normal development, FGFR3 has a negative regulatory effect on bone growth. In achondroplasia, the mutated form of the receptor is constitutively active, and this leads to severely shortened bones. This is an example of a gain of function mutation. The effect is genetically dominant, with one variant of the FGFR3 gene being sufficient to cause achondroplasia, while two copies of the mutant gene are invariably fatal (recessive lethal) before or shortly after birth. This occurs due to respiratory failure from an underdeveloped ribcage. People with achondroplasia are often born to parents that do not have the condition due to spontaneous mutation.

Where achondroplasia is inherited, its pattern is autosomal dominant. In couples where one partner has achondroplasia there is a 50% chance of passing the disorder on to their child every pregnancy. In situations where both parents have achondroplasia there is a 50% chance the child will have achondroplasia, 25% chance the child will not, and a 25% chance that the child will inherit the gene from both parents resulting in double dominance and leading to lethal bone dysplasia.

Studies have demonstrated that new gene mutations for achondroplasia are exclusively inherited from the father and occur during spermatogenesis; it has been theorized that sperm carrying the mutation in FGFR3 have a selective advantage over sperm with normal FGFR3. The frequency of mutations in sperm leading to achondroplasia increases in proportion to paternal age, as well as in proportion to exposure to ionizing radiation. The occurrence rate of achondroplasia in the children of fathers over 50 years of age is 1 in 1,875, compared to 1 in 15,000 in the general population. Research by urologist Harry Fisch of the Male Reproductive Center at Columbia Presbyterian Hospital in 2013 indicated that in humans this defect may be exclusively inherited from the father and becomes increasingly probable with paternal age, specifically males reproducing after 35.

There are two other syndromes with a genetic basis similar to achondroplasia: hypochondroplasia and thanatophoric dysplasia.

== Diagnosis ==
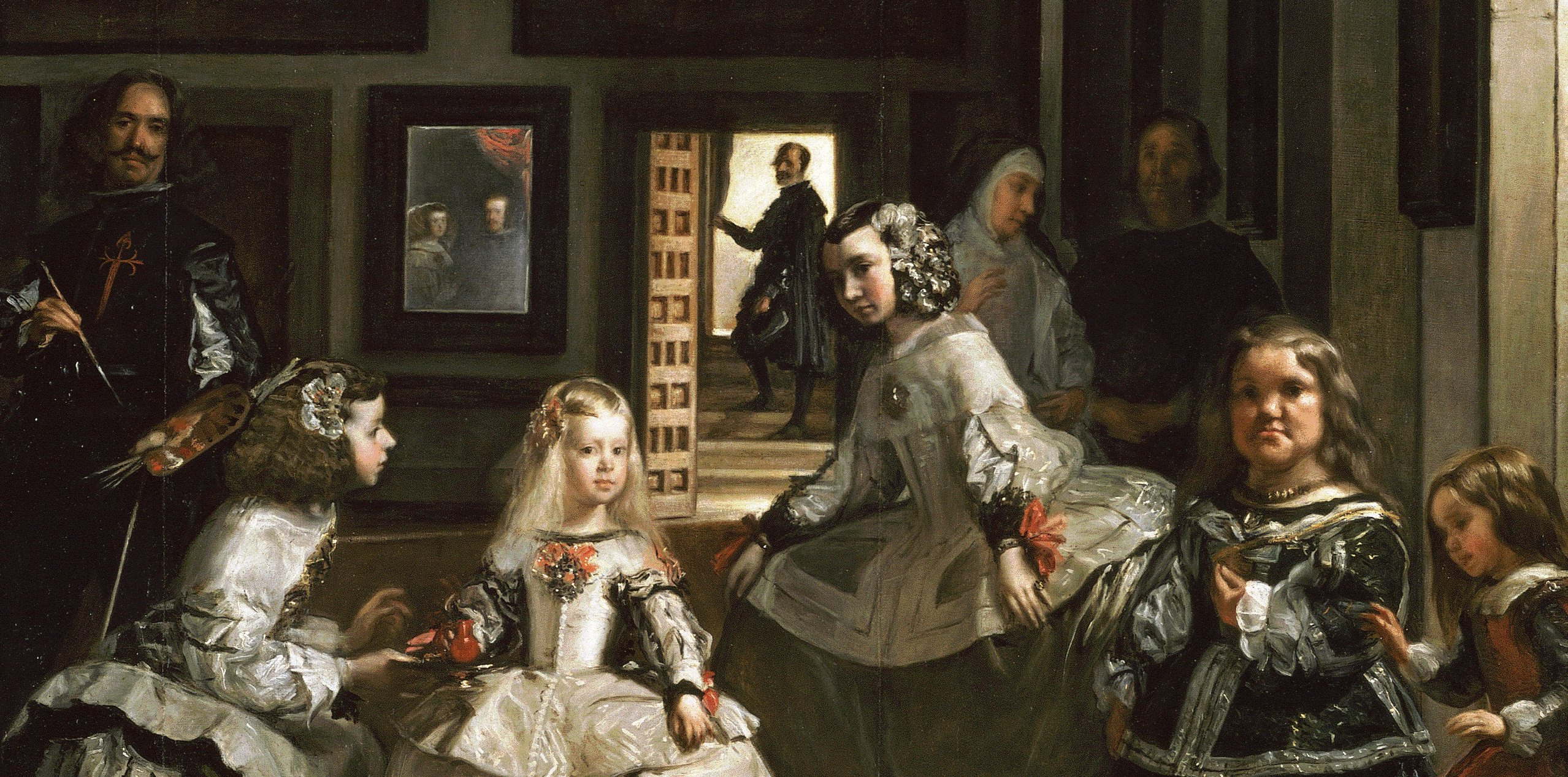
Detail of Las Meninas by Diego Velázquez (1656), showing Maribarbola and Nicolasito Pertusato (right), achondroplastic dwarfs in the entourage of Infanta Margarita

Achondroplasia can be detected before birth by prenatal ultrasound, although signs are often subtle and not apparent before the 24th week of pregnancy. A DNA test can be performed before birth to detect homozygosity, wherein two copies of the mutant gene are inherited, a lethal condition leading to stillbirths. Postnatal diagnosis of achondroplasia is typically uncomplicated, involving an assessment of physical and radiographic features. Clinical features include megalocephaly, short limbs, prominent forehead, thoracolumbar kyphosis and mid-face hypoplasia. Complications like dental malocclusion, hydrocephalus and repeated otitis media can be observed. The risk of death in infancy is increased due to the likelihood of compression of the spinal cord with or without upper airway obstruction.

=== Radiologic findings ===
A skeletal survey is useful to confirm the diagnosis of achondroplasia. The skull is large, with a narrow foramen magnum, and relatively small skull base. The vertebral bodies are short and flattened with relatively large intervertebral disk height, and there is congenitally narrowed spinal canal. The iliac wings are small and squared, with a narrow sciatic notch and horizontal acetabular roof. The tubular bones are short and thick with metaphyseal cupping and flaring and irregular growth plates. Fibular overgrowth is present. The hand is broad with short metacarpals and phalanges, and a trident configuration. The ribs are short with cupped anterior ends. If the radiographic features are not classic, a search for a different diagnosis should be entertained. Because of the extremely deformed bone structure, people with achondroplasia are often "double jointed". The diagnosis can be made by fetal ultrasound by progressive discordance between the short femur length and biparietal diameter by age. The trident hand configuration can be seen if the fingers are fully extended.

Another common characteristic of the syndrome is thoracolumbar gibbus in infancy.

== Treatment ==
There is no known cure for achondroplasia even though the cause of the mutation in the growth factor receptor has been found. Although used by those without achondroplasia to aid in growth, human growth hormone does not help people with achondroplasia, which involves a different hormonal pathway. Usually, the best results appear within the first and second year of therapy. After the second year of growth hormone therapy, beneficial bone growth decreases, so the therapy is not a satisfactory long-term treatment. As of December 2020, the treatment of achondroplasia with human growth hormone was approved only in Japan.

A small-molecule drug vosoritide is used to improve growth velocity in children with achondroplasia,. Treatment with vosoritide has shown improved spinal sagittal balance, decreased leg bowing [Savarirayan et al 2025b]., and improvement in physical aspects of health-related quality of life after three years. Final adult height after treatment with vosoritide is still to be determined. Vosoritide inhibits the activity of FGFR3. It has been gradually made available in different countries starting from 2021.

Limb-lengthening will increase the length of the legs and arms of someone with achondroplasia, but little medical consensus exists regarding this practice. The age of surgery can vary from early childhood to adulthood.

Research has also shown that introducing parents of children with achondroplasia to support and advocacy groups at the time of diagnosis can improve outcomes. Several patient advocacy groups exist to support people with achondroplasia and their families. Resources are available to support patients and their caregivers with information that they can distribute to their physicians, who may not be familiar with the unique medical requirements of managing achondroplasia. Physician-oriented best practice guidelines are also available to guide physicians managing the spinal disorders, foramen magnum stenosis, craniofacial implications, pregnancy, and peri-operative needs of people with achondroplasia.

Navepegritide (Yuviwel) was approved for medical use in the United States in March 2026.

== Epidemiology ==
Achondroplasia is one of several congenital conditions with similar presentations, such as osteogenesis imperfecta, multiple epiphyseal dysplasia tarda, achondrogenesis, osteopetrosis, and thanatophoric dysplasia. This makes estimates of prevalence difficult, with changing and subjective diagnostic criteria over time. One detailed and long-running study in the Netherlands found that the prevalence determined at birth was only 1.3 per 100,000 live births. Another study at the same time found a rate of 1 per 10,000. A 2020 review and meta-analysis estimated a worldwide prevalence of 4.6 per 100,000.

== Psychological and social aspects ==
In addition to physical challenges, individuals with achondroplasia may also experience psychological challenges such as fear or negative perception of individuals with achondroplasia. Gollust et al. have indicated that adults with achondroplasia tend to have lower self-esteem, annual income, educational attainment, and overall quality of life (QOL) when compared to their unaffected siblings. Interestingly, the Golust study revealed that the subjects were as likely to cite disadvantages relating to social barriers as those relating to health issues and functioning.

On the other hand, other investigators, such as Ancona, state that for many individuals in immediate environments that have natural acceptance of the condition from the beginning, their main challenge lies in adapting to a world designed for those without the condition. However, when society rejects the condition from the start and associates it with destructive anxiety, it significantly damages the individual's self-image and leads to their social exclusion. Thus, the author hypothesizes, an accepting environment is crucial to prevent significant suffering for individuals with achondroplasia and to ensure the best outcomes for corrective interventions, rather than perpetuating rejection.

Similarly, a study conducted in Japan by Nishimura and Hanaki found that children with achondroplasia faced challenges related to their short stature, but there was no indication of psychosocial maladjustment. They hypothesized that focusing on coping strategies and self-efficacy may play a crucial role in promoting psychological well-being among children with achondroplasia.

Social support and peer connections can be important for individuals with achondroplasia. Support groups, online communities, and advocacy organizations can provide a sense of belonging and can help individuals with achondroplasia connect with others who understand their experiences. Additionally, these communities can serve as a resource for information and support for both individuals with achondroplasia and their families. In the United States, The Little People of America (LPA) is a national organization that provides support, resources, and advocacy for individuals with dwarfism, including achondroplasia.

== Animals ==
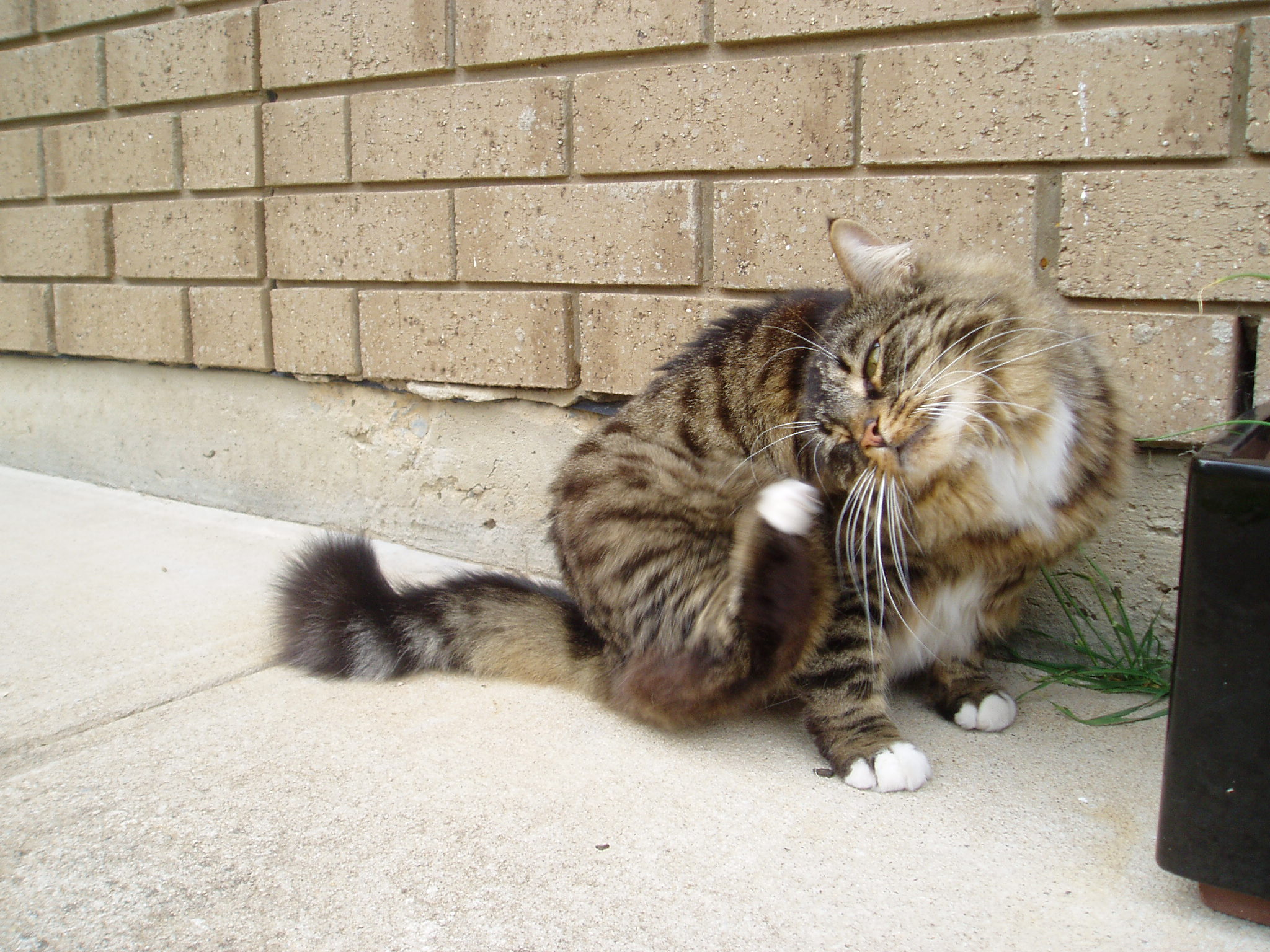
Munchkin dwarf cat

Based on their disproportionate dwarfism, some dog breeds traditionally have been classified as "achondroplastic". This is the case for the dachshund, Basset Hound, Welsh Corgi and bulldog breeds. Data from whole genome association studies in short-limbed dogs reveal a strong association of this trait with a retro-gene coding for fibroblast growth factor 4 (FGF4). Therefore, it seems unlikely that dogs and humans are achondroplastic for the same reasons. However, histological studies in some achondroplastic dog breeds have shown altered cell patterns in cartilage that are very similar to those observed in humans exhibiting achondroplasia.

A similar form of achondroplasia was found in a litter of piglets from a phenotypically normal Danish sow. The dwarfism was inherited dominant in the offspring from this litter. The piglets were born phenotypically normal but became more and more symptomatic as they reached maturity. This involved a mutation of the protein collagen, type X, alpha 1, encoded by the COL10A1 gene. In humans a mutation (G595E) to the COL10A1 gene has been associated with Schmid metaphyseal chondrodysplasia (SMCD), a relatively mild skeletal disorder.

The now extinct Ancon sheep was created by humans through the selective breeding of common domestic sheep with achondroplasia. The average-sized torso combined with the relatively smaller legs produced by achondroplasia was valued for making affected sheep less likely to escape without affecting the amount of wool or meat each sheep produced.

== Famous people with achondroplasia ==
- Ucok Baba - Indonesian actor, presenter, comedian and singer
- Josh Ryan Evans - American actor
- David Rappaport - English actor
- Jason Acuña - American stunt performer
- Mimie Mathy - French actress, comedian, and singer
- Eric Cullen - Scottish actor
- Peter Dinklage - American actor
- Mike Edmonds - English actor
- Ellie Simmonds - British Paralympic swimmer
- Kate Wilson - Australian Paralympic swimmer
- Rico Abreu - American racing driver
- Kyron Duke - Welsh powerlifter and Paralympic track and field athlete
- Sarah Bowen - Australian Paralympic swimmer
- Claire Keefer - Bronze medalist in the 2016 Rio Paralympics
- Brad Williams - American comedian and actor
- Alan Eggleston - Australian politician
- Michael Ain - American orthopedic surgeon

== See also ==
- List of radiographic findings associated with cutaneous conditions
