= Fibroblast growth factor receptor 3 =

Gene involved in the most common form of dwarfism

FGFR3

Identifiers
- Aliases: FGFR3, ACH, CD333, CEK2, HSFGFR3EX, JTK4, fibroblast growth factor receptor 3
- External IDs: OMIM: 134934; MGI: 95524; GeneCards: FGFR3
Available structures
PDB	Ortholog search: PDBe RCSB
PDB	List of PDB id codes 1RY7, 2LZL, 4K33
Enzyme activity
EC #	BRENDA	ExPASy	KEGG	MetaCyc
2.7.10.1	↗	↗	↗	↗

Gene location (Human)
Chr.	Chromosome 4 (human)
Band	4p16.3	Start	1,793,293 bp
Band	4p16.3	End	1,808,872 bp

Gene location (Mouse)
Chr.	Chromosome 5 (mouse)
Band	5 B2|5 17.83 cM	Start	33,879,018 bp
Band	5 B2|5 17.83 cM	End	33,894,412 bp
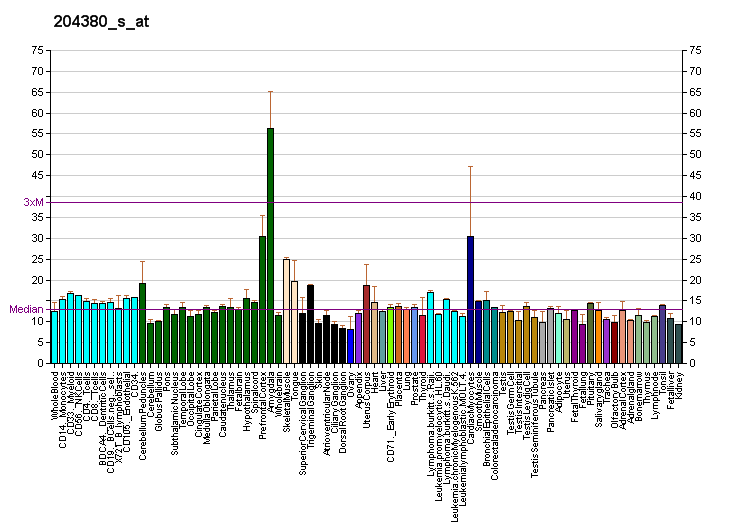

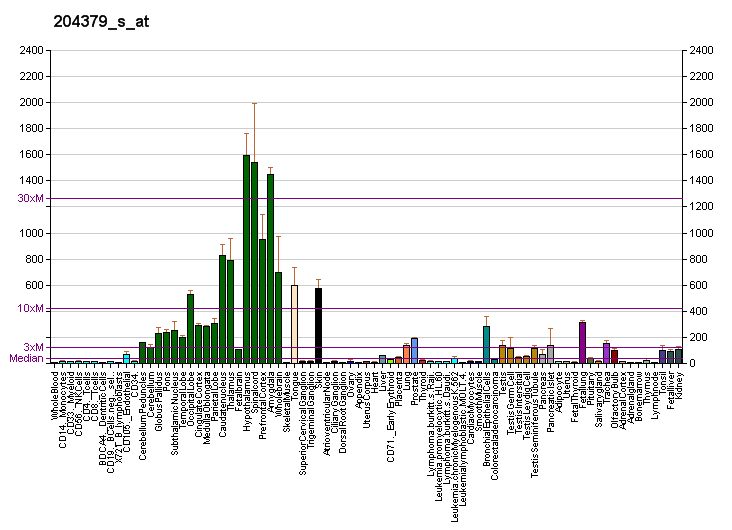
RNA expression pattern
Bgee	Human / Mouse (ortholog); Top expressed in: skin of thigh; skin of hip; skin of arm; gingival epithelium; tibia; external globus pallidus; dorsal motor nucleus of vagus nerve; internal globus pallidus; optic nerve; skin of abdomen / Top expressed in: ventricular zone; skin of external ear; deep cerebellar nuclei; dorsal tegmental nucleus; lens; lumbar subsegment of spinal cord; medial vestibular nucleus; ventral tegmental area; hair follicle; mammillary body; More reference expression data
BioGPS	More reference expression data
Gene ontology
Molecular function	transferase activity; nucleotide binding; protein kinase activity; kinase activity; protein binding; transmembrane receptor protein tyrosine kinase activity; fibroblast growth factor binding; fibroblast growth factor-activated receptor activity; ATP binding; protein tyrosine kinase activity; phosphatidylinositol-4,5-bisphosphate 3-kinase activity; 1-phosphatidylinositol-3-kinase activity; identical protein binding; receptor tyrosine kinase; transmembrane signaling receptor activity
Cellular component	cytoplasm; integral component of membrane; Golgi apparatus; membrane; focal adhesion; plasma membrane; integral component of plasma membrane; transport vesicle; extracellular region; cell surface; endoplasmic reticulum; cytoplasmic vesicle; nucleus; receptor complex
Biological process	bone mineralization; chondrocyte differentiation; phosphorylation; negative regulation of developmental growth; cell-cell signaling; bone morphogenesis; endochondral ossification; bone maturation; fibroblast growth factor receptor apoptotic signaling pathway; MAPK cascade; positive regulation of phosphatidylinositol 3-kinase activity; positive regulation of phospholipase activity; fibroblast growth factor receptor signaling pathway; protein phosphorylation; chondrocyte proliferation; positive regulation of cell population proliferation; positive regulation of ERK1 and ERK2 cascade; protein autophosphorylation; peptidyl-tyrosine phosphorylation; endochondral bone growth; positive regulation of MAPK cascade; apoptotic process; phosphatidylinositol phosphate biosynthetic process; phosphatidylinositol-3-phosphate biosynthetic process; positive regulation of tyrosine phosphorylation of STAT protein; skeletal system development; positive regulation of protein kinase B signaling; negative regulation of signal transduction; cell differentiation; negative regulation of apoptotic process; transmembrane receptor protein tyrosine kinase signaling pathway
Sources:Amigo / QuickGO
Orthologs
Databases	NCBI: entry; OMA: entry
Species	Human	Mouse
Entrez	2261	14184
Ensembl	ENSG00000068078	ENSMUSG00000054252
UniProt	P22607	Q61851
RefSeq (mRNA)	NM_000142; NM_001163213; NM_022965; NM_001354809; NM_001354810	NM_001163215; NM_001163216; NM_001163217; NM_001205270; NM_008010 NM_001359036; NM_001359037
RefSeq (protein)	NP_000133; NP_001156685; NP_075254; NP_001341738; NP_001341739	n/a
Location (UCSC)	Chr 4: 1.79 – 1.81 Mb	Chr 5: 33.88 – 33.89 Mb
PubMed search
- Wikidata
View/Edit Human	View/Edit Mouse

Fibroblast growth factor receptor 3 (FGFR-3) is a protein that in humans is encoded by the FGFR3 gene. FGFR3 has also been designated as CD333 (cluster of differentiation 333). The gene, which is located on chromosome 4, location p16.3, is expressed in tissues such as the cartilage, brain, intestine, and kidneys.

The FGFR3 gene produces various forms of the FGFR-3 protein; the location varies depending on the isoform of FGFR-3. Since the different forms are found within different tissues the protein is responsible for multiple growth factor interactions. Gain of function mutations in FGFR3 inhibits chondrocyte proliferation and underlies achondroplasia and hypochondroplasia.

== Function ==
FGFR-3 is a member of the fibroblast growth factor receptor family, where amino acid sequence is highly conserved between members and throughout evolution. FGFR family members differ from one another in their ligand affinities and tissue distribution. A full-length representative protein would consist of an extracellular region, composed of three immunoglobulin-like domains, a single hydrophobic membrane-spanning segment and a cytoplasmic tyrosine kinase domain. The extracellular portion of the protein interacts with fibroblast growth factors, setting in motion a cascade of downstream signals which ultimately influence cell mitogenesis and differentiation.

This particular family member binds both acidic and basic fibroblast growth factor and plays a role in bone development and maintenance. The FGFR-3 protein plays a role in bone growth by regulating ossification. Alternative splicing occurs and additional variants have been described, including those utilizing alternate exon 8 rather than 9, but their full-length nature has not been determined.

== Mutations ==
Simplification on the mutation 46 XX 4q16.3 (female), 46XY 4q16.3 (male). Gain of function mutations in this gene can develop dysfunctional proteins "impede cartilage growth and development and affect chondrocyte proliferation and calcification" which can lead to craniosynostosis and multiple types of skeletal dysplasia (osteochondrodysplasia).

In achondroplasia, the FGFR3 gene has a missense mutation at nucleotide 1138 resulting from either a G>A or G>C. This point mutation in the FGFR3 gene causes hydrogen bonds to form between two arginine side chains leading to ligand-independent stabilization of FGFR3 dimers. Overactivity of FGFR3 inhibits chondrocyte proliferation and restricts long bone length.

FGFR3 mutations are also linked with spermatocytic tumor, which occur more frequently in older men.

== Disease linkage ==
Defects in the FGFR3 gene has been associated with several conditions, including craniosynostosis and seborrheic keratosis.

=== Bladder cancer ===
Mutations of FGFR3, FGFR3–TACC3 and FGFR3–BAIAP2L1 fusion proteins are frequently associated with bladder cancer, while some FGFR3 mutations are also associated with a better prognosis. Hence FGFR3 represents a potential therapeutic target for the treatment of bladder cancer.

Post-translational modification of FGFR3 occur in bladder cancer that do not occur in normal cells and can be targeted by immunotherapeutic antibodies.

=== Glioblastoma ===
FGFR3-TACC3 fusions have been identified as the primary mitogenic drivers in a subset of glioblastomas (approximately 4%) and other gliomas and may be associated with slightly improved overall survival. The FGFR3-TACC3 fusion represents a possible therapeutic target in glioblastoma.

=== Achondroplasia ===
Achondroplasia is a dominant genetic disorder caused by mutations in FGFR3 that make the resulting protein overactive. Individuals with these mutation have a head size that is larger than normal and are significantly shorter in height. Only a single copy of the mutated FGFR3 gene results in achondroplasia. It is generally caused by spontaneous mutations in germ cells; roughly 80 percent of the time, parents with children that have this disorder are normal size.

=== Thanatophoric dysplasia ===
Thanatophoric dysplasia is a genetic disorder caused by mutations in FGFR3 that is often fatal. There are two types. TD type I is caused by a premature stop codon mutation. TD type II is a result of the Lys650Glu missense mutation which is located in the tyrosine kinase region of FGFR3.

=== Muenke syndrome ===
Muenke syndrome, a disorder characterized by craniosynostosis, is caused by protein changes on FGFR3. The specific pathogenic variant c.749C>G changes the protein p.Pro250Arg, in turn resulting in this condition. Characteristics of Muenke syndrome include coronal synostosis (usually bilateral), midfacial retrusion, strabismus, hearing loss, and developmental delay. Turribrachycephaly, cloverleaf skull, and frontal bossing are also possible.

== As a drug target ==
An FGFR3 inhibitor known as erdafitinib has been approved as a cancer treatment in several jurisdictions for FGFR3+ urothelial carcinoma.

Additional FGFR3 inhibitors that have reached clinical testing include:

Drug	Disease / clinical setting	Qualifying FGFR3 alteration	Highest relevant clinical stage
Erdafitinib	Locally advanced or metastatic urothelial carcinoma	Susceptible activating FGFR3 mutations; FGFR2/3 rearrangements or fusions	Phase III; approved
"	Non-muscle-invasive bladder cancer	Activating FGFR3 mutation or FGFR3 fusion/rearrangement	Phase II
"	Recurrent diffuse glioma / glioblastoma	FGFR3–TACC3 fusion and other eligible FGFR–TACC fusions	Phase II
"	Advanced solid tumours, tumour-agnostic basket setting	Activating FGFR3 mutation or FGFR3 fusion/rearrangement	Phase II
Infigratinib	Achondroplasia	Germline activating FGFR3 variants, predominantly p.Gly380Arg	Phase II
"	Hypochondroplasia	Germline activating FGFR3 variants, commonly p.Asn540Lys	Phase II/III
"	Muscle-invasive urothelial carcinoma, adjuvant setting	FGFR3 alteration	Phase III
Fexagratinib	Recurrent high-grade diffuse glioma / glioblastoma	FGFR3–TACC3 fusion or eligible FGFR fusion	Phase I/II
Vepugratinib	Untreated unresectable locally advanced or metastatic urothelial carcinoma	A qualifying FGFR3 genetic alteration, including mutation or fusion	Phase III
Dabogratinib	Achondroplasia	Germline activating FGFR3 variant; BEACH301 enrols children with molecularly confirmed p.Gly380Arg	Phase II
"	Low-grade, intermediate-risk non-muscle-invasive bladder cancer	FGFR3-altered tumour	Phase II
"	Low-grade upper-tract urothelial carcinoma	Predominantly FGFR3-driven tumours; patient-specific trial eligibility should be verified from the protocol	Phase IIa/b
"	Advanced/metastatic urothelial cancer and other FGFR3-altered solid tumours	Activating FGFR3 mutation or fusion/rearrangement, including resistance-associated gatekeeper mutations	Phase I/II

== Interactions ==
Fibroblast growth factor receptor 3 has been shown to interact with FGF8 and FGF9.

== See also ==
- Cluster of differentiation
- Fibroblast growth factor receptor
