= Octave Crouzon =

French neurologist (1874–1938)

Louis Édouard Octave Crouzon (1874–1938) was a French neurologist born in Paris.

He received his doctorate from the University of Paris, where he studied under Paul Georges Dieulafoy (1839–1911), Joseph Babinski (1857–1932) and Pierre Marie (1853–1940). During his medical career, he was associated with the Hôtel-Dieu de Paris and Salpêtrière Hospital.

Crouzon specialized in hereditary neurological diseases, especially spinocerebellar ataxia. He did extensive work associated with cervical and lumbar spine deformities, and conducted studies of chronic rheumatic and arthritic disorders. Crouzon was the first to describe a condition he called "craniofacial dysostosis", defined as a genetic branchial arch disorder that results in abnormal facial features. Today this condition is known as Crouzon's syndrome.

For his entire career, Crouzon was interested in psychology, particularly in the work of Pierre Janet (1859-1947), whom Crouzon considered a major influence.

During his career, he was president of the Société Neurologique de Paris (Neurological Society of Paris) and secretary of the journal Revue Neurologique.

== Partial bibliography ==
- Dysostose cranio-faciale héréditaire. Bulletin de la Société des Médecins des Hôpitaux de Paris, (1912).
- Une nouvelle famille atteinte de dysostose cranio-faciale héréditaire. Archives de médecine des enfants, Paris, (1915).
