= Metaphyseal chondrodysplasia Schmid type =

Schmid metaphyseal chondrodysplasia
- Other names: MCDS
- This condition is inherited in an autosomal dominant manner.
- Specialty: Orthopedic

Metaphyseal chondrodysplasia Schmid type is a type of chondrodysplasia associated with a deficiency of collagen, type X, alpha 1.

Unlike other "rickets syndromes", affected individuals have normal serum calcium, phosphorus, and urinary amino acid levels. Long bones are short and curved, with widened growth plates and metaphyses.

It is named for the German researcher F. Schmid, who characterized it in 1949.
