= BAIAP2L1 =

Protein-coding gene in the species Homo sapiens

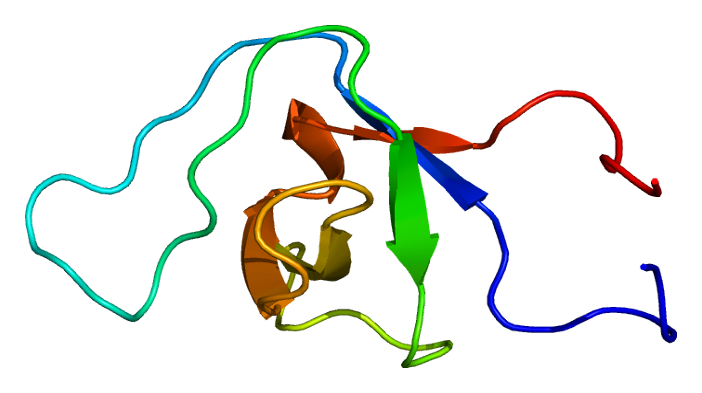

Identifiers
- Aliases: BAIAP2L1, IRTKS, BAI1 associated protein 2 like 1, BAR/IMD domain containing adaptor protein 2 like 1
- External IDs: OMIM: 611877; MGI: 1914148; GeneCards: BAIAP2L1
Available structures
PDB	Ortholog search: PDBe RCSB
PDB	List of PDB id codes 2KXC, 2LNH

Gene location (Human)
Chr.	Chromosome 7 (human)
Band	7q21.3-q22.1	Start	98,291,650 bp
Band	7q21.3-q22.1	End	98,401,090 bp

Gene location (Mouse)
Chr.	Chromosome 5 (mouse)
Band	5|5 G2	Start	144,201,336 bp
Band	5|5 G2	End	144,294,922 bp
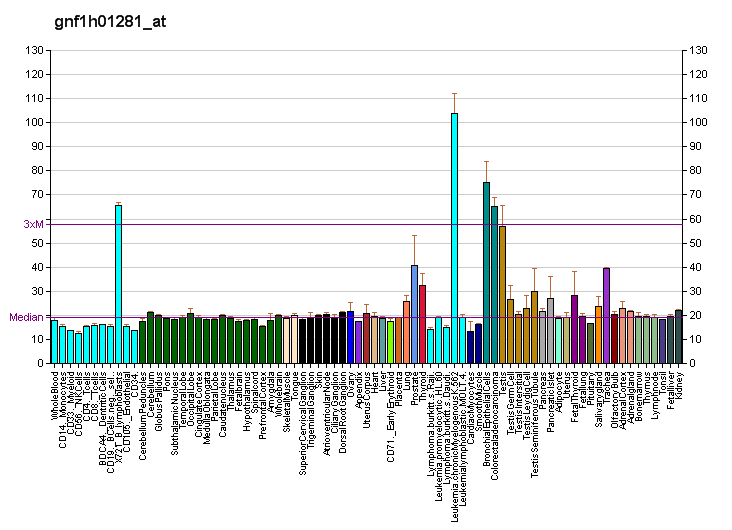

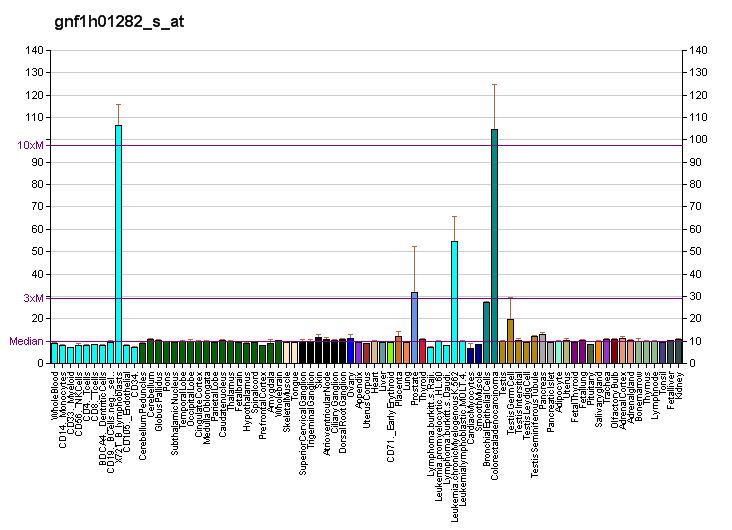
RNA expression pattern
Bgee	Human / Mouse (ortholog); Top expressed in: pancreatic ductal cell; secondary oocyte; tendon of biceps brachii; amniotic fluid; cartilage tissue; bronchial epithelial cell; duodenum; mucosa of ileum; mucosa of transverse colon; olfactory zone of nasal mucosa / Top expressed in: secondary oocyte; primary oocyte; zygote; right lung lobe; left colon; lumbar spinal ganglion; epithelium of stomach; pyloric antrum; mucous cell of stomach; otic placode; More reference expression data
BioGPS	More reference expression data
Gene ontology
Molecular function	actin binding; proline-rich region binding; protein binding; cadherin binding involved in cell-cell adhesion
Cellular component	cytosol; plasma membrane; extracellular exosome; cytoskeleton; nucleoplasm; actin cytoskeleton; cytoplasm
Biological process	insulin receptor signaling pathway; regulation of actin filament polymerization; plasma membrane organization; positive regulation of actin cytoskeleton reorganization; positive regulation of actin filament polymerization; response to bacterium; regulation of insulin receptor signaling pathway; actin filament bundle assembly; actin crosslink formation; cell-cell adhesion
Sources:Amigo / QuickGO
Orthologs
Databases	NCBI: entry; OMA: entry
Species	Human	Mouse
Entrez	55971	66898
Ensembl	ENSG00000006453	ENSMUSG00000038859
UniProt	Q9UHR4	Q9DBJ3
RefSeq (mRNA)	NM_018842	NM_025833
RefSeq (protein)	NP_061330	NP_080109
Location (UCSC)	Chr 7: 98.29 – 98.4 Mb	Chr 5: 144.2 – 144.29 Mb
PubMed search
- Wikidata
View/Edit Human	View/Edit Mouse

Brain-specific angiogenesis inhibitor 1-associated protein 2-like protein 1 is a protein that in humans is encoded by the BAIAP2L1 gene.
