= Fexagratinib =

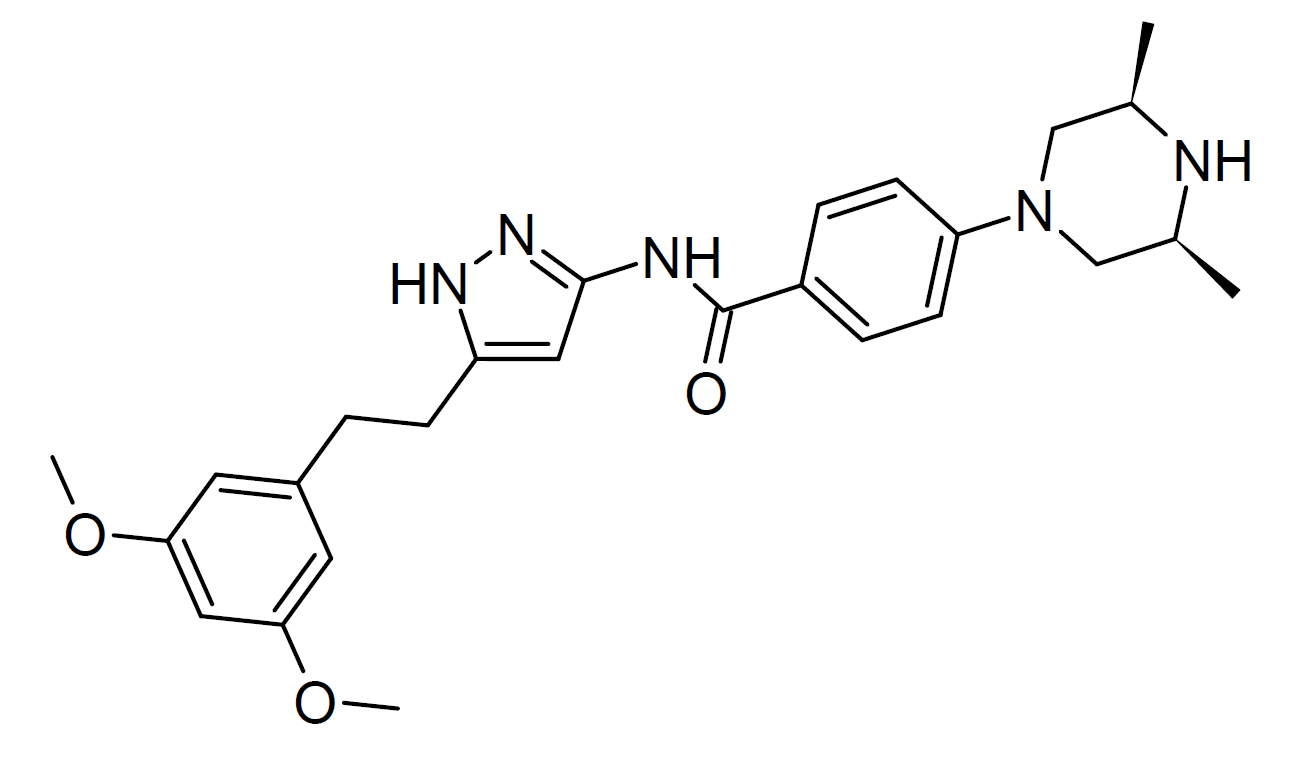

Identifiers
- IUPAC name: N-[5-[2-(3,5-dimethoxyphenyl)ethyl]-1H-pyrazol-3-yl]-4-[(3R,5S)-3,5-dimethylpiperazin-1-yl]benzamide
- CAS Number: 1035270-39-3
- PubChem CID: 51039095
- IUPHAR/BPS: 7707
- DrugBank: DB12247
- ChemSpider: 26333104
- UNII: 2167OG1EKJ
- ChEBI: CHEBI:63453
- ChEMBL: ChEMBL3348846
- PDB ligand: 66T (PDBe, RCSB PDB)
- CompTox Dashboard (EPA): DTXSID80145887
- ECHA InfoCard: 100.206.232

Chemical and physical data
- Formula: C_{26}H_{33}N_{5}O_{3}
- Molar mass: 463.582 g·mol^{−1}
- 3D model (JSmol): Interactive image
- SMILES: C[C@@H]1CN(C[C@@H](N1)C)C2=CC=C(C=C2)C(=O)NC3=NNC(=C3)CCC4=CC(=CC(=C4)OC)OC
- InChI: InChI=1S/C26H33N5O3/c1-17-15-31(16-18(2)27-17)22-9-6-20(7-10-22)26(32)28-25-13-21(29-30-25)8-5-19-11-23(33-3)14-24(12-19)34-4/h6-7,9-14,17-18,27H,5,8,15-16H2,1-4H3,(H2,28,29,30,32)/t17-,18+; Key:VRQMAABPASPXMW-HDICACEKSA-N

Fexagratinib (AZD4547) is an experimental drug which acts as an inhibitor of the fibroblast growth factor receptors, having high affinity for FGFR1, FGFR2 and FGFR3 and weaker activity at FGFR4. It has reached clinical trials in humans against several forms of cancer, but has had only limited use as a medicine due to an unfavorable side effect profile, though it may have some applications in combination with other drugs. However it is still widely used in cancer research.
