= COQ7 =

Protein-coding gene in humans

Identifiers
- Aliases: COQ7, CAT5, CLK-1, CLK1, COQ10D8, coenzyme Q7, hydroxylase
- External IDs: OMIM: 601683; MGI: 107207; HomoloGene: 6953; GeneCards: COQ7; OMA:COQ7 - orthologs

Gene location (Human)
Chr.	Chromosome 16 (human)
Band	16p12.3	Start	19,067,614 bp
Band	16p12.3	End	19,080,095 bp

Gene location (Mouse)
Chr.	Chromosome 7 (mouse)
Band	7 F1|7 63.44 cM	Start	118,108,882 bp
Band	7 F1|7 63.44 cM	End	118,132,579 bp
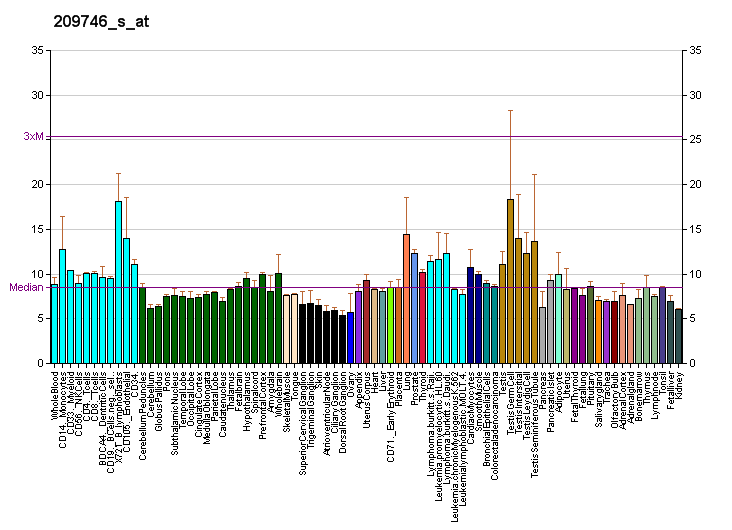

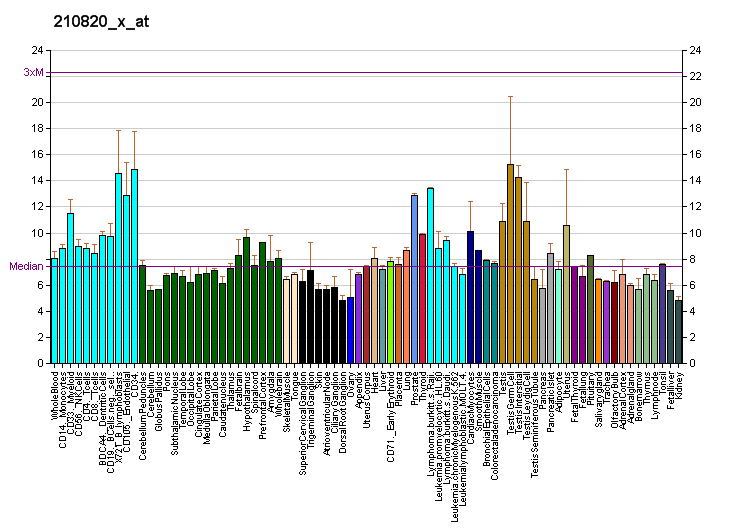

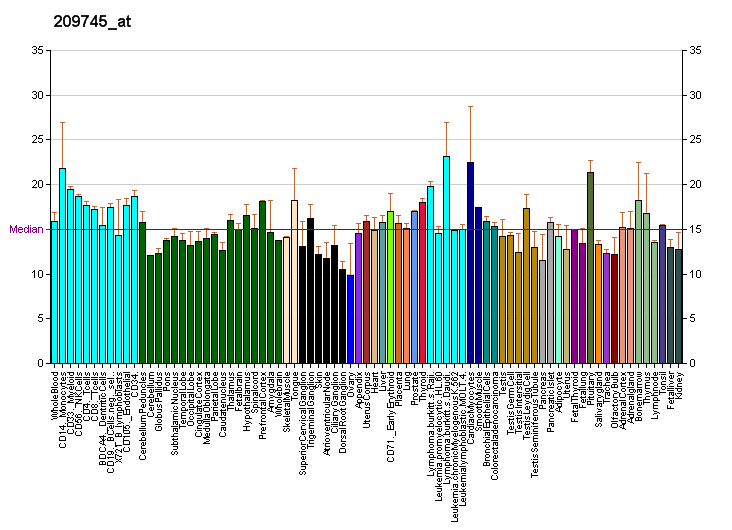
RNA expression pattern
Bgee	Human / Mouse (ortholog); Top expressed in: gonad; muscle of thigh; gastrocnemius muscle; Achilles tendon; testicle; olfactory zone of nasal mucosa; ventricular zone; right testis; left testis; left ovary / Top expressed in: facial motor nucleus; right ventricle; digastric muscle; sternocleidomastoid muscle; temporal muscle; soleus muscle; myocardium of ventricle; right kidney; endocardial cushion; renal corpuscle; More reference expression data
BioGPS	More reference expression data
Gene ontology
Molecular function	oxidoreductase activity; chromatin binding; protein binding; metal ion binding; monooxygenase activity; oxidoreductase activity, acting on paired donors, with incorporation or reduction of molecular oxygen, NAD(P)H as one donor, and incorporation of one atom of oxygen; 2-octoprenyl-3-methyl-6-methoxy-1,4-benzoquinone hydroxylase activity
Cellular component	mitochondrial inner membrane; mitochondrion; nucleus; membrane; extrinsic component of mitochondrial inner membrane
Biological process	negative regulation of transcription by RNA polymerase II; regulation of reactive oxygen species metabolic process; positive regulation of transcription by RNA polymerase II; ubiquinone biosynthetic process; mitochondrial ATP synthesis coupled electron transport; determination of adult lifespan; regulation of gene expression
Sources:Amigo / QuickGO
Orthologs
Species	Human	Mouse
Entrez	10229	12850
Ensembl	ENSG00000167186	ENSMUSG00000030652
UniProt	Q99807	P97478
RefSeq (mRNA)	NM_001190983; NM_016138	NM_009940; NM_001304758
RefSeq (protein)	NP_001177912; NP_057222; NP_001357418; NP_001357419; NP_001357420 NP_001357421; NP_001357422; NP_001357423; NP_001357424	NP_001291687; NP_034070
Location (UCSC)	Chr 16: 19.07 – 19.08 Mb	Chr 7: 118.11 – 118.13 Mb
PubMed search
- Wikidata
View/Edit Human	View/Edit Mouse

Mitochondrial 5-demethoxyubiquinone hydroxylase (DMQ hydroxylase), also known as coenzyme Q7, hydroxylase, is an enzyme that in humans is encoded by the COQ7 gene. The clk-1 (clock-1) gene encodes this protein that is necessary for ubiquinone biosynthesis in the worm Caenorhabditis elegans and other eukaryotes. The mouse version of the gene is called mclk-1 and the human, fruit fly and yeast homolog COQ7 (coenzyme Q biosynthesis protein 7).

CLK-1 is not to be confused with the unrelated human protein CLK1 which plays a role in RNA splicing.

== Structure ==
The protein has two repeats of approximately 90 amino acids, that contain two conserved motifs predicted to be important for coordination of iron. The structure and function of the gene are highly conserved among different species.

The C. elegans protein contains 187 amino acid residues (20 kilodaltons), the human homolog 217 amino acid residues (24 kilodaltons, gene consisting of six exons spanning 11 kb and located on chromosome 16).

== Mitochondrial function ==
Ubiquinone is a small redox active lipid that is found in most cellular membranes where it acts as a cofactor in numerous cellular redox processes, including mitochondrial electron transport. As a cofactor, ubiquinone is often involved in processes that produce reactive oxygen species (ROS). In addition, ubiquinone is one of the main endogenous antioxidants of the cell. The CLK-1 enzyme is responsible for the hydroxylation of 5-demethoxyubiquinone to 5-hydroxyubiquinone.

It has been shown that mutations in the gene are associated with increased lifespan. Defects of the gene slow down a variety of developmental and physiological processes, including the cell cycle, embryogenesis, post-embryonic growth, rhythmic behaviors and aging.

== Nuclear function ==
CLK-1 and COQ7 predominantly localise to mitochondria to participate in the ubiquinone biosynthetic pathway which is found there. However, a small pool of CLK-1 and COQ7 translocates to the nucleus in response to the production of ROS by normally functioning mitochondria in both worms and human cells, respectively. Translocation of CLK-1 and COQ7 represents a mitochondrial to nuclear retrograde signalling pathway that acts to suppress mitochondrial stress responses. The mitochondrial and nuclear pools of CLK-1 are thought to contribute independently to worm lifespan regulation. The nuclear form of CLK-1 and COQ7 is thought to regulate gene expression through an unidentified mechanism.
