= Collagen, type X, alpha 1 =

Protein found in humans

COL10A1
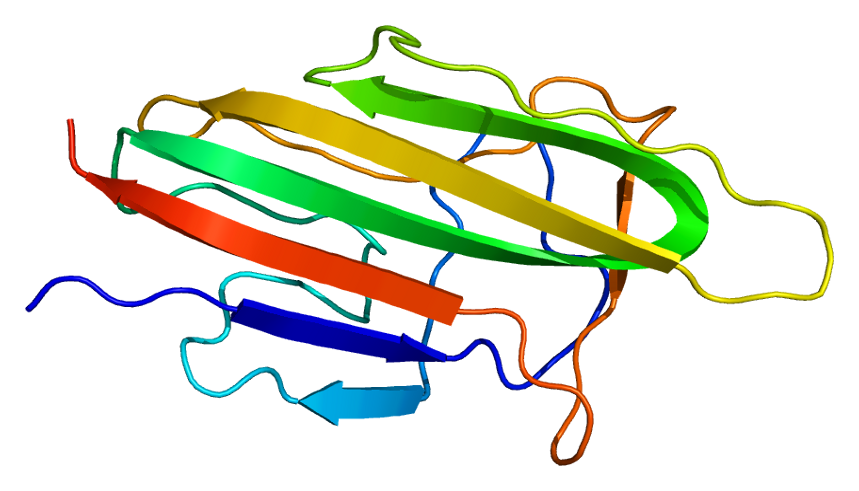

Identifiers
- Aliases: COL10A1, collagen type X alpha 1 chain
- External IDs: OMIM: 120110; MGI: 88445; GeneCards: COL10A1
Available structures
PDB	Ortholog search: PDBe RCSB
PDB	List of PDB id codes 1GR3

Gene location (Human)
Chr.	Chromosome 6 (human)
Band	6q22.1	Start	116,118,909 bp
Band	6q22.1	End	116,158,747 bp

Gene location (Mouse)
Chr.	Chromosome 10 (mouse)
Band	10 B1|10 18.85 cM	Start	34,265,977 bp
Band	10 B1|10 18.85 cM	End	34,273,081 bp
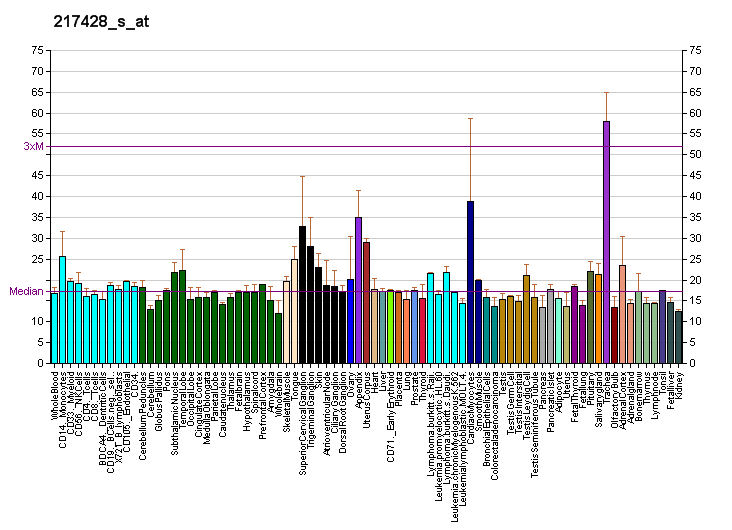

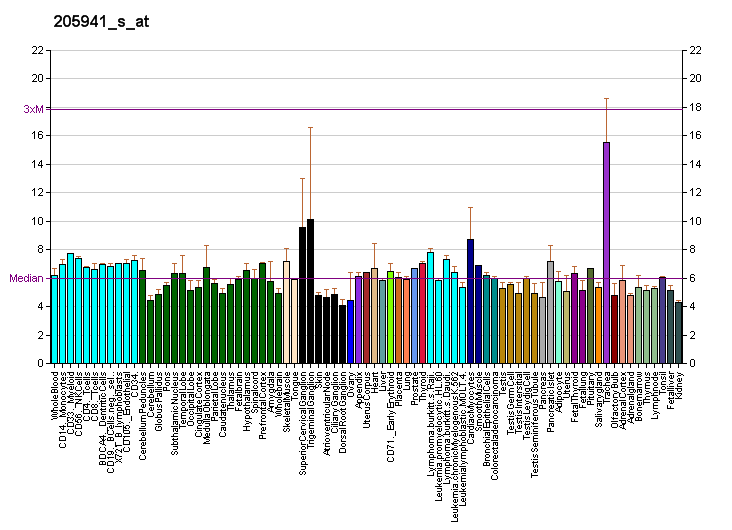
RNA expression pattern
Bgee	Human / Mouse (ortholog); Top expressed in: tibia; periodontal fiber; buccal mucosa cell; cartilage tissue; mucosa of paranasal sinus; trabecular bone; visceral pleura; gallbladder; Achilles tendon; pancreatic epithelial cell / Top expressed in: humerus; intercostal muscle; tibia; forearm; trachea; radius; epiphyseal plate; ulna; bones of pectoral girdle; human fetus; More reference expression data
BioGPS	More reference expression data
Gene ontology
Molecular function	protein binding; metal ion binding; extracellular matrix structural constituent; extracellular matrix structural constituent conferring tensile strength
Cellular component	cell cortex; collagen; endoplasmic reticulum lumen; extracellular region; extracellular matrix; extracellular space; collagen-containing extracellular matrix
Biological process	skeletal system development; extracellular matrix organization
Sources:Amigo / QuickGO
Orthologs
Databases	NCBI: entry; OMA: entry
Species	Human	Mouse
Entrez	1300	12813
Ensembl	ENSG00000123500	ENSMUSG00000039462
UniProt	Q03692	Q05306
RefSeq (mRNA)	NM_000493	NM_009925
RefSeq (protein)	NP_000484	NP_034055
Location (UCSC)	Chr 6: 116.12 – 116.16 Mb	Chr 10: 34.27 – 34.27 Mb
PubMed search
- Wikidata
View/Edit Human	View/Edit Mouse

Collagen alpha-1(X) chain is a protein that in humans is a member of the collagen family encoded by the COL10A1 gene.

This gene encodes the alpha chain of type X collagen, a short chain collagen expressed by hypertrophic chondrocytes during endochondral ossification. Unlike type VIII collagen, the other short chain collagen, type X collagen is a homotrimer. Type X collagen has a short triple helical collagen domain flanked by the N-terminal NC2 and the C-terminal NC1 domains. The C-terminal NC1 domain has complement C1q-like structure. Collagen X forms hexamer complexes through the association of NC1 regions. Mutations in this gene are associated with Schmid type metaphyseal chondrodysplasia (SMCD) and Japanese type spondylometaphyseal dysplasia (SMD).

DDR2 is a collagen receptor for it.

Recent studies into the early detection of colon cancer have identified COL10A1 protein levels in serum as a potential diagnostic biomarker candidate to detect both adenoma lesions and tumor.

Collagen alpha-1(X) undergoes degradation in the active growth plate releasing an intact NC1 region with a small amount of collagenous region attached. This degradation byproduct has been deemed CXM and has potential to be a useful biomarker to assess real time growth velocity in children and fracture healing in adults.
