= Maxillary hypoplasia =

Underdevelopment of the upper jawbone (maxilla)

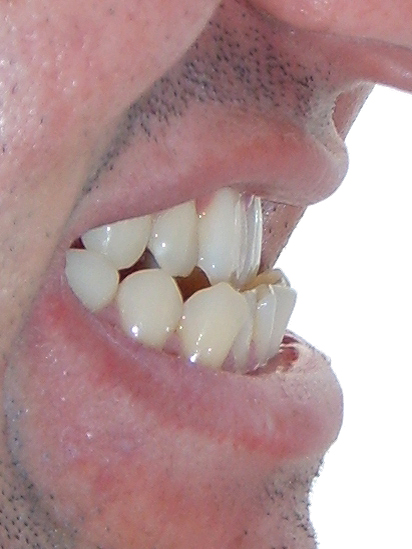
- Specialty: Maxillofacial surgery

Maxillary hypoplasia, or maxillary deficiency, is an underdevelopment of the bones of the upper jaw. It is associated with Crouzon syndrome, Angelman syndrome, as well as fetal alcohol syndrome. It can also be associated with cleft lip and cleft palate. Some people could develop it due to poor dental extractions.

== Signs and symptoms ==
The underdevelopment of the bones in the upper jaw, which gives the middle of the face a sunken look. This same underdevelopment can make it difficult to eat and can lead to complications such as nasopharyngeal airway restriction. This restriction causes forward head posture which can then lead to back pain, neck pain, and numbness in the hands and arms. The nasopharyngeal airway restriction can also lead to sleep apnea and snoring. Sleep apnea can lead to heart problems, endocrine problems, increased weight, and cognition problems, among other issues.

== Cause ==
Although the exact genetic link for isolated maxillary hypoplasia has not been identified, the structure of the facial bones as a whole relies on genetic inheritance and therefore there is likely an inheritance pattern. Maxillary hypoplasia can be present as part of genetic syndromes such as Angelman syndrome. Fetal alcohol syndrome is associated with maxillary hypoplasia. Injury to facial bones during childhood can lead to atypical growth. Exposure to phenytoin in the first trimester of pregnancy has also been associated with the development of maxillary hypoplasia.

== Pathophysiology ==
Abnormal development of the bones of the upper face which is usually a secondary effect of a different developmental abnormality. When associated with cleft lip and palate, the abnormal development can be due to deficiency in the ability to grow because of the cleft lip or palate. The underdevelopment can also be caused by scarring from surgical repair of a cleft lip or palate.

== Diagnosis ==
The diagnosis of maxillary hypoplasia is made mainly on visual inspection. The cheekbones and nose appear flat with thin lips and the lower jaw appears to be protruding even though it is normal in size. Computed tomography (CT) scan can be performed to compare the size of the maxilla and mandible.

== Treatment ==
Corrective surgery is the most common treatment to correct this disorder. It involves the repositioning of the upper jaw to align with the lower jaw, to provide symmetry. The surgery may be performed in consultation with an orthodontist who works on repositioning the teeth in the mouth. Severe cases require surgical correction after completing craniofacial growth around age 17-21. Milder forms without obstruction can be corrected for cosmetic reasons using veneers, snap in smiles, and overlay dentures

== Prognosis ==
When associated with nasopharyngeal occlusion, the person is more likely to spend their days in forward head posture which may lead to back pain, neck pain and numbness in the arms and hands. It can also lead to sleep apnea and snoring. People can generally live a relatively normal life with maxillary hypoplasia.

== Recovery ==
The recovery time after the surgery depends on the extent of the surgery itself. Patients are usually advised to eat soft foods for days, or sometimes weeks, to allow their jaw time to heal. They also require regular checkups with the doctor to monitor bone displacement, signs of infection, or other issues.

== Epidemiology ==
^{Maxillary hypoplasia is the most common secondary deformity that results from cleft lip and cleft palate. Because of the subjective nature of the diagnosis, the incidence of maxillary hypoplasia in people with cleft lip and palate varies between 15-50%. It is estimated that 25-50% of these patients require surgical intervention.}

== Research directions ==
Research on the topic of maxillary hypoplasia is currently focused on the best way to treat and manage the disorder. A retrospective study was published in January 2020 that evaluated the accuracy of virtual surgical planning-assisted management of maxillary hypoplasia. The study found that virtual surgical planning was an acceptable alternative to conventional planning and demonstrated to be very accurate.
