= Hypochondroplasia =

- Hypochondroplasia is autosomal dominant in inheritance.
- Specialty: Medical genetics
- Symptoms: Skeletal dysplasia
- Causes: FGFR3 gene mutation
- Diagnostic method: Physical finding, X-ray
- Treatment: Special education, Laminectomy

Hypochondroplasia (HCH) is a developmental disorder caused by an autosomal dominant genetic defect in the fibroblast growth factor receptor 3 gene (FGFR3) that results in a disproportionately short stature, micromelia and a head that appears large in comparison with the underdeveloped portions of the body. It is classified as short-limbed dwarfism.

== Signs and symptoms ==
Individuals affected by this disorder appear normal at birth. As the infant grows, however, their arms and legs do not develop properly, and their body becomes thicker and shorter than normal. The following are characteristics consistent with this condition:

- Brachydactyly
- Short stature
- Micromelia
- Skeletal dysplasia
- Abnormality of femur

== Cause ==
Hypochondroplasia is inherited as an autosomal dominant trait affecting the FGFR3 gene on chromosome 4p16.3. There is currently no cure for this condition.

== Pathophysiology ==
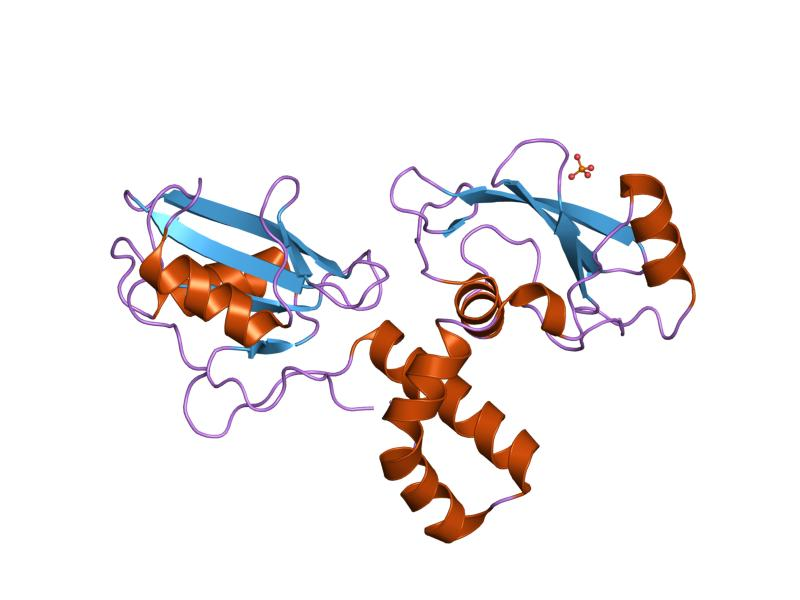
TYK

This disorder results from mutations in the proximal tyrosine kinase domain of the FGFR3 gene. This gene plays an important role in embryonic development, helping to regulate activities such as cell division, migration and differentiation.

Hypochondroplasia can be caused by point mutations such as p. Lys650Asn. In FGFR3, some 20 different mutations have been associated with hypochondroplasia, and it seems to have a role in skeletal dysplasia.

== Diagnosis ==
The diagnosis of this condition can be done via X-rays (with lack of normal distance L1 to L5), and additionally genetic testing is available to ascertain hypochondroplasia. However, the physical characteristics are one of the most important in determining the condition.

== Treatment ==
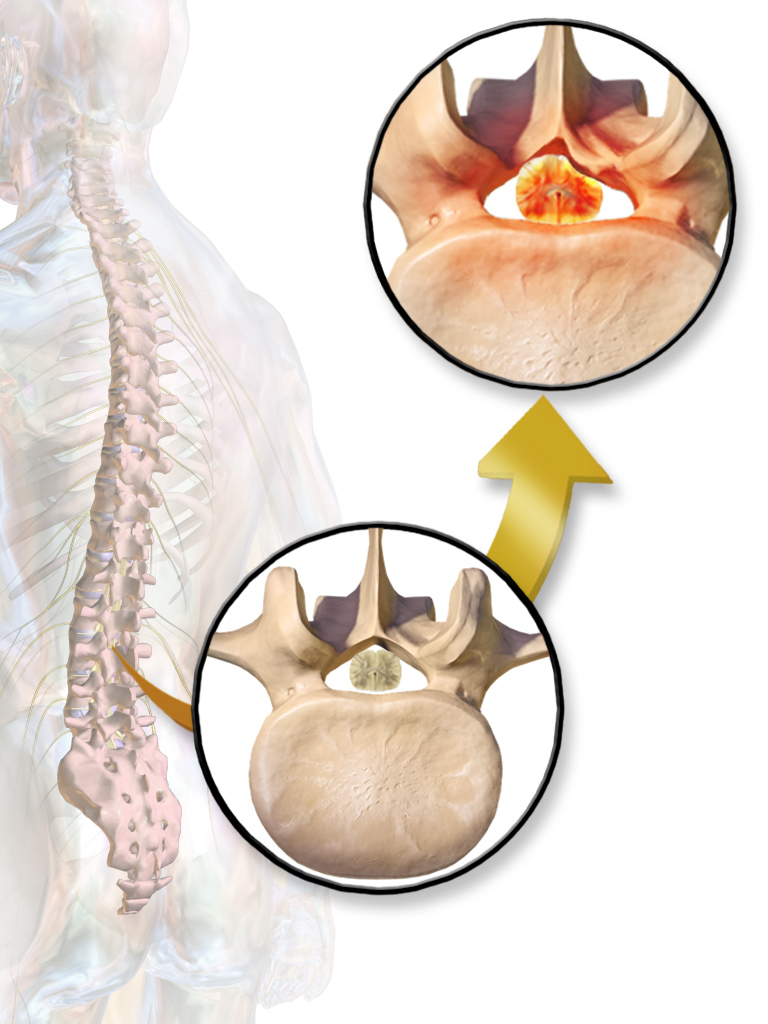
Spinal stenosis

Treatment of hypochondroplasia usually takes the form of orthopedic surgery and physical therapy. Genetic counseling is advised for individuals and their families. Specifically in the case of spinal stenosis, one option is laminectomy.

BioMarin Pharmaceutical is currently investigating the drug Voxzogo for treatment of Hypochondroplasia. The study is currently in a Phase 3 clinical trial.

== Prognosis ==
Life expectancy for individuals with hypochondroplasia is normal; height is about 132–147 centimetres (4 ft 4 in – 4 ft 10 in).

== See also ==
- Achondroplasia
- List of congenital disorders
