= Rhizomelia =

Abnormal shortness of the upper arms and thighs

Rhizomelia refers to either a disproportion of the length of the proximal limb, such as the shortened limbs of achondroplasia, or some other disorder of the hip or shoulder.

According to Stedman's medical dictionary "rhizomelic" means "relating to hip or shoulder joints", while "micromelic" means "having disproportionately short or small limbs". Genetic skeletal dysplasias or Osteochondrodysplasia frequently lead to short stature, occasionally termed dwarfism, which is classified into proportionate and disproportionate short stature. Disproportionate short stature is further classified short-limb short stature and short-trunk short stature. In turn, short-limb short stature is classified into a) Rhizomelic, b) mesomelic and c) acromelic short stature. Rhizomelic short stature refers to skeletal dysplasias where the main shortening is due to involvement of the proximal limb segments i.e. femora and humeri. Typical examples of Rhizomelic short stature are achondroplasia and pseudoachondroplasia.

== See also ==
- Amelia (birth defect)
- Rhizomelic chondrodysplasia punctata
