= Thanatophoric dysplasia =

Severe form of genetic dwarfism that is usually lethal

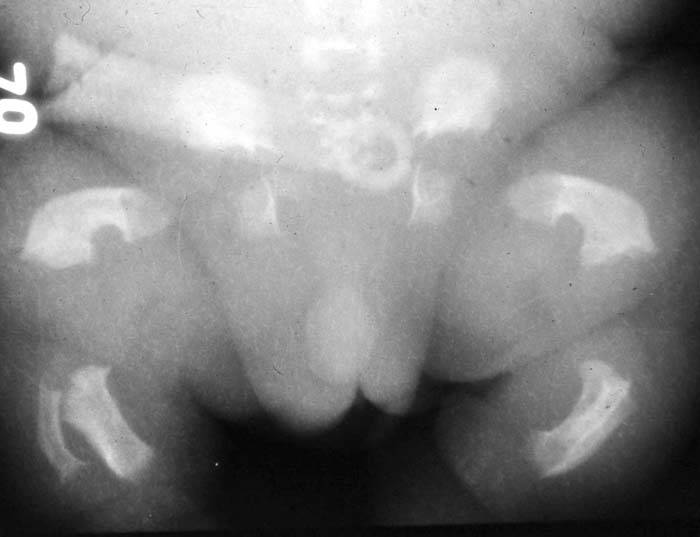
- Pelvic radiogram of a baby born with thanatophoric dwarfism
- Specialty: Medical genetics

Thanatophoric dysplasia is a severe genetic skeletal growth disorder characterized by a disproportionately small ribcage, extremely short limbs and folds of extra skin on the arms and legs.

== Symptoms and signs ==
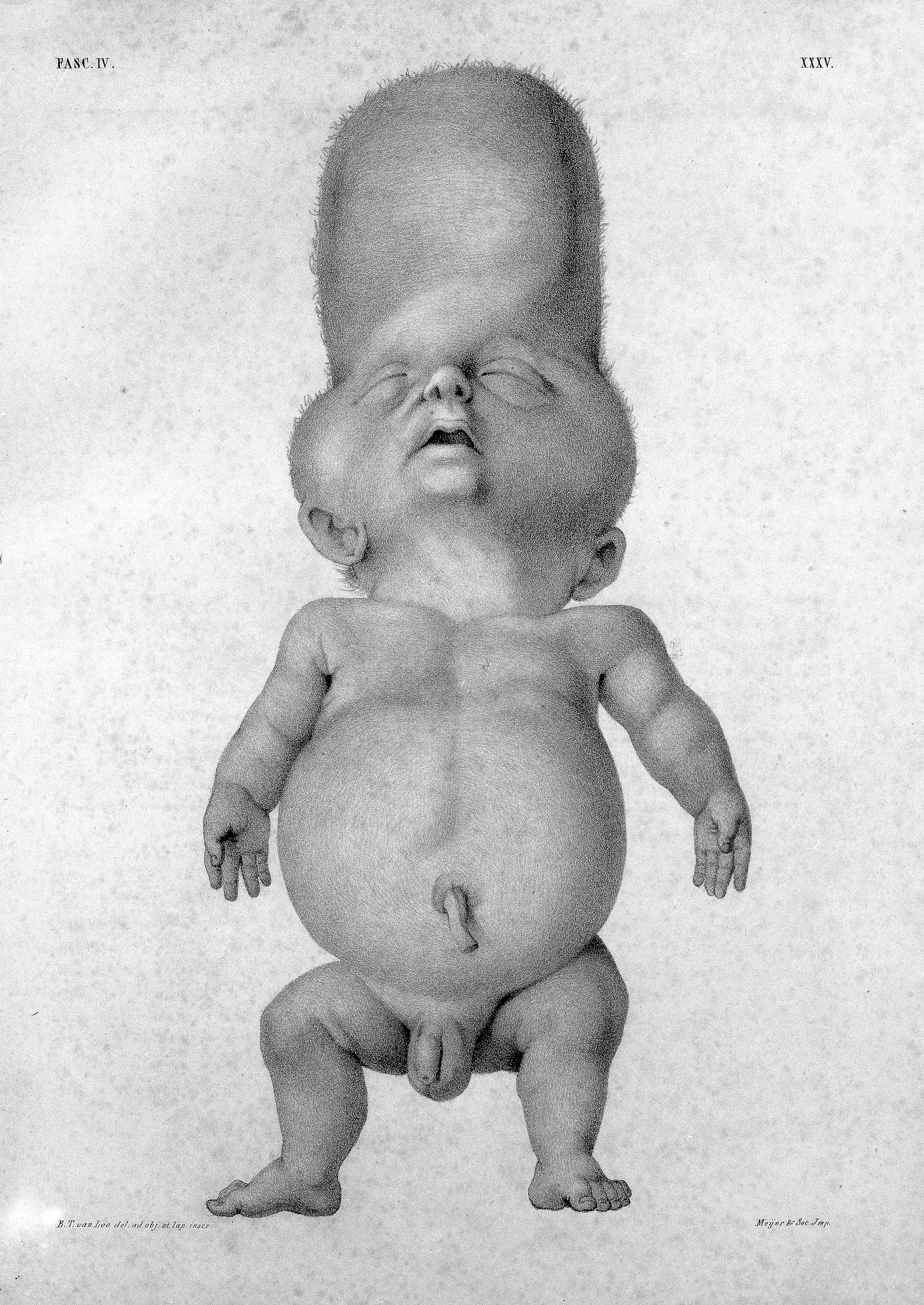
Drawing of a newborn with cloverleaf skull and shortened limbs (likely caused by thanatophoric dysplasia type 2), 1849

Infants with this condition have disproportionately short arms and legs with extra folds of skin. Other signs of the disorder include a narrow chest, small ribs, underdeveloped lungs, and an enlarged head with a large forehead and prominent, wide-spaced eyes. Thanatophoric dysplasia is a lethal skeletal dysplasia divided into two subtypes. Type I is characterized by extreme rhizomelia, bowed long bones, narrow thorax, a relatively large head, normal trunk length and absent cloverleaf skull. The spine shows platyspondyly, the cranium has a short base, and, frequently, the foramen magnum is decreased in size. The forehead is prominent, and hypertelorism and a saddle nose may be present. Hands and feet are normal, but fingers are short. Type II is characterized by short, straight long bones and cloverleaf skull. It presents with typical telephone-handle shaped long bones and H-shaped vertebrae.

== Causes ==
It is associated with various mutations within fibroblast growth factor receptor-3. It is inherited in an autosomal dominant manner.

While the condition can be inherited, most cases of thanatophoric dysplasia are caused by new mutations in people with no family history of the disorder. No individual with thanatophoric dysplasia is known to have had children, so the disorder has not been observed to have been passed down to the next generation. Thanatophoric dysplasia occurs in 1 in 20,000 to 50,000 newborns, and type I thanatophoric dysplasia is more common than type II thanatophoric dysplasia.

== Diagnosis ==
=== Classification ===
Infants with type 1 thanatophoric dysplasia also have curved thigh bones, flattened bones of the spine (platyspondyly) and shortened thoracic ribs. Note: Prenatal ultra-sound images of the ribs sometimes appear asymmetrical when in fact they are not. In certain cases, this has caused a misdiagnosis of osteogenesis imperfecta (OI) type II.

An unusual head shape called kleeblattschaedel ("cloverleaf skull") can be seen with type 2 thanatophoric dysplasia.

== Prognosis ==
The term thanatophoric is Greek for "death bearing". Children with this condition are usually stillborn or die shortly after birth from respiratory failure. A small number have survived into childhood, and a very few beyond. Survivors have difficulty breathing on their own and require respiratory support such as high flow oxygen through a canula or ventilator support via tracheostomy. There may also be evidence of spinal stenosis and seizures. The oldest known living TD survivor as of 2013 was a 29-year-old woman. One man lived to be 26 years old. Another man lived to age 20. It was reported in 1998 that a 21-year-old man with the condition lived in the United States, while two children with TD (aged 10 and 12, a boy and a girl) were known in Germany. There was also a 6-year-old boy living with TD and two 1-year-old boys. As of 2025, Christopher Álvarez, 28, is a Colombian man living with TD in New York City.
