= Cultural depictions of dwarfism =

Dwarfism has been showcased across many types of media. As popular media has become more prevalent, a greater number of works depicting dwarfism have popularized the condition.

== Literature ==
Several works of literature treat dwarfism as a major theme, with varying degrees of realism:

- The Tin Drum (Die Blechtrommel) by Günter Grass. The protagonist, Oskar Matzerath, refuses to grow up and as such goes through many large events in history with the stature of a small child.
- Stones from the River by Ursula Hegi. Trudi Montag is a dwarf who tries to survive in a small German town during World War II.
- The Dwarf by Pär Lagerkvist. The entire novel is based around a dwarf protagonist and his life in an Italian city-state.
- A Prayer for Owen Meany by John Irving. Owen Meany, the friend of the narrator and major focus of the story, is a dwarf with a fixed voicebox.
- "Hop-Frog, or The Eight Chained Ourang-Outangs" by Edgar Allan Poe. The titular character Hop-Frog and his friend Tripetta are dwarfs.
- A Song of Ice and Fire series by George R.R. Martin. A main character, Tyrion Lannister, is a dry, quick-witted dwarf who struggles with acceptance by "normal" people who mock him and call him "the Imp".
- Maybe the Moon, by Armistead Maupin, has as its protagonist Cadence Roth, a Jewish dwarf actress. The character is based on Maupin's friend Tamara De Treaux, who played the title role in the movie E.T.
- Geek Love by Katherine Dunn. The narrator of the novel, Olympia Binewski, is an albino hunchback dwarf whose family owns a traveling carnival.

== Film and television ==
Several works of visual arts treat dwarfism as a major theme, with varying degrees of realism:

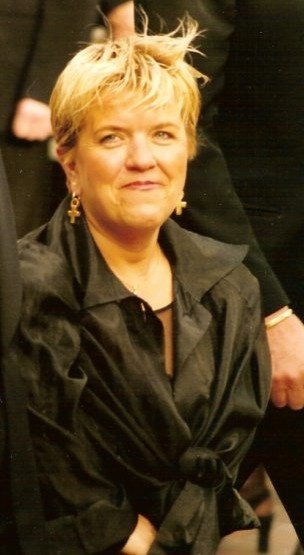
Mimie Mathy.

- In the 1960s and early 1970s, actor Michael Dunn was well known for his recurring role on television series The Wild Wild West, as Dr. Miguelito Loveless. In the pilot episode of the Mel Brooks and Buck Henry television spy spoof Get Smart, Dunn appeared as the well-heeled gangster Mr. Big, leader of an international crime syndicate.
- Even Dwarfs Started Small (Auch Zwerge haben klein angefangen) by Werner Herzog. The film's entire cast is made up of dwarfs. The film is about a group of dwarfs confined in an institution on a remote island rebel against the guards and director.
- Another film with an all-dwarf cast was The Terror of Tiny Town released in 1938. Filmed as a normal western on a full size set, it allowed for some sight gags like cowboys walking UNDER the batwing doors to enter the saloon.
- In the mid-1970s, Sid and Marty Krofft built an indoor theme park in Atlanta, Georgia called The World of Sid and Marty Krofft. The park included a live stage production, that was then the largest gathering of "little people" since the filming of The Wizard of Oz in 1937–38, as well as being the largest indoor theme park built to date. The facility that housed the theme park now houses the studios of CNN, the Cable News Network, and CNN Headline News.
- In the 1970s and 1980s, Filipino actor Weng Weng appeared in several feature films, and played the starring role in the spy movie spoof For Your Height Only and its sequel The Impossible Kid. The 1981 fantasy film Time Bandits featured six dwarf characters. The 1989 Indian Film, Apoorva Sagodharargal directed by Singeetam Srinivasa Rao, was one of the enduring works on dwarf characters in film.
- Since 1990, Fort Boyard has featured dwarfs as part of its main cast.
- In the 1990s, Seinfeld featured a dwarf character, Mickey Abbott, in seven episodes; Mickey was played by actor Danny Woodburn. He got into several physical altercations with 6-foot (1.8 m)-plus Kramer. In one episode, he was ostracized by his dwarf peers for using lifts in his shoes to make him look taller.
- French actress and comedian Mimie Mathy is the star of the TV series Joséphine ange gardien, broadcast on TF1 since 1997, in which she plays a guardian angel who helps a variety of people solve their problems, with the help of her magical powers and good sense.
- Actor and stunt man Verne Troyer has become famous playing the character "Mini-Me" in two Austin Powers movies (1999 & 2002). Fellow stuntman Jason "Wee-Man" Acuña also achieved fame, as one of the Jackass cast-members.
- Actor Peter Dinklage played the lead role of Finbar McBride in the 2003 film The Station Agent. The movie won Sundance Film Festival awards that year. (Best Drama, Audience Award; Best Screenplay, Tom McCarthy). From 2011 until 2019 he starred in the HBO series Game of Thrones, based on George R.R. Martin's series of novels A Song of Ice and Fire, which earned him the Emmy Award for Outstanding Supporting Actor in a Drama Series as well as the Golden Globe Award for Best Supporting Actor in a Series, Miniseries or Television Film.

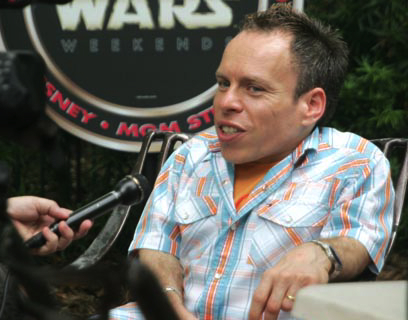
Warwick Davis.

- The actor Warwick Davis has found success in several notable fantasy franchises, including Star Wars, Harry Potter, Willow, Gulliver's Travels, The 10th Kingdom, and The Chronicles of Narnia (both the 1989 television serial and again in the 2008 film version of Prince Caspian).
- Actor Tony Cox has appeared in several movies such as Friday, Bad Santa, and Date Movie.
- Deep Roy, another actor with dwarfism, acted in movies such as Star Wars as an Ewok, and—his most famous role—all of the Oompa Loompas in Charlie and the Chocolate Factory.
- The Littlest Groom (2004) was a Bachelor-style reality television miniseries that aired for two episodes on the Fox network. The show followed salesman Glen Foster, a 4'5" little person, in his search for love.
- The Orator (2011), Samoa's first ever feature film, is the story of a dwarf taro farmer (portrayed by Fa'afiaula Sagote) who "attempts to reclaim his father's chiefly status, even if the current ageing village chief does not believe he has the physique or the oratory skill required".
- Since 2006, Dylan Postl has appeared on WWE programming as Hornswoggle, a wrestling leprechaun.
- Matt Roloff, Amy Roloff, and their children are the stars of a TLC reality show Little People Big World. The show portrays the family's everyday life, showcasing the unique challenges being a little person brings. Another TLC reality program concerning little people is titled The Little Couple and features pediatric specialist Dr. Jennifer Arnold and her husband, businessman Bill Klein. It focuses in on their lives together as a married couple and parents and their individual lives as educated, white-collar professionals.
- In 2009, The Simpsons episode Eeny Teeny Maya Moe focused on a relationship between bartender Moe and Maya. They meet via knock-knock jokes on an online dating service, and Moe is surprised when he meets her in real life to discover that she is a little person. Their relationship has kind and sincere moments, but Maya breaks up with Moe after his marriage proposal and attempted surgery to make himself shorter. Her character later returns in 2021 episode The Wayz We Were.
- Ex-con and pit bull advocate Shorty Rossi is the star of another dwarf reality program, Pit Boss, that aired from 2010 to 2013 on Animal Planet. Rossi also appears on other Animal Planet programs, most notably the "World's Cutest Dog/Cat" ones.
- The Man from Another Place is a recurring character in the television series Twin Peaks. He is an evil entity who appears to FBI agent Dale Cooper as a dwarf in a red suit. The actor who portrayed him, Michael J. Anderson, is not a dwarf but rather has a genetic disorder called osteogenesis imperfecta.
- Nathaniel "Biggie" Jones is a dwarf and circus showman in a 1970s-set episode of Cold Case titled "Metamorphosis". Michael J. Anderson portrayed Biggie as a senior citizen, while Mark Povinelli portrayed Biggie in flashback scenes of the year 1971.
- Edna Mode (portrayed by Brad Bird) is the fashion designer for the Supers in The Incredibles.
- Kenny (played by Kenneth Hall) is the dwarf henchman of corrupt corporate executive Yuri in the 2014 Canadian dark fantasy feature film Patch Town.
- Billy Kwan (portrayed by female character actress Linda Hunt) was a Chinese-Australian dwarf who worked as a cameraman alongside protagonist Guy Hamilton (Mel Gibson) in the 1982 feature film The Year of Living Dangerously. Billy and Guy follow the latent developments pointing to a bloody civil war in Indonesia during the 1960s.
- Orphan features an over-thirty-year-old woman with proportional dwarfism named Lena, who poses as a nine-year-old little girl from Russia named Esther. Lena/Esther was not played by an actress with dwarfism, but instead by child actress Isabelle Fuhrman.
- An unnamed female dwarf (played by Adelina Poerio) is revealed to be the mass murderer in a grieving father's life in the 1970s horror film Don't Look Now.
- A number of reality television series on Lifetime, beginning with Little Women: LA in 2014, focused on showing the lives of women living with dwarfism in various cities around the United States.

== Reoccurring characters ==
- Baby-Doll is a reoccurring DC Comics character who has appeared in various television shows, comic books, fanfictions and literature. The character is portrayed as a dwarf with a kidney disease, and she has chosen to indulge in criminal activity after a lengthy career playing the role of a little girl in a family sitcom. Baby-Doll dresses like classic little girl characters and actresses in cinema, including Rhoda Penmark and Shirley Temple.
- The Munchkins are a group of reoccurring fictional dwarfs in L. Frank Baum's The Wonderful Wizard of Oz and associated media, which included a book series, a Metro-Goldwyn Mayer movie, a Disney movie and a variety of spin-off cartoons, merchandise and parodies.
- "General Tom Thumb" (real name Charles Stratton) is a real-life dwarf circus performer who has been fictionally depicted in a variety of media, most notably in the 2017 family drama musical The Greatest Showman, where he was portrayed by actor Sam Humphrey.

== Controversial depictions ==
Many different film and production agencies have been criticized for how they portray dwarfism in the media. Several of the issues pertain to these agencies presenting characters with dwarfism as fantastical, abnormal, or unusual. Most roles available for actors with dwarfism are limited to “dwarf, pygmies, elves, munchkin, and monster [characters]”. This has been extremely harmful to the treatment of little people in public life which has been highlighted through the lived experiences of people with dwarfism. In an interview, a little person noted that “they [little people in entertainment] were either funny or scary; and that’s how people reacted towards [them]; constantly: [they were] either funny or scary”. Another barrier that little people face, specifically actors, is that goals to stop perpetuating stereotypes through limiting casting them for fantastical roles, has decreased acting opportunities and visibility for little people.

=== Snow White (2025 film) ===
The live-action adaptation of the Disney film, Snow White, has received backlash and praise for its portrayal of the seven dwarfs using CGI. Well-known actor with dwarfism, Peter Dinklage, says that casting a latina actress for Snow White, but “still telling the story of the seven dwarfs who live in the cave [is] backwards”. Erin Pritchard, a professor at The London School of Economics, who has dwarfism, says that the production’s commitment to diversifying the seven dwarfs by varying their races, genders, and height, gives her hope that representations of little people in the media are changing.

=== Wonka (2023 film) ===
Wonka, an adaptation of the 1971 film, Willy Wonka and the Chocolate Factory, has received negative feedback for casting a non-disabled, average height actor as an Oompa Loompa, and using technology to make him shorter. Criticisms of portraying Oompa Loompas in this way included not only the perpetuation of stereotypes—little people as fantastical creatures, but some people with dwarfism felt it further restricted the opportunities dwarf actors have.

=== Willow (1988 film) ===
At the time Willow was created, it was seen revolutionary in how it portrayed little people as leading normal lives, having families, and being human. Additionally it had a positive central message surrounding the notion that size does not determine one's worth or ability to accomplish. Despite these progressive movements to better understand true lived experiences of a little person, the film received backlash on perpetuating stereotypes that people with dwarfism are fantasy creatures. For example, in the film, people with dwarfism were called Nelwyns, an imaginative race that did not exist.

== Unharmful depictions ==
Little people feel they are best represented in the media when portrayed as a typical person who has responsibilities and obligations similar to most people and not a fantastical character or someone to laugh at. People with dwarfism are depicted in this way commonly in reality TV shows or documentaries; however, there are some fictional series that cast little people as characters that are not centered around the disability.

=== EastEnders (TV series) ===
EastEnders is a fictional soap opera in the UK that had cast a little person as one of the school teachers. The portrayal of the little person—where the character did not depend on whether the actor had dwarfism or not—emphasized that little people are “just like anyone else in society”. This was a progressive depiction of little people in the media as it signaled a shift away from a fantastical perception of little people.

== Board games ==
- HeroQuest features a dwarf as one the four playable characters.

== Video games ==
- In World of Warcraft, dwarves are one of the playable races of the Alliance.
