= The Littlest Groom =

2004 reality television special

- Genre: Reality television
- Directed by: Scott Messick
- Presented by: Dani Behr
- Country of origin: United States
- Original language: English

Production
- Executive producers: Eric Schotz; Bill Paolantonio
- Running time: 60 minutes
- Production company: LMNO Entertainment

Original release
- Network: Fox
- Release: February 16 – February 23, 2004

The Littlest Groom is an American reality television special broadcast by the Fox Broadcasting Company (Fox). The two-part special premiered on February 16, 2004, and concluded on February 23, 2004. The special followed Glen Foster, a 23-year-old little person, in search of love among a group of 12 women. Similar to Foster, the women were all little people; Foster narrowed the women down through a series of one-on-one dates and group activities. After eliminating several of the women from the competition, Foster's dating pool was expanded to include several average-height women. At the end of the special, Foster was required to make a choice over who he felt most compatible with between the remaining two women in the competition. The special was hosted by English television presenter Dani Behr.

The Littlest Groom was a part of Fox's intent to capitalize on a rising interest in little people-themed reality television shows. The special, however, was met with negative reception from television critics, who generally deemed the special to be exploitative of little people. Conversely, advocacy groups, such as Little People of America, praised the special for promoting a positive portrayal of little people. The Littlest Groom averaged 9.9 million viewers for the two parts of the special, which was modest for the network. Since its conclusion, Fox has expressed interest in making a sequel to the special.

== Production ==
American television presenter Mark L. Walberg was initially asked to serve as the special's host. Walberg explained, "I think [the network is] going to make fun of little people, and while I’ll secretly watch, I don’t feel comfortable hosting it."

== Reception ==
The show was subjected to considerable negative criticism from media critics and the general public, due to its purportedly exploitative “latter-day freak show” dimension or “carnival-like” quality. Nonetheless, at least one of the little women who appeared on the show explicitly rejected this interpretation, as did Foster himself.

Similarly, Matt Roloff, then-president of the advocacy group Little People of America, commented on the potential for The Littlest Groom to provide a positive media representation of little people as individuals “just being themselves". “[H]iding us behind closed doors or in funny costumes”, he observed, “will never give us the exposure needed to desensitize society to us”.

== See also ==
- Cultural depictions of dwarfism
