= LMNO Entertainment =

American television production company

LMNO Productions, Inc.
- Trade name: LMNO Entertainment
- Company type: Private
- Industry: Television production
- Founded: June 30, 1986; 39 years ago
- Founder: Eric Schotz
- Headquarters: Encino, California, United States
- Key people: Eric Schotz (President and CEO)
- Products: Television programs
- Number of employees: 100
- Divisions: LMNO Cable Group
- Website: www.lmnoentertainment.com

LMNO Productions, Inc. (doing business as LMNO Entertainment) is an American television production company that is headquartered in Encino, California and was founded on June 30, 1986, by Eric Schotz, known for producing Kids Say the Darndest Things.

== History ==
The company was founded on June 30, 1986, by Eric Schotz. On June 30, 2016, the Federal Bureau of Investigation (FBI) raided LMNO offices in Encino, California and Discovery Communications filed a lawsuit against the company due to an accounting scandal over the company's The Little Couple television show.

== Television programs ==
Title	Years	Network	Notes
How'd They Do That	1993-1997	CBS	
Shame on You	c. 1993	CBS	Hosted by Cristina Ferrare
Behind Closed Doors	1996-2001	A&E and ABC	
Ordinary/Extraordinary	1997-1998	CBS	
Kids Say the Darndest Things	1998-2000	CBS	co-production with CBS Productions
Guinness World Records Primetime	1998-2001	Fox	
The Greatest	1998-2000	TLC	
Commander in Chief	2000	TLC	
Truth	2000	MTV	
World's Best	2000	Travel Channel	
Boot Camp	2001	Fox	co-production with Granada Entertainment USA
City Medical	2001-2002	Discovery Health Channel	
WinTuition	2002-2004	Game Show Network	
Amazing Medical Stories	2002-2004	TLC	
Impact: Stories of Survival	2002-2005	Discovery Health Channel	also known as Did You See That?
Babies: Special Delivery	2002-2006	Discovery Health Channel	
Race to the Altar	2003	NBC	
Special Delivery: Baby ER	2003	Discovery Health Channel	
Animal Kidding	2003-2004	Animal Planet	
Wickedly Perfect	2004-2005	CBS	
American Icons	2004	Travel Channel	
The Littlest Groom	2004	Fox	
Extreme Reunion	2004	NBC	
I Wanna Be a Soap Star	2004-2007	SoapNet	
Who Gets the Dog	2005	Animal Planet	
Food Wars	2005	Travel Channel	
My War Diary	2006-2007	Military Channel	
Dr. Keith Ablow	2006-2007	Syndication	co-production with Telepictures Productions and distributed by Warner Bros. Television
Deserving Design	2007	HGTV	
That's Gotta Hurt	2007	TLC	
Wedding Central	2007	We TV	
The Little Couple	2009–present	TLC	
I Get That a Lot	2009-2015	CBS	
Fabulous Cakes	2010	TLC	
Seriously Funny Kids	2011	Lifetime	
The Bear Whisperer	2011	Animal Planet	
Cheating Vegas	2012	Destination America	
Lost and Found	2013	Oprah Winfrey Network	
Murder Book	2014	Investigation Discovery	
Diabolical Women	2015	Lifetime Movie Network	
D.B. Cooper: Case Closed?	2016	History	

=== Television specials and films ===
- ABC Fall Preview (1990)
- Put to the Test (1996)
- The World's Most Shocking Medical Videos (1999)
- The World's Greatest Pets (1999)
- Pearl Harbor: Battle in Paradise (2001)
- Celebrity Boot Camp (2002)
- Man vs. Beast (2003)
- The First Annual Miss Dog Beauty Pageant (2003)
- Man vs. Beast 2 (2004)
- That's Just Wrong (2004)
- 101 Things Removed from the Human Body (2005)
- 101 More Things Removed from the Human Body (2007)
- Little People: Just Married (2009)
