= Impact: Stories of Survival =

American documentary television series

- Also known as: Did You See That?
- Genre: Docudrama; Documentary
- Narrated by: Thom Beers; Wally Wingert; Bill Ratner
- Composer: Paul Hepker
- Country of origin: United States
- Original language: English
- No. of seasons: 3
- No. of episodes: 30

Production
- Executive producers: Thom Beers; Eric Schotz; Bill Paolantonio; Bob Niemack; Marly Carpenter
- Production companies: Original Productions (Season 1); LMNO Cable Group (Season 2-3)

Original release
- Network: Discovery Health Channel
- Release: July 1, 2002 – April 25, 2005

Impact: Stories of Survival (also known as Did You See That? on streaming platforms) is an American documentary television series that aired from 2002-2005 on the Discovery Health Channel. It was narrated by Thom Beers, Wally Wingert, and Bill Ratner in Seasons 1, 2, and 3, respectively.

The program is based on life-threatening situations in which the victim experienced a moment of impact. Featuring video of the event, reenactments, and interviews with surgeons, doctors, and the victims, Impact takes its viewers through the full process of the victim's impact, treatment and recovery. There is also a segment where a computerized animation shows, in detail, how the impact affected the victim's body. The segment shows how, and to what extent, bones, organs, veins, etc. were injured.

== Episodes ==
=== Series overview ===
Season	Episodes	Originally released	
Season	Episodes	First released	Last released
1	10	July 1, 2002	September 23, 2002
2	10	December 5, 2003	May 14, 2004
3	10	November 8, 2004	April 25, 2005

=== Season 1 (2002) ===
No. overall	No. in season	Title	Written by	Original release date
1	1	"Stock Car Smash"	Sridhar Dasari, Joanne Fish, Dan Jackson & Holly A. Murdoch	July 1, 2002
A high speed boat crash; a man is scalded when a pipe bursts; luge racer Anne Abernathy crashes; a paramedic named Mike Staley is hit by a race car at the 1990 ARCA 200.
2	2	"Parachute Collision"	Sridhar Dasari, Joanne Fish & Holly A. Murdoch	July 8, 2002
Two skydivers collide in midair; a teenage girl's arm is crushed under a car; motorcycle stuntman Doug Danger slams into a concrete wall; a construction worker hits an underground power line with a jack hammer.
3	3	"Demolition Derby Disaster"	Joanne Fish, Dawn Fitzgerald & Holly A. Murdoch	July 22, 2002
A car accident leaves a man impaled on a fence pole; a gymnast snaps her knee after a vault; a demolition derby driver is trapped in his burning car; a 16-year-old is crushed by a horse at a rodeo.
4	4	"Knockout Punch"	Sridhar Dasari, Dawn Fitzgerald & Holly A. Murdoch	July 29, 2002
A heavyweight champion is paralyzed by a blow to the head; a dog attack tears a woman's scalp off; a man is trapped in a submerged car for 30 minutes; a man receives a hand transplant after a firecracker destroys his hand.
5	5	"Shark Attack"	Unknown	August 5, 2002
A woman falls off her motorcycle during a race, and another motorcycle slams into her back; a fallen tree limb traps an injured woman in her car; a South African surfer is attacked by a great white shark; a Southern Pacific rattlesnake locks onto a man's thumb.
6	6	"Rappel Gone Wrong"	Unknown	August 12, 2002
A cliff jumper's cord snaps, causing him to land on his face; a police officer is shot with exploding bullets; a high school wrestler snaps his elbow; a man trapped in a wrecked vehicle cuts off his hand to escape.
7	7	"Snowmobile Slam"	Unknown	August 19, 2002
A motorcyclist crashes at 180 MPH while trying to break the land speed record in the Mojave Desert; a snowmobiler fails to jump a ravine and loses over half his teeth; a snowboarder has severe frost bite after being lost in snow-covered mountains for five days and nights; a construction worker falls 70 feet and is impaled on a rebar.
8	8	"Bear Attack"	Sridhar Dasari, Dawn Fitzgerald, Dan Jackson & Kelly McPherson	August 26, 2002
A base jumper pulls his parachute too late and hits water at 80 MPH; a man's head is crushed between factory rollers; a snowmobiler attempts to jump a house and snaps his leg; a bear attack disfigures a man's face.
9	9	"Cyclist Run Over"	Dawn Fitzgerald, Kelly McPherson, Laura Netscher, Gabrielle Saveri & Dan Jackson	September 16, 2002
A man's leg is severely injured in a failed motorcycle jump; a triathlete is run over by a camera car during a bicycle race; a skier falls down a hill and hits a tree; a car collides with a parked pickup truck, propelling a metal ladder into a man's face.
10	10	"Drag Race Disaster"	Dawn Fitzgerald, Amber Howell, Laura Netscher, Curt Paine & Dan Jackson	September 23, 2002
Motorcycle drag racers collide; a Marine Corps pilot crashes into the runway during an air show; a teenager is injured in a jet ski collision; a police officer is shot by bank robbers during the North Hollywood shootout.

=== Season 2 (2003-04) ===
No. overall	No. in season	Original title (top) Streaming title (bottom)	Original release date
11	1	"Speared by Marlin" "Speared by a Marlin"	December 5, 2003
A marlin spears a woman through the chest; a gunman shoots a grocery store employee twice at close range with a shotgun; a rock climber falls and lands on his head; a street luge racer crashes and nearly severs his foot.
12	2	"Stunt Plane Smash" "Jockey Hits the Rail"	December 12, 2003
A jockey is slammed against a metal railing; a stunt plane loses power and smashes into a runway; a skateboarder falls and hits the back of his head on pavement.
13	3	"Ejection Seat Accident" "Aunt Bee Sting"	December 26, 2003
An elderly woman receives over 500 bee stings; an Air Force pilot ejects at mach one speed; two college students are shot; an overturned tractor pins a farm worker underwater in an irrigation ditch contaminated with weed killer.
14	4	"Canyon Crash" "Waterski Wounds"	January 30, 2004
A water-skier is dragged through the water by her neck; a boy is impaled through the mouth by a rebar; a teenager drives his truck off a 300-foot cliff; a skateboarder snaps his leg.
15	5	"The Risks of Rodeo" "Pinned Officer"	February 20, 2004
A stalker pins a cop between two cars; a snake handler is bitten by a cobra; a bull rider is injured on two different occasions; a snow biker is thrown from a bicycle at 100 MPH.
16	6	"Snowboard Plunge" "Hard Landing"	March 12, 2004
A parachutist hits the ground at 60 MPH; speed boat legend Tim Morgan crashes at over 200 MPH and suffers a neck injury; a snowboarder launches off an 80-foot cliff and lands on a rock; a cheerleader falls during a stunt and lands head-first on a concrete floor.
17	7	"Martial Artist on Fire" "Skydiver Misses"	April 9, 2004
A skydiver hits a pond at 65 MPH; a martial artist is accidentally set on fire; an ice skater suffers a cracked skull; a girl is trapped underwater for five minutes following a boat collision, in addition to receiving head injuries from the boat's propeller.
18	8	"Pentagon Survivor" "Pentagon 9/11"	April 16, 2004
A man is burned in the September 11, 2001 attack on the Pentagon; Olympic gymnast Jason Gatson returns after a serious knee injury only to injure his knee again; a seven-ton killer whale jumps on its trainer.
19	9	"Avalanche" "Handlebar Smash"	April 30, 2004
A motorcyclist ruptures his skull in an extreme jump; a vascular surgeon's fingers are shattered by a table saw; a skier suffers a snapped femur in an avalanche; a basketball player's fall causes a blood clot on his spinal cord, resulting in paralysis.
20	10	"Building Collapse" "Pizza Man"	May 14, 2004
A man is impaled through the skull by a rebar; a building collapses on a firefighter; a parachutist smacks against a hillside at 40 MPH; a tackle splits a high school football player's liver in half.

=== Season 3 (2004-05) ===
No. overall	No. in season	Original title (top) Streaming title (bottom)	Original release date
21	1	"Mountain Lion Attack" "Mountain Lion"	November 8, 2004
A woman is bitten in the face by mountain lion while biking; a human cannonball overshoots the landing pad and hits the ground at 60 MPH; a man is impaled through the head by a boat anchor; a rescue helicopter crashes into a mountainside and rolls over a crew member.
22	2	"Hit by a Train" "Kayaker Flips"	November 15, 2004
A kayaker is trapped underwater for over six minutes when his boat rolls over and becomes lodged in rocks; a man falls from a four-wheeler and suffers a brain injury; a man gets his foot stuck in a railroad crossing and is run over by an oncoming train.
23	3	"Chariot Crash" "Skier Calls It A Wrap"	November 29, 2004
A skier tumbles down a rocky mountainside and slams into a tree; a teen on an ATV hits a fence post and severs her trachea; a chariot racer sustains multiple injuries after being catapulted; a mountain climber falls 60 feet into a crevasse.
24	4	"Propeller Smash" "Indy Driver Hits A Wall"	December 6, 2004
A race car driver suffers a severe spinal fracture after crashing and spinning out at over 200 MPH; an airplane propeller slices through mechanic's head; a 12-year-old boy is pinned behind 1000 pounds of collapsed dry wall; an extreme skier falls over 600 feet down a rocky mountainside.
25	5	"A Jump Too Far"	January 10, 2005
A motocross jumper overshoots his landing and slams into the ground; a man in a pickup truck hits a metal pipe gate head-on and is impaled through the stomach; a criminal shoots a cop four times at close range and hijacks her car; a teenage girl is hit in the head with a golf club.
26	6	"Dragster Disintegrates" "Dragster Crashes"	February 7, 2005
A drag racer's car crashes and disintegrates at 300 MPH; a camper trips and falls face-first onto a pitchfork; a woman's heart stops when she is struck by lightning at the beach; a bull rider is hit in the head by a bull's horn, and then he is trampled two months later.
27	7	"Photographer Electrocuted" "Shark Attack"	February 28, 2005
A teen loses her leg in a shark attack; a metal scrap flies through a car windshield and impales a passenger through the neck; a news photographer is electrocuted with 15,000 volts when he touches a power line with an antenna; a jockey falls during a race and is trampled by a stampede of horses.
28	8	"Paralyzed Player"	March 21, 2005
A high school football player is paralyzed from the neck down after a tackle; two victims are both shot in the head during a parking lot robbery; a teen is impaled by a two-by-four in a car accident, and the removal surgery is caught on tape; strong winds cause a skydiver to hit the ground with the impact of a four-story fall.
29	9	"Motocross Mess"	April 11, 2005
A motocross jumper comes up short and crashes into a sand dune; a hiker falls into a creek and is swept over a 40-foot waterfall; a teenager gets a blood clot on his brain after being hit in the head with a baseball, and the accident leads to the discovery that his kidneys are failing; a tobacco store clerk is severely beaten during a robbery.
30	10	"Tornado Survivor" "2x4 In The Neck"	April 25, 2005
Tornado winds hurl a wooden stake through a woman's neck; a veterinarian is bitten by a diamondback rattlesnake, and no nearby hospitals have the antivenin; a man's legs are severed when he is crushed between two trucks; motocross jumper Brian Deegan crashes while attempting a stunt involving a backflip.

== Episode status ==
As of 2022, the second and third seasons of the program are available for streaming online on Prime Video, Pluto TV and Tubi under the title Did You See That?.
