= Little People Big World: Wedding Farm =

- Genre: Reality
- Starring: Amy Roloff; Matthew Roloff
- Country of origin: United States
- No. of seasons: 1
- No. of episodes: 6

Production
- Executive producers: Amy Roloff; Gay Rosenthal; Joe Freed; Matt Roloff; Sven Nilsson
- Running time: 40 minutes to 42 minutes
- Production company: Gay Rosenthal Productions

Original release
- Network: TLC
- Release: November 13 – December 18, 2012

Related
- Little People, Big World

Little People Big World: Wedding Farm is an American reality documentary series that debuted on November 13, 2012 on TLC. The series is a spin-off of Little People, Big World.

== Premise ==
The series follows Amy and Matthew Roloff as they venture into the wedding planning business. The series will also encompass the daily lives of the family, just like their original series Little People, Big World.

== Episodes ==
No.	Title	Original release date	U.S. viewers (millions)
1	"A New Chapter"	November 13, 2012	1.656
2	"A Matrimonial Mess"	November 20, 2012	1.022
3	"Molly Moves Out"	November 27, 2012	1.090
4	"Big Wedding, Big Problems"	December 4, 2012	1.243
5	"Matt Versus the Volcano"	December 11, 2012	0.968
6	"Matt and Amy's 25th Anniversary"	December 18, 2012	1.014
