= List of Little People, Big World episodes =

A listing of episodes of the TLC television program Little People, Big World.

== Series overview ==
Season	Episodes	Specials	Originally released	
Season	Episodes	Specials	First released	Last released
Pilot	1	—N/a	March 4, 2006	
1	20	—N/a	March 25, 2006	May 13, 2006
2	22	—N/a	October 7, 2006	December 23, 2006
3	30	2	April 8, 2007	July 16, 2007
4	20	—N/a	October 15, 2007	December 17, 2007
5	26	—N/a	March 3, 2008	May 26, 2008
6	22	—N/a	October 13, 2008	December 22, 2008
7	26	—N/a	February 15, 2009	May 11, 2009
8	20	—N/a	October 12, 2009	January 18, 2010
9	20	—N/a	April 5, 2010	June 7, 2010
10	20	6	September 6, 2010	September 3, 2012
11	10	6	November 13, 2012	June 30, 2013
12	8	—N/a	October 29, 2013	December 17, 2013
13	6	—N/a	March 25, 2014	September 30, 2014
14	10	1	July 7, 2015	September 8, 2015
15	13	3	May 10, 2016	August 2, 2016
16	8	1	November 22, 2016	January 10, 2017
17	8	2	May 2, 2017	November 8, 2017
18	12	1	April 3, 2018	June 26, 2018
19	10	1	April 2, 2019	June 4, 2019
20	8	2	March 31, 2020	May 19, 2020
21	5	1	September 29, 2020	October 27, 2020
22	14	3	May 11, 2021	August 10, 2021
23	10	—N/a	May 17, 2022	July 19, 2022
24	11	—N/a	November 1, 2022	February 13, 2024
25	10	1	February 20, 2024	April 30, 2024

== Episodes ==
=== Pilot (2006) ===
No. overall	No. in season	Title	Original release date
1	Pilot	"American Families: Little People, Big Dreams"	March 4, 2006
Little People Matt and Amy Roloff may only be four feet tall, but they are determined to make the world their own. Raising four children - a mixture of Little and average size-siblings - the Roloffs strain under emotional and financial burdens. Laid-off for over a year, Matt struggles to get a new business off the ground, and Amy grows resentful when she is forced to go back to work for the first time in 14 years. The Roloff's son Zach learns painful lessons about life as a Little Person when, for the first time, he's too small and too slow to make the soccer team, and average-size kids gang up on him at his 14th birthday party.

=== Season 1 (2006) ===
No. overall	No. in season	Title	Original release date
2	1	"Living Little"	March 4, 2006
Twin Brothers Jeremy and Zach are feet apart but still twins.
3	2	"Twins?"	March 4, 2006
A series of vignettes depicting the twins' daily lives demonstrates the radical differences in dwarf Zach and average-sized Jeremy's everyday activities.
4	3	"Our Little Anniversary"	March 11, 2006
Matt and Amy skip their anniversary due to a hectic schedule, so the twins and Matt's parents arrange a party for them.
5	4	"Fathers and Sons"	March 11, 2006
The boys go on a camping trip while Amy and Molly stay at home.
6	5	"Birthday Girls"	March 18, 2006
Matt sends Amy and Molly to a bed and breakfast so that he, the twins, and his father can have her bathroom remodeled in time for her birthday.
7	6	"Back to School"	March 18, 2006
Zach and Jeremy's first day of high school.
8	7	"Testing Zach"	March 25, 2006
Zach repeatedly fails his driving exam.
9	8	"One Farm, Two Dreams"	March 25, 2006
Matt and Amy disagree about making money off the farm.
10	9	"Growing Up"	April 1, 2006
Jeremy brings his girlfriend to the farm. Molly works at a photo shoot.
11	10	"Treb-U-What?"	April 1, 2006
In order to promote the annual pumpkin harvest, Matt and one of his friends design and build a trebuchet.
12	11	"Merry Little Christmas"	April 8, 2006
It's Christmas time and Jeremy wants to spend more time with his girlfriend.
13	12	"New Year, New Plan"	April 8, 2006
Matt plans to redo the house.
14	13	"Zach's Future"	April 15, 2006
Matt takes Zach on a trip to visit a variety of dwarfs in a number of varied professions, including a college professor and a repairman on board a Navy submarine.
15	14	"Try, Try Again"	April 15, 2006
Zach goes to take his drivers permit test again.
16	15	"Running with the Pack"	April 29, 2006
Zach attends an LPA conference.
17	16	"Calm and Chaos"	April 29, 2006
Matt and Amy take a week-long cruise.
18	17	"Zach's Emergency"	May 6, 2006
Severe headaches and nausea lead Zach to the emergency room, where it's discovered that his shunt has disintegrated and that he requires emergency surgery.
19	18	"Matt's Big Change"	May 6, 2006
After years of self-employment, Matt goes back to working a white-collar job.
20	19	"First Date"	May 13, 2006
Having fully recovered from his surgery, Zach arranges to go on his first date.
21	20	"Little Kitchen, Big Future"	May 13, 2006
Before he's scheduled to take an extended business trip, Matt plans a total remodeling of the kitchen and family room to make them more accessible for him, Zach, and Amy.

=== Season 2 (2006) ===
No. overall	No. in season	Title	Original release date
22	1	"Twins at Sixteen"	October 7, 2006
Zach and Jeremy get ready to celebrate their sixteenth birthday.
23	2	"Organizing Amy"	October 7, 2006
The family celebrates Mother's Day, and Matt hires a professional organizer for Amy.
24	3	"The Greenhouse Effect"	October 14, 2006
After the farm's peach crop fails, Matt employs the children and their friends to help plant pumpkins.
25	4	"Get Out of Town"	October 14, 2006
The family prepares to take a vacation in Hawaii.
26	5	"Roloffs in Paradise"	October 21, 2006
Amy has trouble adjusting to being pampered.
27	6	"Aloha, Roloffs"	October 21, 2006
The Roloffs schedule their Hawaiian vacation to the last minute.
28	7	"Road to the DAAA"	October 28, 2006
Conflict erupts when Matt tries to help Zach put together a soccer team for the Dwarf Athletic Association of America Games.
29	8	"Game On!"	October 28, 2006
The DAAA Games begin, and Zach competes against a soccer team led by Martin Klebba. Zach's friend Casey Johnson (who competes in swimming in the DAAA games) is profiled.
30	9	"Little Fort, Big Deck"	November 4, 2006
While Matt is away on a business trip, Amy and Matt's father supervise the construction of a new deck. Jacob injures himself while helping Zach build a fort.
31	10	"All Decked Out"	November 4, 2006
Matt deals with a building inspector who finds the new deck is not up to code. Meanwhile, the kids begin a new school year and Jeremy gets in trouble over his long hair.
32	11	"While Amy's Away"	November 11, 2006
Amy travels to San Francisco to visit her sisters, while Matt buys a vintage Volkswagen Beetle.
33	12	"Zip to My Lu"	November 11, 2006
Matt has a zip-line built on the farm.
34	13	"A Little Thanksgiving: Part 1"	November 18, 2006
Matt and Amy prepare for a family reunion over Thanksgiving. But with a few days to go, Matt begins a major renovation of the living room.
35	14	"A Little Thanksgiving: Part 2"	November 18, 2006
Amy's father tours Roloff Farms and offers some constructive criticisms for Matt. The family has their pictures taken and gathers for Thanksgiving dinner.
36	15	"A Whole Lotta Little"	December 2, 2006
Matt and Zach arrive in Milwaukee for the annual Little People of America National Conference. Zach's friend "Little Zach" is profiled.
37	16	"A Big Little Conference"	December 2, 2006
The rest of the Roloff family arrives at the LPA conference. An orthopedist who specializes in treating little people advises surgery to treat Zach's leg pain.
38	17	"A Twin Experience"	December 9, 2006
Zach flies to Pasadena, California to visit with some LP friends. Jeremy watches a soccer game (where he meets Freddy Adu), and tries out for the US Youth Soccer Olympic Development Program.
39	18	"Little Farm, Big Apple"	December 9, 2006
Amy accompanies Matt on a business trip to New York City, while Jeremy injures himself at home.
40	19	"Mad About Mules"	December 16, 2006
Matt threatens to quit his job because the children are out of control when he is away. The twins' laziness and mischief get them grounded.
41	20	"Twin Trouble"	December 16, 2006
Another corporate picnic is coming to Roloff Farms. Matt and Amy have a few chores for the Roloff twins to do, but their laziness and mischief gets them grounded. The twins are assigned a lot of extra work, including moving Molly's playhouse across the farm and ridding the Old West town of a bee infestation.
42	21	"A Matt on a Mission"	December 23, 2006
A dwarf advocacy group founded by Matt assists a couple with the adoption of a dwarf.
43	22	"Farm Overload"	December 23, 2006
Roloff Farms becomes overwhelmed selling pumpkins, and Matt celebrates his 45th birthday with a visit from an Oregon state congressman. Footage of Jacob and Mike's accident with the trebuchet is included.

=== Season 3 (2007) ===
No. overall	No. in season	Title	Original release date
44	1	"Trebuchet Trouble"	April 8, 2007
On the last day of pumpkin season, Jacob Roloff, and family friend Mike Detjen are injured by a pumpkin-launching trebuchet.
45	2	"Accident Aftermath"	April 8, 2007
While Jacob and Mike recover from their injuries, Matt deals with media interest in the accident.
46	3	"Safety First"	April 16, 2007
Matt hires an engineering consultant to assess the safety of the farm's attractions. Matt's father Ron is involved in a serious car accident.
47	4	"While Matt's Away"	April 16, 2007
Before leaving for a convention, Matt plots a surprise birthday party for Amy and Molly.
48	5	"Big Matt on Campus"	April 23, 2007
Matt makes a motivational speech at a Pennsylvania college.
49	6	"Drive Me Crazy"	April 23, 2007
The twins become old enough to get their driver's licenses.
50	7	"The Twin's Big Play"	April 30, 2007
Zach gives high-school soccer another shot. Jeremy learns he did not make the Olympic Development soccer team.
51	8	"Of Moles And Men (Lost Episode)"	April 30, 2007
This "lost" episode rewinds to the end of summer 2005. Jeremy and Matt embark on a 'dirty' showdown with a pesky mole that's determined to wreak havoc on the Roloff's lawn. Jacob's feet also 'reek' their own mayhem on the family, and require some immediate parental attention from Matt.
52	9	"The Men's Crisis Center"	May 7, 2007
Matt turns a barn into a men's crisis center. Matt finds his childhood diary.
53	10	"That’s Agri-tainment!"	May 7, 2007
Matt hatches a scheme to raise cash by having truckloads of soil dumped on the farm, but an all-day caravan of dust and noise has Amy outraged. Still, when Matt shares his grand plan for the farm, Amy can't help but admire his passions and vision.
54	11	"Jacob's Got Game"	May 14, 2007
Jacob's new bad attitude causes frustration for Amy. Matt and Jeremy take Rocky to the Vet.
55	12	"Amy’s Work Is Never Done (Lost Episode)"	May 14, 2007
While Amy is busy juggling her kids' events, working 2 jobs, and doing her chores at home, she is suddenly taxed with finding host families for three visiting soccer coaches. Meanwhile, Matt impulsively decides to clean the house from top to bottom.
56	13	"Zach's New Ride"	May 21, 2007
An inventive bicycle designer custom builds Zach a bike that allows him to keep up with his average-height brother.
57	14	"Halloween Harvest Hustle (Lost Episode)"	May 21, 2007
With just 1 week before Halloween, Matt decides to throw an impromptu Harvest Party to promote his pumpkin business. When Matt tries to enlist the Roloff kids' support for the idea, Zach storms off, annoyed by Matt's haphazard, last-minute planning.
58	15	"The Storm Before the Storm"	May 28, 2007
Amy takes Zach to a surgeon who will perform an operation to correct his bowed legs. A major storm hits the farm, causing a lot of damage and kills the power.
59	16	"Final Prep"	May 28, 2007
The Family heads the Oakland, California for Zach's knee surgery. Matt tries to help Zach calm down before the operation.
60	17	"A Little Surgery"	June 4, 2007
Zach's whole family gathers in Oakland for his knee surgery.
61	18	"Marty Comes to Town"	June 4, 2007
Marty visits the farm to cheer Zach up.
62	19	"Room For Improvement"	June 11, 2007
Matt begins remodeling the kid's bedrooms.
63	20	"Jake Turns Ten"	June 11, 2007
Jacob turns ten and Matt's friend Sphen paints his room for his birthday.
64	21	"Roloffs in the Snow"	June 18, 2007
The kids have a snow day, but Zach cannot play in the snow because of his cast.
65	22	"A Tale of Two Trips"	June 18, 2007
Amy and Zach fly down to Oakland, California to get Zach's cast off.
66	23	"Too Fast, Too Soon"	June 25, 2007
After Zach gets his cast off, he does physical therapy. But when he thinks it is okay to run, his leg begins hurting.
67	24	"Road Scholar"	June 25, 2007
Matt buys a 1968 Camaro for Jeremy to fix up if he can get his grades up.
68	25	"Matt's Project-Palooza"	July 2, 2007
Matt has a lot of projects going on at one time. The men's crisis center is complete.
69	26	"Big Deal, Big Deadline"	July 2, 2007
Microtel Inns and Hawthorn Suites order 400 of Matt's little people accessibility kits.
70	27	"Viva Little Vegas"	July 9, 2007
Jeremy agrees to help complete the rest of the farm's remodel in exchange for something else from his parents; Amy receives an invitation from Central Michigan University, where she went to school, to give a speech to the students. So Matt and Amy go to a speaking conference in Las Vegas.
71	28	"Amy's College Homecoming"	July 9, 2007
Amy has trouble getting ready for her speech at Central Michigan University with all the excitement going on around the farm, and she is nervous about the talk as she travels to the school. Amy reminisces about her time in college.
72	29	"Roloffs & Rollercoasters"	July 16, 2007
The family takes a trip to the theme park Knott's Berry Farm in California for a fun vacation, but Zach is disappointed to learn he won't be able to ride all of the roller coasters with the other kids because of his shunt.
73	30	"Zach Doesn't Dance/Phun in Phoenix"	July 16, 2007
The family travels to a regional Little People conference in Phoenix, while Jeremy stays home. Some of Zach's LP friends break a patio table at the hotel.
74	101 (Special)	"Roloffs On Rewind"	June 18, 2007
Previously unaired interviews with the family highlight this retrospective of the first season.
75	102 (Special)	"The Roloffs Remember"	June 18, 2007
The Roloffs look back on the previous year and comment on the changes to the farm and family.

=== Season 4 (2007) ===
No. overall	No. in season	Title	Original release date
76	1	"Twins at Seventeen"	October 15, 2007
Both the twins, Jeremy and Zach, have trouble completing their school year academically; and after receiving their report cards, they realize they both made Fs in math; the twins' failing grades mean they must attend summer school.
77	2	"Roloff Road Trip: Yosemite"	October 15, 2007
Their oversized RV is barely out of their own driveway and the Roloff’s family trip has already found trouble.
78	3	"Roloff Road Trip: Grand Canyon"	October 22, 2007
The Roloffs continue their trip across country in an RV and their next stop is Death Valley, California which can reach temperatures of 128-degrees; during the journey Amy and the kids wonder what Matt was thinking when he did his planning.
79	4	"Roloffs & Red Rocks"	October 22, 2007
The family splits up for special activities on their trip as they continue their journey in the RV while the boys take off for excitement on the famous Route 66, Amy and Molly take some time to relax in the beautiful town of Sedona, Arizona.
80	5	"Homeward Bound"	October 29, 2007
The Roloffs finish their road trip by revisiting their family roots in California.
81	6	"Garden Up, Barn Down"	October 29, 2007
Back home, it's planting season, and while Matt sees to the seeding of their major pumpkin and corn crops, Amy and Molly are assisted by Grandma Peg in starting a family vegetable garden.
82	7	"DAAA Games: Amy vs. Zach"	November 5, 2007
Enough time has passed since his leg surgery that Zach now feels he can compete in this year's Dwarf Athletic Association of America Games.
83	8	"The Rematch: Marty vs. Zach"	November 5, 2007
In this year's DAAA Games, Zach's soccer team has a rematch with the L.A. Breakers, led by actor Marty.
84	9	"Kicking into Gear"	November 12, 2007
Matt custom modifies his red Volkswagen bug.
85	10	"Jeremy Gets Swamped"	November 12, 2007
Jeremy and Zach construct a "swamp fort" in a wooded area of the farm.
86	11	"Little People Weekend"	November 19, 2007
Zach invites three of his friends over for a fun weekend.
87	12	"A Little Competition"	November 19, 2007
Zach's Little People Weekend continues with he and his three dwarf friends concluding a paintball war with Jeremy and his standard-height friends.
88	13	"Paducah"	November 26, 2007
When Matt takes a trip to Paducah, Kentucky, to give a motivational talk, he brings the family's history buffs Zach and Molly along so that they can learn about the American Civil War.
89	14	"Passport to the Bahamas"	November 26, 2007
The Roloffs rush to get passports for their family vacation in the Bahamas Islands, which commences with a sightseeing trip by sailboat.
90	15	"Roloffs on the Water"	December 3, 2007
While on vacation in the Bahamas, Jeremy discovers he has a knack for sailing.
91	16	"Roloffs on the Beach"	December 3, 2007
The Roloffs connect with the culture of the Bahamas.
92	17	"A Matter of Matt's Health"	December 10, 2007
Amy takes Matt to a doctor's appointment where they discover that he has Type 2 Diabetes and Sleep Apnea.
93	18	"In Too Deep"	December 10, 2007
Matt promises the new pool will be done for Molly's birthday party.
94	19	"In The Swim"	December 17, 2007
Matt hopes to complete the new swimming pool before Molly's birthday, but is interrupted when he receives a phone call saying that Jacob is in the hospital with another head injury.
95	20	"License to Drive"	December 17, 2007
The twins take the final tests to get their driver's licenses, but Zach approaches it with much less confidence in his abilities than Jeremy. Meanwhile, Amy struggles to accept the fact of the boys' increasing independence.

=== Season 5 (2008) ===
No. overall	No. in season	Title	Original release date
96	1	"Before the Trial"	March 3, 2008
As the third season begins, Matt goes to court to learn the date of his upcoming DUI trial, and works with Amy to prepare his defense. Later, he meets with his attorney.
97	2	"Matt on Trial"	March 3, 2008
Matt's DUI trial begins and the arresting officer testifies against him; Matt frets about his chances and prepares to take the stand.
98	3	"The Verdict"	March 10, 2008
Matt gets his turn on the stand in his DUI trial and faces an intense cross-examination by the prosecutor, but the jury can't reach a unanimous agreement after hours of deliberation.
99	4	"Three Dates"	March 10, 2008
Matt plans a surprise dinner for Amy to celebrate their 20th wedding anniversary. Meanwhile, Jeremy marks a year of dating his girlfriend Kirsten, and Zach begins his first romantic relationship with an average-height girl.
100	5	"Sawmill Someday"	March 17, 2008
Matt wants to remodel his Indian Village attraction on the farm and enlists Native Americans to assist in constructing an authentic cedar-plank house; Molly leads her school's flag team in a parade.
101	6	"Tribal Gathering"	March 17, 2008
Matt and a friend plan to build a sawmill with a waterwheel, but they find themselves disagreeing. Meanwhile, the boys get to work running water to the mill.
102	7	"Pumpkin Season Shove-Off"	March 24, 2008
Matt and Amy plan to go on a little-people cruise during the first week of pumpkin season, and tensions rise as the family prepares for them to leave.
103	8	"Cruisin' for a Bruisin'"	March 24, 2008
While Matt and Amy are away on a cruise, pumpkin season at the farm is in chaos.
104	9	"Managing Molly"	March 31, 2008
Matt and Amy find themselves frustrated with Molly's behavior when she shows up late for work in the pumpkin patch, and her attitude stinks. Matt and Amy try to show her that everyone's role on the farm is important for the family.
105	10	"Trick or Trebuchet?"	March 31, 2008
Matt makes some new designs in the trebuchet in hopes of making it as safe as it can possibly be, and Jacob and Mike D. help out on the project. The family remembers the accident that injured Jacob and Mike D. one year ago.
106	11	"Girls and Boys"	April 7, 2008
In order to spend some time alone, Molly and Amy go on a trip to Victoria, British Columbia where they get to watch some whales in the water. Zach and Dani, the girl that he likes from school, finally go on their first date together.
107	12	"Mid Term Madness"	April 7, 2008
Amy is forced to do something drastic when she learns Jeremy has been consistently late for school in the morning. Jeremy and Zach face punishment when Matt and Amy discover they aren't doing as well in their classes as they should be.
108	13	"Bright Ideas"	April 14, 2008
Amy and Matt decide to send Zach and Jeremy to a special learning center to help them get their grades up, but it's not an easy transition for them. Jeremy impresses the whole family when he begins work on his own hovercraft.
109	14	"Rob's Surgery"	April 14, 2008
A friend of the Roloffs heads into the operating room for an important spinal surgery associated with his dwarfism that has some serious risks involved. Matt takes a trip to California to see how he is following his time under the knife.
110	15	"Roloffs Reach Out"	April 21, 2008
Matt and a friend participate in a project to create community little-people awareness. Jeremy, Zach and their friends join in a relief effort to help flood victims.
111	16	"New Addition"	April 21, 2008
Matt starts an ambitious remodel of the Roloff house, but it proves to be more than his abilities can manage.
112	17	"Point of No Return"	April 28, 2008
The Roloff family must all live together in the den while home remodeling is done.
113	18	"A Formal First"	April 28, 2008
Zach and Jeremy attend a high-school winter formal dance with their dates. Amy departs for a motivational speech.
114	19	"Amy's Outreach"	May 5, 2008
At a college in Iowa, Amy enjoys some winter fun with students before giving a motivational speech.
115	20	"Addition Impossible"	May 5, 2008
Matt's home renovation gets out of control, and the family complains about the condition of the house.
116	21	"Risky Business (Lost Episode)"	May 12, 2008
Matt Roloff shows his kids what competition is all about as he challenges them to do battle with him in the board game Risk. Though not yet a licensed driver, Jeremy gets his vintage pickup truck ready for the day he can drive it on his own.
117	22	"Girls, Girls, Girls (Lost Episode)"	May 12, 2008
Zach is caught off guard when 2 female LP friends arrive unexpectedly on the farm. As he struggles to find things to do with them, it's clear that Zach is not quite a lady's man. Amy takes Molly, Jacob and their friends to a blustery day at the beach.
118	23	"Summer of ’06 (Lost Episode)"	May 19, 2008
Even though the water's cold, Molly and Jacob can't resist jumping into their pool in the first days of summer, but soon their horseplay results in Jacob getting hurt. Infected with summer laziness, the rest of the kids are slow to help with chores.
119	24	"Growing Up Molly (Lost Episode)"	May 19, 2008
All the colors of Molly begin to shine. She's independent, ignoring the Roloff boys' soccer tradition, she begins another season of volleyball. She's motivating - she convinces the rest of the family to help her study Russian and plant a garden.
120	25	"The Boys of Summer (Lost Episode)"	May 26, 2008
Along with their friends, twins Zach and Jeremy keep getting distracted as they struggle to complete their Swamp Fort - the project ultimately leads to an all-out paintball attack on the fort. Meanwhile, Matt installs an athletic court on the farm.
121	26	"My Life as a Dog/Rocky: MY Life As A Dog (Lost Episode)"	May 26, 2008
Although he's often wimpy, needy and smelly, the Roloffs' bull mastiff dog Rocky is a much-loved member of the family. The Roloffs in turn each share special moments with Rocky - and they all rally together with concern when he's injured.

=== Season 6 (2008) ===
No. overall	No. in season	Title	Original release date
122	1	"Operation Iraq: Part 1"	October 13, 2008
When Matt Roloff learns of dwarf children in Iraq who need medical intervention, he makes the difficult, dangerous journey into Baghdad to find the family, befriend them, and get photos and x-rays to bring back to America for evaluation.
123	2	"Operation Iraq: Part 2"	October 13, 2008
When Matt Roloff learns of dwarf children in Iraq who need medical intervention, he makes the difficult, dangerous journey into Baghdad to find the family, befriend them, and get photos and x-rays to bring back to America for evaluation.
124	3	"The Heat Is On"	October 20, 2008
Matt decides to install a geothermal heating system on the farm to heat the house and save energy and money.
125	4	"Happy Campers"	October 20, 2008
Jeremy and Zach go on a camping trip with their friends, and Molly holds a sleepover in their Native American plank house.
126	5	"Nashville Blues"	October 27, 2008
Amy and Matt travel to Nashville, Tennessee to speak at the KFC national convention. Matt struggles through illness during the trip, while the kids fend for themselves on the farm.
127	6	"Zach's Charge"	October 27, 2008
Zach attempts to improve his grades, which includes producing an extra-credit film on the Civil War for History class.
128	7	"Matt's Big Gamble"	November 3, 2008
Matt ups the ante for his stool kit business DAS by taking Amy and a group of their little people friends to a Las Vegas hotel convention. Back at the farm, an overflowing toilet means chaos for the kids.
129	8	"What Happens on the Farm…"	November 3, 2008
While Matt and Amy are in Vegas having a blast with their little people friends, the Roloff kids are on their own. Although Jacob is being a pesky little brother, his twin brothers encourage him to grow up by taking him along for an adventurous hike.
130	9	"What The Deck?"	November 10, 2008
Matt takes the Roloff remodel outside and hires his old buddy Romi to build a new deck. Arguments with Amy flare up when Matt continues to make last-minute changes. Amid the construction chaos, Amy tries to focus on her preschool class graduation.
131	10	"License Revoked"	November 10, 2008
With money he's saved, Jeremy buys an old, broken-down car to fix up. But after he and Zach are busted for off-road "mudding" with their cars and breaking state law by driving with an underage passenger, Matt and Amy suspend the twins' driving privileges.
132	11	"Can't Win 'em All"	November 17, 2008
When Zach and Jeremy's school soccer team goes on a losing streak, Matt and Amy struggle to teach the twins life lessons in responsibility and perseverance. But on the sidelines, Amy's competitive nature erupts.
133	12	"Keep It Together"	November 17, 2008
The upheaval of the Roloff remodel is at an all-time high. As stress takes its toll on the family, Matt announces his plan to move his business office into the house — adding to the chaos — and Amy worries that she's lost control of her household.
134	13	"Addition Accomplished"	November 24, 2008
After over 6 months of work, the latest Roloff remodel is in the final stages. Tired of the family living on top of one another in 2 rooms, Amy has run out of patience with Matt's constant additions and changes. Jeremy crashes into the new garage door.
135	14	"Escape to Orlando"	November 24, 2008
With the remodel finally behind them, the Roloffs go to Orlando for a much-needed escape. Amy leads the charge to get the family into vacation mode, but it takes more than belly-dancing, alligator catching and grub-worm eating to loosen Zach up.
136	15	"The Bug Is Back"	December 1, 2008
Now that their old, yellow Volkswagen Beetle has been overhauled at a body shop. Matt takes Zach and Jeremy on a road trip to trailer it home. For Matt and his oldest sons, it's a journey of male bonding, discovery and discomfort.
137	16	"Surprising Amy"	December 1, 2008
Amy visits a little people friend in Napa, California, where she speaks at a local church group for Mother's Day. Back home, Matt tries to organize a big surprise for her: a gazebo built on her favorite spot on the farm.
138	17	"Twins At Eighteen"	December 8, 2008
Zach and Jeremy have reached adulthood-sort of. They're 18, but they don't seem ready to leave the nest. Amy prepares a pool party for the twins, but when Matt drags his feet on getting the pool in working order, the whole party is put in jeopardy.
139	18	"Big Sister, Little Brother"	December 8, 2008
Amy joins her siblings in Taos, New Mexico to celebrate her sister's birthday. They ride horses, raft whitewater rapids and experience a Native American sweat lodge, but the fun grinds to a halt when the chaos at the farm finds its way back to Amy.
140	19	"A Roloff Winterland: Part 1"	December 15, 2008
It's been over 2 years since both Matt and Amy's families got together, so they invite the Knights and the Roloffs to the farm for an early holiday celebration. Amy attempts to deck the halls and transform their home into a "Roloff Winterland".
141	20	"A Roloff Winterland: Part 2"	December 15, 2008
Matt and Amy's families gather for their holiday celebration. Coordinating a meal for 25 guests is a lot to manage. The family get-together includes Matt's brother Sam (a little person), Amy's parents Gordon and Pat, and a guest appearance by Santa.
142	21	"Friend of the Family"	December 22, 2008
Family friend Mike Detjen is as involved with the Roloff family as he's ever been: building a new trebuchet, coaching the twins' soccer team. But when a heart condition suddenly takes Mike's life, the family must face coping with the loss of their friend.
143	22	"Death in the Family"	December 22, 2008
In the aftermath of losing their dear friend Mike Detjen, the Roloff family recalls his special place in their lives. They prepare for his funeral and turn an already planned housewarming party into an emotional get-together to honor his memory.

=== Season 7 (2009) ===
No. overall	No. in season	Title	Original release date
144	1	"Back to Iraq: Part 1"	February 15, 2009
Matt and an orthopedic surgeon return to the Middle East to perform leg straightening operations on Ali and Bara'a, two of the dwarf children Matt met on his first trip to Iraq.
145	2	"Back to Iraq: Part 2"	February 15, 2009
Matt and an orthopedic surgeon return to the Middle East to perform leg straightening operations on Ali and Bara'a, two of the dwarf children Matt met on his first trip to Iraq.
146	3	"The Graduate"	February 23, 2009
Matt and Amy's great expectations are realized when Molly is named valedictorian of her 8th grade class. But Amy has her hands full when Molly refuses to give a speech and picks a graduation dress that violates the school dress code.
147	4	"Michigan Knights"	February 23, 2009
Amy takes the kids to visit her family, the Knights, in Michigan. Amy's father, Gordon, takes his grandkids hiking in the woods but the idyllic scene turns to chaos when Jacob gets a tick, and no one seems to know how to get rid of it.
148	5	"Somewhere in Time"	March 2, 2009
Continuing their visit with relatives in Michigan, Amy takes the children to see the house she grew up in and tearfully recalls her decision to leave Michigan to start a new life in Oregon.
149	6	"Where It All Began"	March 2, 2009
The Roloffs travel to Detroit to attend the Little People of America National Conference, an event where Matt and Amy met during a Motor City Micronauts basketball game 22 years earlier.
150	7	"Here Come the Hogkillers"	March 9, 2009
Zach and his soccer team, the Grasshogs, face a tough and talented opponent in the Dwarf Athletic Association of America tournament championship game.
151	8	"Roloffs on the River"	March 9, 2009
Amy realizes a longtime dream by taking her family on a riverboat cruise on the Mississippi. Matt must rush home to take care of urgent farm matters, leaving Amy and the children wondering whether he'll be back before the trip ends.
152	9	"Troubled Waters"	March 16, 2009
Matt wants to just relax and hang out on the riverboat during the family's cruise, but Amy pushes for them to seek new adventures and make the most of every moment during their vacation.
153	10	"Southern Comfort"	March 16, 2009
After the riverboat cruise ends, Matt returns home while Amy takes charge of the final days of the family vacation during a road trip through the South to New Orleans.
154	11	"Roloffs in Relief"	March 23, 2009
After a long vacation, Amy wants the family to give something back by helping to repair a storm-damaged house and build new homes in Biloxi, Mississippi.
155	12	"A Bridge Too Near"	March 23, 2009
Amy worries that Matt will forget their anniversary as he embarks on creating his most ambitious farm attraction ever: a long and curvy bridge that slopes from the highest point on the farm down to the treehouse.
156	13	"Who's In Charge?"	March 30, 2009
Now that the twins are 18, Matt and Amy finally feel they can take a trip and leave them in charge — sort of. After giving the kids a long list of rules and stern warnings, Matt and Amy go to Hawaii with their friends, Rob and Amy Haines.
157	14	"Big Twins on Campus"	March 30, 2009
Zach and Jeremy are having a hard time balancing their social life with academics in their senior year. The twins help pack the house when their buddy's band performs at a local coffee shop, but they can't seem to cram in enough study time for the SAT.
158	15	"Driving Miss Molly"	April 6, 2009
Upon turning 15, Molly focuses on getting her driver's permit; Molly's chances of passing the driver exam seem ill-fated when Jeremy takes her for a driving lesson and they run out of gas, then a ride with Amy goes awry.
159	16	"On The Road Again (Lost Episode)"	April 6, 2009
The Roloffs recall their RV road trip from the Summer of '07, with never-before-seen moments and a new look at some of the trip's highlights: including an Old West gunfight, beach fun in San Diego, a pit stop, and a scary fireside ghost story.
160	17	"Space Jake"	April 13, 2009
Amy and Jake Roloff visit the U.S. Space and Rocket Center in Huntsville, Alabama where Jacob attends Space Camp. Also in the episode is a visit to Florence, AL where Helen Keller's house is visited.
161	18	"Of Mud And Management (Lost Episode)"	April 13, 2009
The pumpkin season of 2007 was a stressful time on Roloff Farms. Matt and Amy went on vacation, missing the first week of business. Mat left an assistant in charge, but it didn't take long for the family to run afoul of their new boss.
162	19	"Try, Try, Trebuchet"	April 20, 2009
Still coping with the loss of his friend and business partner, Mike Detjen, Matt decides to complete their last big project together: the new and improved trebuchet. Matt hopes to finish it in honor of his late friend.
163	20	"Reaching Jacob (Lost Episode)"	April 20, 2009
For Matt and Amy, Jacob has always been their most challenging child. He's a good student and soccer player, but acts out, sulks and annoys his siblings. When Jake uses profanity in front of Amy, she comes up with a creative way to discipline him.
164	21	"Biggest Season Ever?"	April 27, 2009
Expecting to break every attendance record, Matt makes big investments in preparation for the new pumpkin season. But when opening day brings just a handful of visitors, Matt wonders if he's made a huge mistake.
165	22	"The Secret Lives Of Teenage Twins (Lost Episode)"	April 27, 2009
Back when the Roloff twins were still Juniors, they were all about having fun. Amy tries to instill some basic skills like cooking, but the twins are too busy thinking about dating, driving and getting tattoos.
166	23	"The Tractor and the Tortoise/The Tortoise And The Scare"	May 4, 2009
Pumpkin season gets underway, but when Zach has a near-catastrophic tractor accident on the same day that Jeremy is promoted to tractor supervisor, tensions build between the twins. Meanwhile, a giant tortoise named Ferdinand escapes the new petting zoo.
167	24	"Memories Of Iraq (Lost Episode)"	May 4, 2009
Matt recalls his 2 trips to Iraq, where he and Dr. Hoffinger gave much-needed medical aid to an Iraqi family's dwarf children. Matt interacts with soldiers, dines with a Sheik and receives an honorary commission from the U.S. Army.
168	25	"Matt Maxed Out"	May 11, 2009
This pumpkin season turns out to be the biggest ever for Roloff Farms. Facing capacity crowds, Matt tries to supervise his oversized and inexperienced staff, and finds that his micro-managing only serves to create more stress for everyone — especially him.
169	26	"Roughing It (Lost Episode)"	May 11, 2009
In the fall of 2005, the Roloff men went on a camping adventure in the Oregon wilderness, while Molly and Amy stayed home for some girl time. This fresh look at unseen moments recalls a time when life was simpler for the Roloffs.

=== Season 8 (2009-10) ===
No. overall	No. in season	Title	Original release date
170	1	"King of His Castle?"	October 12, 2009
Ten years after he began building Molly's Castle, Matt is dead set on completing what's become his most drawn-out and costly farm attraction. Amy begrudgingly approves until Matt's budget on the project begins to swell.
171	2	"Last Dance"	October 12, 2009
Amy helps Molly get ready for her first high school formal dance, but it's a bittersweet experience because it's also Zach and Jeremy's last.
172	3	"Downhill Dwarf"	October 19, 2009
Matt takes Jeremy skiing against Amy's wishes.
173	4	"Game Over?"	October 19, 2009
Zach scrambles to improve his grades before the soccer season ends.
174	5	"School of Hard Knocks"	October 26, 2009
Amy takes the twins to visit a college, and they learn they are behind on applying and being accepted into schools.
175	6	"A House Divided"	October 26, 2009
Amy encourages Matt to organize the basement so the kids can have their friends over in their newly remodeled house.
176	7	"Zach's First Stand"	November 2, 2009
Matt plans a Caribbean sailing vacation for a week Amy can't take off from work, so Zach leads a mutiny against him.
177	8	"No Matt Is an Island"	November 2, 2009
Matt's travels to the British Virgin Islands to go sailing with Jeremy, Jacob, Papa Ron and two buddies, but his increasing lack of mobility leaves him on the sidelines.
178	9	"Texting 1, 2, 3"	November 9, 2009
Jacob gets a cell phone for his 12th birthday from Amy and Matt, but they question whether or not he is really ready for the responsibility after he racks up an outrageous bill with over 8,000 text messages.
179	10	"Coach Zach"	November 9, 2009
Zach works at Jacob's soccer camp to pursue his coaching aspirations, but begins wonders if he's got what it takes.
180	11	"Mother's Day?"	November 16, 2009
Matt announces that he's going to Hawaii alone during Mother's Day weekend, which happens to be the same weekend as the twins' 19th birthday, leaving everyone in shock.
181	12	"Making the Grade"	November 16, 2009
Molly fails a test that puts her perfect 4.0 GPA at risk, and in an effort to master Spanish, stops speaking English. The twins' visit a local university, but their academic problems make it seem pointless.
182	13	"Little Slickers"	November 30, 2009
Matt, Amy and all the kids rough it on a Utah dude ranch; Cattle-drives and a fun poker game add to the excitement, and everyone waits to see whether or not Matt will get on a horse.
183	14	"Unhappy Trails"	November 30, 2009
Matt decides to leave the trip early, even though there's lots of dude ranch fun yet in store, leaving Amy to finish another vacation alone with the kids.
184	15	"Amy On Her Own"	December 7, 2009
Amy speaks at a charity fundraiser and golf tournament in Florida. She then volunteers for a relief organization and visits a children's home.
185	16	"Little Americans"	December 14, 2009
The Salman family is escorted by Matt out of Baghdad to Washington, D.C., and Roloff Farms; the Iraqi immigrants experience a cultural whirlwind while seeking lifesaving surgeries for their children.
186	17	"Married at Mid-Life"	December 21, 2009
Matt slips into mid-life crisis, even though his and Amy's relationship is continuing to deteriorate. His spending goes over the top and he buys two Mercedes sedans at a time when he's still paying off their big home remodel.
187	18	"Zach's Ear"	January 4, 2010
Zach learns he needs ear surgery after months of increasing problems with his hearing, but what begins as a short and simple procedure, becomes a lengthy reconstruction of Zach's eardrum.
188	19	"Diploma Drama"	January 11, 2010
Amy and Matt's families gather for the twins' pre-graduation party. Jeremy makes the honor roll; however, Zach's report card includes a failing grade, which could put his diploma in jeopardy. The twins visit Portland Community College.
189	20	"Pomp and Circumstance"	January 18, 2010
It's a 19-year milestone as the Roloff twins graduate from high school. Zach is uncertain about what his future holds, but he approaches this transition with maturity.

=== Season 9 (2010) ===
No. overall	No. in season	Title	Original release date
190	1	"Twins Go Commando"	April 5, 2010
After years of growing apart, twins Zach and Jeremy try to reconnect during their first trip to Europe and go backpacking in Scotland.
191	2	"Amsterdammed"	April 5, 2010
The twins have fun in London, but in Amsterdam, their personalities clash and a visit to the city's red light district causes friction.
192	3	"Roman Roloffs"	April 12, 2010
Molly gets sick while flying to Italy with Amy and Jake. Zach and Jeremy encounter a language barrier in a small town in Germany.
193	4	"Brothers in Bavaria"	April 12, 2010
While traveling through Bavaria without a plan, Zach and Jeremy ride a tram to the top of Germany's tallest peak and make an eye-opening visit to the Dachau concentration camp; Amy, Jake and Molly travel from Rome to Pisa in Italy.
194	5	"The Burgermeister's Daughter"	April 19, 2010
After Zach and Jeremy get lost in a small town on the edge of the Black Forest, the mayor's daughter invites them to spend the night; Molly, Amy and Jake take sights in Italy ranging from Florence to Venice.
195	6	"Vive La Roloff"	April 19, 2010
The Roloffs reunite in Nice, France, and take a train north to Paris; Matt overbooks their schedule and Roloff chaos erupts on the streets of Paris.
196	7	"Field of Schemes"	April 26, 2010
Under the guise of preparing for an LP soccer camp, Matt goes on a project frenzy — building a huge locker room and a mini Grand Canyon on the farm. Matt tries to sneak his schemes past Amy, who watches him like a hawk.
197	8	"War of the World Games"	April 26, 2010
Matt appoints himself as manager of Zach's soccer team for the World Dwarf Games. Tension builds when Matt and Amy disagree about team sponsorship, jeopardizing her position as a Dwarf Athletic Association board member.
198	9	"The Statesmen"	May 3, 2010
After Zach's soccer team gathers at the farm to train for the World Dwarf Games in Belfast, Matt stuns his son by announcing he won't be traveling with the team to Northern Ireland.
199	10	"Belfast and Furious"	May 3, 2010
With Matt skipping the opening days of the World Dwarf Games in Belfast, Amy is pushed to her limits trying to juggle the roles of coach, player, manager and mother.
200	11	"Full Court Stress"	May 10, 2010
Zach's basketball team vies for a gold medal at the World Dwarf Games; a health scare sends one of Zach's teammates to a hospital.
201	12	"Going for Gold"	May 10, 2010
Zach struggles to get his team focused on winning the soccer tournament at the World Dwarf Games. The team's gold medal hopes rest on Zach during a shootout.
202	13	"Par for the Course"	May 17, 2010
Amy decides to learn how to play golf and organize a golf tournament fundraiser for the Dwarf Athletic Association; Matt tackles a woodshed project.
203	14	"Going, Going, Gone"	May 17, 2010
Amy's fundraising leadership skills are pushed to the limit by logistical nightmares and personal meltdowns
204	15	"In The Hole"	May 24, 2010
Amy struggles to balance being a wife, mother and philanthropist with her golf tournament fundraiser facing financial failure.
205	16	"Fort-A-Thon"	May 24, 2010
Matt stages a "Fort-A-Thon" for disadvantaged children at the farm while hoping to inspire his own children to get off the couch and get outdoors.
206	17	"Dwarfs in Space"	May 31, 2010
Zach and Amy kick off the first LP Space Camp. Zach has trouble embracing a leadership role
207	18	"Molly's Sweet Sixteen"	May 31, 2010
Matt and Amy plan separate celebrations for Molly's birthday. Molly struggles with her driving test.
208	19	"Clash With the County"	June 7, 2010
A county inspector threatens to shut down the farm before the start of pumpkin season.
209	20	"Twin Takeover"	June 7, 2010
Matt and Amy are concerned about the twins' lack of motivation in college. Matt turns the management of Roloff Farms over to the twins at the height of pumpkin season. Matt collapses at his desk in the final seconds of the episode after numerous references about how he "wouldn't be around much longer."

=== Season 10 (2010-12) ===
No. overall	No. in season	Title	Original release date
210	1	"Little Pain, Little Gain"	September 6, 2010
After Matt suffers a vertigo collapse he realizes he has to do something about his health; Amy gets checked out and discovers she is clinically obese.
211	2	"Everything Must Go!"	September 6, 2010
Matt decides to have a garage sale but the whole family resists.
212	3	"All Talked Out"	September 13, 2010
Amy and Matt's public speaking schedule takes a toll on the family; with Amy on the road, it throws the family off balance.
213	4	"On the Road with Matt and Zach"	September 13, 2010
Matt takes Zach on a road trip in hopes of mending their relationship.
214	5	"Camp Roloff"	September 20, 2010
The boys go camping and face a snow-in and gasoline fire, while the girls battle broken cameras and seasickness on their trip to the Oregon coast.
215	6	"Zach Rides On"	September 20, 2010
Zach is offered a job that causes him to address his dwarfism in new ways; making important decisions.
216	7	"Matt's Massacre"	September 27, 2010
Following his dreams, Matt puts together a cast and crew to make a movie about a spooky pumpkin farm.
217	8	"Micromanager Matt"	October 4, 2010
Matt tries to help Amy and Jeremy on a couple projects, but is met with a mountain of resistance.
218	9	"Rocky's Last Stand"	October 18, 2010
While the Roloffs worry about Rocky's health, Rocky has his hands full when the Roloff cats move in on his turf.
219	10	"Little Noah"	October 25, 2010
Matt transports a replica of Noah's Ark onto the farm, Amy is against the attraction but she defends the project and property against a trespassing government official.
220	11	"Get Off My Turf"	November 1, 2010
Amy and Matt disagree about what land Amy can use for her garden. Matt thinks that bees are the secret to pumpkin success.
221	12	"Dating Daze"	November 8, 2010
Zach takes a dating class; the family wonders if Molly would like a boy.
222	13	"Take a Hike"	November 15, 2010
Amy's quest to improve her health hits new heights when she trains hard for an adventurous hike up a mountain with her twin sons. Meanwhile, the whole family chips in to provide Jacob with a boost in confidence.
223	14	"Amy In Command?"	November 15, 2010
Amy hopes to guide her charity foundation to greatness, but when her board members find themselves at odds with one another, her leadership skills are called into question. Can she pull it together in time for this year's big fundraiser?
224	15	"Little Brother, Big Sister/Big Brother, Little Sister"	November 22, 2010
Jeremy is inspired by his uncle Sam; Molly tries to balance all of the activities she has taken on.
225	16	"Giving Back"	November 22, 2010
Matt launches a bicycle donation program. Amy and the boys head to Haiti to provide relief for earthquake victims.
226	17	"Ask the Roloffs: Farm Life"	November 29, 2010
The Roloffs answer frequently asked questions about their life on the farm.
227	18	"Ask the Roloffs: One By One"	November 29, 2010
Each member of the Roloff family answers questions about their personal experiences over the past five years.
228	19	"Twins at Twenty"	December 6, 2010
Zach puts off buying a new car. Jeremy has trouble getting a job.
229	20	"Moving Out"	December 6, 2010
The twins work on getting their own apartment. Matt and Amy consider selling the farm. *Original Series Finale
230	101	"Big Changes (Special)"	October 2, 2011
The family deals with a dramatic change; one of the twins moves away from the farm and goes to another state; Amy and Matt come to terms with the state of their marriage and the future of Roloff.
231	102	"Holiday Surprise (Special)"	December 11, 2011
During pumpkin season, the Roloff family and staff of Roloff Farms surprise Matt on his 50th birthday.
232	103	"Zach’s New Love/Zach’s First Love (Special)"	January 20, 2012
Matt and Amy struggle to motivate Zach, but the arrival of a new girlfriend changes Zach's life in immeasurable ways.
233	104	"Battle For The Farm (Special)"	February 19, 2012
Amy's dream of creating her own cookbook is about to be realised when Matt's dream of tripling the size of Roloff farms ignites a dramatic battle over the future of the farm.
234	105	"Amy’s 50th Birthday (Special)"	October 6, 2012
Matt and Amy decide to throw a big bash at the new wedding farm venue to celebrate their 25th wedding anniversary. But the planning is anything but a party when Matt and Amy find themselves at odds over every detail.
235	106	"Down Under (Special)"	September 3, 2012
The family gets together for a trip to Australia.

=== Season 11/Spin-Off: Wedding Farm (2012-13) ===
No. overall	No. in season	Title	Original release date
236	1	"Wedding Farm: A New Chapter"	November 13, 2012
The beloved Roloff family - husband and wife Matt and Amy, and their children Jeremy, Zach, Molly, and Jacob are back. Matt and Amy are making their dreams come true by turning their farm into a wedding venue.
237	2	"Wedding Farm: A Matrimonial Mess"	November 20, 2012
The Roloffs book their first wedding and the whole family pitches in to try to make the event a success. Way behind schedule and dangerously over budget, Matt and Amy are desperate to finish construction on the new property any way they can.
238	3	"Wedding Farm: Molly Moves Out"	November 27, 2012
When Molly moves out, Amy takes her little girl off to college and leaves Matt to manage a wedding event. But when the horse wranglers are late and Matt's farm manager drops the wedding cake, the day turns out to be anything but a fairy tale.
239	4	"Wedding Farm: Big Wedding, Big Problems"	December 4, 2012
Matt and Amy may have bit off more than they can chew when they book a mega-sized wedding. When a thunderstorm brings a torrential downpour and sends everyone running, the Roloffs find out the hard way that the bigger the wedding, the bigger the problems.
240	5	"Wedding Farm: Matt Versus the Volcano"	December 11, 2012
The Roloffs pull out all the stops to transform the farm into Hawaiian paradise for their final wedding of the season. Matt's obsession with creating a flaming volcano proves to be an explosive idea with Amy and when Zach announces a major life change. Note: this episode is missing a scene (depicted as coming up at the end of the previous episode) in which Zach is offered a room at his friends' apartment.
241	6	"Wedding Farm:Matt and Amy's 25th Anniversary"	December 18, 2012
Matt and Amy decide to throw a big bash at the new wedding farm venue to celebrate their 25th wedding anniversary. But the planning is anything but a party when Matt and Amy find themselves at odds over every detail.
242	7	"Conquering Mount St. Helens"	March 9, 2013
Now that three out of their four kids are out of the house, Matt and Amy Roloff seek out new challenges. Amy leaves her comfort zone to attempt a climb up Mount St. Helens, while Matt builds a new one-room schoolhouse for the farm.
243	8	"Separation Anxiety"	June 3, 2013
Matt and Amy have been having a rocky relationship for years now. At times, it seemed they were only staying together for the kids. But with the kids growing up and moving out one by one, they're starting to examine their relationship on a deeper level.
244	9	"Breaking Down The Walls"	June 23, 2013
We rejoin the family as they adjust to life in what has become a three person household. As the only kid still living at home, Jacob is not a fan of his newfound status as the center of attention. Meanwhile, Matt asks Amy for her assistance with a farm project, but she has other plans in mind: seeking a teaching job. While pursuing separate interests seems like a good idea at the time, it does come with its fair share of challenges for the family.
245	10	"Welcome to the Jungle"	June 30, 2013
In this one-hour special, Matt and Amy Roloff attempt to breathe new life into their relationship by embarking on a family trip to Costa Rica. But with each family member having an agenda of their own, it is not exactly the picture perfect reunion the couple was hoping for. With sparks flying and tensions high, one Roloff finds himself separated from the others and stumbling through the jungle alone.

=== Season 12 (2013) ===
No. overall	No. in season	Title	Original release date
246	1	"Playing With Fire"	October 29, 2013
All four Roloff kids are home for the first time in years as the seventh season begins, which will help as wedding season is approaching and the farm needs a lot of work. Meanwhile, Matt hatches a wild scheme; and the family deal with tragic news.
247	2	"Till Death Do Us Part"	November 5, 2013
Tension between Matt and Amy rises as the first wedding approaches, and Matt's carelessness leaves them unprepared when the bride arrives. Meanwhile, Rocky's health continues to decline.
248	3	"Game On"	November 12, 2013
Matt stages the inaugural Family Game Day to get the kids more involved in the farm's activities, and it turns into a spirited competition.
249	4	"Forever Young"	November 19, 2013
Matt champions a prefab home an answer to the Roloff's bridal-suite problem, but having it in place and ready for occupation in time for the next wedding is another matter. Meanwhile, Zach decides he wants to move back home.
250	5	"A Bride and a Bulldozer"	November 26, 2013
A month to plan wedding No. 3 gives the Roloffs time to make it their most memorable ceremony to date, but Matt and Amy's new assistant may turn it into one they'd rather forget.
251	6	"All Tangled Up"	December 3, 2013
Zach asks his dad for advice when a new opportunity arises for Tori and him, but Matt's suggestion that he pay attention to how his parents work together only confuses Zach, who challenges them to spend a whole day side by side.
252	7	"Come Rain or Come Shine"	December 10, 2013
The summer's last wedding demands the Roloffs' attention as pumpkin season is ready to begin, but everything could be put on hold due to rain and Matt's shoulder pain.
253	8	"Crossroads for the Roloffs"	December 17, 2013
The Roloffs deals with change in the family dynamic. Included: Jeremy and Molly return to school; at the same time Zach moves into a new house. Also: A series of catastrophes during pumpkin season push Matt and Amy to their limits and leave them wondering whether they have a future together after 25 years of marriage.

=== Season 13 (2014) ===
No. overall	No. in season	Title	Original release date
254	1	"New Year, Big Changes"	March 25, 2014
It's the holidays and the Roloff Kids are home. But Matt has moved out of the house, hoping the space will allow him and Amy to work through their issues.
255	2	"The Proposal"	September 2, 2014
Jeremy prepares to graduate and thinks about his future with Audrey. Meanwhile, Amy pursues a new business venture.
256	3	"The Family That Plays Together Stays Together"	September 9, 2014
The family go on a ski trip for the weekend in an attempt to repair broken bonds when Matt and Amy's troubles overshadow Jeremy and Audrey's wedding plans.
257	4	"Don't Rain on Our Parade"	September 16, 2014
Pumpkin season's approach inspires an idea to drum up business by entering a float in a local parade. Meanwhile, Jeremy and Audrey are overwhelmed by wedding plans with only a few months to go.
258	5	"Another Roloff Pops the Question"	September 23, 2014
Zach declares he's ready to propose to his girlfriend, Tori, as wedding preparations continue for Jeremy and Audrey.
259	6	"A Roloff Gets Married!"	September 30, 2014
Matt's sudden illness could jeopardize his chances of attending Jeremy and Audrey's wedding as the big day approaches.

=== Season 14 (2015) ===
No. overall	No. in season	Title	Original release date
260	1	"Jeremy's & Audrey's Journey to 'I Do'"	July 7, 2015
Jeremy Roloff married Audrey Botti on his family Farm at the first Roloff wedding. The family reflect on the big day and their love story.
261	101	"The Twins Grow Up (3-hr Special)"	July 13, 2015
Twins Zach and Jeremy recall the most memorable moments of their lives, including their first day of high school, getting their driver's licenses, backpacking through Europe and falling in love.
262	2	"Wedding Prep and a Reality Check"	July 14, 2015
Zach and Tori's wedding is a few months away, and the whole family pitches in to prepare the farm for their nuptials. Meanwhile, Matt and Amy wonder what the future holds for their relationship; and Jacob makes a big announcement.
263	3	"Making Marital Moves"	July 21, 2015
Zach visits Jeremy and Audrey in Los Angeles to learn about married life, while Matt makes a surprising purchase that could improve his health. Later, Zach and Tori ask Matt to help set the scene for their dream wedding ceremony.
264	4	"It's Not Easy Letting Go"	July 28, 2015
Amy tackles a do-it-yourself project with a friend as a way to deal with her empty-nest syndrome. Meanwhile, Zach asks Jeremy to play an important role at his wedding; and Matt and Amy finally discuss the future of their marriage.
265	5	"Finding Our Way Back Home"	August 4, 2015
Tori goes dress shopping while Zach gets fitted for his suit. Elsewhere, Matt and Amy launch the family's new salsa business; and Jeremy ponders his future in Los Angeles.
266	6	"Ready, Set, Mud Run!"	August 11, 2015
Amy hosts a charity mud run on the farm as a way to give back to the community. Meanwhile, Zach and Tori feel the pressure of planning their wedding.
267	7	"Gone with the Windmill"	August 18, 2015
A windmill cocktail bar for Zach and Tori's wedding proves to be a challenging construction job for Matt and Jeremy. Meanwhile, Amy and Matt visit a local grocery store to see if it will sell their salsa.
268	8	"Zach and Tori Tie the Knot/Zach and Tori Get Married"	August 25, 2015
Zach and Tori's wedding is just days away, and Jeremy is nervous about his best man speech, while Amy and Molly concentrate on the rehearsal dinner, but everyone is worried about a dreary weather forecast that could ruin the couple's dream ceremony.
269	9	"A Bigger Conversation"	September 1, 2015
Highlights of the series are recalled when the Roloffs are interviewed by Andrea Canning of NBC News.
270	10	"The Hamills Head to the Roloff Farm/Meets The Hamills"	September 8, 2015
The Roloffs meet the Hamills ("Our Little Family") when the Maryland clan visits the farm in Oregon, where they're introduced to the animals and go on a treasure hunt.

=== Season 15 (2016) ===
No. overall	No. in season	Title	Original release date
271	101	"The Wedding Story of Zach and Tori (Special)"	April 26, 2016
The Roloffs open up and share never before heard stories of the events surrounding Zach and Tori's wedding, and the newlyweds give special insight into the love story that brought them to their big day.
272	102	"Big Fans, Big Questions (Special)"	May 3, 2016
The Roloffs give a select group of "Little People, Big World" superfans the opportunity to join them on the farm for an up-close and personal question and answer session and a day filled with spirited games to test their knowledge!
273	103	"Countdown To The Season Premiere (Special)"	May 10, 2016
2-hour countdown to the season 15 premiere.
274	1	"When Matt's Away, Amy Will Play"	May 10, 2016
Amy decides to throw an elaborate dinner party while Matt's out of town; Zach and Tori visit Jeremy and Audrey's new home for the first time.
275	2	"Seeds of Change"	May 17, 2016
Jeremy, Zach, Audrey, and Tori take on larger roles at the Pumpkin Festival, and worry that tension between their parents could escalate during this crucial farm event.
276	3	"A New Kind of Thanksgiving"	May 24, 2016
Matt and Amy learn that they won't get to have Thanksgiving with their kids for the first time in 25 years.
277	4	"A Roloff Winter Wonderland"	May 31, 2016
The Roloff kids will be doing their own thing for Christmas, so Amy brings the family together to host a Winter Wonderland charity event; Matt doesn't tell Amy about a secret project.
278	5	"Campfire Confessions and Salsa Lessons"	June 7, 2016
Matt feels alone and questions his success as a father, prompting Zach to propose a boys camping trip; Amy tests her courage on the dance floor.
279	6	"Marriage Do's and Don'ts"	June 14, 2016
As divorce looms, Matt and Amy are unsure how much longer they can work and live on the farm together; Jeremy and Audrey work on making their marriage last forever.
280	7	"Little People, Big Goals"	June 21, 2016
Matt and Amy are on shaky ground after meeting with their divorce lawyers, but Matt thinks that more space might make it easier to co-exist peacefully on the farm. Zach finds a way to use his love of soccer to bring awareness to dwarf athleletics.
281	8	"Big Island or Bust!"	June 28, 2016
Despite the looming divorce, Matt and Amy take the kids on a memorable trip to Hawaii. But tensions mount when Matt is thinking about selling the farm.
282	9	"No Pain, No Gain"	July 5, 2016
After the divorce, Amy explores her rebellious side and makes a permanent decision; Zach enlists Jeremy's help when Sully's safety is threatened.
283	10	"Getting Back on Track"	July 12, 2016
When it's time to take the new mule out for a spin, the weather creates a recipe for disaster; Amy steps out as single for the first time and gets a new look guaranteed to attract attention.
284	11	"Expect the Unexpected"	July 19, 2016
Matt must undergo high-risk surgery near his spine; Zach plans a surprise party for Tori's birthday, but Jeremy puts things at risk when he accidentally reveals the secret.
285	12	"The Next Chapter"	July 26, 2016
After 29 years together, Matt and Amy finally close the chapter on their marriage by signing their divorce papers. Later, Matt receives devastating news about his neck condition.
286	13	"10 Big Years"	August 2, 2016
The show's 10th anniversary features clips of favorite moments and recollections-some comical, others painful-by the Roloffs, who discuss what it's like being in front of a camera.

=== Season 16 (2016-17) ===
No. overall	No. in season	Title	Original release date
287	101	"Countdown to the New Season (Special)"	November 22, 2016
2-hour Countdown to season 16 premiere.
288	1	"Gonna Be a Long Road"	November 22, 2016
Matt enters the operating room for his risky spinal surgery, leaving Amy to manage Roloff Farms on her own. As the two struggle in their own worlds, the entire family faces another devastating blow they never saw coming.
289	2	"Pumpkins in Jeopardy"	November 29, 2016
Matt is home from the hospital, but his relief is short lived as he discovers a problem on the farm that could destroy pumpkin season. Zach & Tori plan a fun wedding anniversary trip and Amy takes a huge step forward when she attends a singles mixer.
290	3	"Embrace the Booty"	December 6, 2016
Amy continues to dive into the dating world & plans a pool party with single friends, both old and new! Matt wants to install dozens of surveillance cameras around the farm, and the family wonders if everyone can come together peacefully for a Game Night.
291	4	"What´s A Lamping?"	December 13, 2016
Amy pursues her longtime dream of opening a B&B on the farm. But as it becomes a reality, things quickly spiral out of control. Matt's surgery propels him to pursue a dream of his own: writing an inspirational children's book.
292	5	"Zombie Apocalypse"	December 20, 2016
Matt announces shocking plans to build a fully-equipped doomsday bunker, with space for the entire family! Crazy or not, the Roloffs band together to help him. But can they survive a overnight trial run locked together in close quarters?
293	6	"Time to Go Wild"	December 27, 2016
Amy shocks the kids when she heads out on a date with the new man in her life on a motorcycle! Meanwhile, Amy feels Matt's frivolous spending habits for farm toys are getting out of hand, and Zach takes on his biggest home improvement project yet.
294	7	"Are You Dating?"	January 3, 2017
Zach and Jeremy confront Amy about her dating life. Tired of his living situation, Matt dreams up something big for the farm while Amy plans a birthday boat ride with friends. And Jeremy surprises Audrey for their second anniversary.
295	8	"Life´s About To Change"	January 10, 2017
Matt has big plans for the future of the farm but he'll need to get everyone on board. Amy gets cozy with Chris after a romantic date, and Zach and Tori deliver unforgettable news to the family.

=== Season 17 (2017) ===
No. overall	No. in season	Title	Original release date
296	101	"Countdown to the New Season (Special)"	May 2, 2017
2-hour Countdown to season 17 premiere.
297	1	"Navigating Pregnant Life"	May 2, 2017
The family gathers to learn the gender of Zach and Tori's baby; both Matt and Amy navigate romantic relationships post-divorce; while Jeremy and Audrey ponder where to put down roots.
298	2	"Twinning Through Life/Twinning For Life"	May 9, 2017
Jeremy and Audrey surprise the family with big news; to escape home nesting renovations, Zach and Tori leave town for a weekend; Amy and Chris face a potential bump in their relationship during a getaway; Matt and Caryn balance dating and work.
299	3	"Just Take It as It Comes"	May 16, 2017
Amy struggles to define her relationship with Chris after 6 months together; Zach realizes he needs a new job to support his family, but he's skeptical when Matt offers a solution; Jeremy and Audrey are running out of time to make a big decision.
300	4	"All the Unknowns"	May 24, 2017
Zach and Tori's vision of their family is forever changed by sudden tragedy and unexpected news; Jeremy and Audrey decide where they want to raise their family; Amy is excited to take her first step toward financial independence from the farm.
301	5	"It's a Little Awkward"	May 30, 2017
Jeremy and Audrey want a low-key gender reveal party, but family tensions may interfere; Zach's serious illness emphasizes all the hardships his child may face in the future; Amy pursues a different business venture; Matt tackles a big project.
302	6	"He'll Be Whoever He's Meant to Be"	June 6, 2017
On the eve of their baby shower, Tori and Zach find out whether their son has dwarfism; Jeremy and Audrey face a new hurdle after finding their dream home; Matt helps with the nursery; Amy and Chris have a serious talk about their size difference.
303	7	"This Is Going to Be a Stressful Time"	June 13, 2017
Despite their fears, Tori and Zach face the reality that she may need a C-section; Jeremy and Audrey are nervous as they try to finalize the purchase of their dream home; Amy and Matt prepare to become grandparents in their own special ways.
304	8	"When It Rains It Pours"	June 20, 2017
With less than two weeks to go before their baby is born, Zach and Tori schedule the C-section, but the baby could come at any moment; Zach's recent health episodes place added concern on the soon-to-be parents.
305	9	"The Best Gift Ever"	June 27, 2017
The countdown begins for the birth of Zach and Tori's baby; Jeremy and Audrey stress out, but happily finish their big move; while Amy and Matt's separate romances continue to grow, they hope for a civil and fun future as co-grandparents.
306	102	"Jeremy & Audrey Baby Update (Special)"	November 8, 2017
In this update, join the birth journey of Jeremy & Audrey's baby girl, Ember. After Audrey passes her due date, the couple try home remedies to induce labor naturally. Late at night, her contractions begin & it's a rush to the hospital for delivery.

=== Season 18 (2018) ===
No. overall	No. in season	Title	Original release date
307	101	"LPBW: Countdown to the New Season (Special)"	April 3, 2018
1-hour Countdown to season 18.
308	1	"Four Generations of Roloffs"	April 3, 2018
Zach and Tori navigate life as new parents to baby Jackson; Jeremy works hard to finish home renovations before Audrey gives birth; when Tori plans a Father's Day party for all the Roloff dads, Amy celebrates Zach's first Father's Day in her own way.
309	2	"A Balancing Act"	April 10, 2018
Amy is determined to balance her family life with her personal life as she throws Audrey a baby shower and hosts a birthday party for Chris; Tori is nervous to parent alone when Zach travels; Jeremy's nearly out of time to finish his home repairs.
310	3	"The Butterflies Are Kicking In"	April 17, 2018
Jeremy and Audrey feel overwhelmed now that their due date is less than two weeks away; Zach wants to remind Tori how important she is to him; Matt and Caryn head to the beach; Amy and Chris celebrate one year together by taking a wild plunge.
311	4	"Any Day Now"	April 24, 2018
Now that Jeremy and Audrey's daughter could be born any day, Amy grapples with her decision to travel with Chris and risk missing the birth; Zach and Tori embark on their first family trip together; Matt gets serious about moving away from the farm.
312	5	"Trying Not to Freak Out"	May 1, 2018
When Audrey's due date passes, she and Jeremy play a stressful waiting game; Amy and Chris attend a launch party for Matt's children's book, which has been dedicated to Zach and Tori's son; the family gets news about Baby Roloff Two.
313	6	"It's Been Pretty Tough"	May 8, 2018
New parents Jeremy and Audrey are faced with unexpected and emotional challenges; when Zach and Tori struggle to sleep train Jackson, Matt gets to work on a fun solution; Amy's birthday is coming up, and she has no idea what's in store.
314	7	"There's No Plan B"	May 22, 2018
As Matt struggles to get everything ready for pumpkin season, Jeremy and Zach juggle their duties as fathers with their farm responsibilities; Amy must negotiate selling her baked goods at the farm; the new pirate ship may be a money pit.
315	8	"A Learning Curve"	May 29, 2018
As pumpkin season comes to a close, Matt is helped by friend and "Pirates of the Caribbean" actor Martin Klebba; Amy and Caryn work together to plan a closing party; Jeremy and Audrey face a health scare; Zach and Tori have a date night.
316	9	"A Lot to Think About"	June 5, 2018
Matt and Caryn consider buying a vacation home in Arizona; Amy ponders her own future and if she will continue to live on the farm; Zach worries Jackson's 6-month checkup could uncover LP medical concerns; Jeremy and Audrey must deal with a disaster.
317	10	"The Kid's Got More Bags Than We Do!"	June 12, 2018
The Roloffs meet to discuss the future of the farm; Matt gets serious about making investments on his own; Zach and Jeremy take their wives and new babies on an overnight getaway to the Oregon coast; featuring bonus scenes.
318	11	"Grandkids' First Christmas"	June 19, 2018
Jackson and Ember's first Christmas; as Amy and Matt plan separate holiday parties, Amy hopes her kids will enjoy celebrating with Chris; at Matt and Caryn's party, he shares big news with Zach and Jeremy.
319	12	"Zach, Tori and Jackson: The First Year"	June 26, 2018
A look back to baby Jackson's first year; Zach and Tori learn a lot about being new parents; and the future of the Roloff farm is on everyone's mind.

=== Season 19 (2019) ===
No. overall	No. in season	Title	Original release date
320	101	"Countdown to the Season Premiere"	April 2, 2019
1-hour countdown to season 19 premiere.
321	1	"Happy Birthday Jackson"	April 2, 2019
Zach and Tori juggle Jackson's first birthday party and buying a new house; Matt presses Amy to make a decision about the farm; the Roloffs come together to celebrate Jackson's first birthday; Amy realizes she needs to move forward with her decision.
322	2	"Welcome Home, Murphy!"	April 9, 2019
As Zach and Tori prepare to welcome a new member to the family, they receive some concerning news from their realtor; after another disagreement with Amy over the farm, Matt makes a proposal to separate the two properties.
323	3	"The Other Side of the Farm"	April 16, 2019
Matt and Amy spar over the future of the farm after Amy proposes a bold new path forward; as Zach and Tori struggle to sell their house, Jackson tries to take his first steps; Matt deals with a potentially life-threatening situation with Lucy.
324	4	"Two Houses, Two Mortgages"	April 23, 2019
With their home still unsold, and bills mounting, Zach struggles to come up with the perfect low-cost anniversary surprise for Tori; when the guys crash the ladies' beach trip, Amy and Chris butt heads; tempers flare between Matt and Amy.
325	5	"Home Sweet Home"	April 30, 2019
Amy is preparing for a family trip back to Michigan. Chris plans on coming and Amy is nervous to share details about her past. Zach and Tori rush to move out of their old house before the family trip. Matt is eager to get a decision out of Amy.
326	6	"God Doesn't Make Mistakes"	May 7, 2019
Amy, Chris and her kids are enjoying an old-fashioned Michigan summer on the lake to celebrate Amy's dad turning 90; Matt enjoys the peace and quiet of being alone on the farm but still anxiously awaits Amy's decision about the property.
327	7	"A New House Hang"	May 14, 2019
When Amy returns home from Michigan without a definitive farm decision, a frustrated Matt considers all options; now finally moved into their dream home, Zach and Tori celebrate this momentous occasion by throwing a huge housewarming party.
328	8	"Is This the End?"	May 21, 2019
Matt faces his most stressful pumpkin season yet as he struggles to run it without Caryn by his side; when Chris gets a tractor lesson from Matt, Amy is forced to accept their growing friendship.
329	9	"To Buy Out or Not to Buy Out"	May 28, 2019
Matt and Caryn learn the art of compromise as they start to make their new life together in Arizona; Amy feels the pressure when Chris asks her why it's taking so long to make a decision on the farm; Zach learns he may need surgery on his back.
330	10	"Whose Farm Is It Anyway?"	June 4, 2019
Zach faces his greatest fear when he gets injections for his back; big changes are on the horizon for the Roloff family as Amy finally decides what she wants to do with the farm.

=== Season 20 (2020) ===
No. overall	No. in season	Title	Original release date
331	101	"Countdown to the Season Premiere"	March 31, 2020
1-hour countdown to season 20 premiere.
332	1	"Amy's Next Chapter"	March 31, 2020
Amy prepares to move off the farm, but Matt worries it will be a slow departure; Zach and Tori are pregnant with a baby girl; Amy searches for a new house; Chris reveals he has a big surprise for her.
333	2	"If the Ring Fits"	April 7, 2020
Zach and Tori are rocked by news about their unborn daughter. Jackson tries to sleep in his own bed for the first time. Amy is frustrated by house shopping while Chris takes another step toward popping the question to Amy.
334	3	"Matt Roloff's Wall"	April 14, 2020
Amy has big news on her house search but grapples with the reality of finally moving off the farm; it's the end of an era as the treehouse has to come down; Matt and Amy disagree on whether good fences make good neighbors.
335	4	"A Proposal"	April 21, 2020
Matt holds an auction to help clean up the farm. Amy is closer to becoming a homeowner and Chris plans to surprise her at their anniversary dinner with a big question!
336	5	"Engaged and Enraged"	April 28, 2020
Amy and Chris are officially engaged; the nerves set in when it comes time for Amy to tell Matt that she's engaged; Zach is shocked about the news of his mom's engagement and can't believe that she forgot one request.
337	6	"The Last Dance"	May 5, 2020
It's another pumpkin season at Roloff Farms, but when Amy decides to take a step back, the Roloffs realize it may never be the same again. Amy and Chris host a 1980s throwback prom, but Amy struggles when sad news upends her life.
338	7	"Lilah's Big Debut"	May 12, 2020
Zach and Tori make final preparations for baby Lilah's arrival; Matt and Caryn prepare to babysit Jackson; Amy is in a cooking frenzy preparing meals for Tori's post-C-section recovery. Then, everyone scrambles when Tori goes into labor unexpectedly.
339	8	"Who's Afraid of Baby Lilah?"	May 19, 2020
Jackson meets baby Lilah, and everyone is surprised by his reaction. Tori struggles with her recovery from the C-section, while Matt and Caryn find new ways to entertain little Jackson. Then, Amy and Chris move one step closer to moving in together.
340	102 (Special)	"Inside the Episode: Lilah's Big Debut"	May 26, 2020
Zach and Tori discuss how they prepped for Lilah's birth.

=== Season 21 (2020) ===
No. overall	No. in season	Title	Original release date
341	101	"Countdown to Season Premiere"	September 29, 2020
1-hour countdown to season 21 premiere.
342	1	"To Sell or Not to Sell"	September 29, 2020
Matt surprises Amy with an offer to buy the north side of the farm, but she struggles to meet his deadline. Zach and Tori plan for a low-key Christmas as they adjust to life with baby Lilah.
343	2	"Boxing Up the Past"	October 6, 2020
Matt is eager to get the farmhouse in order, which leaves Amy stressed out and struggling to pack up 30 years of memories. Zach is up for the challenge of watching Jackson and Lilah alone for the first time, but two kids are a lot harder than one!
344	3	"Lilah's Big Scare"	October 13, 2020
Valentine's Day is coming, but problems get in the way of romance. When Lilah's cold turns into something serious, Tori's worst fears are realized. As Chris puts pressure on Amy to move out of the farmhouse, Amy and Matt battle over missed deadlines.
345	4	"The Roloff Quaranteam"	October 20, 2020
Matt's frustration grows as Amy continues to delay her move out of the farmhouse, but when COVID-19 hits, everything comes to a stop. The families come to terms with their new normal, and Zach and Jackson celebrate their birthdays in quarantine.
346	5	"Farmhouse Farewell"	October 27, 2020
Matt clears out the farmhouse in preparation for a new renter. Zach has a revelation that could change the future of the farm forever. Amy takes her farewell tour through her home of the past 30 years and finally says goodbye.

=== Season 22 (2021) ===
No. overall	No. in season	Title	Original release date
347	101	"Countdown to Season Premiere"	May 11, 2021
1-hour countdown to season 22 premiere.
348	1	"Let's Rumble"	May 11, 2021
Wedding planning gets real for Amy and Chris, but they may not be on the same page. Zach contemplates living on the farm and all that entails. Amy and Chris' housewarming party has some unexpected twists - especially when Matt and Caryn show up.
349	2	"Champagne or Tissues"	May 18, 2021
Matt offers Amy a new buyout offer for the farm, and she grapples with the emotional ties that she still has to the place. Zach and Tori take Jackson and Lilah for a swim. The Tower of Terror gets demolished as one chapter of the farm comes to an end.
350	3	"She Must Be a Gold Digger"	May 25, 2021
Zach and Tori stress over medical issues their kids are facing, Matt worries about the fate of pumpkin season, and Chris drops a bomb that he isn’t willing to move in with Amy yet.
351	4	"Hidden Secrets!"	June 1, 2021
Zach and Tori have concerns about Jackson’s bowing legs. Chris tells Amy that she must make room for him in the house if she hopes to set a wedding date. Matt finishes his “treasure capsule” sandbox.
352	5	"The Reason for the Madness"	June 8, 2021
2020 brings challenges for the Roloffs that could derail pumpkin season. Matt hopes Zach can take on more duties, but they butt heads while trying to work together. Meanwhile, Amy struggles to deal with her new role as employee rather than owner.
353	6	"Bromance"	June 15, 2021
Zach contemplates his future on the farm as pumpkin season comes to a close; Zach and Tori deal with Lilah's eye issue; Amy and Chris host soup night and share some big news; Caryn has big news to share.
354	7	"Bad Energy"	June 22, 2021
Matt has planned a major surprise for the holiday party. Amy is feeling the pressure of planning a wedding with little time and while undecided on the venue. Zach and Tori feel there will be endless drama if Amy and Chris get married at Roloff Farms.
355	8	"Can You Handle It?"	June 29, 2021
Chris makes a major move as he and Amy finally make an important decision regarding their wedding; Zach and Tori celebrate the 10-year anniversary of their first date as Matt and Caryn babysit the kids.
356	9	"A Very Chaotic Summer"	July 6, 2021
Zach and Tori take Jackson on a playdate that spins out of control. Amy and Chris have decided to get married on Roloff Farms, but Matt and Chris’ budding bromance may cause tension for Amy. Matt has big ideas for Caryn’s new house.
357	10	"What's Your Surprise"	July 13, 2021
It's Valentine's Day, and Chris and Amy reminisce about their relationship as they get closer to their wedding date; Matt makes a big mistake in readying the farm for Amy's summer wedding; Zach and Tori have a huge secret.
358	11	"Are You Ready For This?"	July 20, 2021
Tensions arise when Matt invites Amy and Chris over to Caryn’s house. Amy and Chris butt heads when Chris decides he wants to be more in charge of the wedding prep. As Zach and Tori adjust to pregnant life again, Jackson struggles when he starts school.
359	12	"Life Isn't Fair"	July 27, 2021
Chris adjusts to a more chaotic living environment than he’s used to, but pushes back on aspects of the wedding planning, leaving Amy frustrated. Zach and Tori share devastating news that rocks the whole family.
360	13	"About the Bride"	August 3, 2021
Things get real when it’s finally time for Amy to shop for a wedding dress! Matt preps for the big day while Amy’s friends still worry that getting married on the farm may come with some unwanted surprises.
361	14	"Are We Moving to the Farm?"	August 10, 2021
The boys give Amy a hard time when Matt joins in on a farm scout with Chris and friends. It’s the unveiling of the log cabin, and Matt invites the family to attend for campfire fun! Zach takes Jackson on his first farm camping trip.
362	102	"Countdown to Amy and Chris' Wedding"	November 9, 2021
Take a look back at some of Amy and Chris' most memorable moments in preparation for their big day.
363	103	"Amy and Chris' Happily Ever After"	November 9, 2021
In a special of Little People, Big World, Amy Roloff and Chris Marek celebrate their wedding. With their wedding less than four weeks away, Amy & Chris still have a substantial to-do list—Amy accepted ex-husband Matt’s offer to hold the wedding on Roloff Farms, but he’s building a new barn right next to the spot where they’ll be exchanging vows and they’re worried it won’t be finished in time. With all of the renovations, Amy is concerned that her wedding space will be a construction zone, and to alleviate her worries she takes a girls trip with her friends. As her wedding date approaches, Amy worries her father's health problems will prevent him from walking her down the aisle. Finally, the family gathers to celebrate the marriage of Chris and Amy and it’s a day full of emotion and love as Amy starts her second act with her new husband.

=== Season 23 (2022) ===
No. overall	No. in season	Title	Original release date
364	1	"Roloffs Crazy Train"	May 17, 2022
Zach and Tori dream of raising their family on the farm, but negotiations with Matt take a turn for the worse. Amy and Chris look forward to life as a married couple, but Zach reveals a shocking family decision.
365	2	"True Bromance"	May 24, 2022
Expect the unexpected when Amy and Chris invite Matt and Caryn to dinner. Caryn buys Matt a new contraption to help recharge their relationship. As Zach prepares to break a powerlifting record, injuries and weight issues threaten his goal.
366	3	"Battle Ground"	May 31, 2022
Pumpkin season is underway, but with things still tense between Matt and Zach, Zach and Tori skip it to focus on their move and on Jackson, who needs surgery for his bowed legs. Also, Chris gets off to a rocky start as a wagon tour guide.
367	4	"We're Gonna Pop Out That Baby"	June 7, 2022
It's not all rainbows when Matt visits Zach's new home for the first time. Meanwhile, Amy babysits Jackson as Chris adjusts to being a grandparent, and the entire family prepares for Lilah's second birthday. Also, Zach and Tori have a big announcement.
368	5	"Two Two Cute"	June 14, 2022
Lilah's birthday brings friends and family together, but everyone struggles with the new normal for Christmas now that Zach and Tori live in Battle Ground, WA. Nerves run high as Jackson undergoes leg surgery, and his recovery takes longer than expected.
369	6	"A Roloff Party-Off"	June 21, 2022
As Jackson recovers from leg surgery, Zach, Tori and the kids celebrate the holidays in their own way. Amy and Matt throw separate holiday parties as the family tries to adjust to this new normal. A barn fire forces Matt to rethink his future on the farm.
370	7	"My New Husband Helping My Ex..."	June 28, 2022
Amy and Chris head to Arizona to visit Matt and Caryn! The fearsome foursome explore Sedona, go off-roading and get a little too close for comfort. Zach and Tori worry about getting Lilah to sleep in her big girl bed before baby number three arrives.
371	8	"Back to The Farm: Break in the Matrix"	July 5, 2022
Matt comes to a big decision about the farmhouse that is sure to create a stir in the family, and Tori has some exciting news to share with Zach. Amy and Chris visit Zach and Tori to see Zach's new sandbox.
372	9	"Back to The Farm: Time for a New Chapter"	July 12, 2022
As Matt prepares to put the farmhouse up for sale, Amy and Chris contemplate what it could mean for the entire Roloff family. Zach and Tori take Jackson and Lilah on separate playdates to enjoy some one-on-one time before the new baby arrives.
373	10	"The Legacy of the Farm"	July 19, 2022
Matt updates the family with news about Roloff Farms. When no one responds, Matt is left hoping that his relationship with Zach is not in jeopardy yet again. Amy confronts Matt about the conflict he's caused with the family.

=== Season 24 (2022) ===
No. overall	No. in season	Title	Original release date
374	1	"Lucky Number Three!"	November 1, 2022
Matt's decision to sell the farm continues to cause a rift in the family. Zach and Tori scramble to make it to the hospital when baby number three decides to come early! Tori worries how the kids will react to the new baby.
375	2	"One Word Short of Saying the Right Thing"	November 8, 2022
Zach, Tori and the kids adjust to life with a newborn. Chris comes to a revelation about his past decisions. Matt and Caryn open up to friends about their strained relationship with Zach and Tori.
376	3	"We Feel Outnumbered!"	November 15, 2022
An unfortunate interaction with Chris forces Amy to think about her past. Then, naughty secrets are revealed when Matt hosts a barbecue for old friends, and Zach and Tori find themselves at a crossroads with Matt and Caryn.
377	4	"Left Behind"	November 22, 2022
Matt and Caryn meet Josiah for the first time. Zach worries Jackson might lose his confidence once he realizes he's a little person. Matt gets news that will affect his future with Caryn.
378	5	"Witous or Against Us"	November 29, 2022
Zach and Tori's friends, the Witouses, visit them in Battle Ground, Washington. With the farm up for sale, Amy reassesses her involvement in pumpkin season. Zach and Tori face harsh truths about Jackson's future. Matt deals with a heartbreaking tragedy.
379	6	"Surprise!"	December 6, 2022
Amy throws a surprise party for Chris, but she worries whether she'll be able to keep him in the dark until the big day. Matt makes a trip to Battle Ground, Washington, and reflects on the importance of family after the loss of his father.
380	7	"A Problem in Our Marriage"	December 13, 2022
Matt comes to a realization about his family when he spends time with his mother in Arizona. Josiah's sleep schedule puts a strain on Zach and Tori's marriage. Amy makes a decision about her involvement in pumpkin season.
381	8	"It's Time for Plan B"	December 20, 2022
Parental demands push Zach and Tori to the brink. As Zach removes himself from another pumpkin season, Matt approaches Amy and Chris for help. With the farm sale stalled, Matt considers a daring plan B.
382	9	"Roloffs Don't Discuss Feelings"	December 27, 2022
Amy and Chris have a serious discussion about growing their family while Zach and Tori hash out some relationship issues. Although he hasn't yet talked to the family about the idea, Matt dives into his alternative plan for the farmhouse.
383	10	"You Have Got To Be High"	January 3, 2023
The gates open for pumpkin season, and Matt wonders if the kids will come. Amy and Chris join Zach and family on an RV camping trip. Also, Matt shows Amy and Chris the refurbished farmhouse rental property, and he makes an announcement that stuns Amy.
384	101	"A Farm Divided"	February 13, 2024
In this Season 24 recap the legacy of Roloff Farms is at stake as Matt and Zach fail to reach an agreement on a farm deal. Zach and Tori relocate to Battle Ground, Washington, and welcome a new addition to the family. Matt makes a big decision about what's next for the farm.

=== Season 25 (2024) ===
No. overall	No. in season	Title	Original release date
385	1	"Back to the Farm: Sitting on a Knife's Edge"	February 20, 2024
Dealing with the fallout of the farm sale going south, Matt surprises everyone when he proposes to Caryn; Amy looks to bring everyone together by throwing a fundraiser on the farm; Zach and Tori's lives are turned upside-down by an emergency surgery.
386	2	"Get Your Girlfriends Straight"	February 27, 2024
Matt and Caryn realize how much their tastes clash when shopping for their new home; Matt invites Chris over to hang with his inner circle, and no topic is off limits; Zach and Tori take the kids bowling for a friendly family competition.
387	3	"We'll Do It My Way"	March 5, 2024
Zach's parenting skills are put to the test when Tori goes on a girls' trip, leaving him to watch all three kids by himself; Amy pushes forward with her plans for the charity event but struggles to get Matt, Caryn and Chris on board with her ideas.
388	4	"A Complete and Total Surprise"	March 12, 2024
Zach and Tori attempt to deal with a challenging revelation from Jackson. Chris and Amy go on a motorcycle trip. And Matt has a surprise for Caryn that will change their relationship forever.
389	5	"Let's See the Ring"	March 20, 2024
Chris and Amy think about getting a bigger house. Zach and Tori celebrate Josiah's first birthday. And Caryn shows Amy her engagement ring.
390	6	"This Will Be a Disaster"	March 26, 2024
Zach and Tori worry about Lilah's sleep study. Amy faces the challenges of being in charge for the big charity event on the farm while Matt and Caryn try to stay out of the line of fire.
391	7	"So Old Matt Roloff's Gonna Die?"	April 2, 2024
Matt's medical procedure leaves him and Caryn on edge as they think about their future together. Amy and Chris make plans for the upcoming fundraiser. To celebrate the beginning of summer, Zach and Jackson plan a family campout, but Tori is not on board.
392	8	"Ms. Deniability"	April 9, 2024
With their charity event fast approaching, tensions erupt when Matt accuses Amy of overstepping her authority. Meanwhile, Jackson faces his fears and follows through on a promise he made to his mom.
393	9	"Where's Amy?"	April 16, 2024
With the fundraiser quickly approaching, Amy, Chris, Matt and Caryn scramble to get everything ready in time. Major chaos ensues as the guests arrive and Amy and Chris are nowhere in sight. Back in Battleground, Zach races to finish his new shop.
394	10	"Time To Move On?"	April 23, 2024
Chris is still MIA with guests arriving at the charity event. Zach, Tori and the kids head to the zoo. After the fundraiser, Matt and Caryn and Amy and Chris each take trips away to decompress. Later, they return to the farm to ponder what is next.
395	101	"Big Love"	April 30, 2024
A look back at the lives of the Roloffs and to see where the road of life has led them, from their beginnings when Matt and Amy first started their family in Oregon to present day.
