= Amy Roloff =

American television personality (born 1962)

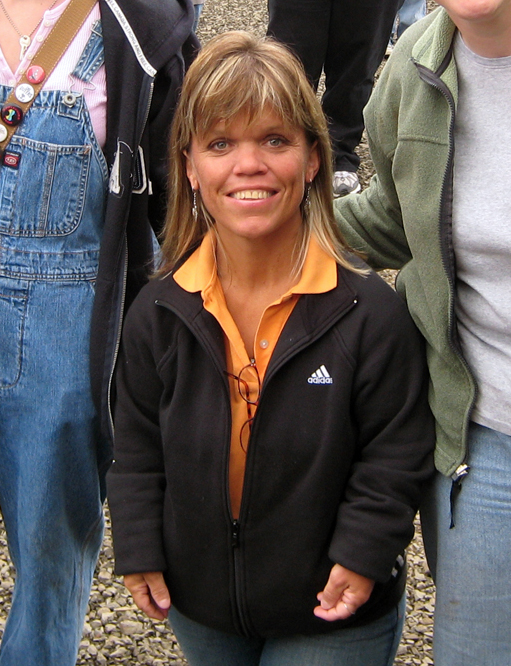
- Roloff in 2007
- Born: Amy Jo Knight; September 17, 1962 (age 64); Michigan, U.S.
- Occupations: Television personality, author, motivational speaker
- Years active: 2005–present
- Spouse(s): Matthew Roloff (m. 1987; div. 2016) Chris Marek (m. 2021)
- Children: 4

Amy Jo Knight Roloff Marek (born September 17, 1962) is an American television personality, author, baker, and motivational speaker. Roloff is best known for her reality television role on TLC's Little People, Big World. The show featured the daily life of the Roloff family, where the two parents have dwarfism.

== Early life ==
Roloff was born Amy Jo Knight on September 17, 1962 to Gordon Knight (died October 5, 2026), who worked for Ford, and Patricia Knight (died September 24, 2019). Her parents had three other children: Cyndi (died January 27, 2015), Katherine, and Roger. She was born with a genetic condition called achondroplasia that causes short stature.

Roloff attended Franklin High School in Livonia, Michigan. She earned a degree in business from Central Michigan University.

== Career ==
=== Television ===
Roloff and her family began taping Little People, Big World in 2006. She has also been featured on The View, Jay Leno, Oprah, Good Morning America, Celebrity Buzz, Celebrity Chopped, and the Rachel Ray Show.

=== Books ===
In 2012, a book by Roloff, Short and Simply Family Recipes, was published by WestWinds Press. It contains 75 original family recipes. She is also the author of an autobiography, A Little Me, and Little People Big Values.

=== Amy Roloff's Little Kitchen ===
In 2016, Roloff opened an online bakery named Amy Roloff's Little Kitchen. Some of her products include seasonal baked goods.

=== Charity ===
In 2009, Roloff founded the Amy Roloff Charity Foundation. She uses her fame to help youth at risk and people with disabilities. Roloff has also donated to the Dwarf Athletic Association of America and a foster care organization, and supported low-income senior housing and homeless shelters.

=== Motivational speaking ===
Amy Roloff also works as a motivational speaker. She was the keynote speaker at Lakes Health Conference in 2010, Empowering Women in Business Conference (EWIB) in 2015, Adrian College's Dr. James Borland Convocational Series in 2019, and Women's Power Lunch. She participates in the Get Motivated business seminar speaking series.

== Personal life ==
Roloff, then Amy Knight, met Matt Roloff at a Little People of America convention in 1987. The two married on September 12, 1987. They had four children: fraternal twins Jeremy and Zachary (born 1990), Molly (1993), and Jacob (1997). The couple publicly expressed interest in a divorce in March 2014. On June 5, 2015, the couple officially announced a divorce. The divorce was finalized in May 2016.

Amy and Matt owned a 100-acre (40 ha) farm near Helvetia, Oregon. The farm opens to the public during October, featuring attractions such as a pumpkin patch. In 2009, a woman who visited the farm sued the Roloffs, claiming to have fallen due to their negligence of safety procedures. The couple denied wrongdoing and the case was settled out of court in 2013. Due to the divorce, Matt bought the farm from Amy, and she purchased a new home in Oregon.

The couple also owned Roloff Farms Salsa, a pumpkin salsa company.

On September 19, 2019, Amy became engaged to then-boyfriend Chris Marek. They were married on August 28, 2021, at Roloff Farms.
