= Little People, Big World =

American reality television program

- Genre: Reality
- Starring: Matthew Roloff; Amy Roloff; Jeremy Roloff; Zach Roloff; Molly Roloff; Jacob Roloff
- Country of origin: United States
- Original language: English
- No. of seasons: 25
- No. of episodes: 395 (list of episodes)

Production
- Executive producers: Gay Rosenthal; Jeff Weaver; Joseph Freed; Nicholas Caprio; Paul Barrosse
- Camera setup: Multiple
- Running time: 21-23 minutes (early episodes); 42 minutes (later episodes)
- Production company: Gay Rosenthal Productions

Original release
- Network: TLC
- Release: March 4, 2006 – April 30, 2024

Related
- Little People Big World: Wedding Farm

Little People, Big World is an American reality television series that premiered on March 4, 2006, and airs on TLC. The series chronicles the lives of the six-member Roloff family farm near Portland, Oregon. Many of the episodes focus on the parents, Matt and Amy, and one of their children, Zach, all of whom have dwarfism.

On August 26, 2010, TLC announced that the sixth season would be the last for the show. However, the show was not canceled and is still on the air as of 2024.

In 2012, TLC aired several specials: "Conquering Mount St. Helens", "Breaking Down the Walls", and "Welcome to the Jungle". On October 5, 2012, TLC announced a spin-off series – Little People Big World: Wedding Farm. It chronicles Matt and Amy as they jump-start their wedding business on the farm. The series premiered on November 13, 2012, and ran for six episodes.

In October 2024, Amy Roloff announced the show had concluded after 25 seasons.

== Background ==
In 2010, Amy Roloff commented on the beginnings of the show: "TLC came to us about five or six years ago, and so we suddenly realized we were given a great opportunity to educate people about dwarfism. When it was offered that we do a show about our lives, my husband and I were like, "Wow, nothing like this has even been on the air." Nothing had depicted dwarfism in an everyday way. Lo and behold, a few episodes turned into six seasons. And here we are."

== Premise ==
The show follows the daily lives of the Roloff family — parents Matt and Amy, and their four children: Zach, Jeremy, Molly, and Jacob. Matt, Amy, and Zach have dwarfism, while Jeremy, Molly, and Jacob are of average height. Zach and Jeremy are fraternal twins; although Jeremy is of average height, his brother Zach is a little person (4'4", or 132 cm).

The family lives on the 36-acre (150,000 m^{2}) Roloff Farm, located north of Hillsboro in Helvetia, Oregon, a suburb of Portland.

Later seasons feature the children's marriages, the birth of their children, Amy and Matt's divorce and subsequent relationships with other partners, and the sale of the farm.

== Family members ==
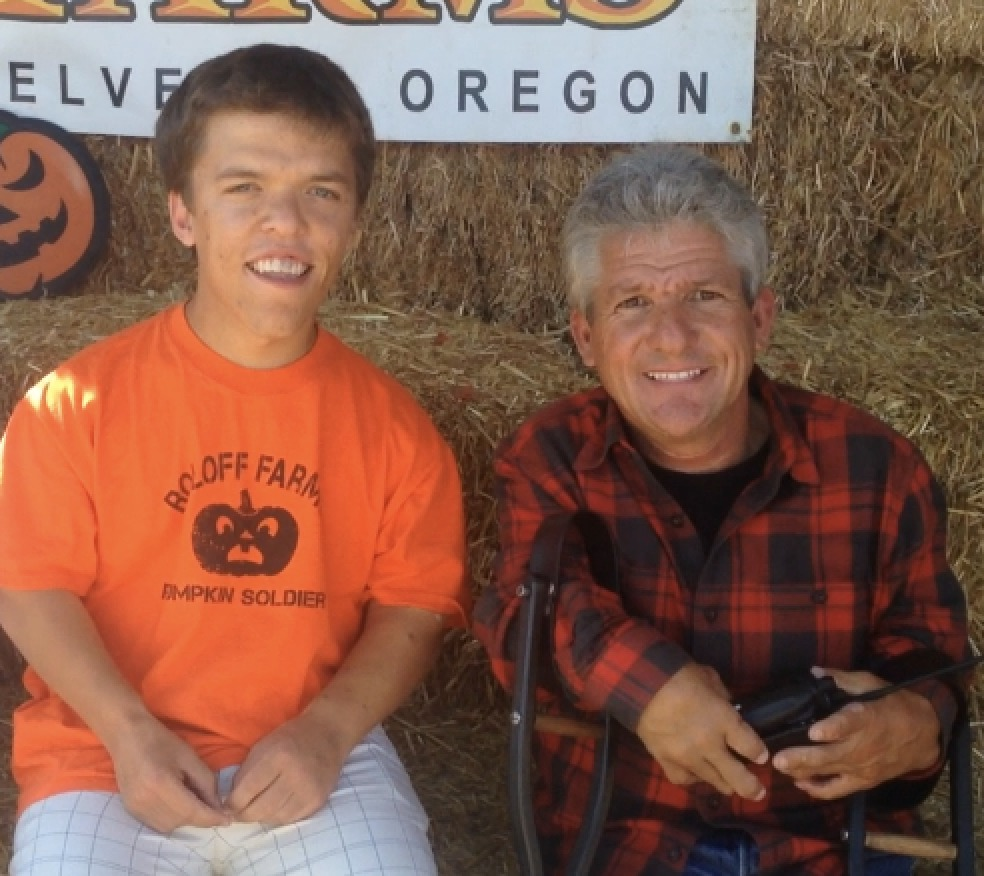
Zach (left) and Matt (right) in 2014

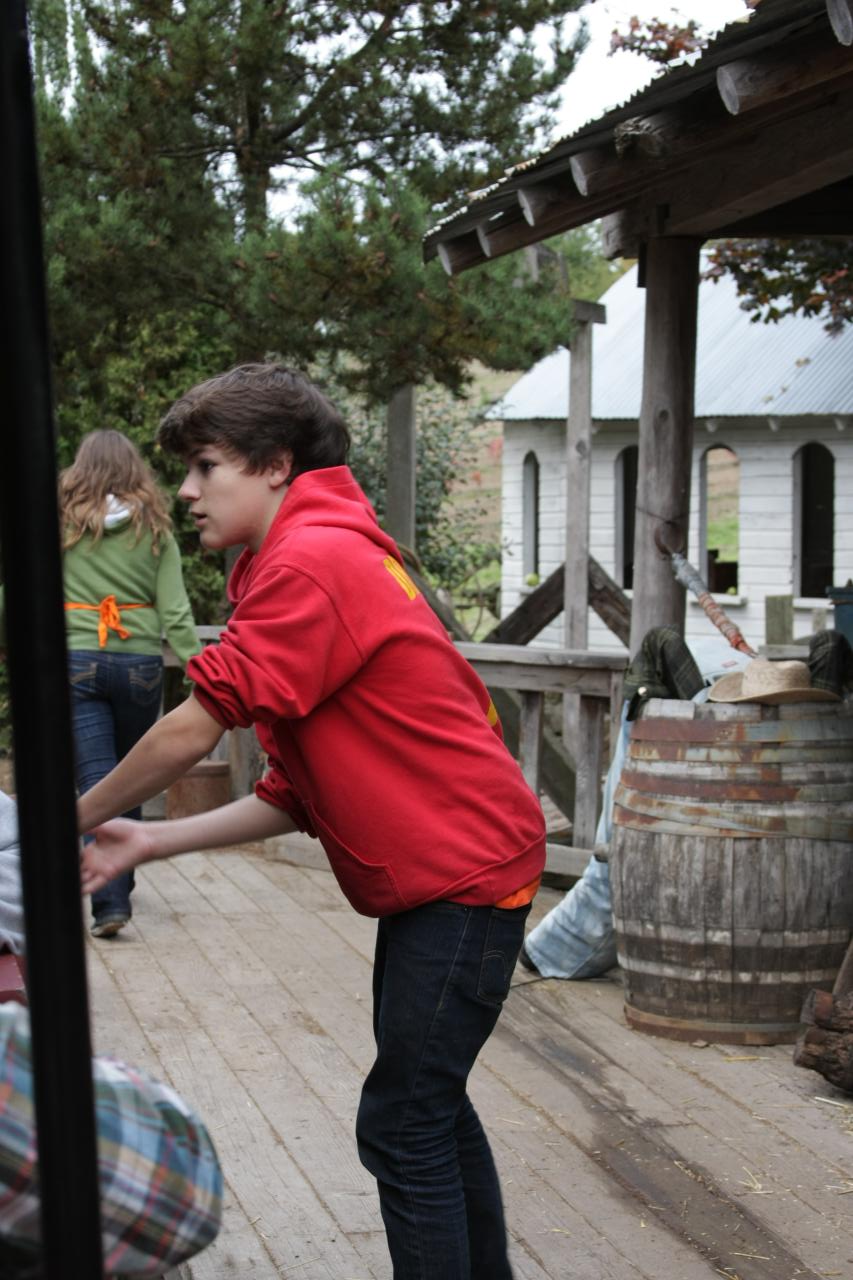
Jacob Roloff in 2011

=== Parents ===
- Matthew ("Matt") – (born October 7, 1961, in California) ex-husband and father; Matt's career was in computer software sales. As the series began, Matt was no longer employed by the company, but was engaged in establishing the business he co-founded, Direct Access Solutions. The company markets accessibility kits for little people to the hospitality industry. As the first season ended, Matt started another job as a software salesman with Amdocs to provide the family with additional income. Matt's type of dwarfism, diastrophic dysplasia, resulted in numerous childhood surgeries. He walks with the aid of crutches and uses a motorized cart when needed. After his divorce from Amy in April 2016, he began dating Caryn Chandler, the farm's manager. They announced that they will be married in 2024.
- Amy Roloff (née Knight) – (b. September 17, 1962, in Michigan) ex-wife and mother; Amy's type of dwarfism is achondroplasia, and she has experienced very few (if any) complications. Amy is a graduate of Central Michigan University. When not acting, coaching, parenting, or teaching, she is a philanthropist. Her Amy Roloff Charity Foundation makes use of her celebrity by benefiting the needs of kids, at-risk youths, and disability groups. Amy has also given back to the Dwarf Athletic Association of America, helped fund an organization for foster care parents and the kids they have adopted, and supported low-income senior housing and a homeless shelter focusing on keeping family units together. Achondroplasia is an autosomal dominant genetic disorder with 80% of cases identified as a sporadic mutation. Her memoir, A Little Me, was published in July 2019. After her divorce from Matt in April 2016, she married Chris Marek in August 2021 on Roloff Farm and the wedding became a featured episode of the show in season 22 aired later that year.

=== Children ===
- Zachary Luke (born 1990). Married Tori Patton on July 25, 2015, on Roloff Farm, where they met after working together. They have three children, Jackson Kyle (born May 12, 2017), Lilah Ray (born November 19, 2019) and Josiah Luke (born April 30, 2022). Tori is average height while all three children have dwarfism. As of 2023, they had moved to Washington and are the only children and grandchildren featured on the show. In February 2024, they announced on their podcast that the currently airing season of the show would be their last.
- Jeremy James (born 1990). Married Audrey Botti in September 2014 on Roloff Farm. They have four children, Ember Jean (born September 10, 2017), Bode James (born January 8, 2020), Radley Knight (born November 8, 2021) and Mirabelle May (born May 23, 2024)
- Molly Jo (born 1993). Married Joel Silvius on August 5, 2017, on Roloff Farm.
- Jacob George (born 1997). Married Isabel Sofia Rock on September 7, 2019, at Roloff Farm. They have a son, Mateo (born December 2021). They do not post any pictures of their child's face online. Jacob has not appeared on the show since 2016. He lives and works on the family farm.

== Episodes ==
Season	Episodes	Specials	Originally released	
Season	Episodes	Specials	First released	Last released
Pilot	1	—N/a	March 4, 2006	
1	20	—N/a	March 25, 2006	May 13, 2006
2	22	—N/a	October 7, 2006	December 23, 2006
3	30	2	April 8, 2007	July 16, 2007
4	20	—N/a	October 15, 2007	December 17, 2007
5	26	—N/a	March 3, 2008	May 26, 2008
6	22	—N/a	October 13, 2008	December 22, 2008
7	26	—N/a	February 15, 2009	May 11, 2009
8	20	—N/a	October 12, 2009	January 18, 2010
9	20	—N/a	April 5, 2010	June 7, 2010
10	20	6	September 6, 2010	September 3, 2012
11	10	6	November 13, 2012	June 30, 2013
12	8	—N/a	October 29, 2013	December 17, 2013
13	6	—N/a	March 25, 2014	September 30, 2014
14	10	1	July 7, 2015	September 8, 2015
15	13	3	May 10, 2016	August 2, 2016
16	8	1	November 22, 2016	January 10, 2017
17	8	2	May 2, 2017	November 8, 2017
18	12	1	April 3, 2018	June 26, 2018
19	10	1	April 2, 2019	June 4, 2019
20	8	2	March 31, 2020	May 19, 2020
21	5	1	September 29, 2020	October 27, 2020
22	14	3	May 11, 2021	August 10, 2021
23	10	—N/a	May 17, 2022	July 19, 2022
24	11	—N/a	November 1, 2022	February 13, 2024
25	10	1	February 20, 2024	April 30, 2024

== Ratings and reception ==
The first season of Little People, Big World generated adequate ratings for TLC (especially in the 18–49 demographic), leading to the show's renewal for a second season. Critical reviews of the series have been generally positive, citing the show's positive portrayal of little people. Conversely, other reviews have claimed that the show has a voyeuristic bend to it (albeit a nonsexual one), but allows the viewer to feel good about watching because it is not outwardly or overtly exploitive.

The September 30, 2014, finale of Little People, Big World's eighth season broke series records; 2.3 million total viewers tuned in to watch Jeremy Roloff marry his long-time girlfriend, Audrey Botti. The finale was the highest-rated episode in six years among women 25–54 and was number one on cable in the 10:00 pm timeslot among women 18–49 and women 18–34. The wedding finale capped the series' highest-rated season, in which it averaged 1.9 million viewers per episode.

Since the show began airing, Roloff Farms has become an extremely popular tourist destination. While the farm and its many attractions have long been available for public viewing during pumpkin season (October), it began receiving far more visitors than can be accommodated. During the 2006 season, more than 30,000 people arrived to buy pumpkins and tour the farm, which only had space for a few hundred vehicles. The farm was shut down temporarily by Washington County deputies on one Saturday in October 2006, due to massive traffic. Area residents have complained about the gridlock caused by the visitors, as well as about the increased media scrutiny the show has brought.

The Roloffs receive a large amount of correspondence. One report said as many as a dozen emails per minute arrive from supporters, however, the family did not confirm it. The increased exposure, however, has led to safety concerns for the family, who now deal with trespassers and fans. They have since installed a security gate on their property.

=== Controversies ===
In 2007, Matt Roloff was arrested on DUI charges. While he was found not guilty of the DUI, he was found guilty of refusing to submit to a blood alcohol test. As a result of his refusal, his driver's license was suspended for three years, because he had previously admitted guilt in a drunken-driving diversion program that he completed in 2003.

In 2020, Jacob Roloff claimed that he was groomed and molested by former producer Chris Cardamone during the production of the series between 2007 and 2010, when Roloff was between the ages of 10 and 13 years old. While Roloff did not divulge details of the abuse, he emphasized that "all fault lies with the predator" and that "no fault lies with any of my family members." TLC responded to the allegations by saying "We are saddened and troubled by this very serious allegation, and TLC will work cooperatively with the authorities. Our main focus remains on supporting the Roloff family during this very difficult time.”
