= Matt Roloff =

American television personality

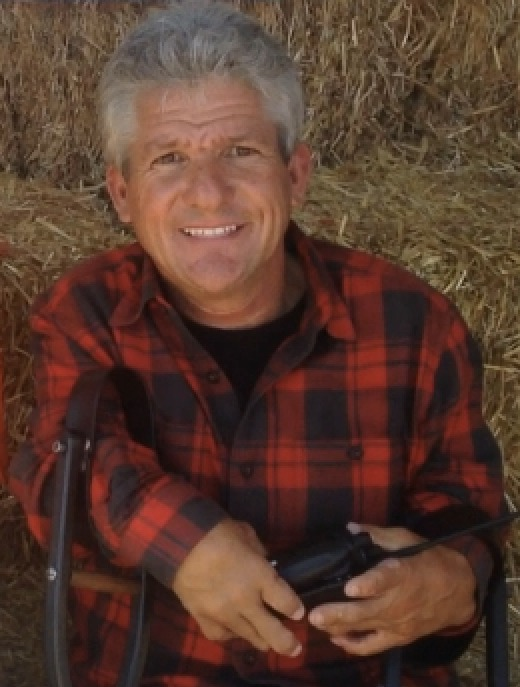
- Roloff in October 2014
- Born: October 7, 1961 (age 65); San Francisco, California, U.S.
- Occupations: Television personality, author, farmer, business entrepreneur, motivational speaker
- Years active: 2005–present
- Height: 122 cm (4 ft 0 in)
- Spouse: Amy Knight (m. 1987; div. 2016)
- Children: 4

Matthew James Roloff (born October 7, 1961) is an American television personality, author, farmer, business entrepreneur, and motivational speaker best known for participating with his family on the TLC reality television program Little People, Big World. The show featured the Roloffs' daily life. Roloff has dwarfism, as does his ex-wife Amy and one of their four children, Zachary.

== Early life ==
Roloff was born with diastrophic dysplasia, a degenerative dwarfism that caused him to have fifteen operations as a child. He was born to Ron and Peggy Roloff, who are often featured on Little People, Big World. They are of average height as is his older sister, Ruth. His younger brother Sam, an artist and founder of Back-Story Underpainting, has diastrophic dysplasia and uses crutches to walk as well. His middle brother Joshua was born with a severe heart malformation; he died in 1999 at age 34.

== Family ==
The Roloff family includes Matt, Amy, also a little person with achondroplasia, and four children: fraternal twins Jeremy and Zachary (born 1990), Molly (born 1993), and Jacob (born 1997). Zach, like his mother, has achondroplasia, while the other three children are average height. Matt and Amy met at a Little People of America convention in 1987. The couple were engaged quickly and were married on September 12, 1987. In March 2014, the couple announced that they had separated. On June 5, 2015, the couple announced they would be divorcing. Their divorce was finalized in 2016. Amy married Chris Marek in August 2021 on Roloff Farm. Matt was engaged to his long-time girlfriend, Caryn Chandler, who was formerly the farm manager, in 2024. On July 22, 2025, Roloff announced the end of his engagement to Chandler. As of February 2024, the Roloffs have seven grandchildren, with one on the way.

== Farm ==
The Roloffs bought a fixer-upper farmhouse on 34-acres in Helvetia, Oregon, in 1990. Roloff worked to create Roloff Farm, which now features pumpkins, pirate ship on a lake, three-story treehouse, full-size Medieval castle, regulation soccer field, volleyball court, mine shaft, and tunnels. There are also outbuildings and restored barns.

Roloff Farm is open to the public during certain seasons of the year, such as pumpkin season. It receives approximately 30,000 visitors annually.

The Roloffs expanded with the purchase of the 80-acre property next to the farm in 2010.

After the Roloffs divorced in 2016, Matt bought out Amy's share in June 2019 for $975,000. Both Matt's sons, Zach and Jeremy, put an offer to buy the 34 acre farm, but with negotiations not going as planned, Matt rejected them both, leading to heavy family disputes. Matt then put the property up for public sale. He originally listed it in May 2022 for $4 million but did not get a buyer. He relisted it for sale for $3.395 million in August 2023. When he did not find a buyer, he began to list the six-bedroom house for short-term rentals.

== Early career ==
Roloff appeared as an extra in the movie, Under the Rainbow. He also appeared as an Ewok in the Star Wars TV movie Ewoks: The Battle for Endor. He is good friends with fellow little person and actor Martin Klebba, who appeared in the Pirates of the Caribbean film series, and is also a member of a leading athletic club for little people, the LA Breakers.

=== Silicon Valley ===
Roloff worked as a computer programmer for Silicon Valley companies including Altos Computer Systems in the late 1980s. He sold systems software to Fortune 500 companies. A friend encouraged him to take a job with Sequent Computer Systems, which was headquartered in Beaverton, Oregon, in order to escape the long work hours and stress of Silicon Valley. Matt and his wife Amy relocated to the Portland area in 1990, while she was pregnant with twins Jeremy and Zachary.

=== Direct Access Solutions ===
Roloff also has a number of other business ventures. On Little People, Big World, he is shown running the business he co-founded, Direct Access Solutions, a company that provides accessibility products for little people to the hospitality industry.

== Little People, Big World ==
Little People, Big World premiered in August 2005. It was recorded 320 days a year for six seasons. Roloff is an executive producer of the show.

The first season took seven months to record. At the end of the first season of Little People, Big World, Roloff is shown again taking a job in computer sales for the software company Amdocs, for which he worked as a consultant.

In 2008, Roloff traveled to Iraq to assist an Iraqi family with three dwarf children who needed medical attention. His trip was the subject of the season-ending episodes of the fourth season of Little People, Big World, and it was covered by CNN and other national news outlets. The entire family appeared on The Oprah Winfrey Show in 2008.

In December 2010, Little People, Big World concluded its sixth full season. After taking a short break, TLC/Discovery once again reached out to the Roloff family to film 4 one-hour "Little People, Big World" Specials.

In the summer of 2012, the Roloffs began taping another season, a spin-off called Little People Big World: Wedding Farm. Six episodes were filmed and the show was released in November 2012.

Little People, Big World: Conquering Mt. St. Helens premiered in March 2013. In this episode, Amy and Zach train to climb Mt. St. Helens and Matt builds a one-room schoolhouse. More specials like this aired.

== Motivational speaking ==
Roloff is an avid motivational speaker and is listed with the American Program Bureau and is a member of the National Speakers Association. His speeches usually cover inclusion, overcoming odds, and sales leadership.

Roloff has spoken at corporate events for companies like Tyson Foods, Walmart, and UnitedHealth Group#UnitedHealthcare. Additionally, he has spoken for associations, such as the Association of Legal Administrators (ALA) during their annual conference, the Kansas State Council of SHRM, the Manitoba Childcare Association, and the Illinois Holocaust Museum and Education Center. Roloff was the keynote speaker at the Kids Included Together (KIT) International Conference on Inclusion 2013.

Roloff also speaks at universities, and has spoken at institutions such as New Mexico State, Adelphi University in New York, Indiana University, Minnesota St. Cloud State University, and Penn State Worthington Scranton. He gave a speech on diversity at the 8th annual diversity conference at Indian Hills Community College in 2011.

In addition, Roloff has appeared as a celebrity guest on the Oprah Winfrey Show, The View, Good Morning America, The Tonight Show with Jay Leno, Rachael Ray, The Bonnie Hunt Show, Chelsea Lately, and Extreme Makeover: Home Edition.

== Books ==
Roloff has authored three books. In 1999, with the help of a ghostwriter, Roloff authored the book Against Tall Odds: Being a David in a Goliath World.

In April 2007, a second book, Little Family, Big Values: Lessons in Love, Respect and Understanding for Families of Any Size, was released. Amazon.com credits The Roloff Family and Tracy Summer, the same ghostwriter that helped with Roloff's first book. In May 2018, Roloff's third book was released. The book is a children's book titled "Little Lucy, Big Race" and it's dedicated to his grandson, Jackson.

== Activism ==
Roloff is the former president of Little People of America. He also co-founded and serves as President of Coalition for Dwarf Advocacy, a non-profit for short-statured individuals. Roloff established Direct Access Solutions, which sells a Short Stature Accessibility Kit to hotel chains with tools for little people and people of short stature to ensure a safe hotel stay.

Roloff has traveled to Iraq three times to visit U.S. troops and help an Iraqi family get medical attention for their three children with dwarfism.

== Lawsuit ==
In early 2013, the Roloffs sued Washington County, Oregon, when a county building inspector allegedly entered their property without permission or a warrant.

== Legal issues ==
In 2003, Roloff agreed to enter an alcohol diversion program after being charged with driving under the influence. The arrest stemmed from an incident in which Roloff swerved his vehicle off the road and into a ditch. Upon his completion of the program, the charges were dropped.

On June 19, 2007, Roloff was pulled over by Washington County Sheriff's Deputy and charged with DUI. The deputy claimed that Roloff was driving outside the travel lane after leaving a bar parking lot. Roloff claimed that he had difficulty controlling the SUV because it was fitted with smaller pedal and brake extensions for his wife, and that he had dropped someone off in the bar parking lot.

Roloff pleaded not guilty to the DUI charge. A witness stated that the bar parking lot was used as a meeting spot and that he did not see Roloff drinking that night. Judge Donald LeTourneau acquitted Roloff on the DUI charge and dismissed the case due to jury misconduct and inability to prove the case beyond a reasonable doubt. Judge Le Tourneau also stated "I have found Mr. Roloff credible in this case." The trial was the subject of the season opener of Little People, Big World on March 3, 2008, and its conclusion on March 10, 2008.

One of his farmhands, Camerino Gonzalez Sanchez, was deported to Mexico on alleged drug charges in 2015. Roloff had authored a petition to try to keep his friend, who spent 17 years as his "arms and legs" on the farm, in the country.

== Bibliography ==
- Roloff, Matt & Tracy Summer (1999). Against Tall Odds: Being a David in a Goliath World. Multnomah Publishing. ISBN 1-57673-583-4.
- Roloff, Matt & Tracy Summer (2007). Little Family, Big Values: Lessons in Love, Respect, and Understanding for Families of Any Size. Fireside. ISBN 1-4165-4910-2
