= List of dwarfism organizations =

List of dwarfism organizations around the world.

== Africa ==
=== Kenya ===
- Little People of Kenya founded by Katuosis

=== Rwanda ===
- Rwanda Union of Little People

=== Uganda ===
- Little of Uganda

== Asia ==
=== Hong Kong ===
- Little People of Hong Kong 小而同罕有骨骼疾病基金會

=== Iran ===
- Iranian Short Stature Association کوتاه قامتان بلند همت :انجمن کوچولوهای ایرانی

=== Iraq ===
- Short Stature in Iraq

== Australia and Oceania ==
=== Australia ===
- Short Statured People of Australia

=== New Zealand ===
- Little People of New Zealand

== Europe ==
=== Austria ===
- Union of Short-Statured People and their Families (BKMF-Osterreich)

=== Bulgaria ===
- Little Bulgarian People

=== Czech Republic ===
- Association of Little People of Czech Republic

=== Denmark ===
- Danish Dwarf Association (DVF)

=== Finland ===
- Small Stature Finland (Finnish: Lyhytkasvuiset – Kortväxta ry)

=== France ===
- Association of Small People (APPT - L'Association des Personnes de Petite Taille)

=== Germany ===
- Federal Association For The Promotion of People of Short Stature (German: Bundesselbsthilfeverband Kleinwüchsiger Menschen) (VKM)
- German Association for People of Short Stature and Their Families (German: Bundesverband Kleinwüchsige Menschen und ihre Familien) (BKMF)

=== Ireland ===
- Little People of Ireland

=== Italy ===
- AISAC

=== Kosovo ===
- Little People of Kosovo

=== The Netherlands ===
- BVKM - Netherlands Association for Little People
  - Dutch wikipedia on the BVKM
  - BVKM Website

=== Norway ===
- Little people of Norway (NiK)

=== Poland ===
- Little People of Poland
- Fundacja Rodzic Nie Pęka

=== Slovakia ===
- občianske združenie Palčekovia
- palcekovia.sk

=== Spain ===
- The National Association for Growth Problems
- Fundación ALPE Acondroplasia
- Asociación ADEE España (Acondroplasia y otras Displasias Esqueléticas con Enanismo)

=== Sweden ===
- The Association for People of Short Stature in Sweden

=== United Kingdom ===
- Dwarf Sports Association UK
- Little People UK
- Restricted Growth Association

== North America ==
=== Canada ===
- Alberta Little People
- Little People of British Columbia
- Little People of Canada
- Little People of Manitoba
- Little People of Ontario
- Association Québécoise des Personnes de Petite Taille (AQPPT)

=== United States ===
- Dwarf Athletic Association of America
- Little People of America
- Little People Matter (Social justice movement)

== South America ==
=== Chile ===
- Little People of Chile

=== Colombia ===
- Little Giants Association of Colombia

== Worldwide ==
- Human Growth Foundation
- Skeletal Dysplasias Alliance
- International Dwarf Advocacy Association
- Little People Matter (Social justice movement)

== See also ==
- Dwarfism
- List of people with dwarfism
- List of shortest people
