= Dwarfism Awareness Month =

Annual observation in October

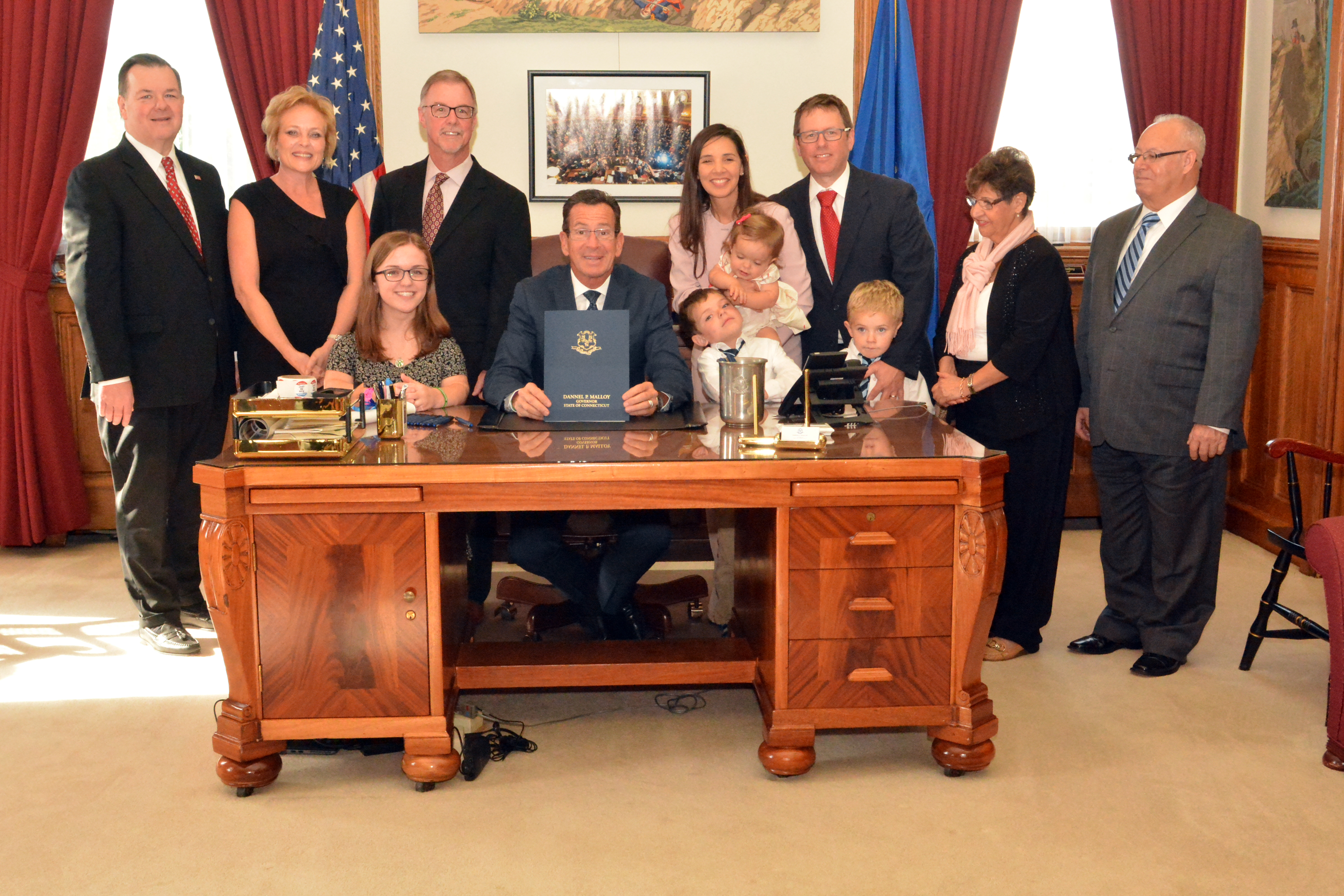
Signing ceremony with Dannel P. Malloy for a Connecticut bill designating October as Dwarfism Awareness Month in that state

Dwarfism Awareness Month is observed every October to raise public awareness about dwarfism, a medical or genetic condition that results in short stature, typically defined as an adult height of 4 feet 10 inches (147 cm) or shorter. There are over 200 different types of dwarfism, with achondroplasia being the most common. The month serves as a time to educate the public about the social, physical, and medical challenges people with dwarfism may face, while also promoting respect, societal participation, and accurate representation.

The campaign aims to challenge stereotypes, reduce stigma, and encourage understanding of the lived experiences of people with dwarfism. It draws attention to issues such as accessibility, discrimination, and the need for fair treatment in education, employment, healthcare, and public life. Awareness efforts also seek to discourage harmful language and media portrayals that contribute to misunderstanding or dehumanization.

Organisations such as Little People of America, Dwarf Sports Association UK, Restricted Growth Association, Little People UK, Child Growth Foundation, Belangenvereniging van Kleine Mensen and Bundesverband Kleinwüchsige Menschen und ihre Familien actively support awareness and advocacy efforts throughout the year, as well as corporations like Biomarin, Ascendis, Sanofi and BridgeBio.

== Dwarfism Awareness Day ==
Dwarfism Awareness Day is marked on October 25. The date honors the birthday of Billy Barty (1924–2000), actor and founder of Little People of America, who championed rights and representation for people with short stature.
