= Belangenvereniging van Kleine Mensen =

Dutch patients' organization for little people

Belangenvereniging van Kleine Mensen (BVKM)
- Founded: 1973
- Purpose: The bvkm provides information about disability rights, medical issues, and practical matters for patients with skeletal dysplasia.
- Location: Hoofddorp, Netherlands
- Region served: Netherlands
- Members: 350 (July 2023)
- Website: www.bvkm.nl

The Belangenvereniging van Kleine Mensen (BVKM) (English: Interest Association of Little People) is the Dutch Patients' Organization for little people and patients with skeletal dysplasia. The association focuses on individuals with one or more of the two hundred medical conditions falling under the category of dwarfism. Most members have a demonstrable growth disorder and are shorter than 155 cm (61 in). Volunteers are responsible for the organization.

== Establishment ==
The BVKM was founded in December 1973 by Lenie Voorn (née Matton), as a Dutch organization providing support and information to people of short stature and their families. Within a year and a half of its establishment, 500 little people had become members, and the association now had a social worker and a psychologist. It became clear that the challenges for little people were much larger than initially thought. Housing, clothing, public transportation, and job applications turned out to lead to many mental and practical problems.

== Goals ==
The main goal of the association is to provide support to little people so that they can take a full and equal place in society.

Other goals of the association include:

- Advocating the common and individual interests of individuals meeting the requirements for membership (this advocacy occurs in the broadest sense and on a general basis)
- Maintaining contacts with government agencies and all other relevant institutions, companies, and individuals
- Attracting or requesting the cooperation of knowledgeable individuals
- Maintaining contacts with similar institutions abroad

== Activities ==
Members and directly involved individuals can receive information, get to know each other, and share experiences, with the association playing a supportive role.
The association focuses on increasing general knowledge about various growth disorders, striving for equal treatment in society, and advocating for normalization that embraces diversity

The Sports Committee organizes events in collaboration with entities such as the Dirk Kuyt Foundation and De Hoogstraat Rehabilitation.

== Collaborations ==
The association, as a patient organization for skeletal dysplasia, maintains close contact with institutions such as Wilhelmina Children's Hospital, UMCU, MUMC+, and LUMC.

=== Partners ===
The BVKM collaborates with external parties, including:

- Ieder(in)
- Skeletal Dysplasias Alliance
- United Nations. N/D. Convention on the Rights of Persons with Disabilities (CRPD).
- Dirk Kuyt Foundation

=== Sister associations ===
- Bundesverband Kleinwüchsige Menschen und ihre Familien (Germany)
- Restricted Growth Association (United Kingdom)
- Little People of America (United States)
- Little People of Canada (Canada)
- Association des Personnes de Petite Taille (France)

=== Sports associations ===
- International Dwarf Sport Federation (organizer of World Dwarf Games)
- Dwarfs Sports Association UK
- Dwarf Athletic Association of America
