= World Dwarf Games =

Multi-sport event for athletes of short stature

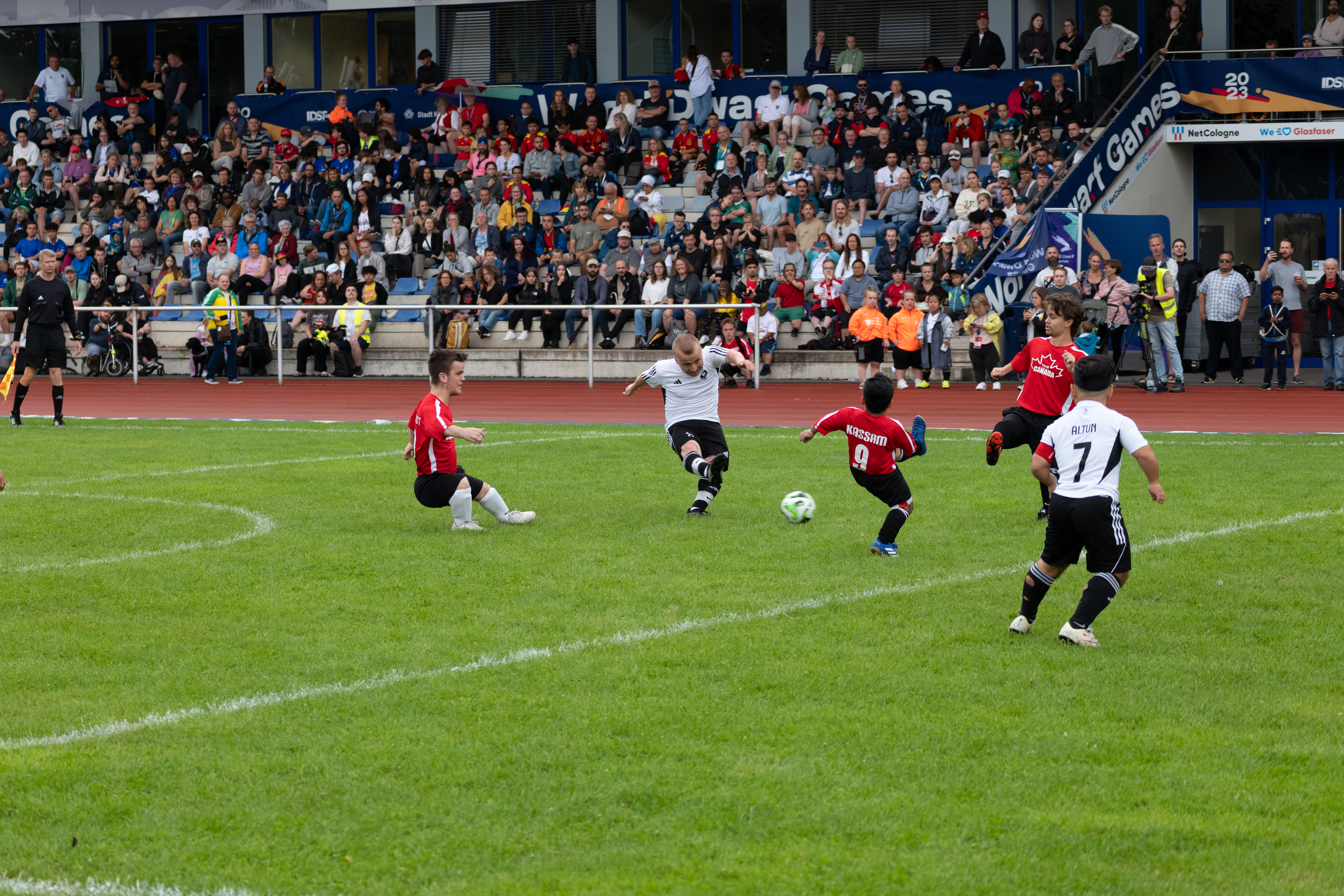
Germany – Canada, NetCologne Stadium, Cologne 2023

The World Dwarf Games (WDG) are a multi-sport event for athletes of short stature. The WDG have been held every four years since 1993 and are the world's largest sporting event exclusively for athletes with dwarfism. Many Paralympians with growth disorders start their sports careers here.

== History ==
In 1986, the first international competition for people of short stature was held. In 1993, 10 organizations united and launched the first World Dwarf Games. These were held in Chicago in the United States of America. The associations of these 10 countries then collectively founded the IDSF (International Dwarf Sport Federation), which has since supported a host association organizing the WDG every four years in its country. The WDG aims to motivate people under 1.50 meters from around the world to participate in sports. Individuals with short stature can participate in the Paralympic Games, but only in events such as athletics, swimming, and weightlifting. During the WDG, athletes have the opportunity to participate in a wider range of sports, including soccer, basketball, floor hockey, volleyball, athletics, swimming, boccia, archery, table tennis, badminton, and weightlifting.

At the most recent event in 2023 on the campus of the German Sport University and in the Müngersdorf Sportpark in Cologne, over 500 people from 25 countries participated, with over 2,000 fans attending the event. This edition was originally planned for 2021 but had to be postponed due to the COVID-19 pandemic. The next event is scheduled for 2027 in Australia.

The event's growth is attributed to the increased visibility of disability sports following the 2012 Paralympics. The event promotes inclusion, recognizing abilities over disabilities, and has inspired athletes like Ellie Simmonds, a gold medal-winning swimmer, Claire Keefer, a Paralympic weightlifter and Jahmani Swanson, a Harlem Globetrotter. The Games provide a platform for aspiring Paralympians.

== International Dwarf Sports Federation ==
The International Dwarf Sports Federation oversees the organization of the World Dwarf Games. Its objective traces the historical development of dwarf participation in sports, spotlighting initial challenges such as exclusion and low self-esteem. Affiliated with the IDSF, Dwarf Sport organizations, including DAAA, DAAUK, IDSF, and their global counterparts, aim to provide Little People with equal opportunities in sports, yielding positive impacts on inclusion, self-esteem, and a sense of achievement.

== Editions ==
Year	City	Host	Number of Countries	Number of Athletes
1993	Chicago, United States	Dwarf Athletic Association of America (DAAA)	10	165
1997	Peterborough, United Kingdom	Dwarf Sports Association United Kingdom (DSAUK)	6	83
2001	Toronto, Canada	Little People of Canada (LPC)	8	250
2005	Rambouillet, France	France Nano Sports/L' Association des Personnes de Petite Taille	14	136
2009	Belfast, United Kingdom	Dwarf Athletic Association Northern Ireland (DAANI)	12	250
2013	East Lansing, United States	Dwarf Athletic Association of America (DAAA)	17	395
2017	Guelph, Canada	Canadian WDG Committee	17	450
2023	Cologne, Germany	Bundesverband Kleinwüchsige Menschen und ihre Familien (BKMF)	25	530
2027	To be determined, Australia	Short Statured People of Australia (SSPA)	To be determined	To be determined

== 2013 World Dwarf Games ==
=== Participating nations ===
16 Countries:

- Australia (33)
- Brazil (5)
- Bulgaria (1)
- Canada (25)
- Finland (1)
- France (2)
- Germany (4)
- Great Britain (81)
- Hungary (1)
- India (16)
- Ireland (14)
- Netherlands (3)
- Serbia (1)
- Spain (1)
- Sri Lanka (1)
- United States (204)

=== Sports ===
16 sports:

- Athletics
- Swimming
- Shooting
- Powerlifting
- Badminton
- Table tennis
- Tennis (Recreation)
- Boccia
- Archery
- Curling (Kurling) *
- Floor hockey
- Soccer
- Basketball
- Volleyball
- Flag football (Recreation)
- Bass fishing (Recreation)
- Kurling is a modified form of the original curling game, adapted so that it can be played indoors on any smooth, flat surface, like a sports hall, instead of on ice.

=== Medal table ===
Rank	Nation	Gold	Silver	Bronze	Total
1	United States (USA)	158	110	112	380
2	Great Britain (GBR)	72	69	51	192
3	Australia (AUS)	44	19	14	77
4	Canada (CAN)	35	19	11	65
5	Brazil (BRA)	20	0	0	20
6	Ireland (IRL)	17	11	9	37
7	India (IND)	10	8	5	23
8	International Olympic Committee (IOC)	6	6	4	16
9	Germany (GER)	6	3	1	10
10	Spain (ESP)	4	1	1	6
11	Netherlands (NED)	3	1	1	5
12	Finland (FIN)	2	2	0	4
13	Sri Lanka (SRI)	2	0	0	2
14	France (FRA)	1	1	5	7
15	Serbia (SRB)	0	2	0	2
16	Hungary (HUN)	0	0	2	2
17	Bulgaria (BUL)	0	0	0	0
Totals (17 entries)		380	252	216	848

- MIX – Mixed Country Teams

== 2017 World Dwarf Games ==
=== Medal table ===
Rank	Nation	Gold	Silver	Bronze	Total
1	United States (USA)	116	92	85	293
2	Great Britain (GBR)	80	56	65	201
3	Canada (CAN)	41	39	25	105
4	Australia (AUS)	34	15	8	57
5	France (FRA)	16	15	10	41
6	India (IND)	15	10	12	37
7	Spain (ESP)	14	17	0	31
8	Netherlands (NED)	14	2	6	22
9	Germany (GER)	8	7	11	26
10	Ireland (IRL)	4	8	1	13
11	New Zealand (NZL)	3	0	0	3
12	Finland (FIN)	2	2	2	6
13	Russia (RUS)	2	1	1	4
14	Kazakhstan (KAZ)	1	2	1	4
15	Peru (PER)	1	1	0	2
16	Switzerland (SUI)	0	1	0	1
17	Austria (AUT)	0	0	1	1
17	Hungary (HUN)	0	0	1	1
19	Chile (CHI)	0	0	0	0
Totals (19 entries)		351	268	229	848

== Affiliations ==
The International Dwarf Sports Federation – IDSF, the organisation responsible for the organisation of the World Dwarf Games maintains affiliations and relationships with the following organizations:

- Dwarf Sports Association UK
- Dwarf Athletic Association of America
- United States Olympic Committee
- Little People of America
- Little People of Canada
- Bundesverband Kleinwüchsige Menschen und ihre Familien
- Belangenvereniging van Kleine Mensen
- Association des Personnes de Petite Taille
- Billy Barty Foundation

== Media ==
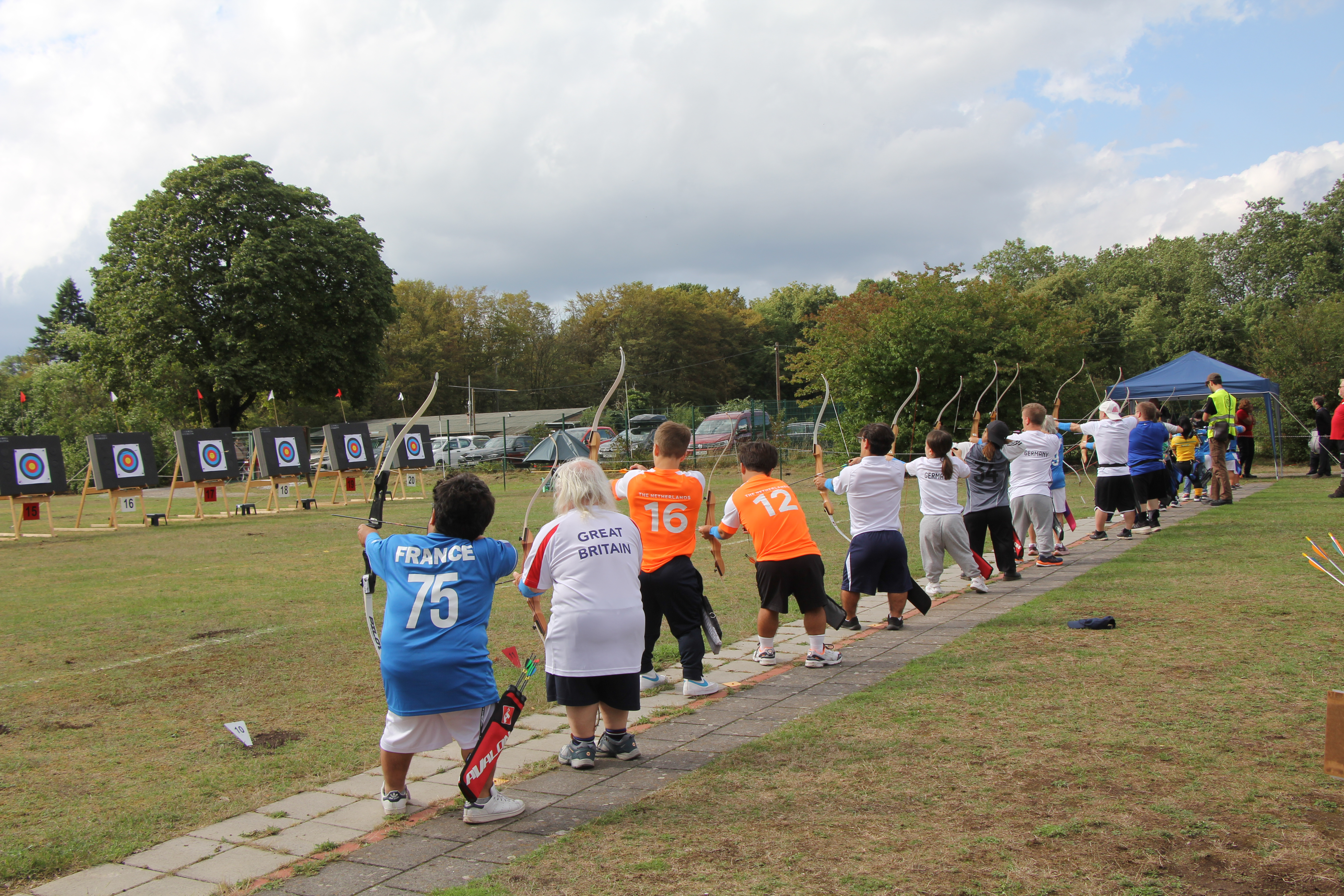
Archery in Cologne (2023)

The event has attracted international media attention, with various international TV teams reporting and several documentaries produced to raise awareness. This broad media coverage has contributed to increasing awareness and recognition of the World Dwarf Games in the Netherlands and beyond, including:

- National Geographic – Incredible Small World (2014)
- La Lupa Produccions (SPA) – Glance up (2014)

In the UK, the BBC has widely covered several editions. In Australia, the Australian Broadcasting Company has often widely covered the WDG. In Canada, news outlets like the CDC have covered local athletes. In 2023 Prime Minister, Justin Trudeau sent a message of support to Canada's participating athletes. In the Netherlands, there has traditionally been significant media attention devoted to the World Dwarf Games (WDG). Various media channels, including NOS, extensively covered the event in 2013, 2017 as well as 2023. In Belgium, the WDG was covered in Gazet van Antwerpen and Het Nieuwsblad.

The WDG have been featured in a number of episodes on the American television series Little People, Big World on TLC. The show, centered around the dwarf members of the Roloff family, has included a number of episodes where members of the family have participated in WDG events.

== Gallery ==
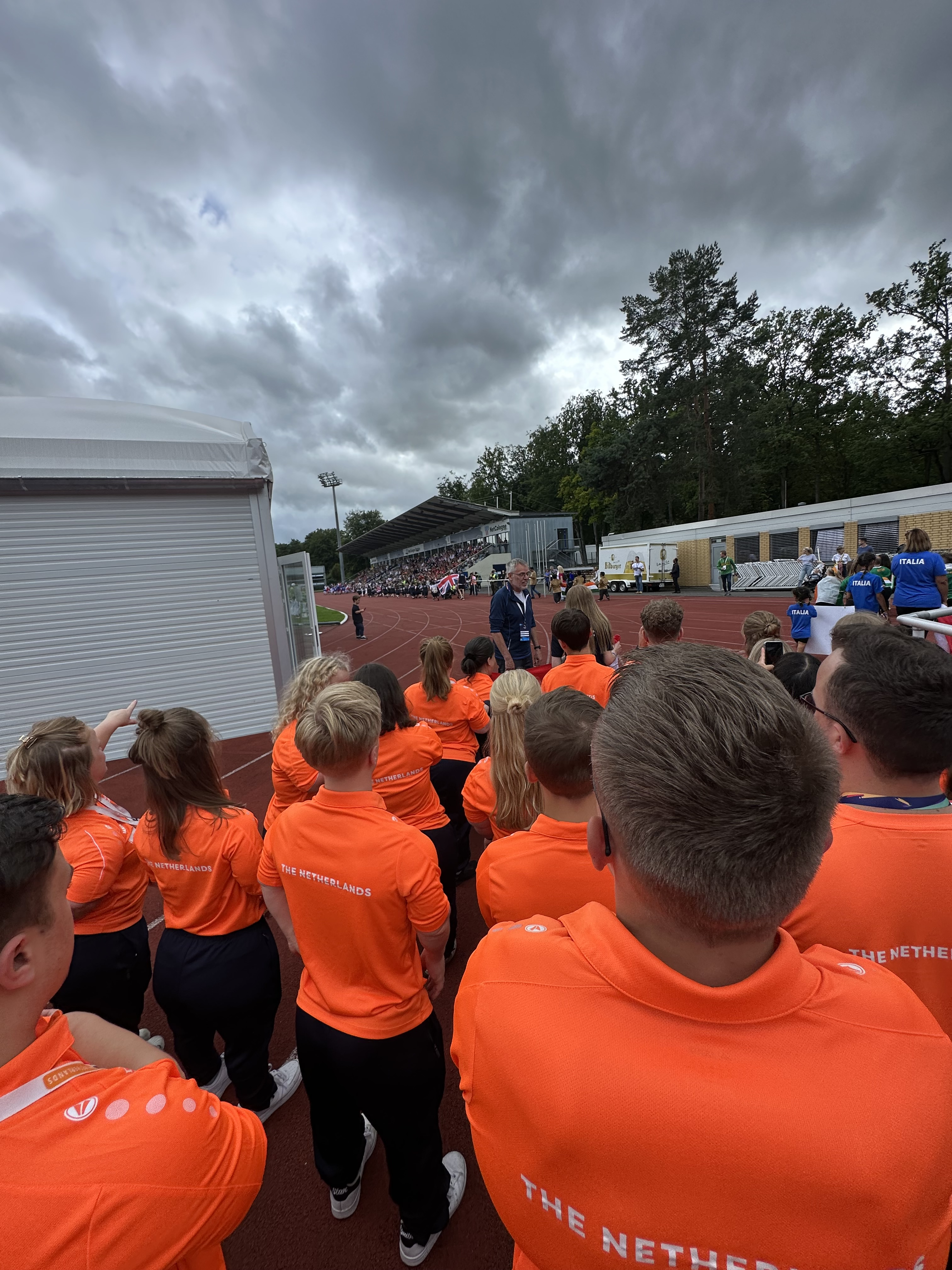
Team NL during the opening ceremony of the WDG in Cologne (2023)

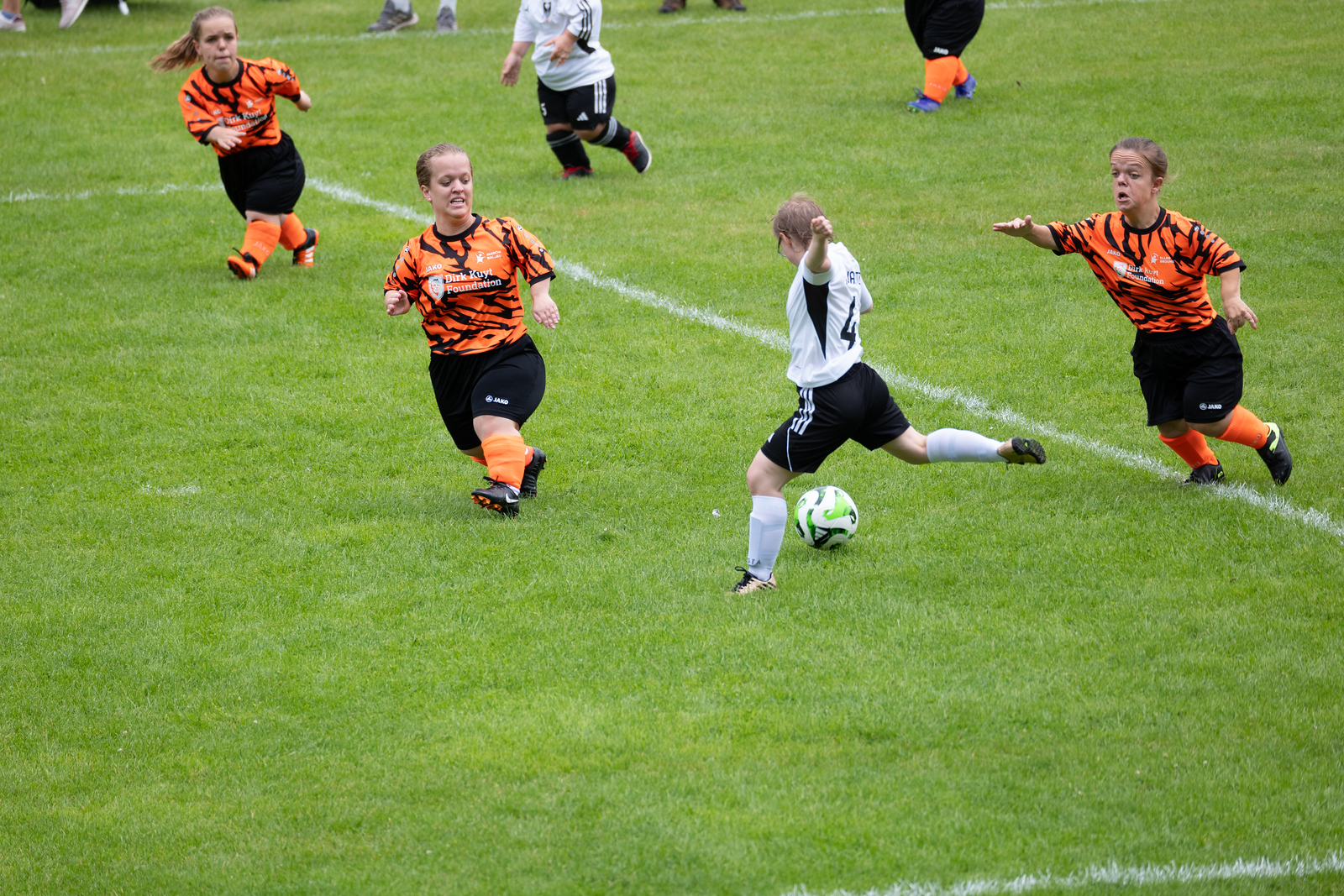
Women's soccer in Cologne. Final Germany - Netherlands (2023)

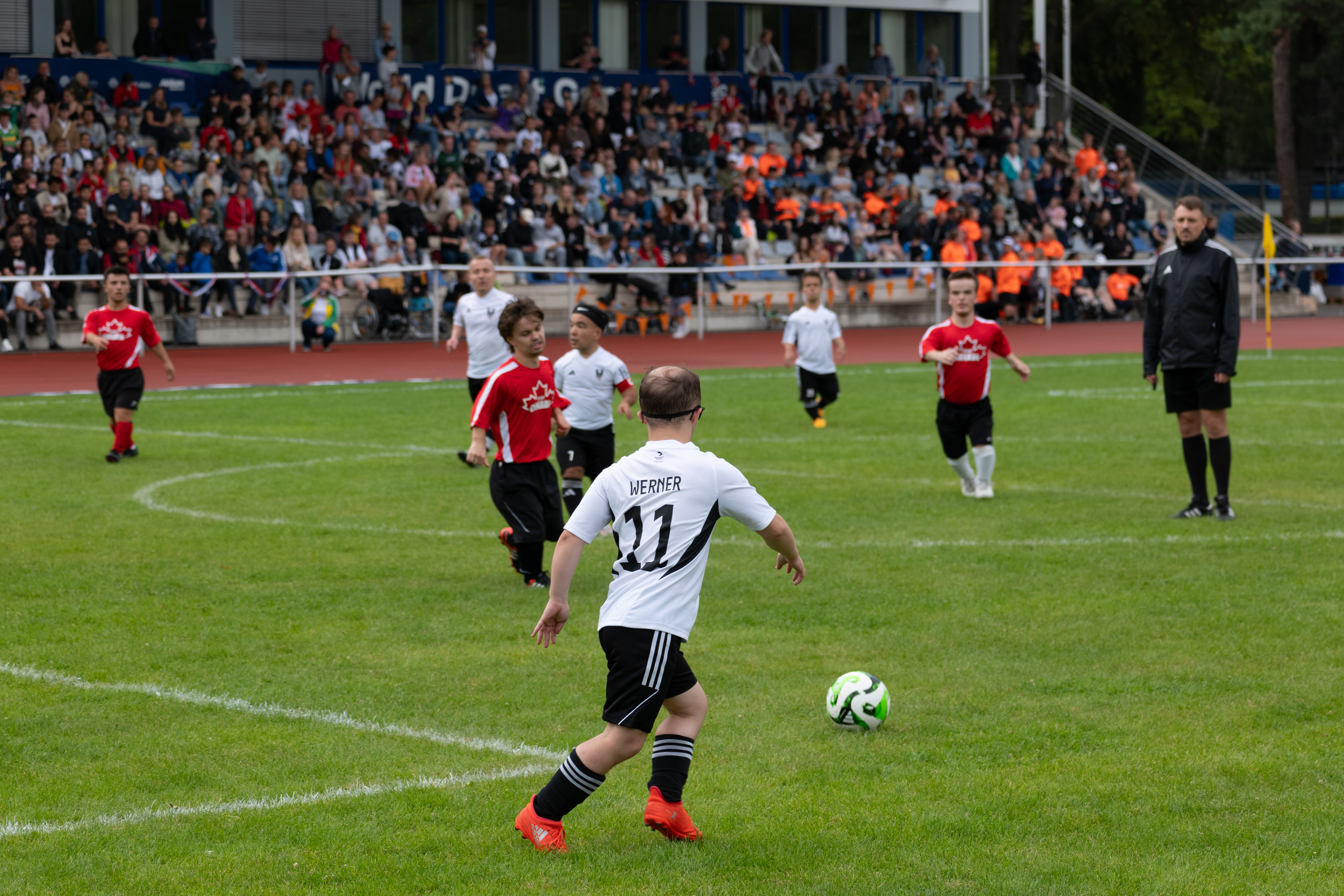
Men's soccer in Cologne. Final Germany - Canada (2023)

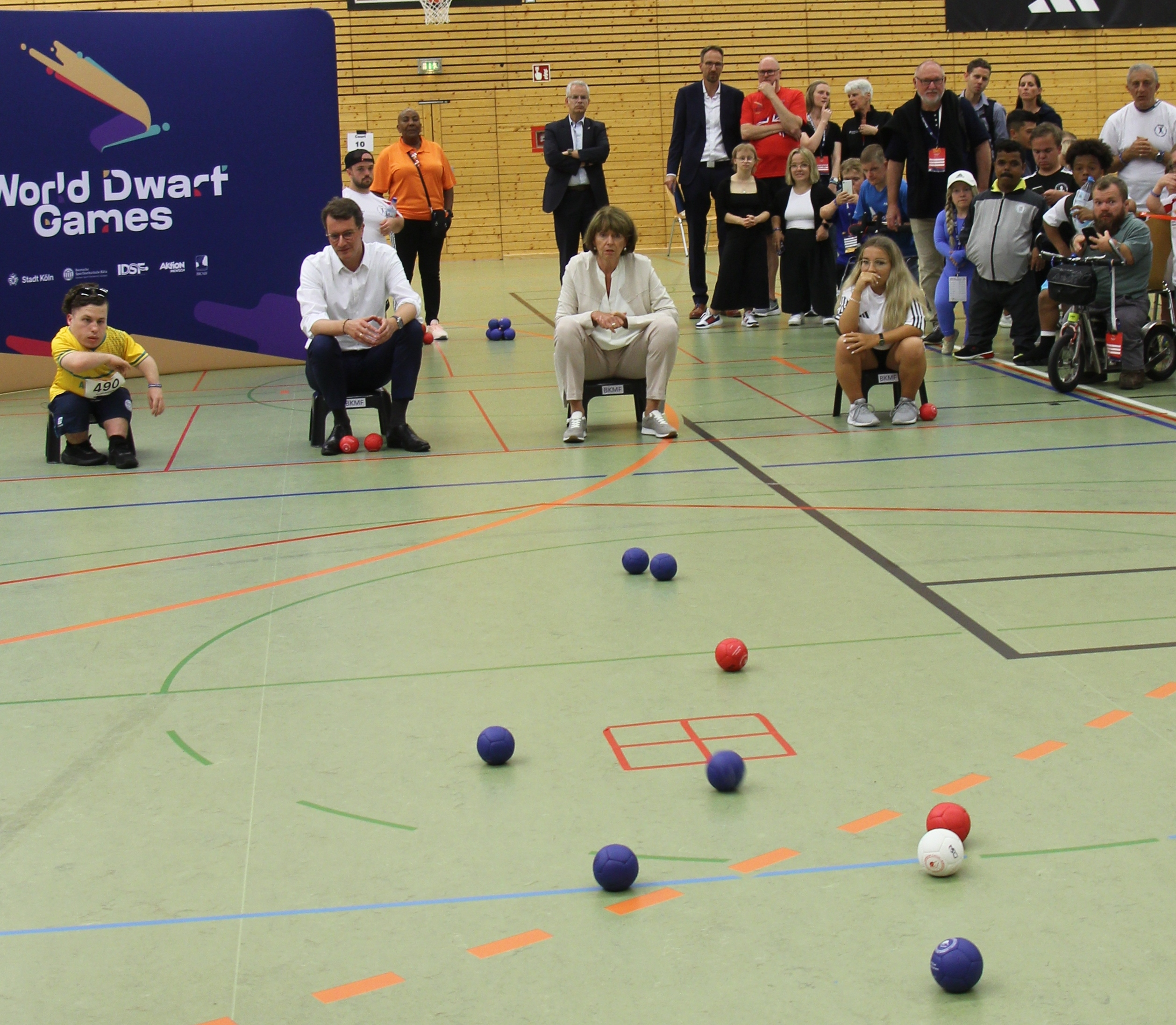
Boccia with participation of Henriette Reker and Hendrik Wüst (2023)

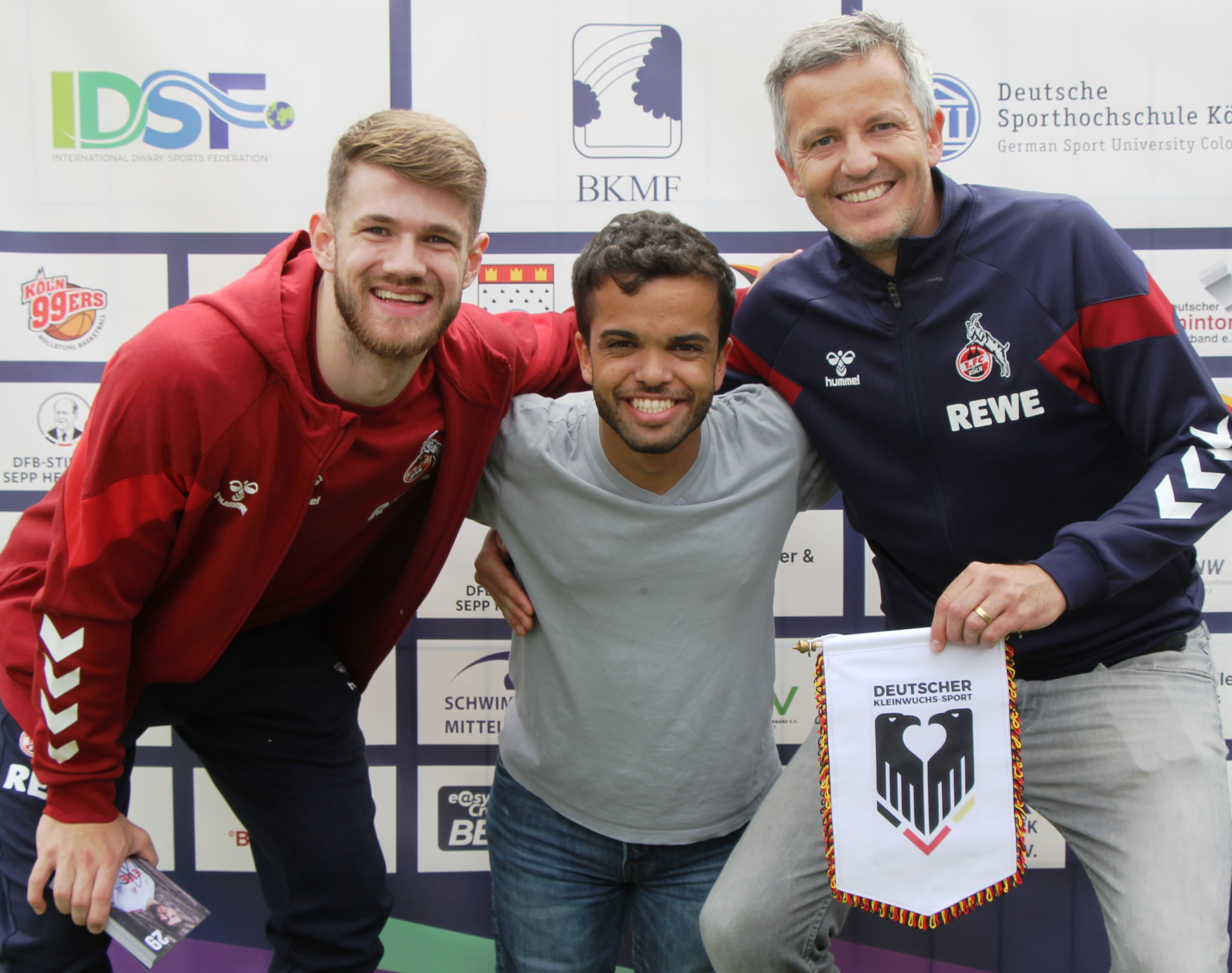
Involvement of 1. FC Köln (from left to right: Jan Thielmann, Marib Aldoais, Philipp Türoff) (2023)

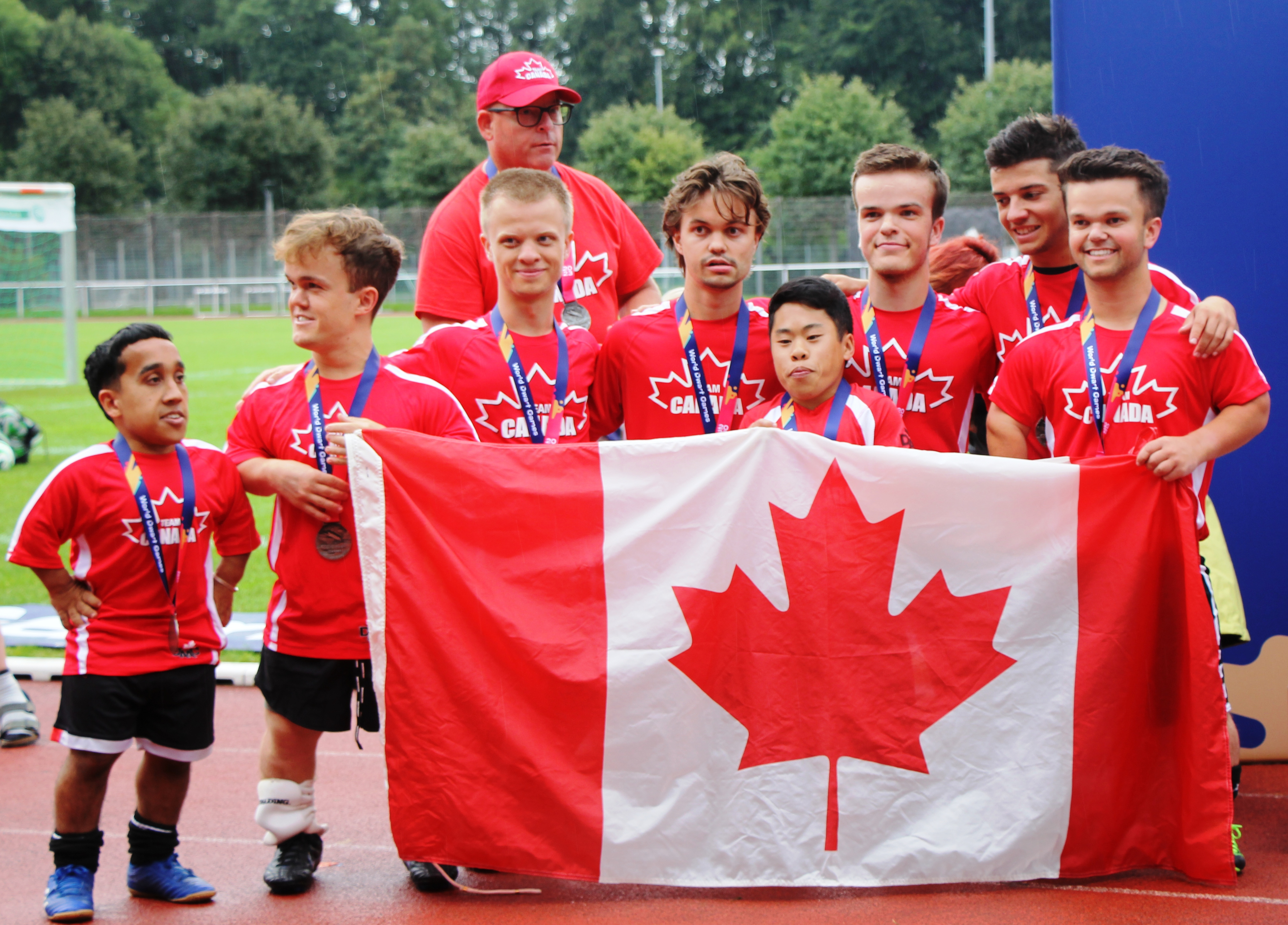
Team Canada in Cologne (2023)

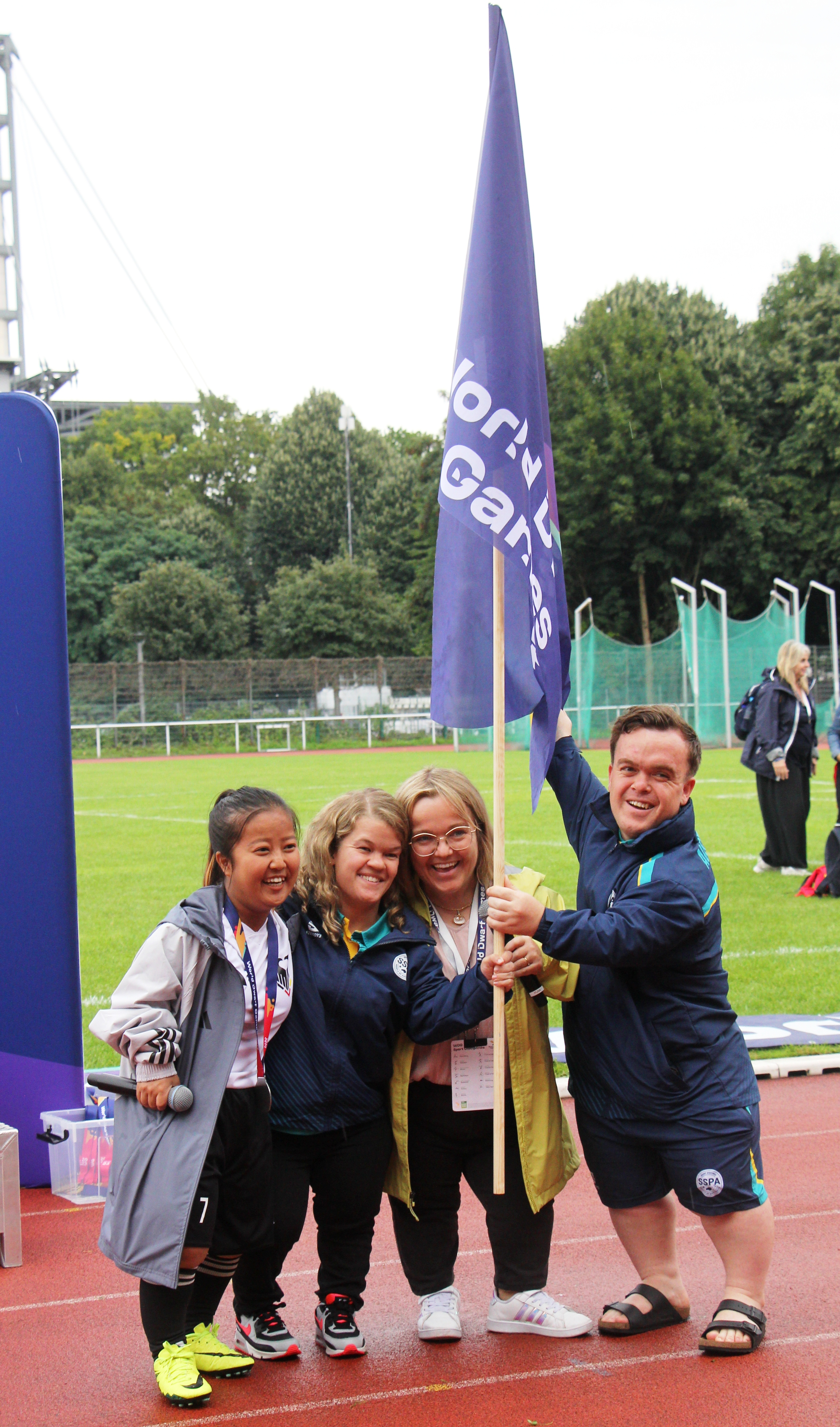
Handing over the flag of the Games from the German organizing committee to the Australian one (from left to right): Beck Kimwill, Samantha Lilly, Patricia Carl-Innig, Michael Spain. (2023)

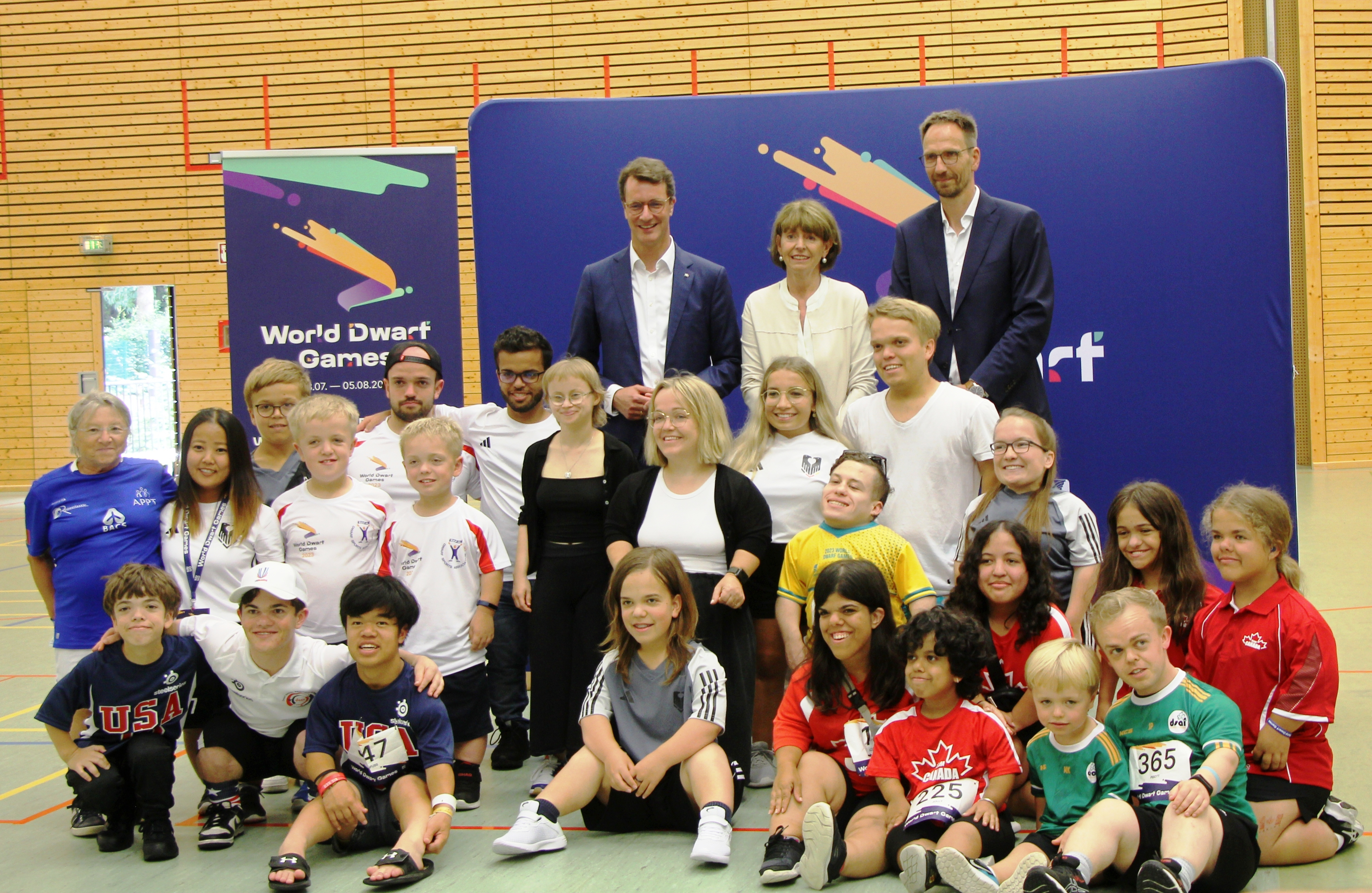
Selection of participants, with Hendrik Wüst, Henriette Reker, and Professor Thomas Abel. (2023)

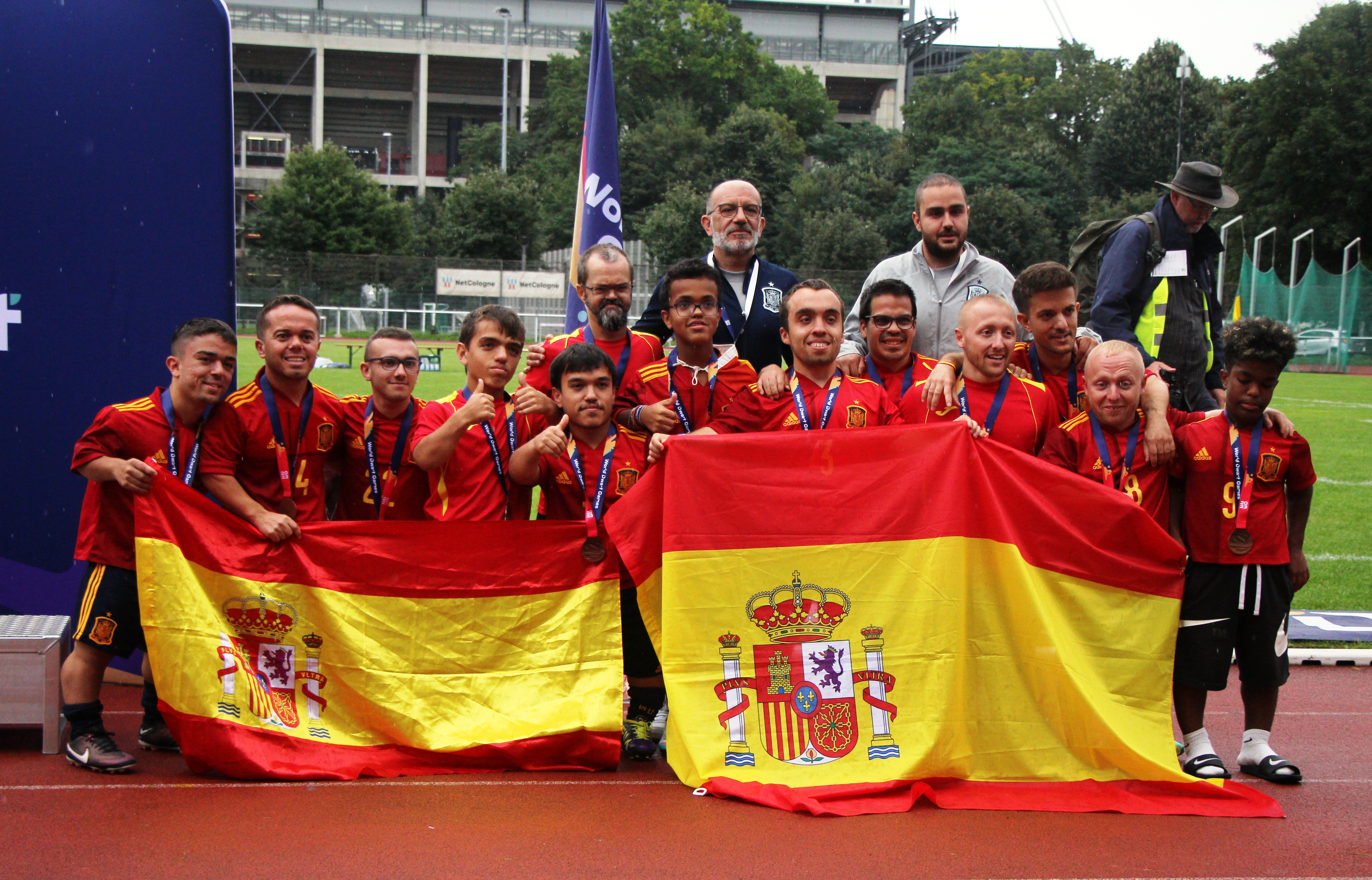
Team Spain in Cologne (2023)

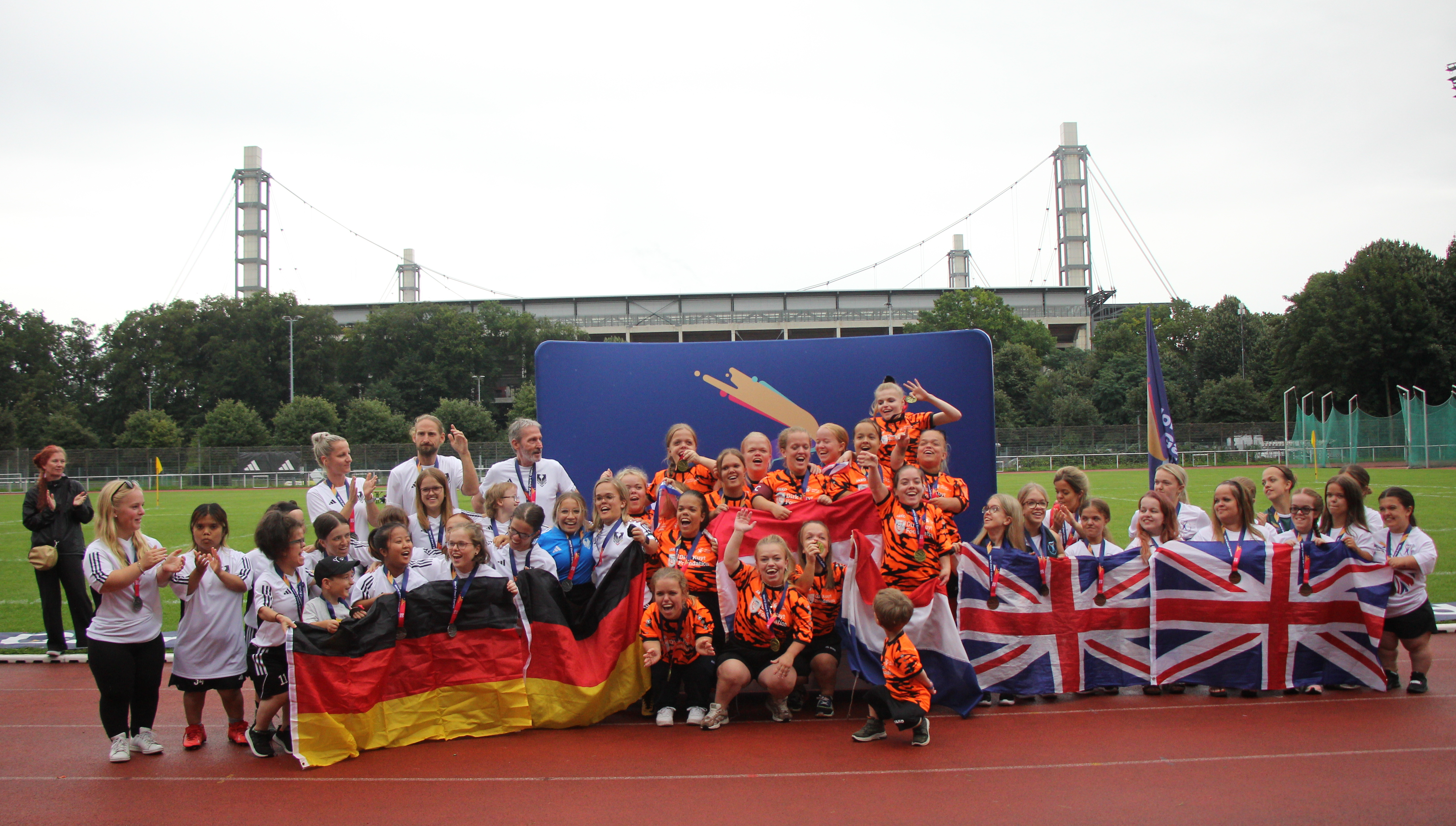
Women's football, the top three: Germany, Netherlands, United Kingdom. (2023)
