= Jahmani Swanson =

American basketball player

Jahmani Swanson is an American basketball entertainer and player for the Harlem Globetrotters.

Born with dwarfism, Swanson is 4 feet 5 inches (135 cm) tall. He was on the game show The Floor that aired February 12, 2025. He lost with his first duel of "Breakfast items".

== Basketball ==
Nicknamed "Mini Michael Jordan" for his ball handling skills, he is well known for his online basketball videos involving him playing streetball against far taller players. Some photos from these videos have made several online news stories. He played for Monroe College, a junior college in the Bronx, and played professionally with other touring exhibition teams.

Born in the Bronx and raised in Harlem, he was a star player in the New York Towers basketball team, which is one of the most successful teams in the Dwarf Athletic Association of America. He has also competed in the World Dwarf Games.

== Harlem Globetrotters ==
In 2017, Swanson signed with the Harlem Globetrotters for their 2018 Amazing Feats of Basketball World Tour. Nicknamed "Hot Shot," he has been touring the world with the team ever since.

== Tours ==
Jahmani has travelled all around the world playing basketball, but is known to go to schools in his spare time to promote people with dwarfism to do sports and other activities despite their height.
