= RGA =

RGA may refer to:

== Companies and organizations ==
- R/GA, an international advertising agency
- Reinsurance Group of America, a reinsurance company
- Restricted Growth Association, a UK charity that supports people with dwarfism
- Rezerva generală a aviației (General Aviation Reserve), a Romanian aircraft factory (1916–1919)
- Roller Girls of the Apocalypse, a roller derby league in Kaiserslautern, Germany
- Royal Garrison Artillery, a pre-1930 corps of the British Army

=== Politics ===
- Red-Green Alliance (Denmark), a far left-wing political party
- Republican Governors Association, a US political support organization

== Science and technology ==
- Regenerative amplification, a process of amplifying laser pulses with a resonator
- Relative gain array, a tool to determine optimal input-output pairings for MIMO systems
- Residual gas analyzer, a small mass spectrometer

== Other uses ==
- IATA code for Hermes Quijada International Airport in Argentina
- Reallexikon der Germanischen Altertumskunde, a German-language encyclopedia of the history of the Germanic peoples
- Renzo Gracie Academy, a martial arts school
- Return goods authorization, part of the process of returning a product to its supplier for repair or replacement
