= Kae =

Kae or KAE may refer to:

== People ==
=== Given name ===
- Kae Alexander (born 1985), Japanese actress
- Kae Araki (born 1963), Japanese voice actress
- Kae Sumner Einfeldt (1916–1996), American founder
- Kae Kurahashi (born 1990), Japanese wheelchair rugby player
- Kae Miller (1910–1994), New Zealand conservationist
- Kae Nemoto, Japanese theoretical physicist
- Kae Nishina (born 1972), Japanese footballer
- Kae Tempest (born 1985), English poet
- Yi Kae (1417–1456), Korean scholar-official

=== Middle name ===
- Susan kae Grant (born 1954), American artist and educator
- Karl Kae Knecht (1883–1972), American artist
- Ulysses Kae Williams (1921–1987), American DJ, record label owner, and producer

=== Surname ===
- April Kae, American musician
- Yonatan Kae (born 1998), Indonesian basketball player

== Other uses ==
- Kae (Maori mythology)
- Kae (Tongan mythology)
- Kae, Zanzibar, Tanzania, a beach area
- Kake Seaplane Base, in Kake, Alaska, U.S.
- "KAE", a song by Chris Brown from his 2015 album Royalty
- Kartika Airlines, Indonesian airline
- Western jackdaw, a kind of bird
