= Skeletal Dysplasias Alliance =

The Skeletal Dysplasia Alliance is an organization dedicated to advocating for individuals with conditions such as achondroplasia and other skeletal dysplasias with dwarfism (ASDD) across Europe. In the context of global advancements in recognizing the rights of people with disabilities, the alliance emphasizes that the unique needs of the ASDD community that have historically been overlooked.

The alliance collaborates with various organizations to address the common challenges faced by individuals with ASDD in Europe. Despite progress in EU disability policies, there is still an observed gap in acknowledging and addressing the specific needs of this stigmatized community. The consensus declaration presented by the alliance serves as a call to action, urging the European Union to listen to the voices of people with ASDD and implement real, lasting solutions. The alliance envisions a 'social Europe' that establishes common standards, fosters increased cooperation, and brings about tangible change for individuals with ASDD.

== History ==
In 2020, seven organizations representing individuals with achondroplasia and other skeletal dysplasias from various European countries decided to collaborate on an advocacy project. Their objective is to promote the often overlooked discussion surrounding the needs and challenges of individuals with short stature, both in EU policies and at the national level. They developed a Consensus Paper addressing the situation of ASDD in Europe and proposing political actions for improvement.

The consensus paper served as a cornerstone for advocacy on skeletal dysplasias, analyzing the comprehensive needs of these conditions, including issues related to stigma, health, social protection, and barriers in education and employment. In November 2021, the SD group presented the statement at an institutional event with the support of five representatives from the EU Parliament and the European Commission. The presentation underscored the necessity of political and social dialogue to reduce and overcome the challenges faced by affected individuals. To this end, the alliance believes that coordinated, active efforts of ASDD organizations are essential.

== Skeletal Dysplasia ==
Skeletal dysplasias (SD), or osteochondrodysplasias, encompass over 450 rare conditions linked to cartilage and bone disorders, resulting in varying degrees of short stature. While each specific skeletal dysplasia is individually uncommon, collectively, their incidence is nearly 1 in 5000.

Among these conditions, achondroplasia is the most prevalent, occurring at an approximate rate of 1 in 20,000-30,000 live births. Currently, around 250,000 individuals worldwide are affected by this variant.

While most cases are evident at birth, some receive a diagnosis during early infancy. Newborns with achondroplasia often exhibit distinct limb proportions, including variations in head, thorax, and hand sizes. In adulthood, the average height for males with achondroplasia is 131 cm, while females typically measure 124 cm.

=== Sister associations ===
- Bundesverband Kleinwüchsige Menschen und ihre Familien (Germany)
- Belangenvereniging van Kleine Mensen (The Netherlands)
- Foundation Exploring Skeletal Dysplasia Together (FEST) (United Kingdom)
- Fundación Alpe Acondroplasia (Spain)
- Association des Personnes de Petite Taille (France)
- Little People of Bulgaria (Bulgaria)
- Palcekovia (Slovakia)
