= Tall Clubs International =

- Founded: First Convention: 1947; First affiliation: 1948; First Incorporation: 1967
- Founder: Kae Sumner Einfeldt
- Type: Social Organization
- Purpose: Awareness of height issues
- Region served: North America
- Website: tall.org

Tall Clubs International (TCI) is a social organization in the United States and Canada, comprising over fifty independent Tall Clubs.

The group says its mission is "to promote tall awareness among tall men and women, and in the community; to provide social activities of mutual interest, travel to cities around the U.S. and Canada for gatherings including members from several TCI clubs; run a convention each year to conduct the business of the Corporation with representatives of all clubs; and select a new Miss Tall International, the official public representative and good will ambassador for TCI."

== In popular culture ==
The 2019 Netflix movie Tall Girl has a scene of parents hosting a meeting of the Tall group in their home for the benefit of their daughter, the titular tall girl.

== See also ==
- Kae Sumner Einfeldt, Founder of the first tall club and inspiration for the affiliation
- Miss Tall International, TCI's designated spokesperson and ambassador, chosen annually by pageant
- Little People of America
- List of tallest people
