= Kae Sumner Einfeldt =

- Born: May 19, 1916
- Died: September 27, 1996 (aged 80)
- Known for: Founder of Tall Clubs International
- Height: 6 ft 3 in (191 cm)

Kae Sumner Einfeldt (May 19, 1916 – September 27, 1996) was the founder of the world's first modern tall club, the California Tip Toppers Club, which led to the formation of other tall clubs around the world, and Tall Clubs International. Kae was 6 feet 3 inches tall.

== Early years and career ==
Kae was born Katherine Ruth Sumner on May 19, 1916, as the only child of Roy Calvin Sumner and Ada (Frasier) Sumner in Oakland, California. The family moved a number of times, living in Riverside, Pasadena, and San Diego.

An accomplished artist, by 1938 Kae was employed by Walt Disney Studio in the Ink & Paint and Special Effects departments. Her work included painting dwarfs for the film Snow White and the Seven Dwarfs (1937 film). During her lifetime she worked in six studios, including the Popeye studio, and also worked with the War Department during World War II.

== The tall club movement ==
Kae had long had trouble with knocking her knees under desks, and in cafeterias and buses. By 1938 she had had enough. Friends recall Kae uttering, "There ought to be a club for tall people." On impulse she approached E.V. Durling, a columnist at the Los Angeles Times, with an article about the problems of being tall. She then spoke to Editor-in-Chief Robert White, who was very receptive to her and suggested she proceed with the article. On March 20, 1938 a two-page article penned and illustrated by Kae appeared in the Times Sunday Magazine under the name Kae Krysler. Kae ended the article asking area tall people to contact her, and perhaps get together to discuss the problems of being tall.

On May 1, 1938, Kae met with eight other tall people who responded to the article, and by the end of the evening, they had formed the "Longfellows Club", which later became the California Tip Toppers Club (CTTC), North America's first club for tall people. It is the oldest still existing Tall Club in the world (see above). Subsequent publicity spread the idea of tall clubs; in 1939 the Greater Kansas City Skyliners club was formed. In the June 24, 1940 issue of Life Magazine, an article entitled Life Goes to a Tip Toppers Party appeared, and tall clubs started appearing from coast to coast.

Kae was invited to appear on the November 8, 1940 broadcast of Ripley's Believe It Or Not! show. Mr. Ripley challenged Kae to produce a New York Tip Toppers club; three days later, Ripley's audience included two rows of tip toppers (later called the New York Stratoliners). The New York Tip Toppers Club was formed in April 1939 by George Mann (6'4") of the Barto and Mann comedic dance act then performing with Hellzapoppin. The Club was patterned on the California Tip Toppers Club.

The clubs 'grew' rapidly following World War II. In 1945 there were 60 clubs in the United States and Canada.

Beginning July 17, 1947 the first convention of tall clubs was held in Hollywood, California hosted by CTTC; fifteen clubs from around the United States and Canada were in attendance:

- California Tip Toppers Club
- Greater Kansas City Skyliners
- Pittsburgh Tip Toppers
- New York Stratoliners
- Paramount Tall Club of Chicago
- Tall Girl's Club of Chicago
- Tower Club of Philadelphia
- New Jersey Tip Topper Club
- Texas Tip Toppers of Dallas
- Golden Gate Tip Toppers
- Skyscrapers Club of Cleveland
- Vancouver Tip Toppers Club
- St. Louis Tip Toppers
- Houston Higher Ups
- Seattle Timberliners
- Boston Beanstalkers

Miss Tip Topper of 1947 was also crowned from among the various club queens in attendance. This became the initial basis for the American Affiliation of Tall Clubs (AATC).

By 1966 the affiliation had grown to the point where a new name was needed; the name "Tall Clubs International and Miss Tall Universe" was unanimously adopted by the delegates; incorporation occurred by 1967. The name was amended in 1974 to become "Tall Clubs International and Miss Tall International, Incorporated".

The development of tall furnishings was one major goal of the members. They wrote letters, made many phone calls, and visited business to encourage them to lower the cost of custom-made items. From that goal, the King Size Mattress was created.

Kae stayed active in the tall clubs and TCI from their inception, and attended most of the conventions through the rest of her life.

As of 1989 more than 200 tall clubs were in operation in the US and Canada, though not all at the same time. Tall Club International (TCI) consists of 54 member clubs. There are tall clubs in Austria, Czechoslovakia, Denmark, Ireland, Germany, the Netherlands, Sweden and Switzerland which have not affiliated with TCI because their minimum height requirements vary from TCI's standards of 5'10" for women and 6'2" for men measured in stocking feet.

== Later years ==
George W. Einfeldt met Kae via the California Tip Toppers Club; they were married in 1948, and later adopted a daughter Sherri-Lynn. George died in 1968.

In the night of September 27, 1996, Kae died in her sleep at the Pacific Coast Manor nursing home in Capitola, California. Kae is survived by a granddaughter, Brandi.

== See also ==
- Tall Clubs International
- Miss Tall International
