= Relative gain array =

The relative gain array (RGA) is a classical widely used method for determining the best input-output pairings for multivariable process control systems. It has many practical open-loop and closed-loop control applications and is relevant to analyzing many fundamental steady-state closed-loop system properties such as stability and robustness.

== Definition ==
Given a linear time-invariant (LTI) system represented by a nonsingular matrix $\mathrm{G}$, the relative gain array (RGA) is defined as

$$\mathrm{R} = \Phi (\mathrm{G}) = \mathrm{G} \circ {(\mathrm{G}^{-1})}^T.$$

where $\circ$ is the elementwise Hadamard product of the two matrices, and the transpose operator (no conjugate) is necessary even for complex $\mathrm{G}$. Each ${i,j}$ element $\mathrm{R}_{i,j}$ gives a scale invariant (unit-invariant) measure of the dependence of output $j$ on input $i$.

== Properties ==
The following are some of the linear-algebra properties of the RGA:

1. Each row and column of $\Phi (\mathrm{G})$ sums to 1.
2. For nonsingular diagonal matrices $\mathrm{D}$ and $\mathrm{E}$, $\Phi (\mathrm{G}) = \Phi (\mathrm{D} \mathrm{G} \mathrm{E})$.
3. For permutation matrices $\mathrm{P}$ and $\mathrm{Q}$, $\mathrm{P}\Phi (\mathrm{G})\mathrm{Q} = \Phi (\mathrm{P} \mathrm{G} \mathrm{Q})$.
4. Lastly, $\Phi (\mathrm{G}^{-1}) = \Phi (\mathrm{G})^T = \Phi {(\mathrm{G}^T)}$.

The second property says that the RGA is invariant with respect to nonzero scalings of the rows and columns of $\mathrm{G}$, which is why the RGA is invariant with respect to the choice of units on different input and output variables. The third property says that the RGA is consistent with respect to permutations of the rows or columns of $\mathrm{G}$.

== Generalizations ==
The RGA is often generalized in practice to be used when $\mathrm{G}$ is singular, e.g., non-square, by replacing the inverse of $\mathrm{G}$ with its Moore–Penrose inverse (pseudoinverse). However, it has been shown that the Moore–Penrose pseudoinverse fails to preserve the critical scale-invariance property of the RGA (#2 above) and that the unit-consistent (UC) generalized inverse must therefore be used.
