= Dwarf Athletic Association of America =

American athletic organization

DAAA Logo

The Dwarf Athletic Association of America (DAAA) is an American athletic organization that sponsors and organizes athletic events for people with dwarfism.

== History ==
Founded in 1985, the DAAA's purpose is to develop, promote, and provide little people athletes with organized and quality amateur athletics in a supportive environment. DAAA holds the idea that there is a lack of sports opportunity for little people in America and they look to fill the void and provide an environment that rewards dwarf athletes by taking their potential seriously and giving them a realistic opportunity to succeed through hard work and dedication. The DAAA also believes that "the dream of honoring America in international competition should be as real for a dwarf athlete as it is for any other in the country."

== Mission ==
According to its website, the DAAA's mission is: "To encourage people with dwarfism to participate in sports regardless of their level of skills." It is also to help dwarfs realize their true potential in life.

== Sports and eligibility ==
The DAAA organizes and promotes dwarf athletics in a variety of sports for a variety of ages. They also sponsor clinics and development events around the United States.

=== List of amateur sports ===
The DAAA has athletes that compete in the following sports:

- Track and field
- Badminton
- Basketball
- Boccia
- Football
- Soccer
- Swimming
- Table tennis
- Weightlifting
- Volleyball
- Shooting
- Archery
- Car Racing

=== Eligibility ===
Due to the medical nature of dwarfism, the DAAA has certain requirements that must be met for eligibility. These requirements include (but are not limited to):

- Disproportionate dwarves (usually with achondrodysplasia who are less than (or equal to) five feet tall) and proportionate dwarves with a height that is less than or equal to four feet ten inches are usually eligible to compete
- All participants must meet a special medical clearance and file a current medical release form (except those participating in Boccia)
- All athletes must also sign a "Waiver and Release of Liability and Publicity Release" in order to participate

== Events ==
In addition to the development of youth and adult dwarf athletes, the DAAA also organizes a number of local, regional, and national events to promote healthy competition among other little people.

=== National Dwarf Games ===
The National Dwarf Games is a yearly amateur competition organized by the DAAA (and local organizations) and only open to little people. Athletes are divided on the basis of age, gender, and functional ability classifications. There are also events for ages 8–15, but these are meant to emphasize the achievement of personal best. Also, youth seven and under can participate in special (non-competitive) programs where everybody wins. In 2007, the National Dwarf Games were held in Seattle, Washington, in conjunction with the 2007 Little People of America conference.

=== World Dwarf Games ===
The World Dwarf Games are an international competition (similar to the Paralympics) that allows little people to compete at an international level. The games are held every four years at locations around the world. Athletes that have shown outstanding athleticism during the National Dwarf Games are chosen to participate in the World Dwarf Games.

The World Dwarf Games were first held in Chicago in 1993 and were hosted by the DCCC. During this inaugural games, the International Dwarf Athletic Federation (IDAF) was conceived. Since then, the World Dwarf Games have been held every four years at cities around the world.

Edition	Year	City	Host	Countries	Athletes
1	1993	Chicago	United States	10	165
2	1997	Peterborough	England	6	83
3	2001	Toronto	Canada	8	250
4	2005	Paris	France	14	136
5	2009	Belfast	Northern Ireland	12	250
6	2013	East Lansing	United States	16	395
7	2017	Guelph	Canada		
8	2023	Cologne	Germany		
9	2027		Australia		

- https://worlddwarfgames2017.org/event-history/
- 2013 medal table and results : http://www.2013worlddwarfgames.org/index.php/sports/sports-grid.html
- 2013 World Dwarf Games consists of almost 400 athletes from 16 countries in 16 sports.
- The 7th World Dwarf Games 2017 – University of Guelph, August 5 to 12, 2017 : https://worlddwarfgames2017.org/

== Affiliations ==
The DAAA maintains affiliations and relationships with the following organizations:

- United States Olympic Committee
- America's Athletes with Disabilities
- United States Disabled Sports Team
- International Dwarf Athletic Association
- Little People of America
- Billy Barty Foundation
- Dwarf Sports Association UK

== In the media ==
The DAAA has been featured in a number of episodes on the American television series Little People, Big World on TLC. The show, centered around the dwarf members of the Roloff family, has included a number of episodes where members of the family have participated in events sponsored by the DAAA. Zach Roloff competes in soccer regularly, and in 2006, Amy competed in Bocce.

== See also ==
- Little People of America
- World Dwarf Games
