= Bundesverband Kleinwüchsige Menschen und ihre Familien =

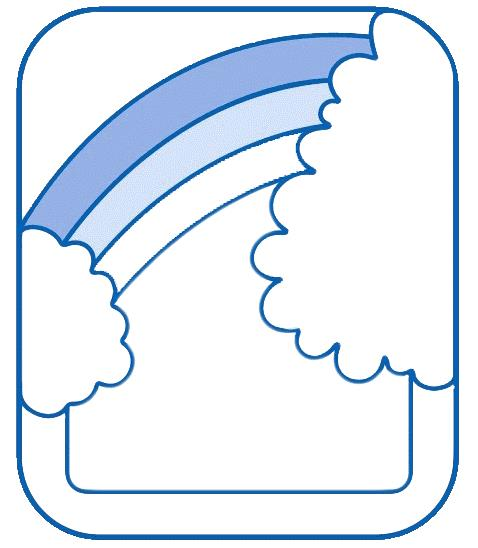
Logo

The Bundesverband Kleinwüchsige Menschen und ihre Familien e.V. (BKMF e.V.) is a German organization in the field of health-oriented, family-oriented self-help. It advocates for the interests and concerns of short statured individuals and their families in Germany.

In 2013, the association had over 3,500 members. Since there are various causes for dwarfism, the spectrum of diagnoses among the members is also diverse.

== History ==
The origins of the association date back to the early 1980s. At that time, parents of dwarfs began to meet with the goal of networking and exchanging experiences and information. The initiative came from Ruzena and Karl-Heinz Klingebiel and the psychologist Ortrun Schott.

The association was initially founded on February 16, 1988, as the "Elterngruppe kleinwüchsiger Kinder e.V." (Parents' Group of Dwarf Children). In the same year, the first dwarfism forum was held in Mauloff. The first counseling and office were established in Bremen in 1991, staffed with a full-time administrative professional and a management team.

An initiative with the Vereinigung Kleinwüchsiger Menschen (VKM) achieved a nationwide ban on dwarf tossing in 1992. In May, an international dwarfism forum took place in Bremen. A year later, the members decided to rename the association to "Bundesverband Kleinwüchsiger Menschen und ihre Familien e.V." (Federal Association of Dwarf People and Their Families).

Successes in cooperation with other organizations and initiatives included the participation of BKMF in the founding of the Deutscher Behindertenrat (German Disability Council) and the Allianz Chronischer Seltener Erkrankungen (ACHSE e.V.) The significance of the association and its achievements were recognized in 2006 through the award of the Bundesverdienstkreuz (Federal Cross of Merit) to the founding chairman Karl-Heinz Klingebiel.

In 2007, the German Center for Dwarfism Issues was opened. Part of it is a dwarf-friendly model apartment where affected individuals can test various technical aids to determine their helpfulness.

The "Generationswechsel" (Generational Change) project pursued a goal of future-oriented orientation in 2013. Young, dwarf adults who have been associated with the association since childhood are increasingly involved in responsible positions. Since March 17, 2013, Patricia Carl-Innig has been the chairperson of the association. She succeeded Doris Michel, who had held the position for 12 years.

== Hosting the World Dwarf Games ==
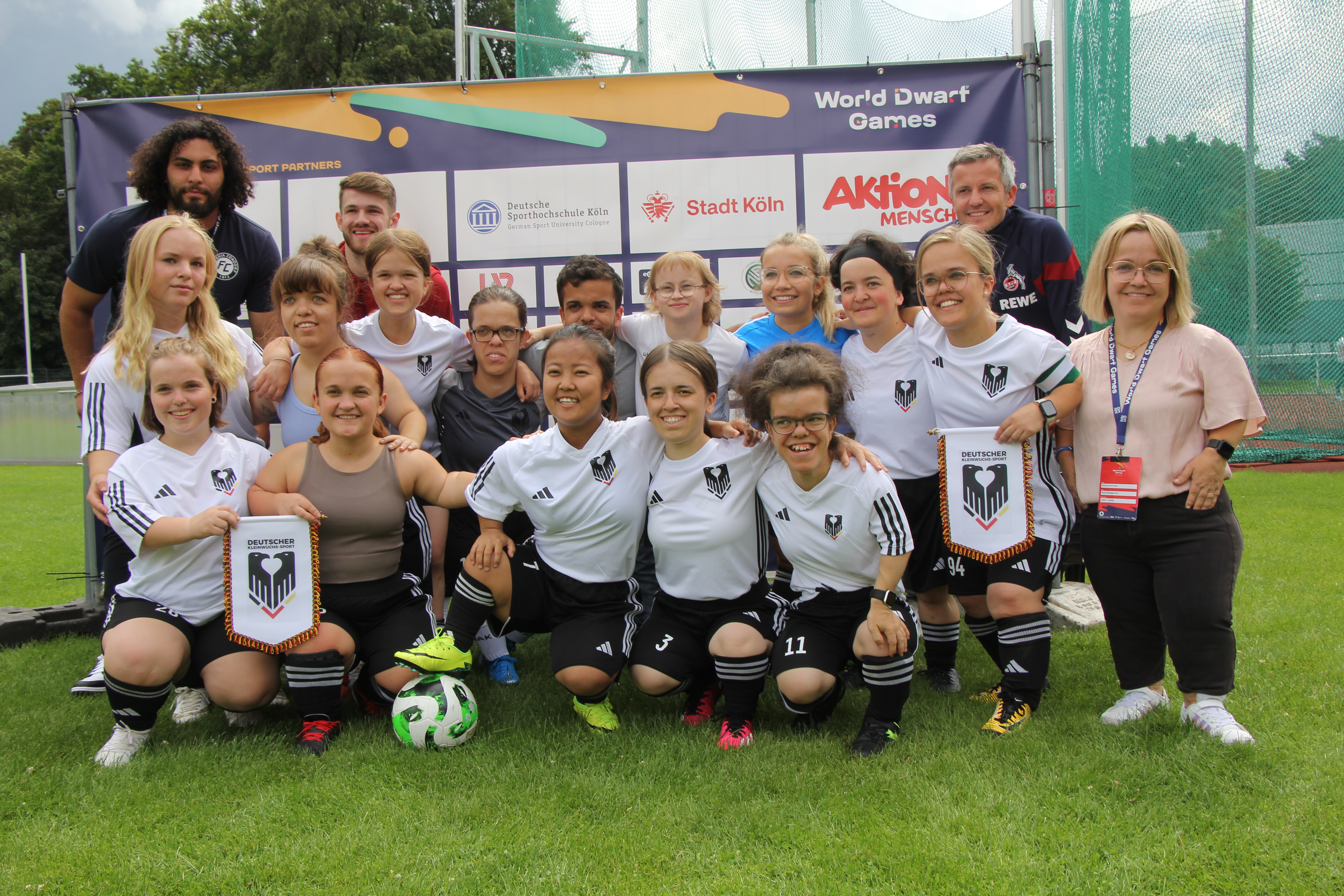
Team Germany with players of FC Koln during the World Dwarf Games

In 2023, the association hosted the 8th World Dwarf Games in Cologne, with more than 500 athletes from 25 countries participating.

== Goals and tasks ==
According to its articles of association, the association is exclusively committed to the interests of dwarf individuals, always with the idea of self-help in mind. This results in the following tasks:

- Support of members through information, advice, care, and empowerment in all matters related to dwarfism.
- Psychosocial empowerment of those affected.
- Promotion of integration into society.
- Reduction of existing prejudices.
- Compilation, systematization, and dissemination of knowledge specific to dwarfism.

To achieve this, there is a nationwide counseling network consisting of full-time staff in the counseling office in Bremen and volunteer counselors from the eight regional associations.

== Structure of the association ==
In addition to the legally required organizational structure, the association regulates in its articles of association the further internal organization to achieve the defined purpose and tasks. It is clearly stipulated that the association's work and member support should primarily take place in the regional associations, working groups, and committees.

=== Regional associations ===
Within the Federal Association, there are 8 regional associations, which are free to subdivide regionally. Some of them also have the status of an independent association. The regional associations also organize events locally.

=== Working groups ===
Eight working groups facilitate communication among affected individuals. Each group is dedicated to a specific form of dwarfism, such as Achondroplasia, Diastrophic Dysplasia, Hypochondroplasia, Phosphate Diabetes, and Congenital Spondyloepiphyseal Dysplasia. One group covers the Silver-Russell Syndrome, Small for Gestational Age, and Growth Hormone Deficiency, while another addresses Tricho-Rhino-Phalangeal Syndromes and Multiple Hereditary Exostoses. These diverse working groups reflect the broad spectrum of different diagnoses among the members.

However, not every diagnosis has a dedicated working group, as some conditions are so rare that there are fewer than 10 affected individuals nationwide. Nevertheless, the focus is on fostering connections among affected individuals for exchange of experiences and knowledge.

=== Committees ===
There are three committees: "Young People," "Parents," and "Adult Dwarfs," aiming to provide support tailored to each life stage.

=== Advisory boards ===
The board can appoint advisory boards for professional and scientific advice. Currently, these include the Scientific Advisory Board, which actively contributes to publications and provides guidance when information material needs updating based on newer scientific insights, and the Elder Council.

== Memberships ==
The Bundesverband Kleinwüchsige Menschen und ihre Familien is a member of various organizations, including the Bundesarbeitsgemeinschaft Selbsthilfe, Allianz Chronischer Seltener Erkrankungen, the European Organisation for Rare Diseases (EURORDIS), the Deutsches Rotes Kreuz (German Red Cross, State Association Bremen, as a cooperating member), and the Deutscher Behindertenrat (German Disability Council).

== Publications ==
The association publishes the quarterly member magazine "betrifft kleinwuchs," featuring current internal association information, personal experiences, articles on new research findings, or general information about the work of self-help. There is a significant effort in producing various informational materials, such as the "First Information on Dwarfism," on specific medical conditions (e.g., Achondroplasia, Hypochondroplasia, etc.), and the "Yellow Sheets," which provide compact, medically and scientifically founded, easily understandable explanations of individual diagnostic fields. Additionally, there are purely scientific publications.

The goal is not only to inform affected individuals and their families but also professionals such as doctors or physiotherapists. Therefore, there is continuous collaboration with medical specialists, and publications are created in cooperation with the association's Scientific Advisory Board.

== Projects and seminars ==
The association consistently carries out various projects related to dwarfism. Examples include the research project on the occupational situation of dwarfs since 1998, funded by the Federal Ministry of Labor and Social Affairs, or the traveling exhibition "Betrachtungsweisen" from 2008 to 2012.

In addition to project work, seminars are conducted for young people, volunteer counselors, as well as symposia and workshops for professionals. The largest event of this kind is the annual Kleinwuchsforum held on Ascension Day with up to 600 participants in Hohenroda.
