= Dwarf Sports Association UK =

The Dwarf Sports Association UK (DSAUK) aims to "make regular sporting opportunities accessible and enjoyable to ... everyone of restricted growth in the United Kingdom". The association was founded by Arthur Dean and fellow members of the Restricted Growth Association (RGA) at the October 1993 RGA Annual Conference. This followed Dean's participation in the first World Dwarf Games in Chicago, organised by the Dwarf Athletic Association of America (DAAA). In 2014 Arthur and Penny Dean were both honoured with OBEs for their work over many years supporting and developing sport for people with Dwarfism and Restricted growth.

The association has organised the UK National Dwarf Games since 1995. The 2014 event, in Birmingham and Wolverhampton, attracted about 200 athletes. In 2015 the association launched a national Sport and Physical Activity Survey, with the aim of improving opportunities for people of restricted growth to take part in sporting activities.

== See also ==
- Little People of America
