= Little People of Canada =

Canadian not-for-profit organization

Little People of Canada logo.

Little People of Canada is a not-for-profit organization, federally incorporated in Canada on December 7, 1984. The organization is concerned with the need for people of small stature (dwarfism) to be useful members of society through education, employment and social adjustment, and to focus public attention to the fact that the magnitude of any physical limitation is a function of attitude of both the small and the average-sized person and desire to assist in these matters. It helps connect and facilitate communication between little people organizations of the Canadian Provinces and Territories.

It is the second North American 'little people' association, preceded by Little People of America, founded in the United States in the 1950s.
