= Restricted Growth Association =

The Restricted Growth Association (RGA) is a UK charity that supports people with dwarfism (restricted growth).

The RGA was formed in 1970 by Charles Pocock, Martin Nelson and other individuals in the UK wanting to provide a support network for people with restricted growth (dwarfism). Initially known as the Association into Research of Restricted Growth, the charity aims to support all individuals and their families affected by skeletal dysplasia leading to short stature.

There are many different forms of dwarfism caused by genetic conditions, but the most common form of disproportionate short stature, causing about 70% of cases, is achondroplasia.

There are over 200 known genetic conditions that can lead to short stature (dwarfism). 80% of children born with one of these conditions are born to parents with no previous family history of genetic skeletal dysplasia. The RGA aims to provide support from the first diagnosis and right through the life of the individual.

The RGA's aims are to:

- Reduce social barriers
- Improve their quality of life
- Enhance the role in society of persons of restricted growth
- Lessen the fear and distress of families when a child with restricted growth is born
- Provide friendship, mutual support and encouragement for individuals and their families
- Develop an awareness of diversity and promote equality within the small people's community

In 2007, the RGA, supported by the Big Lottery Fund, commissioned a report into ‘Living with Restricted Growth’. The full report can be downloaded from the RGA website. The report covers people from all over the UK and whilst many participants have achondroplasia, there were also participants with many other conditions such as pseudoachondroplasa, diastrophic dysplasia, spondyloepiphyseal dysplasia and hypochondroplasia.

The RGA can provide links to Red Book inserts for children with achondroplasia and height charts are available online. Children with achondroplasia and other skeletal dysplasia's should not be monitored using the standard growth and development charts contained within the ‘Red Book’.

The RGA welcomes members who are under 4'10" as well as their families and other individuals and organisations that have a genuine interest in dwarfism. Events are held regularly around the country.

== See also ==
- List of restricted growth organisations around the world
