= Little People of America =

US non-profit organization

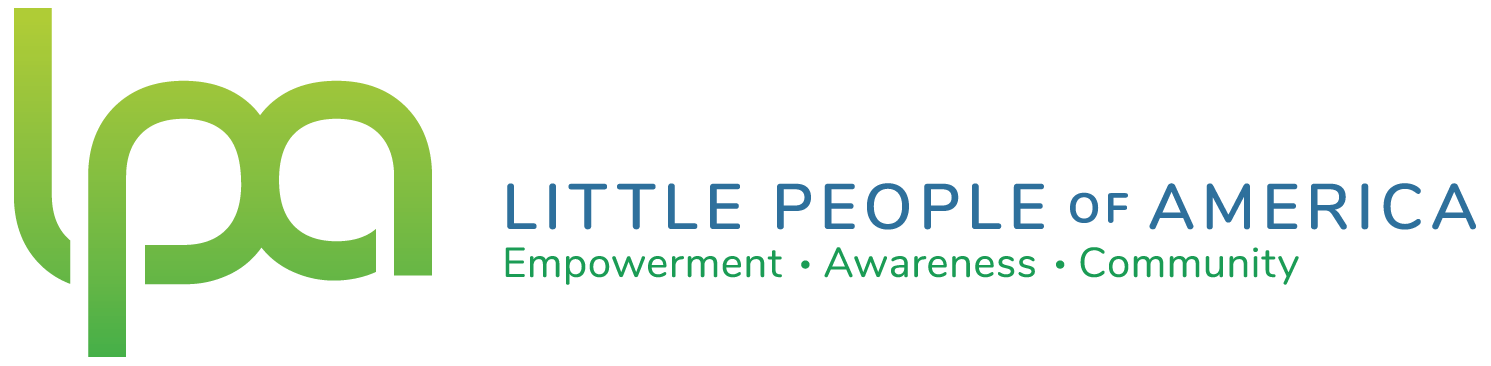
- Predecessor: Midgets of America; Midgets and Dwarfs of America
- Formation: 1957; 69 years ago
- Founder: Billy Barty
- Type: 501(c)(3)
- Tax ID no.: 94-2965067
- Legal status: non-profit organization
- Purpose: provides support, resources, and information to individuals with dwarfism and their families
- Headquarters: Sonoma, California, US
- Members: 7,500 (2023)
- Executive Director: Deb Himsel
- Website: www.lpaonline.org

Little People of America (LPA) is a 501(c)(3) non-profit organization which provides support, resources, and information to individuals with dwarfism and their families.

== Founding ==
LPA was founded in 1957 by actor Billy Barty when he informally called upon people of short stature to join him in a get-together in Reno, Nevada. The original association was known as Midgets of America until 1960. The name was later changed to Midgets and Dwarfs of America when the people with dwarfism complained that there were more dwarfs than midgets. That original meeting of 21 people evolved into Little People of America, a group which as of 2023 has more than 7,500 members. LPA has 73 local chapters which meet regularly as well as an annual weeklong conference. They publish a quarterly publication national newsletter titled LPA Today. LPA is the first North American "little people" organization, with the Little People of Canada incorporating in Canada in 1984.

== "Midget" as a slur ==
During the 2009 National Conference of the Little People of America, a press conference was held to make a public statement regarding the use of the word "midget", which is considered offensive by many people with dwarfism. The statement was made in response to an episode of Celebrity Apprentice which featured multiple uses of the word "midget" and justification of it by one of the celebrities, Jesse James. Members of the LPA filed a complaint with the Federal Communications Commission over the use of the word "midget" on broadcast television. The complaint said that "the word 'midget' is considered offensive to the dwarfism community and should not be seen or heard on TV or radio."

== Membership ==
Membership in LPA is limited to people 4 ft 10 in (147 cm) and under, or those diagnosed with any of the hundred plus forms of dwarfism, their families, or those who "demonstrate a well-founded interest in issues relating to Little People Matter, and dwarfism".

== See also ==
- List of dwarfism organisations
- Tall Clubs International
