= Dwarfism =

Small size of an organism, caused by growth deficiency or genetic mutations

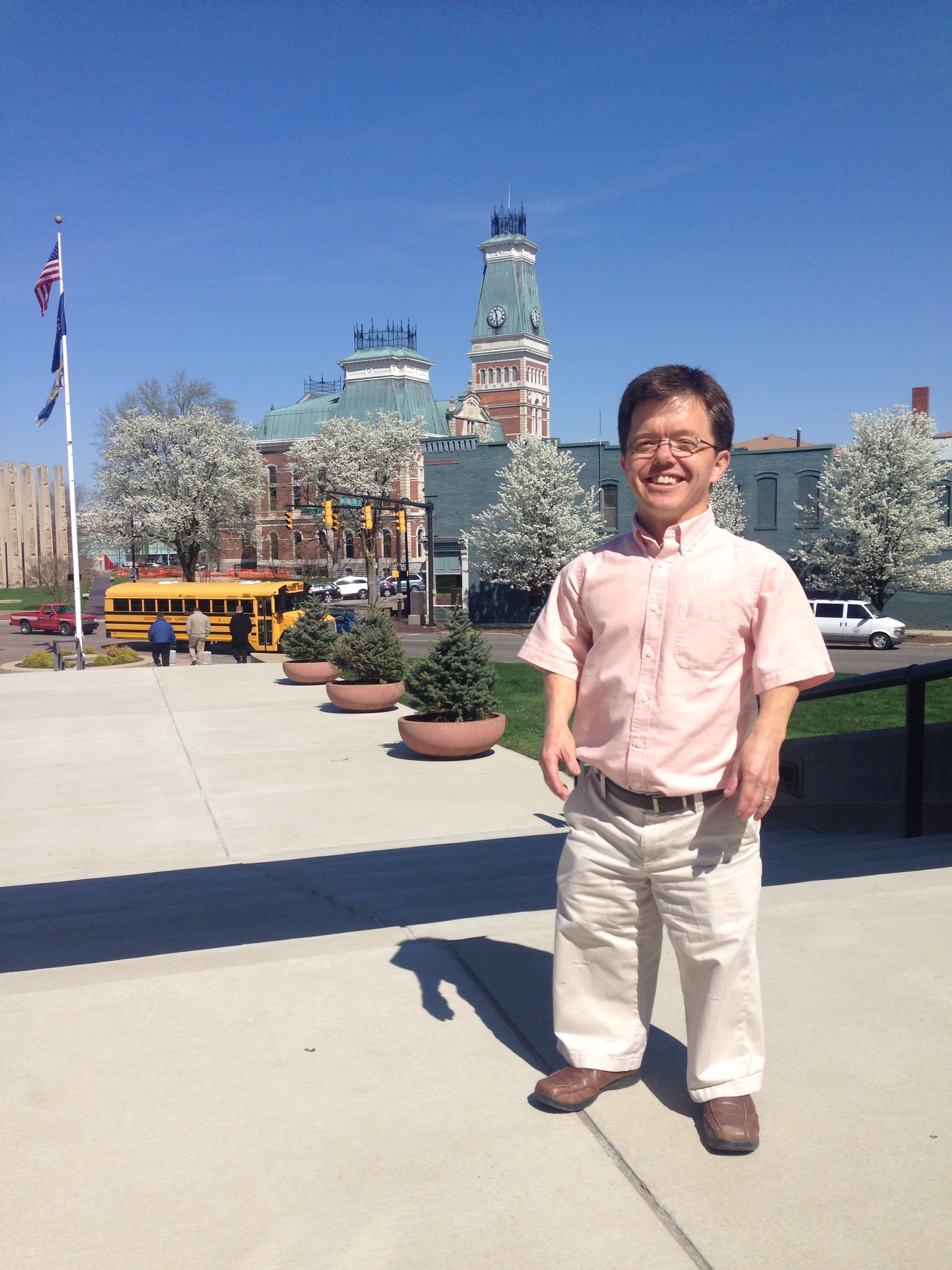
- A man in Columbus, Indiana, with achondroplasic dwarfism
- Pronunciation: /ˈdwɔːrfɪzəm/
- Specialty: Endocrinology, medical genetics
- Causes: Hyposecretion of growth hormone from pituitary gland (growth hormone deficiency), genetic disorders

Dwarfism is a condition marked by the unusually small size or short stature of individual animals. In humans, it is defined as an adult height of 147 centimetres (4 ft 10 in) or less, regardless of sex; the average adult height among people with dwarfism is 120 centimetres (4 ft). Disproportionate dwarfism is characterized by either short limbs or a short torso. In cases of proportionate dwarfism, both the limbs and torso are unusually small. Intelligence is usually normal, and most people with it have a nearly normal life expectancy. People with dwarfism can usually bear children, although there are additional risks to the mother and child depending upon the underlying condition.

The most common and recognizable form of dwarfism in humans (comprising 70% of cases) is achondroplasia, a genetic disorder whereby the limbs are diminutive. Growth hormone deficiency is responsible for most other cases. There are many other less common causes. Treatment of the condition depends on the underlying cause. Those with genetic disorders such as osteochondrodysplasia can sometimes be treated with surgery or physical therapy. Hormone disorders can also be treated with growth hormone therapy before the child's growth plates fuse. Individual accommodations, such as specialized furniture, are often used by people with dwarfism. Many support groups provide services to aid individuals and the discrimination they may face.

In addition to the medical aspect of the condition there are social aspects. For a person with dwarfism, height discrimination can lead to ridicule in childhood and discrimination in adulthood. In the United Kingdom, United States, Canada, Australia, and other English-speaking countries, labels that some people with dwarfism accept include dwarf (plural: dwarfs), little person (LP), or person of short stature (see terminology). Historically, the term midget was used to describe dwarfs (primarily proportionate); however, some now consider this term offensive.

== Signs and symptoms ==
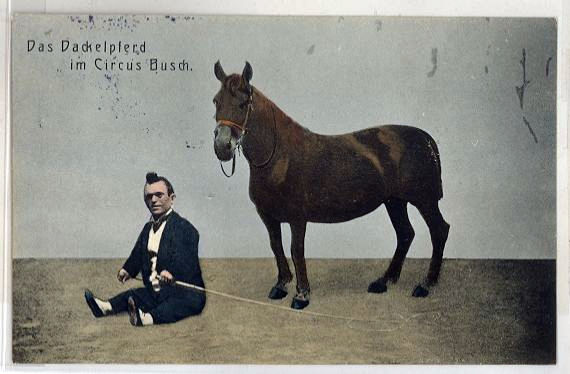
Dwarfism occurs in animals as well as humans; horses can have achondroplastic symptoms, as shown here next to a person with dwarfism. All small dog breeds exhibit dwarfism (the standard size of dogs, without interference from humans, is the same as that of the wolves).

Dwarfism has been defined as having an adult height of 147 centimetres (4 ft 10 in) or less, or alternatively, having a height of at least two standard deviations less than the mean of an individual's population, considering age, sex, and ancestry. There is a wide range of physical characteristics. Variations in individuals are identified by diagnosing and monitoring the underlying disorders. There may not be any complications outside adapting to their size. Short stature is a common replacement of the term 'dwarfism', especially in a medical context. However, those with mild skeletal dysplasias may not be affected by dwarfism. In some cases of untreated hypochondroplasia, males grow up to 165 cm (5 feet 5 inches). Though that is short in a relative context, it does not fall into the extreme ranges of the growth charts.

Disproportionate dwarfism is characterized by shortened limbs or a shortened torso. In achondroplasia one has an average-sized trunk with short limbs and a larger forehead. Facial features are often affected and individual body parts may have problems associated with them. Spinal stenosis, ear infection, and hydrocephalus are common. In case of spinal dysostosis, one has a small trunk, with average-sized limbs. Proportionate dwarfism is marked by a short torso with short limbs, thus leading to a height that is significantly below average. There may be long periods without any significant growth. Sexual development is often delayed or impaired into adulthood. This dwarfism type is caused by an endocrine disorder and not a skeletal dysplasia.

Physical effects of malformed bones vary according to the specific disease. Many involve joint pain caused by abnormal bone alignment, or from nerve compression. Early degenerative joint disease, exaggerated lordosis or scoliosis, and constriction of spinal cord or nerve roots can cause pain and disability. Reduced thoracic size can restrict lung growth and reduce pulmonary function. Some forms of dwarfism are associated with disordered function of other organs, such as the brain or liver, sometimes severely enough to be more of an impairment than the unusual bone growth. Mental effects also vary according to the specific underlying syndrome. In most cases of skeletal dysplasia, such as achondroplasia, mental function is not impaired. However, there are syndromes which can affect the cranial structure and growth of the brain, severely impairing mental capacity. Unless the brain is directly affected by the underlying disorder, there is little to no chance of mental impairment that can be attributed to dwarfism.

The psycho-social limitations of society may be more disabling than the physical symptoms, especially in childhood and adolescence, but people with dwarfism vary greatly in the degree to which social participation and emotional health are affected.

- Social prejudice against extreme shortness may reduce social and marital opportunities.
- Numerous studies have demonstrated reduced employment opportunities. Severe shortness is associated with lower income.
- Self-esteem may decline and family relationships may be affected.
- Extreme shortness (in the 60–90 cm or 2–3 feet range) can, if not accommodated for, interfere with activities of daily living, like driving or using countertops built for taller people. Other common attributes of dwarfism such as bowed knees and unusually short fingers can lead to back problems and difficulty in walking and handling objects.
- Children with dwarfism are particularly vulnerable to teasing and ridicule from classmates. Because dwarfism is relatively uncommon, children may feel isolated from their peers.

== Causes ==
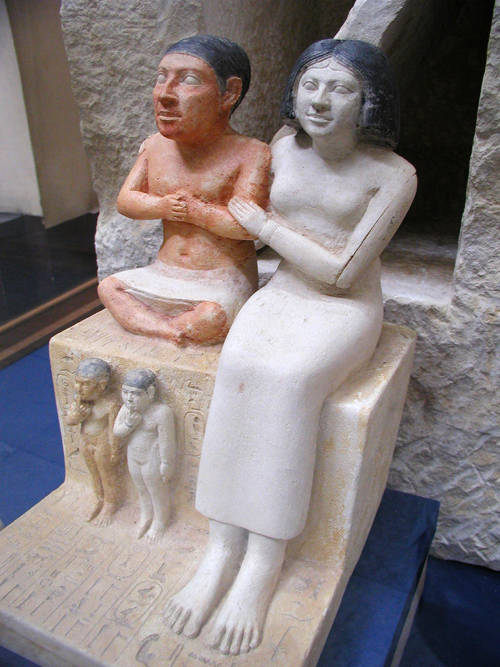
Seneb, court official and priest for the Ancient Egyptian rulers Khufu and Djedefre, with his wife Senetites and their children

Dwarfism can result from many medical conditions, each with its own separate symptoms and causes. Extreme shortness in humans with proportional body parts usually has a hormonal cause, such as growth hormone deficiency, once called pituitary dwarfism. Achondroplasia is responsible for the majority of human dwarfism cases, followed by spondyloepiphyseal dysplasia and diastrophic dysplasia.

=== Achondroplasia ===
The most recognizable and most common form of dwarfism in humans is achondroplasia, which accounts for 70% of dwarfism cases, and occurs in 4 to 15 out of 100,000 live births.

It produces rhizomelic short limbs, increased spinal curvature, and distortion of skull growth. In achondroplasia the body's limbs are proportionately shorter than the trunk (abdominal area), with a larger head than average and characteristic facial features. Achondroplasia is an autosomal dominant disorder caused by the presence of an altered allele in the genome. If a pair of achondroplasia alleles are present, the result is fatal, usually perinatally. Achondroplasia is a mutation in the fibroblast growth factor receptor 3. In the context of achondroplasia, this mutation causes FGFR3 to become constitutively active, inhibiting bone growth.

=== Growth hormone deficiency ===
Growth hormone deficiency (GHD) is a medical condition in which the body produces insufficient growth hormone. Growth hormone, also called somatotropin, is a polypeptide hormone which stimulates growth and cell reproduction. If this hormone is lacking, stunted or even halted growth may become apparent. Children with this disorder may grow slowly and puberty may be delayed by several years or indefinitely. Growth hormone deficiency has no single definite cause. It can be caused by mutations of specific genes, damage to the pituitary gland, Turner's syndrome, poor nutrition, or even stress (leading to psychogenic dwarfism). Laron syndrome (growth hormone insensitivity) is another cause. Those with growth hormone issues tend to be proportionate.

=== Metatropic dysplasia ===
Metatropic means "changing form" and refers to this form of skeletal dysplasia as there is an abnormality in the growth plates. Skeletal changes continue over time and may need surgical intervention to help protect the lungs. Symptoms starting at birth may be mild or can be fatal. There are recognizable features in individuals with this genetic disorder. Some are short stature, narrow chest, "facial features such as a prominent forehead, underdevelopment of the upper jaw, cheekbones and eye sockets (midface hypoplasia), and a squared-off jaw." It is considered a more severe skeletal dysplasia, but is very rare, with the exact number of those affected unknown. Prognosis is largely on a case-by-case basis depending on the severity, and life expectancy may not be impacted unless there are respiratory complications.

=== Other ===
Other causes of dwarfism are spondyloepiphyseal dysplasia congenita, diastrophic dysplasia, pseudoachondroplasia, hypochondroplasia, Noonan syndrome, primordial dwarfism, Cockayne syndrome, Kniest dysplasia, Turner syndrome, osteogenesis imperfecta (OI), and hypothyroidism. Severe shortness with skeletal distortion also occurs in several of the mucopolysaccharidoses and other storage disorders. Hypogonadotropic hypogonadism may cause proportionate, yet temporary, dwarfism. NPR2 disproportionate dwarfism was discovered recently and is caused by a mutant gene.

== Diagnosis ==
Dwarfism is often diagnosed in childhood on the basis of visible symptoms. A physical examination can usually suffice to diagnose certain types of dwarfism, but genetic testing and diagnostic imaging may be used to determine the exact condition. In a person's youth, growth charts that track height can be used to diagnose subtle forms of dwarfism that have no other striking physical characteristics.

Short stature or stunted growth during youth is usually what brings the condition to medical attention. Skeletal dysplasia is usually suspected because of obvious physical features (e.g., unusual configuration of face or shape of skull), because of an obviously affected parent, or because body measurements (arm span, upper to lower segment ratio) indicate disproportion. Bone X-rays are often key to diagnosing a specific skeletal dysplasia, but are not the sole diagnostic tool. Most children with suspected skeletal dysplasias are referred to a genetics clinic for diagnostic confirmation and genetic counseling. Since about the year 2000, genetic tests for some of the specific disorders have become available.

During an initial medical evaluation of shortness, the absence of disproportion and other clues listed above usually indicates causes other than bone dysplasias.

=== Classification ===
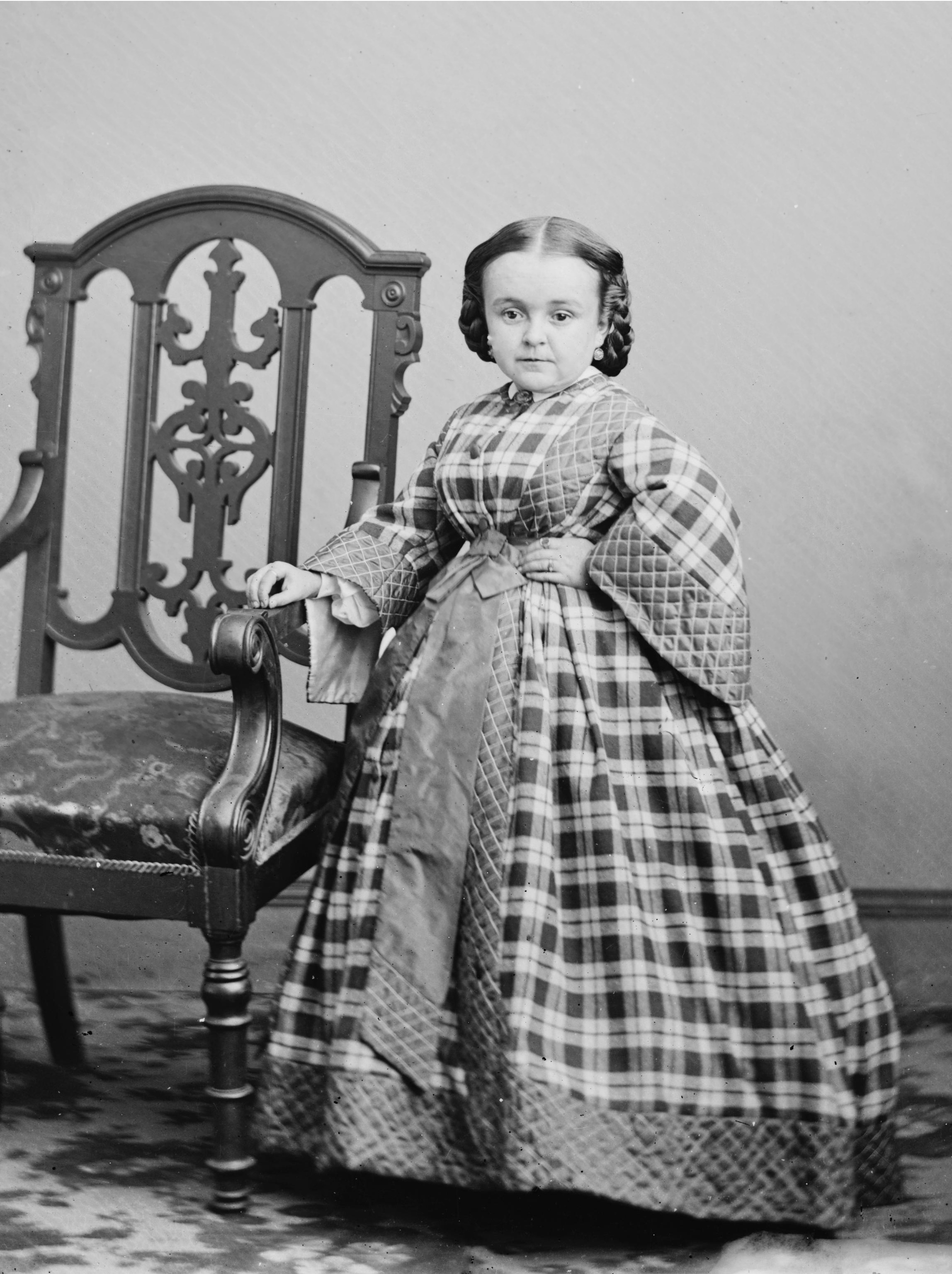
Lavinia Warren, an actress with pituitary dwarfism (growth hormone deficiency)

In men and women, the sole requirement for being considered a dwarf is having an adult height of 147 cm (4 ft 10 in) or less, and it is almost always sub-classified with respect to the underlying condition that is the cause of the short stature. Dwarfism is usually caused by a genetic variant; achondroplasia is caused by a mutation on chromosome 4. If dwarfism is caused by a medical disorder, the person is referred to by the underlying diagnosed disorder. Disorders causing dwarfism are often classified by proportionality. Disproportionate dwarfism describes disorders that cause unusual proportions of the body parts, while proportionate dwarfism results in a generally uniform stunting of the body.

Disorders that cause dwarfism may be classified according to one of hundreds of names, which are usually permutations of the following roots:

- location
  - rhizomelic = root, i.e., bones of the upper arm or thigh
  - mesomelic = middle, i.e., bones of the forearm or lower leg
  - acromelic = end, i.e., bones of hands and feet.
  - micromelic = entire limbs are shortened
- source
  - chondro = of cartilage
  - osteo = of bone
  - spondylo = of the vertebrae
  - plasia = form
  - trophy = growth

Examples include achondroplasia and chondrodystrophy.

== Prevention ==
Many types of dwarfism are currently impossible to prevent because they are genetically caused. Genetic conditions that cause dwarfism may be identified with genetic testing, by screening for the specific variations that result in the condition. However, due to the number of causes of dwarfism, it may be impossible to determine definitively if a child will be born with dwarfism. Dwarfism resulting from malnutrition or a hormonal abnormality may be treated with an appropriate diet or hormonal therapy. Growth hormone deficiency may be remedied via injections of human growth hormone during childhood.

== Management ==
Genetic mutations of most forms of dwarfism caused by bone dysplasia cannot be altered yet, so therapeutic interventions are typically aimed at preventing or reducing pain or physical disability, increasing adult height, or mitigating psychosocial stresses and enhancing social adaptation. Forms of dwarfism associated with the endocrine system may be treated using hormonal therapy. If the cause is prepubescent hyposecretion of growth hormone, supplemental growth hormone may correct the abnormality. If the receptor for growth hormone is itself affected, the condition may prove harder to treat. Hypothyroidism is another possible cause of dwarfism that can be treated through hormonal therapy. Injections of thyroid hormone can mitigate the effects of the condition, but lack of proportion may be permanent.

Pain and disability may be ameliorated by physical therapy, braces or other orthotic devices, or by surgical procedures. The only simple interventions that increase perceived adult height are dress enhancements, such as shoe lifts or hairstyle. Growth hormone is rarely used for shortness caused by bone dysplasias, since the height benefit is typically small (less than 5 cm [2 in]) and the cost high. The most effective means of increasing adult height by several inches is distraction osteogenesis, though availability is limited and the cost is high in terms of money, discomfort, and disruption of life. Most people with dwarfism do not choose this option, and it remains controversial. For other types of dwarfism, surgical treatment is not possible.

== Society and culture ==
=== Terminology ===
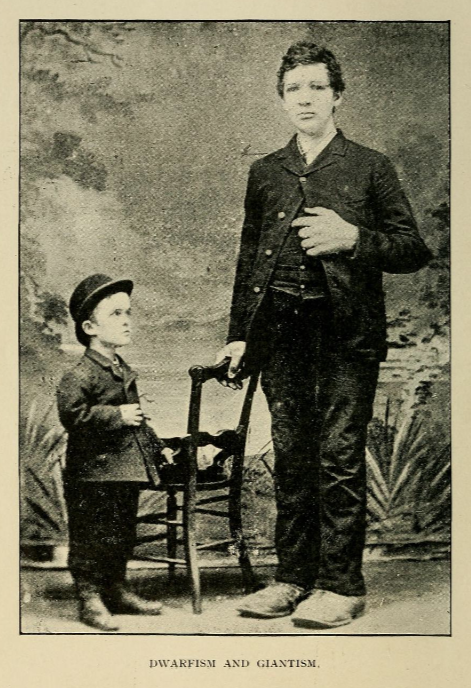
Comparative illustration from Talbot's 1889 medical treatise named Degeneracy: its causes, signs and results

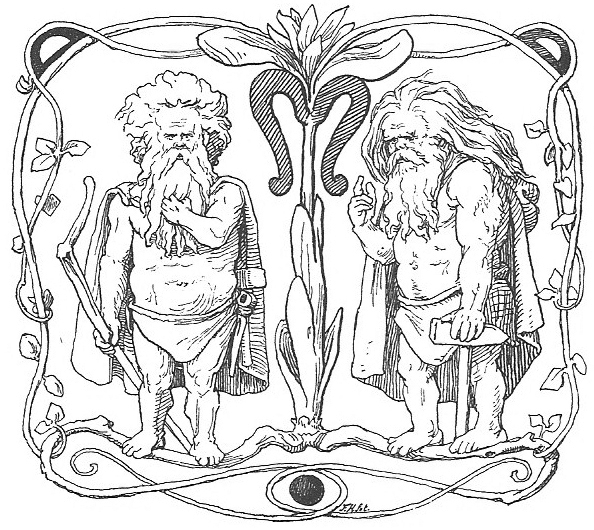
Two Norse dwarfs as depicted in a 19th-century edition of the Poetic Edda poem Völuspá (1895) by Lorenz Frølich

The appropriate term for describing a person of particularly short stature (or with the genetic condition achondroplasia) has developed euphemistically.

The noun dwarf stems from Old English: dweorg, originally referring to a being from Germanic mythology—a dwarf—that dwells in mountains and in the earth, and is associated with wisdom, smithing, mining, and crafting. The etymology of the word dwarf is contested, and scholars have proposed varying theories about the origins of the being, including that dwarfs may have originated as nature spirits or as beings associated with death, or as a mixture of concepts. Competing etymologies include a basis in the Indo-European root *dheur- (meaning 'damage'), the Indo-European root *dhreugh (whence modern Dutch droom 'dream' and bedrog 'deception'), and comparisons have been made with the Old Indian dhvaras (a type of demonic being). The being may not have gained associations with small stature until a later period.

The terms "little person", "LP" and "person of short stature" are the preferred terms of many of those with this disorder, and while some are uncomfortable with "dwarf" it remains a common term in some areas. However, the plural "dwarfs" as opposed to "dwarves" is generally preferred in the medical context, possibly because the plural "dwarves" was popularized by author J. R. R. Tolkien, describing a race of characters in his The Lord of the Rings books resembling Norse dwarfs. "Midget", whose etymology indicates a "tiny biting insect", came into prominence in the mid-19th century after Harriet Beecher Stowe used it in her novels Sunny Memories of Foreign Lands and Oldtown Folks where she described children and an extremely short man, respectively. Later some people of short stature considered the word to be offensive because it was the descriptive term applied to P. T. Barnum's dwarfs used for public amusement during the freak show era. It is also not considered accurate as it is not a medical term or diagnosis, though it is sometimes used as a slang term to describe those who are particularly short, whether or not they have dwarfism.

=== Participation ===
Individuals with dwarfism are capable of actively participating in various aspects of society. They have access to education and sports, and can pursue careers, engaging in a wide range of professions.

=== Acceptance ===
Individuals with dwarfism often face prejudice and stereotypes. Research by Klein (2019) has demonstrated that awareness of the stigmatization of this group can promote full participation in society. The research by Green and Pinter (2018) in the field of humor and social psychology can provide insights to reduce stereotypes and promote a more objective perception.

=== Accommodation ===
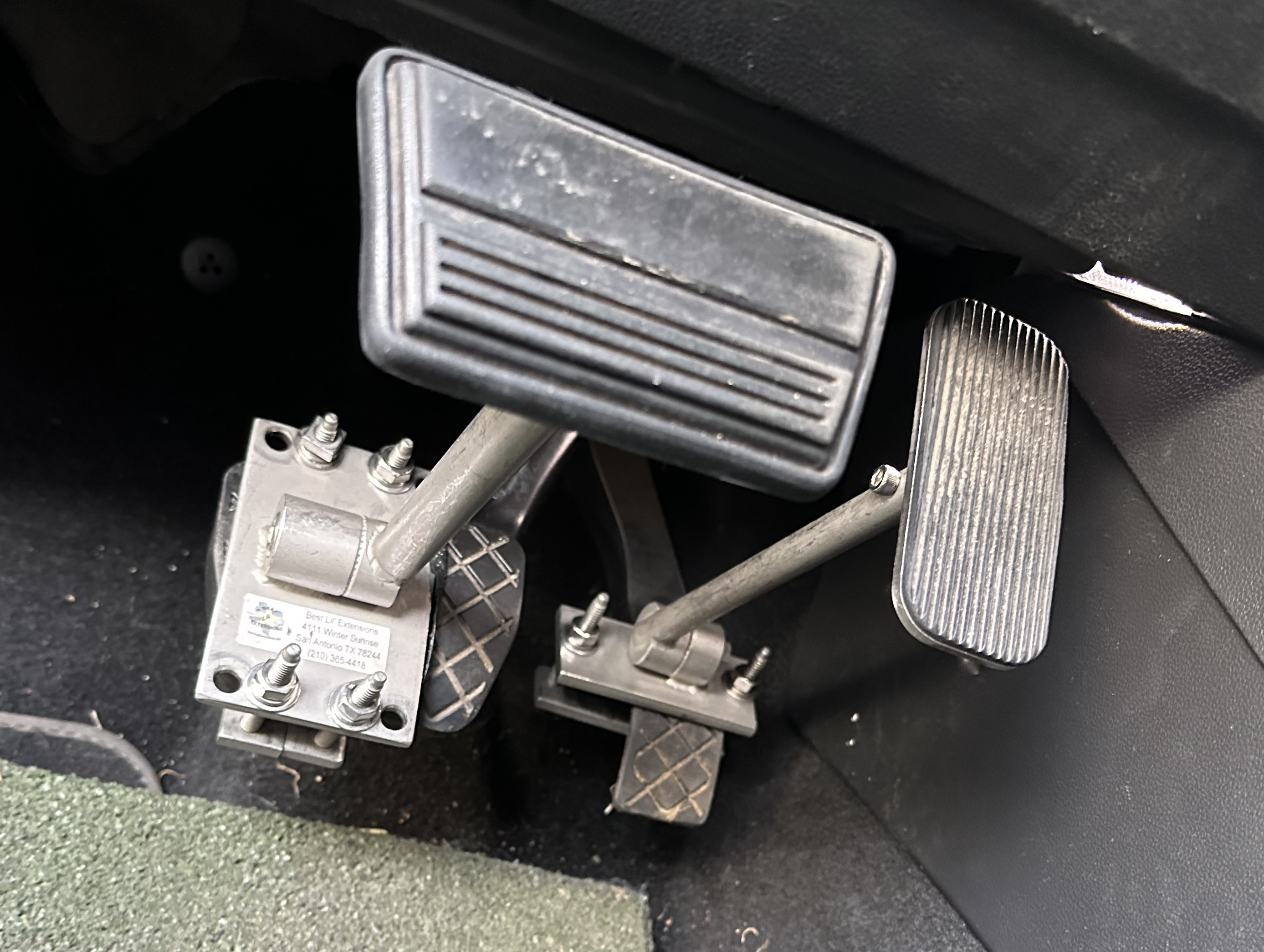
Pedal extenders for short statured individuals (skeletal dysplasia)

In daily life, little people face numerous obstacles because the environment is tailored to average-sized individuals. Some little people can only use ATMs, kitchens, toilets, and sinks with aids. Low stools and step stools play a special role, as they can be used in various ways to bridge the height difference. Stools are also useful as footrests while sitting, as the legs of short people dangle in the air when sitting on an average chair, which can be painful and uncomfortable in the long run and may hinder fine motor skills during work.

To be mobile, some individuals use customized scooters or bicycles, as it can be problematic, depending on the type of short stature, to walk longer distances. With specially adapted vehicles, most individuals of short stature can drive without further hindrances. Generally, pedal extensions and an individually adjusted seat at the correct height are required. Some individuals with dwarfism are tall enough to drive without pedal extensions. Usually, patients with skeletal dysplasia with limited mobility can receive allowances or grants for vehicle assistance through governmental help or rehabilitation providers.

=== Dwarf sports ===
Dwarfs have support and compete in sport by a number of organizations nationally and internationally. They are included in some events in the athletics at the Summer Paralympics.

The Dwarf Athletic Association of America and the Dwarf Sports Association UK provide opportunities for dwarfs to compete nationally and internationally in the Americas and Europe, respectively. The World Dwarf Games (WDG) are a multi-sport event for athletes of short stature. The WDG have been held every four years since 1993 and are the world's largest sporting event exclusively for athletes with dwarfism. The Dwarf Sports Association UK organizes between 5 and 20 events per month for athletes with restricted growth conditions in the UK. For instance, swimming and bicycling are often recommended for people with skeletal dysplasias, since those activities put minimal pressure on the spine.

Since its early days, professional wrestling has had the involvement of dwarf athletes. "Midget wrestling" had its heyday in the 1950s–'70s, when wrestlers such as Little Beaver, Lord Littlebrook, and Fuzzy Cupid toured North America, and Sky Low Low was the first holder of the National Wrestling Alliance's World Midget Championship. In the next couple of decades, more wrestlers became prominent in North America including foreign wrestlers like Japan's Little Tokyo. Although the term is seen by some as pejorative, many past and current midget wrestlers including Hornswoggle said they take pride in the term due to its history in the industry and its marketability.

=== Art and media depictions ===
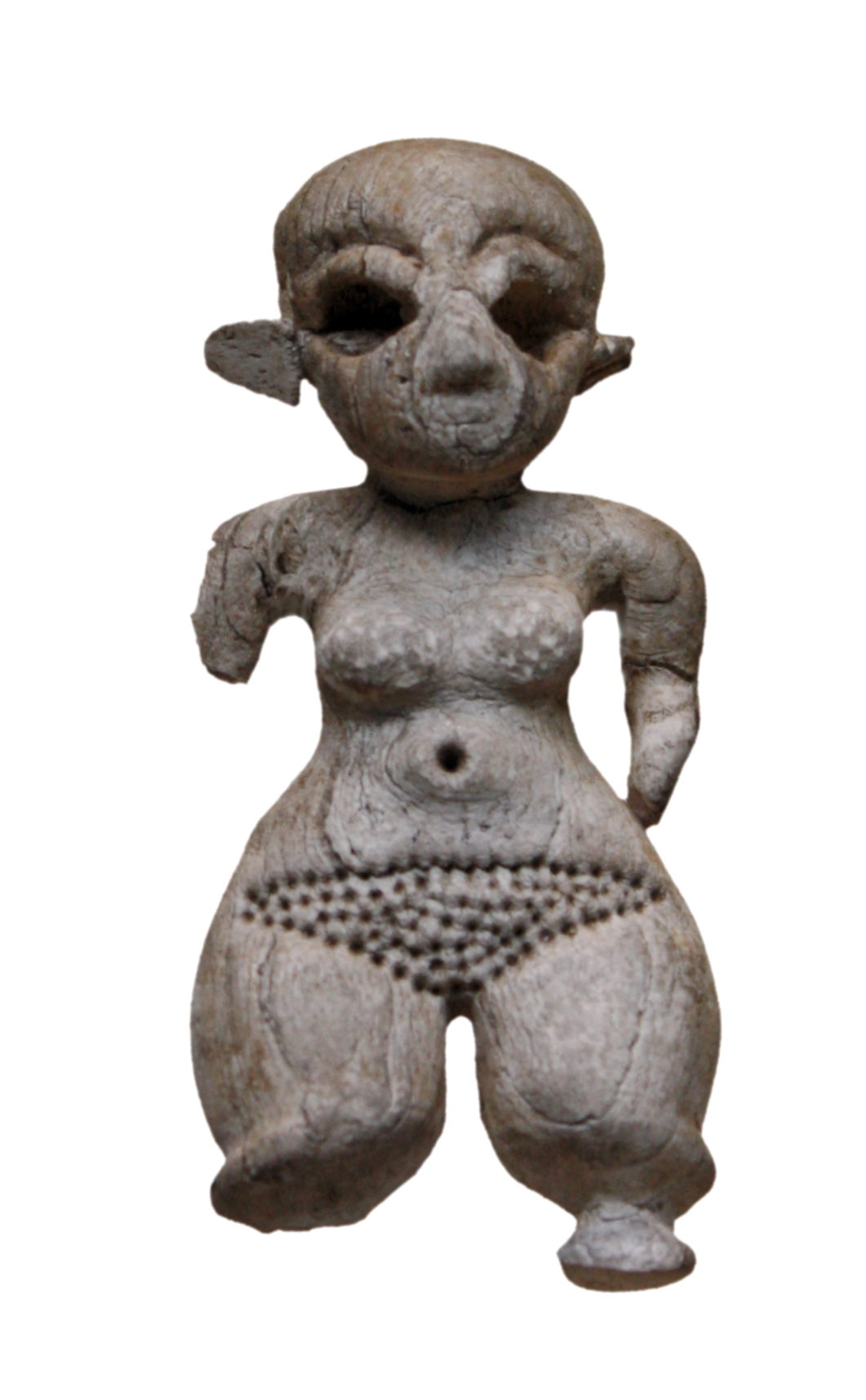
Ivory statuette of a woman with dwarfism, Gerzeh culture (Naqada II), in the Prehistoric Egypt era

In art, literature, and movies, dwarfs are rarely depicted as ordinary people who are very short but rather as a species apart. Novelists, artists, and moviemakers may attach special moral or aesthetic significance to their "apartness" or misshapenness.

Artistic representations of dwarfism are found on Greek vases and other ancient artifacts, including ancient Egyptian art in which dwarfs are likely to have been seen as a divine manifestation, with records indicating that they were able to reach high positions in society at the time.

The ancient Hindu text Bhagavata Purana devotes nine chapters to the legend of Vamana, the dwarf avatar of Vishnu.

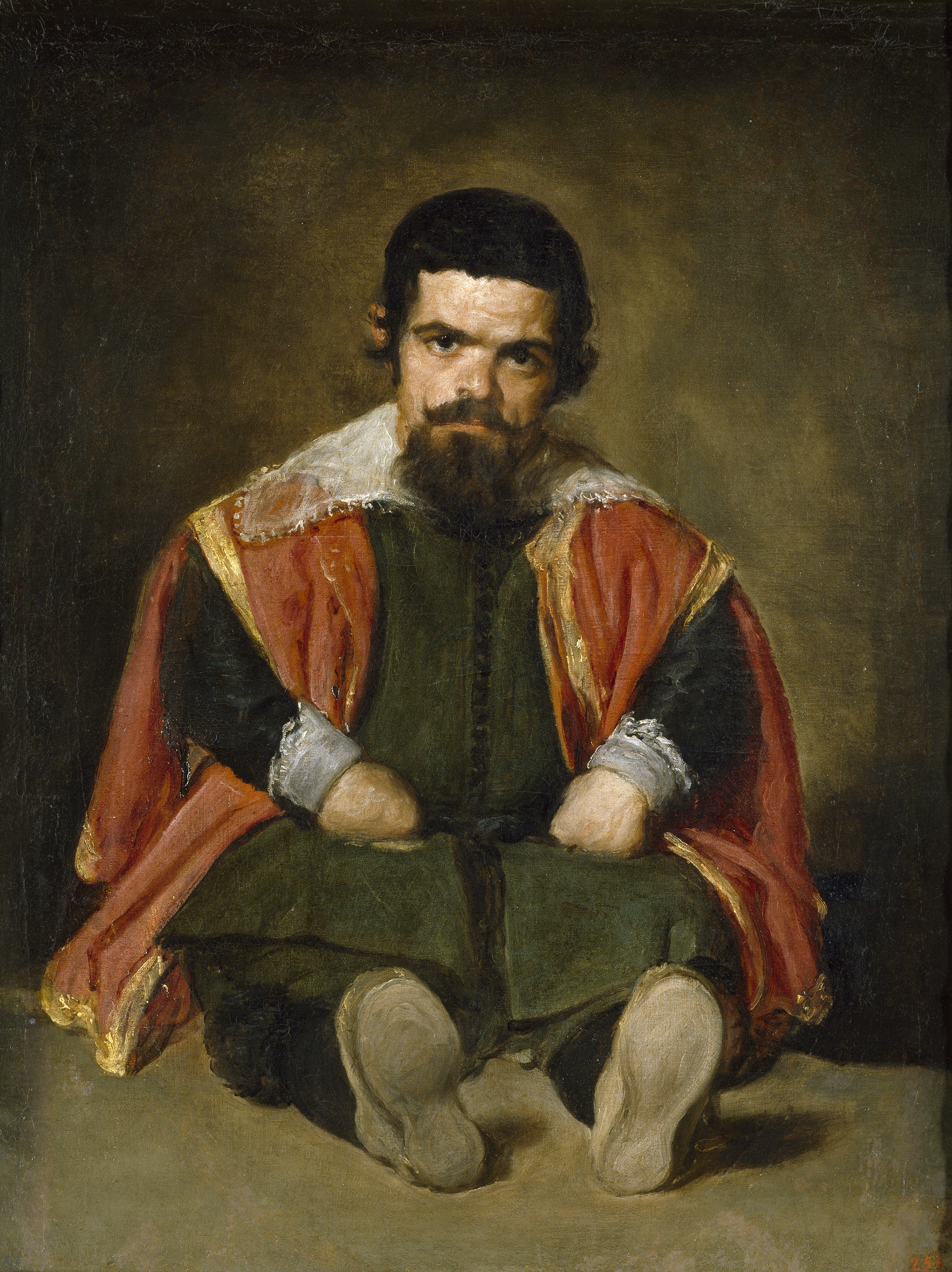
The Dwarf Don Sebastián de Morra, c. 1644 by Velázquez

Depictions of dwarfism are also found in European paintings and many illustrations. Many European paintings (especially Spanish) of the 16th–19th centuries depict dwarfs by themselves or with others. In the Talmud, it is said that the second born son of the Egyptian Pharaoh of the Bible was a dwarf. Recent scholarship has suggested that ancient Egyptians held dwarfs in high esteem. Several important mythological figures of the North American Wyandot nation are portrayed as dwarfs.

As popular media has become more widespread, the number of works depicting dwarfs have increased dramatically. Dwarfism is depicted in many books, films, and television series such as Willow, The Wild Wild West, The Man with the Golden Gun (and later parodied in Austin Powers), Gulliver's Travels by Jonathan Swift, The Wizard of Oz, Willy Wonka & the Chocolate Factory, Bad Santa, A Son of the Circus, Little People, Big World, The Little Couple, A Song of Ice and Fire (and its television adaptation Game of Thrones), Seinfeld, The Orator, In Bruges, The Tin Drum by Günter Grass, the short-lived reality show The Littlest Groom, and the films The Station Agent and Zero.

The Animal Planet television series Pit Boss features dwarf actor Shorty Rossi and his talent agency, "Shortywood Productions", which Rossi uses to provide funding for his pit bull rescue operation, "Shorty's Rescue". Rossi's three full-time employees, featured in the series, are little people and aspiring actors. In September 2014, Creative Business House along with Donnons Leur Une Chance, created the International Dwarf Fashion Show to raise awareness and boost self-confidence of people living with dwarfism. A number of reality television series on Lifetime, beginning with Little Women: LA in 2014, focused on showing the lives of women living with dwarfism in various cities around the United States.

== See also ==
- Dwarfs and pygmies in Ancient Egypt
- Dwarfism Awareness Month
- Dwarf-tossing
- Ellis–Van Creveld syndrome
- Gigantism
- Hypopituitarism
- Itabaianinha, a city in Brazil historically noted for its dwarf population
- Laron syndrome
- List of people with dwarfism
- List of dwarfism organisations
- List of the verified shortest people
- Midget
- Mulibrey nanism
- Pygmy peoples
- Dwarf rabbit
