= List of tallest people =

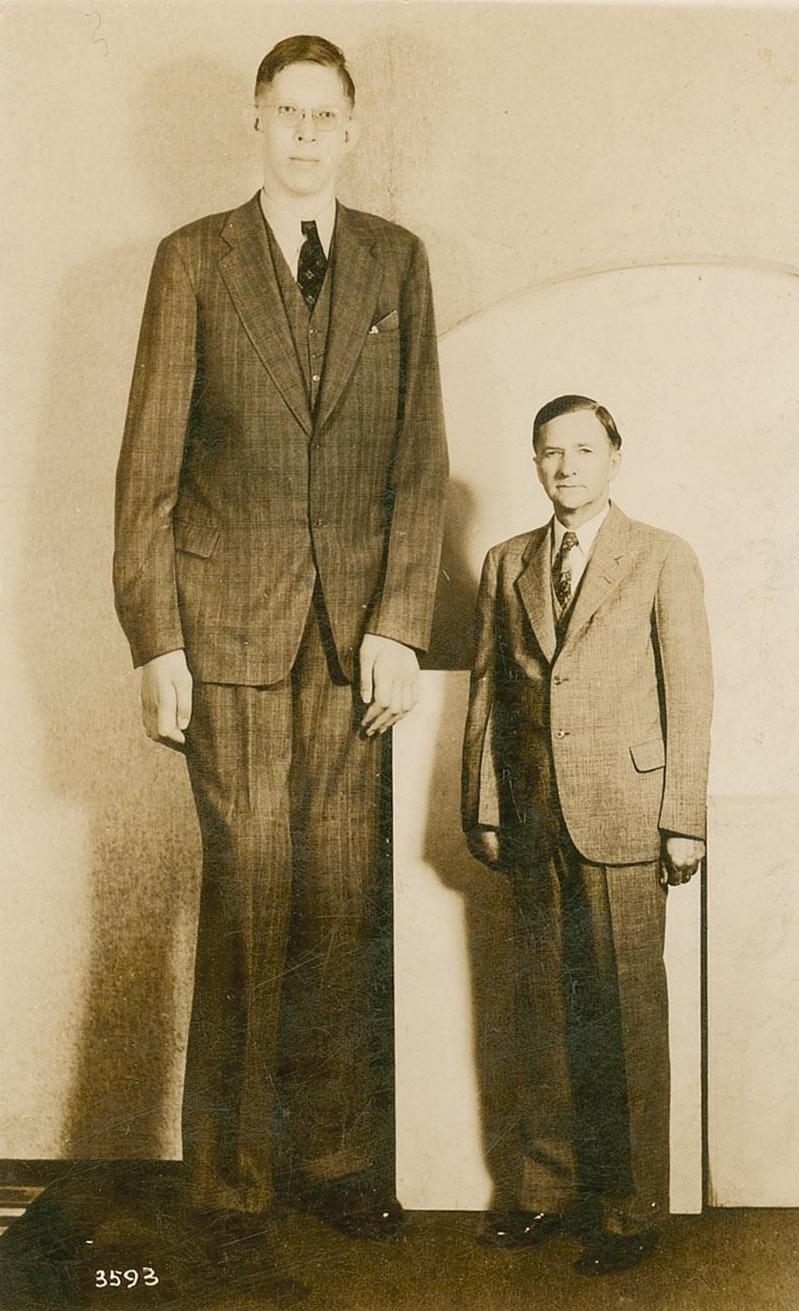
Robert Wadlow, the tallest verified human, with his 182 cm (6 ft 0 in) father

This is a list of the tallest people, verified by Guinness World Records or other reliable sources.

According to Guinness World Records, Robert Wadlow of the United States (1918–1940) was the tallest person in recorded history, measuring 272 cm (8 ft 11 in) at the time of his death.

There are reports about taller individuals but most claims are unverified or erroneous. Since antiquity, discoveries have been reported of gigantic human skeletons. Originally thought to belong to mythical giants, these bones were later identified as the exaggerated remains of prehistoric animals, usually whales or elephants. Regular reports in American newspapers in the 18th and 19th centuries of giant human skeletons may have inspired the case of the "petrified" Cardiff Giant, an archaeological hoax.

== Men (≥ 220 cm, 7 ft 3 in) ==
Living Deceased Height disputed No growth-related pathological disorder (gigantism, acromegaly)

Name	Country	Metric	Imperial	Note	Lifespan (age at death)
Robert Wadlow	United States	272 cm	8 ft 11 in	Tallest verified human in recorded history.	1918–1940 (22)
John Rogan	United States	267 cm	8 ft 9 in	Second tallest man in recorded history and tallest man of African descent. He was unable to stand due to ankylosis.	1867–1905 (38)
John F. Carroll	United States	264 cm	8 ft 8 in	8 ft 0 in (244 cm) standing height, 8 ft 7.75 in (264 cm) assuming normal spinal curvature.	1932–1969 (37)
Willie Camper	United States	262 cm	8 ft 7 in	Though billed at 8 ft 7 in (262 cm), he was reported to be 8 ft 2 in (249 cm) at the time of his death, disputing his height.	1924–1943 (18)
Siah Khan	Iran	259 cm	8 ft 6 in	Suffered from Proteus syndrome.	1913–1938 (24–25)
Akashi Shiganosuke	Japan	258 cm	8 ft 6 in	Tallest sumo wrestler and first Yokozuna in history.	1600–1649 (48–49)
Malawian Giant	Malawi	258 cm	8 ft 6 in	Not officially recognized by Guinness World Records because he refused to be measured according to their standards.	1924/25–1944 (19–20)
Hồ Văn Trung	Vietnam	257 cm	8 ft 5 in	He was reported post mortem to be 9 ft 0.25 in (275 cm), but when alive he measured at 8 ft 5.25 in (257 cm).	1984–2019 (34)
Pornchai Saosri	Thailand	257 cm	8 ft 5 in	Not recognized by Guinness World Records. Weighed 225 kg (496 lb) and claimed 8 ft 9.9 in (269 cm), but is reported to have measured 8 ft 5.2 in (257 cm) for his ID card renewal. He was unable to stand due to knee pain because of muscular dystrophy.	1989–2015 (26)
Bernard Coyne	United States	254 cm	8 ft 4 in	Coyne's World War I draft registration card, dated 29 August, gave his height as 8 ft (244 cm), although he had reached a height of 8 ft 1.7 in (2.48 m), possibly 8 feet 4 inches (254 cm) by the time of his death.	1897–1921 (23)
Édouard Beaupré	Canada	252 cm	8 ft 3 in	Circus giant for Barnum & Bailey. Possibly the tallest strongman as well as possibly the tallest wrestler in history. His death certificate stated 8 ft 3 in (2.52 m) tall and still growing, though other sources say 7 ft 8 in (234 cm). Guinness stated he was 7 ft 9 in (236 cm).	1881–1904 (23)
Parimal Barman	Bangladesh	251 cm	8 ft 3 in	Tallest person in Bangladesh ever recorded.	1962–1991 (28–29)
Väinö Myllyrinne	Finland	251 cm	8 ft 3 in	Tallest verified European. Claimed to be the tallest living person from 1940 to 1963. Measured 251.4 cm (8 ft 3 in) tall at his peak. A member of the Finnish Defence Forces, Myllyrinne is also considered the tallest soldier ever.	1909–1963 (54)
Vikas Uppal	India	251 cm	8 ft 3 in	Was not measured officially by Guinness. Tallest recorded human in Indian history.	1986–2007 (21)
Sultan Kösen	Turkey	251 cm	8 ft 3 in	The tallest living person since 17 September 2009, as determined by Guinness World Records.	born 1982
Don Koehler	United States	249 cm	8 ft 2 in	Guinness listed him as tallest living person for most of 1970s.	1925–1981 (55)
Brahim Takioullah	Morocco	246 cm	8 ft 1 in	Possesses the world's largest feet at 38 cm (1 ft 3 in).	born 1982
Morteza Mehrzad	Iran	246 cm	8 ft 1 in	Tallest man in Iran. Sitting volleyball player and three-time Paralympic champion in 2016, 2020 and 2024 Summer Paralympics.	born 1987
Dharmendra Pratap Singh	India	246 cm	8 ft 1 in	Was not officially measured by Guinness World Records. Tallest living Indian person.	born 1983
Julius Koch	German Empire	246 cm	8 ft 1 in	Probably never the world's tallest person due to his life coinciding with that of John Rogan. Skeleton preserved in the Museum of Natural History in Mons, Belgium. Tallest German person in recorded history.	1872–1902 (30)
Gabriel Estêvão Monjane	Mozambique	246 cm	8 ft 1 in	Was listed by Guinness World Records as tallest living man from 1988–1989.	1944–1990 (45)
Jean-Joseph Brice	France	245 cm	8 ft 0 in	Known as "Le Géant des Vosges", Ramonchamp, France; his exact height was controversial.	1835–?
Anton de Franckenpoint	Germany	245 cm	8 ft 0 in	Personal guard to Henry Julius, Duke of Brunswick-Lüneburg. First verified person to reach 8 feet. Nickname Langer Anton. His skeleton was later measured at 244 cm (8 ft 0 in).	1544/1561–1596 (35/52)
Suleiman Ali Nashnush	Libya	245 cm	8 ft 0 in	Libyan basketball player, who was once the tallest man according to Guinness World Records.	1943–1991 (47)
James Toller	United Kingdom	244 cm	8 ft 0 in	Tallest person recorded at the time at 8 ft 0 in (244 cm)–8 ft 1 in (246 cm). Measured officially at the age of 18. Is not recognized by the Guinness Book of World Records.	1798–1818 (20)
Zhan Shichai	China (Qing Dynasty)	244 cm	8 ft 0 in	Height disputed. Guinness World Records stated he measured 233.6 cm (7 ft 7.9 in).	1841–1893 (51)
Zia Rasheed	Pakistan	244 cm	8 ft 0 in	Was not measured by Guinness.	1993/1994–2024 (30)
Charles Sogli	Ghana	244 cm	8 ft 0 in	Has not been measured by Guinness, possibly the tallest man in Ghana.	born 1999
Patrick Cotter O'Brien	Ireland	244 cm	8 ft 0 in	Tallest person recorded at the time and the third in medical history to stand at a verified height of 8 ft 0 in (244 cm). Remains examined in 1972, measured, height verified.	1760–1806 (46)
Sa'id Muhammad Ghazi	Egypt	244 cm	8 ft 0 in	Claimed to be 9 ft 9.5 in (300 cm).	1909–1941 (31–32)
Zhang Juncai	China	242 cm	7 ft 11 in	Tallest living Chinese person.	born 1966
Suparwono	Indonesia	242 cm	7 ft 11 in	Was the tallest man in Southeast Asia, and he was also the tallest Indonesian; claimed to be 8 ft 10.5 in (270.5 cm). Officially measured (lying down and in the standing position) by the Indonesian Record Museum (MURI) in December 2009.	1985–2012 (26)
Albert Johan Kramer	Netherlands	242 cm	7 ft 11 in	Tallest man in the Netherlands. Tallest man to live past 60 years of age. His brother-in-law was a dwarf and did not exceed 69 cm (27 in). Together they formed a variety act, with performances around the world.	1897–1976 (79)
Miguel Joaquín Eleicegui	Spain	242 cm	7 ft 11 in	Tallest man recorded in Spain. The 2017 Basque movie Handia is based on his life. His remains were excavated and measured.	1818–1861 (43)
Felipe Birriel	United States (Puerto Rico)	241 cm	7 ft 11 in	Tallest Puerto Rican recorded.	1916–1994 (77)
Asadulla Khan	India	241 cm	7 ft 11 in	Second tallest man in India.	born 1988
Alexander Sizonenko	Soviet Union and Russia	240 cm	7 ft 10 in	Soviet basketball player.	1959–2012 (53)
Josef Drásal	Austria-Hungary	240 cm	7 ft 10 in	Tallest man in what is today the Czech Republic; his height is also often listed as 242 cm (7 ft 11 in).	1841–1886 (45)
Alex Gomachab	Namibia	240 cm	7 ft 10 in	Tallest man in Namibia.	born 1986
Öndör Gongor	Mongolia	240 cm	7 ft 10 in	Very tall man in early-20th-century Mongolia. Was measured by Roy Chapman Andrews.	1880/85–1925/30 (40–50)
Fyodor Makhnov	Russian Empire	239 cm	7 ft 10 in	Photographic evidence and Guinness World Records suggests 239 cm (7 ft 10 in) but claims are that he was 282 cm (9 ft 3 in) or even 285 cm (9 ft 4 in).	1878–1912 (34)
Edhem Kadušić	Bosnia and Herzegovina	238 cm	7 ft 10 in	The tallest known man in Bosnia and Herzegovina.	1917–1961 (43)
Rigardus Rijnhout	Netherlands	238 cm	7 ft 10 in	Second-tallest man in the Netherlands; he was known as the giant of Rotterdam. Early June 2011, a life-size statue of Rijnhout was unveiled in the Oude Westen district in Rotterdam.	1922–1959 (36)
Yoshimitsu Matsuzaka	Japan	237 cm	7 ft 9 in	Tallest man in Japan.	1930–1962 (32)
Abiodun Adegoke	Nigeria	236 cm	7 ft 9 in	Tallest basketball player alive. Has not been measured by Guinness, possibly the tallest living Nigerian.	born 1999
Sun Mingming	China	236 cm	7 ft 9 in	Chinese basketball player. Formerly second-tallest living person.	born 1983
Bao Xishun	China	236 cm	7 ft 9 in	Considered the tallest living person by Guinness World Records until September 2009 when he was replaced by Sultan Kösen.	born 1951
Naseer Soomro	Pakistan	236 cm	7 ft 9 in	Tallest confirmed man living in Pakistan.	1970–2025 (55)
Olivier Rioux	Canada	236 cm	7 ft 9 in	Tallest NCAA Division I basketball player in history.	born 2006
Angus MacAskill	United Kingdom	236 cm	7 ft 9 in	Tallest "true" giant (not due to a pathological condition) until Olivier Rioux matched his height.	1825–1863 (38)
Joelison Fernandes da Silva	Brazil	236 cm	7 ft 9 in	Tallest living Brazilian.	born 1985
William Bradley	United Kingdom	236 cm	7 ft 9 in	Known more commonly as Giant Bradley or the Yorkshire Giant. One of the tallest recorded British men that ever lived, measuring 7 ft 9 in (236 cm).	1787–1820 (33)
Frederick Kempster	United Kingdom	236 cm	7 ft 9 in	Height disputed between 7 ft 8.5 in (235 cm) and 8 ft 4.5 in (255 cm).	1889–1918 (29)
Martin Van Buren Bates	United States	236 cm	7 ft 9 in	Known as the Kentucky Giant or The Giant of the Hills. He and Anna Haining Bates were the tallest married couple.	1837–1919 (81)
Louis Moilanen	Finland	236 cm	7 ft 9 in	Tallest person in Michigan history and one of the tallest men in the world during his lifetime. He may have been 8 ft 1 in (246 cm) tall.	1885–1913 (28)
Walter Straub	Germany	236 cm	7 ft 9 in	Tallest man in Germany while he was alive.	1925–1986 (61)
Kaba uulu Kojomkul (Каба уулу Кожомкул)	Soviet Union	236 cm	7 ft 9 in	Kyrgyz wrestler; agriculturalist and administrator 1921–1948.	1888–1955 (67)
Uvais Akhtaev	Soviet Union	236 cm	7 ft 9 in	Soviet/Chechen basketball player in 1940–50s.	1930–1978 (48)
Radhouane Charbib	Tunisia	236 cm	7 ft 9 in	Listed by Guinness World Records as tallest man until 15 January 2005, before Bao Xishun and Sun Mingming.	born 1968
Rafael França do Nascimento	Brazil	236 cm	7 ft 9 in	Second-tallest man in Brazil.	born 1987
Rachid Bara	Algeria	235 cm	7 ft 9 in	Tallest man in Algeria while he was alive.	1974–2009 (35)
Ted Evans	United Kingdom	235 cm	7 ft 9 in	Height disputed. Claimed 9 ft 3.5 in (283 cm), while Guinness World Records stated he measured 7 ft 8.5 in (235 cm).	1924–1958 (34)
Nikolai Pankratov	Soviet Union and Russia	235 cm	7 ft 9 in	Tallest man in Russia.	born 1990
Ri Myung-hun	North Korea	235 cm	7 ft 9 in	Former basketball player with the North Korean national team.	born 1967
Cecil Boling	United States	235 cm	7 ft 9 in	Was 7 ft 8 in (234 cm) but shrank to 7 ft 0 in (213 cm) when his legs were replaced with artificial legs 8.5 in (22 cm) shorter.	1920–2000 (79)
Broc Brown	United States	235 cm	7 ft 9 in	Along with Bob Wegner, the joint-tallest living man in the United States. In 2015, he was reportedly the tallest teenager in the United States.	born 1997
Bob Wegner	United States	235 cm	7 ft 9 in	Along with Broc Brown, the joint-tallest living man in the United States. Was the tallest professional basketball player in the world until Olivier Rioux surpassed his height.	born 1993
Igor Vovkovinskiy	United States and Ukraine	234 cm	7 ft 8 in	Previously the tallest person living in the United States. Originally from Ukraine, moved to Rochester, Minnesota to be treated at the Mayo Clinic. Acted in commercials and movies. Became well known by wearing a T-shirt that read "Obama's Biggest Supporter". Took part in the Eurovision Song Contest 2013 in Malmö, Sweden, as one of the performers on the stage representing Ukraine.	1982–2021 (38)
Polipaka Gattaiah	India	234 cm	7 ft 8 in	Former tallest Indian.	1975–2015 (40)
Brenden Adams	United States	234 cm	7 ft 8 in	Former tallest teenager in the world.	1995–2025 (30)
Abdramane Dembele	Ivory Coast	234 cm	7 ft 8 in	Tallest man in Ivory Coast.	born 1985
Arshavir Grigoryan	Armenia	234 cm	7 ft 8 in	Tallest man in Armenia.	born 1990
George Bell	United States	234 cm	7 ft 8 in	Former tallest American.	1957–2025 (67)
Kaliova Seleiwau	Fiji	234 cm	7 ft 8 in	Tallest living Fijian.	born 1981
Adam Rainer	Austria-Hungary and Austria	234 cm	7 ft 8 in	Only person known to have been both a dwarf and giant. He was 118 cm (3 ft 10 in) tall at age 21 and peaked at 234 cm (7 ft 8 in) when he died, having doubled his height as an adult.	1899–1950 (51)
Alam Channa	Pakistan	234 cm	7 ft 8 in	Pakistani, considered to be the tallest living man when he died in 1998.	1953–1998 (46)
Jóhann K. Pétursson	Iceland	234 cm	7 ft 8 in	Was the tallest person in Iceland.	1913–1984 (71)
Yasutaka Okayama	Japan	234 cm	7 ft 8 in	Tallest living Japanese. Tallest basketball player drafted in NBA history.	born 1954
Daniel Cajanus	Finland	233 cm	7 ft 8 in	Claimed to be 9 ft 3 in (282 cm). Height not confirmed officially. He was only 7 ft 8 in (234 cm) according to the London Annual Register.	1703–1749 (46)
Jaime Clemente Izquierdo	Spain	233 cm	7 ft 8 in	Spain's tallest man in his lifetime.	1961–2005 (44)
Agustín Luengo Capilla	Spain	233 cm	7 ft 8 in	Circus performer. Tallest man in Spain at the time of his death.	1849–1875 (26)
Wang Feng-Jun	China	233 cm	7 ft 8 in	Asia's tallest man in 2004.	1976–2015 (39)
Neil Fingleton	United Kingdom	233 cm	7 ft 8 in	Second-tallest NCAA Division I basketball player in history. Known for his role Mag the Mighty for the HBO TV series Game of Thrones.	1980–2017 (36)
Jorge González	Argentina	232 cm	7 ft 7 in	Billed at 8 feet (244 cm), he was the tallest wrestler in WWE history. He got measured at 7 feet 7.5 inches (232 cm) in 1988; however, he is suspected to have grown afterwards.	1966–2010 (44)
Hussain Bisad	Somaliland	232 cm	7 ft 7 in	Somaliland, considered to be one of the tallest living men.	born 1975
Paul Sturgess	United Kingdom	232 cm	7 ft 7 in	Tied for the tallest player to play college basketball in the U.S.	born 1987
Kenny George	United States	231 cm	7 ft 7 in	Third-tallest NCAA Division I basketball player in history.	born 1987
Lock Martin	United States	231 cm	7 ft 7 in	He played the robot in the movie The Day the Earth Stood Still.	1916–1959 (43)
Charles Byrne	Ireland	231 cm	7 ft 7 in	Skeleton now resides in the Hunterian Museum.	1761–1783 (22)
Max Palmer	United States	231 cm	7 ft 7 in	Actor and pro wrestler. Listed by Guinness World Records at 7 ft 7 in (231 cm), claimed 8 ft 1 in (246 cm).	1927–1984 (57)
Gheorghe Mureșan	Romania	231 cm	7 ft 7 in	Tied for tallest player in National Basketball Association (NBA) history.	born 1971
Robert Bobroczkyi	Romania	231 cm	7 ft 7 in	Romanian basketball player who was 231 cm (7 ft 7 in) in 2017–18, aged 17.	born 2000
Jinnat Ali	Bangladesh	231 cm	7 ft 7 in	Claimed to be 249 cm (8 ft 2 in), but later was measured by Official Records Book of Bangladesh, at 231 cm (7 ft 7 in).	1996–2020 (24)
Jitendra Singh	India	231 cm	7 ft 7 in	Claimed being 8 feet 2 inches (249 cm), but was later measured at 7 ft 7 in (231 cm)	1971–2015 (44)
Manute Bol	South Sudan	231 cm	7 ft 7 in	Tied for tallest player in NBA history.	1962–2010 (47)
Alain Delaunois	Belgium	230 cm	7 ft 7 in	Tallest living Belgian.	born 1971
Aleksandar Rindin	Azerbaijan	230 cm	7 ft 7 in	Tallest man in Azerbaijan.	born 1985
Samuel Deguara	Italy; Malta	230 cm	7 ft 7 in	Tallest man in Italy and Malta.	born 1991
Slavko Vraneš	Montenegro	230 cm	7 ft 7 in	Tallest Montenegrin basketball player in the national basketball team, former player in the NBA	born 1983
Trần Thành Phố	Vietnam	229 cm	7 ft 6 in	Was the tallest man in Vietnam when he died in 2010.	1947–2010 (63)
Malik Sidibe	Senegal	229 cm	7 ft 6 in	Tallest basketball player in Senegal.	born 1985
Christopher Greener	United Kingdom	229 cm	7 ft 6 in	Formerly Britain's tallest man.	1943–2015 (71)
Saad Kaiche	Algeria	229 cm	7 ft 6 in	Former basketball player of Club Baloncesto Breogán of Lugo.	born 1985
Jack Earle	United States	229 cm	7 ft 6 in	Jacob Rheuben Ehrlich. American silent film actor and sideshow performer. Earle claimed to be 8 ft 6.5 in (260 cm) however his real height was 7 ft 6 in (229 cm).	1906–1952 (46)
Ralph Madsen	United States	229 cm	7 ft 6 in	Billed as 7 ft 6 in (229 cm).	1897–1948 (51)
Mills Darden	United States	229 cm	7 ft 6 in	Known for his extreme weight and height. Weighed 1,021 lb (463 kg).	1799–1857 (57)
Mike Lanier	United States	229 cm	7 ft 6 in	Former NCAA Division I basketball player and one of the world's tallest twins along with his brother Jim Lanier.	1969–2018 (48)
Jim Lanier	United States	229 cm	7 ft 6 in	One of the world's tallest twins along with his late brother Mike Lanier.	born 1969
Calvin Lane	United States	229 cm	7 ft 6 in	Actor who appeared in Walker, Texas Ranger and a few other films.	1957–2022 (65)
Yao Ming	China	229 cm	7 ft 6 in	Was the tallest player in the NBA during his playing years until his retirement in 2011.	born 1980
Shawn Bradley	United States and Germany	229 cm	7 ft 6 in	Former player in the NBA, 1993–2005, tallest living German (holding dual citizenship).	born 1972
John Hollinden	United States	229 cm	7 ft 6 in	Tallest collegiate basketball player in the history of Indiana.	1958–1992 (34)
Moussa Seck	Senegal	229 cm	7 ft 6 in	Tallest basketball player in Senegal.	born 1986
Matthew McGrory	United States	229 cm	7 ft 6 in	Was the world's tallest actor when he died in 2005.	1973–2005 (32)
Mamadou N'Diaye	Senegal	229 cm	7 ft 6 in	Was the tallest in high school and college basketball while playing in the USA (tied for tallest with Tacko Fall in his final college season in 2015–16).	born 1993
Tacko Fall	Senegal	229 cm	7 ft 6 in	Currently the tallest player in the NBA G League since being signed by the Cleveland Charge in 2022. Was the tallest high school basketball player in the US as of 2014, and was the tallest player in US college basketball from 2016 to 2019.	born 1995
Jérémy Gohier	Canada	229 cm	7 ft 6 in	Canadian youth basketball player.	born 2010
Conrad Furrows	United States	229 cm	7 ft 6 in	He was listed in the Bernard L. Kobel Catalogue of Human Oddities of Circus Sideshows.	1922–1967 (45)
Jagdeep Singh	India	229 cm	7 ft 6 in	Tallest police officer in the world.	born 1982/83
Fermín Arrudi Urieta	Spain	229 cm	7 ft 6 in	Tallest man in Spain at the time of his death.	1870–1913 (42)
Jongkuch Mach	Australia	229 cm	7 ft 6 in	Basketball player and tallest living Australian.	born 2007
Sergey Ilin	Russia	228 cm	7 ft 6 in	Tallest basketball player in Russia.	born 1988
Bienvenu Letuni	Democratic Republic of the Congo	228 cm	7 ft 6 in	Tallest basketball player in DRC.	1994–2022 (28)
Eugeniusz Taraciński	Poland	228 cm	7 ft 6 in	Tallest man in Poland while he was alive.	1928–1978 (50)
Asdrúbal Herrera Mora	Colombia	228 cm	7 ft 6 in	Tallest living Colombian.	born 1986
Martin Miklosik	Slovakia	228 cm	7 ft 6 in	Tallest basketball player in the Slovak Republic.	born 1986
Margarito Machacuay	Peru	228 cm	7 ft 6 in	The tallest Peruvian.	1965–2020 (55)
Franz Winkelmeier	Austrian Empire	228 cm	7 ft 6 in	Advertised at heights ranging from 8 feet to 8 feet 9 inches. Physician Rudolf Virchow measured him at 227.8 cm (7 ft 5.7 in) in 1885, writing about it in the German medical journal Zeitschrift für Ethnologie (Journal of Ethnology).	1860–1887 (27)
Mu Tiezhu	China	228 cm	7 ft 6 in	Tallest Basketball player in China during the 70s and 80s.	1949–2008 (59)
Jeison Rodríguez	Venezuela	227 cm	7 ft 5 in	Tallest man in Venezuela. Also holds the Guinness Record of largest feet.	c. born 1995
Chuck Nevitt	United States	226 cm	7 ft 5 in	Former player in the NBA, 1983, 1984–1989, 1991, 1993.	born 1959
Trent Burns	United States	226 cm	7 ft 5 in	Basketball player for Missouri Tigers. Second tallest NCAA player behind Olivier Rioux.	born 2005
Pavel Podkolzin	Russia	226 cm	7 ft 5 in	Tallest association football player ever. Also a former player in the NBA, playing for the Dallas Mavericks from 2004–2006 making him the tallest Russian NBA player ever.	born 1985
Sim Bhullar	Canada	226 cm	7 ft 5 in	Former player in the NBA, he played for the Sacramento Kings in 2014–2015 making him the tallest Canadian NBA player ever.	born 1992
Gabe Dynes	United States	226 cm	7 ft 5 in	NCAA Division I basketball player currently playing for the Louisville Cardinals. Previously played for the Youngstown State Penguins and the USC Trojans.	born 2004
Will Jacobsen	United States	226 cm	7 ft 5 in	Professional basketball player who played most of his career with the surname Foster.	born 1988
Jamarion Sharp	United States	226 cm	7 ft 5 in	Tallest college basketball player from 2021–2024.	born 2001
Marko Dujković	North Macedonia	226 cm	7 ft 5 in	Tallest basketball player in North Macedonia.	born 1990
Tomáš Pustina	Czech Republic	226 cm	7 ft 5 in	Tallest man in Czechia at the time of his death.	1977–2016 (38)
Henrik Brustad	Norway	226 cm	7 ft 5 in	Was known as worlds largest and strongest man in Norway.	1844–1899 (54)
Nagawoo Jimaan	Ethiopia	225 cm	7 ft 5 in	Tallest living man in Ethiopia.	born 1997/98
Ivo Höger	Czech Republic	225 cm	7 ft 5 in	Tallest living man in the Czech Republic. Former professional basketball player.	born 1982
Jannik Könecke	Germany	225 cm	7 ft 5 in	Tallest living man in Germany.	born 2000
Jerry Sokoloski	Canada	225 cm	7 ft 5 in	Canadian actor and basketball player. Former tallest living man in Canada.	born 1983
John Aasen	United States	225 cm	7 ft 5 in	Was promoted to be 8 ft 2 in (249 cm), his skeleton was measuring 7 ft 3 in (221 cm), but he lost some inches due to his age.	1890–1938 (48)
Xu Xin	China	225 cm	7 ft 5 in	Tallest basketball player in China’s CBA.	Born in 2003
Afeez Agoro Oladimeji	Nigeria	225 cm	7 ft 5 in	Tallest man in Nigeria while he was alive.	1975–2023 (47)
Mark Eaton	United States	224 cm	7 ft 4 in	Former player in the NBA, he played for the Utah Jazz from 1982–1993. Was one of the tallest left-handed people.	1957–2021 (64)
Gogea Mitu	Romania	224 cm	7 ft 4 in	Tallest boxer ever recorded in history.	1909–1936 (26)
Jonas Paukštė	Lithuania	224 cm	7 ft 4 in	Tallest Lithuanian basketball player of all time.	born 2000
Rik Smits	Netherlands	224 cm	7 ft 4 in	Former player in the NBA, he played for the Indiana Pacers from 1988–2000 making him the tallest Dutch NBA player ever.	born 1966
Priest Lauderdale	Bulgaria and United States	224 cm	7 ft 4 in	Former player in the NBA, 1996–1998. Tallest living left-handed man.	born 1973
Christ Koumadje	Chad	224 cm	7 ft 4 in	Chadian professional basketball player.	born 1996
Boban Marjanović	Serbia	224 cm	7 ft 4 in	Was tied as the tallest active NBA player in 2024.	born 1988
Daniel Gilchrist	United States	224 cm	7 ft 4 in	Actor known for his role as Demby in Chained for Life (2019 film).	born 1982
Michael Fusek	Slovakia	224 cm	7 ft 4 in	Slovak professional basketball player.	born 1995
Tyrone Harris	United States	224 cm	7 ft 4 in	Rapper known as Sevenfoot Rapper	born 1981
Shaun Aisbitt	Ireland	224 cm	7 ft 4 in	Declared Ireland's tallest man in 1985 at the age of 21.	born 1962
Victor Wembanyama	France	224 cm	7 ft 4 in	French basketball player and the tallest active NBA player. Drafted first overall in the 2023 NBA draft. Currently plays for the San Antonio Spurs. He is the tallest living man in France.	born 2004
Konstantin Klein	Germany	223 cm	7 ft 4 in	Tallest man in Germany at the time of his death.	1957–2009 (51)
Michael Hayn	Germany	223 cm	7 ft 4 in	In 2019, he was unofficially considered the tallest living German.	born 1973
Sulemana Abdul-Samed	Ghana	223 cm	7 ft 4 in	Tallest confirmed man in Ghana.	1994–2026 (32)
Robert Zwaan	Netherlands	223 cm	7 ft 4 in	Tallest living man in the Netherlands. Measured either 223.2cm or 223.3cm in 1992 according to different newspapers.	born 1968
Brandon Marshall	U.K.	223 cm	7 ft 4 in	Former World's Tallest Teenager in 2018.	born 2002
Jaber Rouzbahani	Iran	223 cm	7 ft 4 in	Iranian former professional basketball player.	born 1986
Ujang Warlika	Indonesia	223 cm	7 ft 4 in	Tallest Indonesian basketball player.	Unknown
Kewal Shiels	Australia	223 cm	7 ft 4 in	Former basketball player. Former tallest living man in Australia.	born 1989
Rolf Mayr	Germany	222 cm	7 ft 3 in	Former professional basketball player. Surpassed by Jannik Könecke as the tallest living man in Germany.	born 1964
Peter John Ramos	Puerto Rico	222 cm	7 ft 3 in	Former player in the NBA, he played for the Washington Wizards from 2004–2005. Height disputed between 7’3.5” or 7’4”	born 1985
Ring Ayuel	South Sudan	222 cm	7 ft 3 in	Height disputed between sources, either 7 ft 3.5 in (222 cm), or 7 ft 4 in (224 cm).	born 1988
Patrick Murphy	United Kingdom	222 cm	7 ft 3 in	Reported to be anywhere from 7 ft 7.5 in (232 cm) to 8 ft 10 in (269 cm), but later measured at 7 ft 3.4 in (222.0 cm).	1834–1862 (27)
Mounir Fourar	Algeria	222 cm	7 ft 3 in	Was not officially measured by Guinness.	1972–2012 (40)
Nedžad Sinanović	Bosnia and Herzegovina	222 cm	7 ft 3 in	Bosnian former professional basketball player.	born 1983
Gino Cuccarolo	Italy	222 cm	7 ft 3 in	Tallest man in Italy.	born 1987
Liu Chuanxing	China	222 cm	7 ft 3 in	Chinese professional basketball player.	born 1997
Janar Purason	Estonia	222 cm	7 ft 3 in	Tallest man in Estonia.	born 1985
Vincent Pourchot	France	222 cm	7 ft 3 in	Professional basketball player. Surpassed by Victor Wembanyama as the tallest living man in France.	born 1992
Ren Keyu	China	221 cm	7 ft 3 in	Guinness World Records records him as tallest living male teenager in the world.	born 2006
Matt Haarms	Netherlands	221 cm	7 ft 3 in	Dutch professional basketball player.	born 1997
Jason Bennett	United States	221 cm	7 ft 3 in	American former NCAA Division I and professional basketball player.	born 1986
Rajan Adhikari	Nepal	221 cm	7 ft 3 in	Tallest man from Nepal.	born 1978
Andrey Desyatnikov	Russia	221 cm	7 ft 3 in	Russian professional basketball player.	born 1994
Rob Bruintjes	Netherlands	221 cm	7 ft 3 in	Former tallest living man in the Netherlands. Met Robert Zwaan in 1992 and was found to be just under an inch shorter than him when they were measured together.	born 1951
Jermaine Middleton	United States	221 cm	7 ft 3 in	American former professional basketball player who played for the Harlem Globetrotters.	born 1984
Duşan Cantekin	Serbia and Turkey	221 cm	7 ft 3 in	Serbian-born Turkish professional basketball player.	born 1990
Luigi Suigo	Italy	221 cm	7 ft 3 in	Tallest active Italian basketball player.	born 2007
Felipe dos Anjos	Brazil	221 cm	7 ft 3 in	Brazilian professional basketball player.	born 1998
Aday Mara	Spain	221 cm	7 ft 3 in	Spanish NCAA Division I basketball player.	born 2005
Shagari Alleyne	United States	221 cm	7 ft 3 in	American former professional basketball player.	born 1984
Gunther Behnke	Germany	221 cm	7 ft 3 in	German former professional basketball player.	born 1963
Randy Breuer	United States	221 cm	7 ft 3 in	Former player in the NBA, 1983–1994.	born 1960
Žydrūnas Ilgauskas	Lithuania	221 cm	7 ft 3 in	Former player in the NBA, 1996–2011.	born 1975
Arvydas Sabonis	Lithuania	221 cm	7 ft 3 in	Former player in the NBA, he played for the Portland Trail Blazers from 1995–2001 and in the 2002–2003 season.	born 1964
Hasheem Thabeet	Tanzania	221 cm	7 ft 3 in	Former player in the NBA, 2009–2014. He is the only Tanzanian player to play in the NBA. Currently plays for Pazi in the Tanzania Basketball League.	born 1987
Jakob Nacken	Germany	221 cm	7 ft 3 in	German circus performer and German Army (1935–1945) soldier during World War II.	1906–1987 (81)
Youssoupha Fall	Senegal	221 cm	7 ft 3 in	Senegalese professional basketball player.	born 1995
Zhang Zhaoxu	China	221 cm	7 ft 3 in	Chinese professional basketball player.	born 1987
Sam Harris	Australia	221 cm	7 ft 3 in	Australian former professional basketball player.	born 1984
Nemanja Bešović	Serbia	221 cm	7 ft 3 in	Serbian professional basketball player.	born 1992
Constantin Popa	Romania and Israel	221 cm	7 ft 3 in	Romanian-Israeli former professional basketball player.	born 1971
Keith Closs	United States	221 cm	7 ft 3 in	Former player in the NBA, he played for the Los Angeles Clippers from 1997–2000.	born 1976
Swede Halbrook	United States	221 cm	7 ft 3 in	Former player in the NBA, he played for the Syracuse Nationals from 1961–1962.	1933–1988 (55)
Ha Seung-jin	South Korea	221 cm	7 ft 3 in	Former player in the NBA, he played for the Portland Trail Blazers from 2005–2006. He is the only South Korean player to play in the NBA.	born 1985
Aleksandar Radojević	Bosnia and Herzegovina and Montenegro	221 cm	7 ft 3 in	Former player in the NBA, 1999–2000, 2004–2005.	born 1976
Walter Tavares	Cape Verde	221 cm	7 ft 3 in	Former player in the NBA, 2015–2016, 2017. He is the only Cape Verdean player to play in the NBA. Currently plays for Real Madrid in the Liga ACB.	born 1992
Tibor Pleiß	Germany	221 cm	7 ft 3 in	Former player in the NBA, he played for the Utah Jazz from 2015–2016. Currently plays for Anadolu Efes S.K. in the Turkish Super League.	born 1989
Jim Tarver	United States	221 cm	7 ft 3 in	Billed at 8 ft 4 in (254 cm). Experts suggest he was closer to 7 ft 3 in (221 cm).	1885–1958 (72)
Vladimir Tkachenko	Ukraine and Russia	221 cm	7 ft 3 in	Retired Soviet basketball player who was 7 ft 3 in (221 cm) tall.	born 1957
Roberto Dueñas	Spain	221 cm	7 ft 3 in	Spanish former professional basketball player.	born 1975
Mark Jackson	United States	221 cm	7 ft 3 in	Former college basketball player for Penn Quakers.	born 1997
Peter Mayhew	United Kingdom	221 cm	7 ft 3 in	Chewbacca actor in the Star Wars franchise.	1944–2019 (74)
Jordan Omogbehin	Nigeria	221 cm	7 ft 3 in	Nigerian professional wrestler and former NCAA Division I basketball player.	born 1992
Zach Edey	Canada	221 cm	7 ft 3 in	Canadian basketball player and the second tallest active NBA player since being drafted in the 2024 NBA draft. Currently plays for the Memphis Grizzlies.	born 2002
Rocco Zikarsky	Australia	221 cm	7 ft 3 in	Australian basketball player and along with Zach Edey the second tallest active NBA player since being drafted in the 2025 NBA draft. Currently plays for the Minnesota Timberwolves.	born 2006
Kristaps Porziņģis	Latvia	220 cm	7 ft 3 in	Used to be the third tallest active NBA player. Currently plays for the Golden State Warriors.	born 1995
Jānis Krūmiņš	Latvia	220 cm	7 ft 3 in	Latvian former professional basketball player.	1930–1994 (64)
Kai Sotto	Philippines	220 cm	7 ft 3 in	Philippine basketball player.	born 2002
Sam Koban	United States	220 cm	7 ft 3 in	Social media personality.	born 2001
Jordan Wilmore	United States	220 cm	7 ft 3 in	Basketball player and tallest known police officer in the United States.	born 2001

== Women (≥ 210 cm, 6 ft 11 in) ==
Living Deceased Height disputed No growth-related pathological disorder (gigantism, acromegaly)

Name	Country	Metric	Imperial	Note	Lifespan (age at death)
Trijntje Keever	Netherlands	260 cm	8 ft 6 in	Alleged tallest woman in recorded history (not recognized by Guinness World Records).	1616–1633 (17)
Ella Ewing	United States	254 cm	8 ft 4 in	Alleged second tallest woman in recorded history (not recognized by Guinness World Records). Her mother describes her full height at 8 ft 4 in (2.54 m).	1872–1913 (40)
Zeng Jinlian	China	246 cm	8 ft 1 in	Confirmed by Guinness World Records as tallest female recorded. Suffered from spine curvature and could not stand at full height. Tallest recorded Chinese person and world's tallest person shortly before her death. She is the only female verified to have reached 8 feet (244 cm) tall.	1964–1982 (17)
Anna Haining Bates	Canada	241 cm	7 ft 11 in	She and Martin Van Buren Bates were the tallest married couple.	1846–1888 (41)
Jane Bunford	United Kingdom	241 cm	7 ft 11 in	Tallest recorded English woman and possibly the world's tallest person at the time of her death. Given height is adjusted for spinal curvature; maximum standing height was 7 ft 10 in (239 cm).	1895–1922 (27)
Siddiqa Parveen	India	234 cm	7 ft 8 in	Listed as tallest living woman by Guinness World Records in 2014. Also tallest recorded Indian woman.	1987/88–2024 (36)
Yao Defen	China	233 cm	7 ft 8 in	Listed as tallest living female by Guinness World Records until her death on 13 November 2012.	1972–2012 (40)
Mulia	Indonesia	233 cm	7 ft 8 in	Tallest woman in Indonesia.	1956–1991 (35)
Sandy Allen	United States	232 cm	7 ft 7 in	Listed as tallest living female by Guinness World Records, and the tallest American woman, until her death on 13 August 2008.	1955–2008 (53)
Katia D'Avilla Rodrigues	Brazil	230 cm	7 ft 7 in	Height not confirmed officially. Experts suggest she was closer to 7 ft 6.6 in (230 cm) from photographic evidence.	1963–2011 (48)
Vasiliki Caliandi	Greece	230 cm	7 ft 7 in	Along with Maria Stylianopoulou, the joint-tallest woman in Greece.	1882–1904 (22)
Maria Stylianopoulou	Greece	230 cm	7 ft 7 in	Along with Vasiliki Caliandi, the joint-tallest woman in Greece.	1947–1998 (50)
Sun Fang	China	221 cm	7 ft 3 in	Asserted to be the world's tallest living woman in 2016. Height never confirmed by Guinness World Records. No up-to-date information available.	born 1987
Zhang Ziyu	China	220 cm	7 ft 3 in	Tallest women's basketball player.	born 2007
Margo Dydek	Poland	218 cm	7 ft 2 in	Tallest player in WNBA history.	1974–2011 (37)
Zainab Bibi	Pakistan	218 cm	7 ft 2 in	Asserted to be the world's tallest woman in 2003.	1972–2018 (46)
Maria Fassnauer	Italy	217 cm	7 ft 1 in	She was known as the Tyrolean giantess.	1879–1917 (38)
Stephanie Okechukwu	Nigeria	216 cm	7 ft 1 in	Tallest women's college basketball player in the United States.	born 2005
Ance Baura	Latvia	216 cm	7 ft 1 in	Diplomat for her country's permanent mission. Lives with Marfan syndrome.	born 1991
Rumeysa Gelgi	Turkey	215 cm	7 ft 1 in	Tallest living woman officially confirmed by Guinness World Records since 2021, and previously world's tallest female teenager.	born 1997
Malee Duangdee	Thailand	214 cm	7 ft 0 in	Formerly the world's tallest female teenager recognized by Guinness World Records.	1991–2016 (24)
Poonam Chaturvedi	India	213 cm	7 ft 0 in	Tallest Indian women's basketball player.	born 1995
Uljana Semjonova	Latvia	213 cm	7 ft 0 in	She was a 213-cm tall center and notable basketball player in the history of the game.	1952–2026 (73)
Jaana Kotova	Estonia	211 cm	6 ft 11 in	Tallest woman in Estonia.	born 1974
Miranda Weber	Canada	211 cm	6 ft 11 in	Tallest female volleyball player.	born 2000
Kristina Larsdotter	Sweden	210 cm	6 ft 11 in	Better known as Stor-Stina (Big Stina), she was a Sami woman with gigantism, who was examined by Swedish anatomists and later toured internationally under the stage name The Lapland Giantess.	1819–1854 (35)
Marvadene Anderson	Jamaica	210 cm	6 ft 11 in	Recognized as previously the world's tallest teenage girl and was also the tallest women's college basketball player in the U.S.	born 1993
Han Xu	China	210 cm	6 ft 11 in	Tallest Asian WNBA player.	born 1999

== Disputed and unverified claims ==
Found to be non-human Likely mythical or legendary

Name	Country	Metric	Imperial	Note	Epoch or lifespan (age at death)
Unknown	Italy	1005 cm	33 ft 0 in	Several skeletons, some reportedly 30 and 33 ft (9.1 and 10.1 m) tall, found in Sicily. In the Middle Ages, they were mistaken for the bones of cyclops or giants who settled in caves after the Flood. Later studies have shown that these bones belong to Elephas (Palaeoloxodon) antiquus, Elephas mnaidriensis, and Elephas falconeri, so-called dwarf elephants from the Middle and Late Pleistocene.	Middle to Late Pleistocene. Originally thought to be from the Classical Antiquity.
Unknown	India	960 cm	31 ft 6 in	A skeleton 31.5 ft (9.6 m) long, found in the river bank in the Jabalpur district on August 8, 1934. Australian news outlets fabricated a story that it was initially believed to be a giant human, then was identified as a giant non-human ape soon after unearthing.	Unknown
Teutobochus (Theutobochus)	France	760 cm	24 ft 11 in	A left part of a huge skeleton was discovered in a sand quarry in Dauphiné in 1613. These bones were thought to belong to an ancient giant king 24–25 ft (7.3–7.6 m) tall. Later studies have shown that it is a Late Miocene proboscidean Deinotherium or close relative. The existence of a large tombstone from early reports has not been confirmed, the coins found along with the bones belong to Marseille Republic and were found a few years before the discovery of the skeleton.	Late Miocene. Originally thought to be from 105 BC.
Unknown	United States	610 cm	20 ft 0 in	A giant human skeleton from Tennessee, found in 1845. It was estimated at 18 ft (5.5 m) but the living man was believed to be "at least" 20 ft (6.1 m) tall. However, even in 1845 it was reported that the discovery was not confirmed. This skeleton as well as an 8 ft 9 in (2.67 m) tall specimen found in the Rocky Mountains in 1838, is very likely the remains of an extinct animal.	Unknown
Giant of Utica	Tunisia	590 cm	19 ft 4 in	A gigantic remains including teeth discovered near Utica by Saint Augustine in 412 AD and later by Thomas d'Arcos in 1630. The bones crumbled to dust during the extraction, but two enormous teeth were saved. It was assumed that this skeleton and similar specimens from the nearby localities are the remains of the giants, Hercules or Adam. However, already in 1631, Peiresc suggested that these remains belong to a marine animal or an elephant. More recent research indicates that this giant's preserved upper molar is most likely belongs to a Pleistocene relative of the modern African elephant.	Pleistocene. Originally thought to be a 600-year-old giant who died 4000 years before his remains were found.
Unknown	Switzerland	580 cm	19 ft 0 in	A giant skeleton found near Lucerne in 1577. In 1786, Johann Friedrich Blumenbach concluded that these remains actually belong to a mammoth.	Pleistocene. Originally thought to be from the antediluvian times.
Patagon	Argentina	450 cm	14 ft 9 in	From the time of Magellan's expeditions until the end of the 18th century, European explorers reported about the Patagonians 2.7 and 3.0 m (9 and 10 ft) tall, and even an individual about 4 or 4.5 m (13 or 15 ft) tall captured by Magellan's crewmen near the Santa Cruz River (Argentina). In reality, Patagonians usually did not exceed 1.8 m (6 ft) in height. A 1615 report about a grave with bones of the giants in Puerto Deseado could have been initiated by fossil finds.	c. 1520
Og	Syria (Bashan)	412 cm	13 ft 6 in	As it is claimed in the Bible, Og's sarcophagus (bed or probably couch) was nine cubits long and four cubits wide which is approximately 4.1 m × 1.8 m (13.5 ft × 6 ft). Historicity of Og is disputed, his sarcophagus could be a dolmen. In Europe, such tombs have been called "beds of the giants".	Unknown – Iron Age
Irish giant	Ireland	371 cm	12 ft 2 in	Also known as The Giant of Antrim or the Irish Giant, this alleged creature was said to have been excavated by a Mr Dyer while he was prospecting for iron ore in County Antrim, Ireland.	Unknown
Unknown	United States	366 cm	12 ft 0 in	A human skeleton 12 ft 0 in (3.66 m) tall with ribs nearly 4 ft (1.2 m) long found near Barnard, Missouri, on September 13, 1883. Unverified.	Claims of being from the prehistoric times.
Siah Khan Ibn Kashmir Khan	Iran	364 cm	11 ft 11 in	It was claimed that at the age of 18 Kashmir Khan was almost 12 feet (365.8 cm) tall but when he was admitted to hospital in 1933 he was found to be only 7 ft 2.6 in (220 cm) tall.	1913–1938 (aged 24–25)
Giant of Castelnau	France	350 cm	11 ft 6 in	Height estimate based on bone fragments found at the Neolithic cemetery of Castelnau-le-Lez, excavated in 1890 by Georges Vacher de Lapouge and published in the journal La Nature, Vol. 18, 1890.	Unknown – Neolithic
Unknown	United States	343 cm	11 ft 3 in	As quoted in The New York Times in 1880, two giant skeletons, both at 11 ft 3 in (3.43 m), were found in Pennsylvania in 1798. After being taken up, the bones crumbled to pieces.	Unknown
Unknown	United States	328 cm	10 ft 9 in	A skeleton with teeth and jaws nearly as large as those of a horse, found in 1856 in the vineyard of East Wheeling, Virginia. Unverified.	Unknown
Jose Punlos	Andorra	320 cm	10 ft 6 in	Height not confirmed officially.	Unknown
Eleazer	Iran	320 cm	10 ft 6 in	According to Josephus, Eleazer was a 7 cubit (10.5 foot) Jewish man, sent to Tiberius by Artabanus II.	Classical era
Zhan Shichai	Qing China	320 cm	10 ft 6 in	Claims of being 10 ft 6 in (320 cm). Guinness stated he measured 7 ft 8.75 in (233.5 cm). Height not confirmed officially.	1841–1893 (52)
Sam McDonald	Scotland	315 cm	10 ft 4 in	Sam McDonald (1762 – 6 May 1802), called "Big Sam", was a Scotsman of unusual height for his day who had a distinguished military career and was a noted "strongman". Most sources state his height as 6 feet 10 inches (2.08 m), with a burly build, although one 1822 source claims 10 feet 4 inches (3.15 m).	1762–1802 (40?)
Orestes	Greece	312 cm	10 ft 3 in	According to Herodotus, a coffin 7 cubits (311.5 cm if 1 cubit is 44.5 cm) long with the skeleton of exactly the same size was found in Tegea. In fact, bones of Orestes could have belonged to a large Pleistocene animal.	Pleistocene. Originally thought to be from the Classical antiquity
Abou El Sayed	Egypt	310 cm	10 ft 2 in	Lived in Desouk and worked there as a waiter until he became too tall and could not continue to serve customers. It is stated that he was 10 feet 2 inches (310 cm) tall and was still growing at the age of 14.	1924–? (aged 14 in March 1938)
Emperor Keikō	Japan	310 cm	10 ft 2 in	Claims of being 10 feet 2 inches (310 cm); not confirmed.	13 BC – 130 AD (143)
Unknown	United States	305 cm	10 ft 0 in	Multiple human skeletons discovered by Dr. J. F. Everhart and the Historical Society of Brushcreek Township, Ohio, in 1880. Unverified, controversial, and disputed.	Unknown
Cardiff Giant	United States	305 cm	10 ft in	The Cardiff Giant was one of the most famous archaeological hoaxes in American history. It was a 10-foot-tall (3.0 m), roughly 3,000 pound purported "petrified man", uncovered on October 16, 1869, by workers digging a well behind the barn of William C.	Unknown
Emperor Chūai	Japan	303 cm	9 ft 11 in	He was handsome and 1 length (303 cm) tall . According to the "Nihon Shoki", his uncle Emperor Wakatarihiko (Emperor Seimu) had no heir, so he became the crown prince at the age of 31 on March 1, 48th year of Emperor Seimu's reign.	149–200 (aged 50–51)
Ruan Wengzhong	China	300 cm	9 ft 10 in	Ruan Wengzhong was a historical person during the Qin dynasty, who was recorded to have fought against the Xiongnu on the Great Wall at the border city of Lintao. He was allegedly a 3 meters tall giant. His story was first mentioned by the 3rd century CE writer Gao You in his commentary of the Huainanzi, and later developed in the 6th century Commentary on the Water Classic:	fl. 3rd century
Goliath	Land of Israel	297 cm	9 ft 9 in	Champion soldier of the Philistine army from Gath. Recorded by the prophet Samuel as being 6 cubits 1 span tall in 1st Samuel 17:4.	c. 1000 BC
Guzkan	Turkey	295 cm	9 ft 8 in	In 1961, a Turkish peasant named Guzkan was reportedly observed with a height of 295 cm (9 ft 8 in). He was said to move very quickly, taking strides of about 2 m (6 ft 7 in), and was reportedly capable of covering a distance of about 10 km (6.2 mi) in one hour. However, this information has not been officially confirmed.	fl. 1961
Gabara	Arabia	290 cm	9 ft 6 in	Mentioned by Pliny the Elder as living in his own time. Also mentioned as Gabbara (probably from Arabic جَبَّار jabbār, "mighty, powerful") by Robert Plot in his Natural history of Oxfordshire, 1677.	fl. 1st century
John Hale	United Kingdom	290 cm	9 ft 6 in	Was supposedly the tallest living man in 1892 at a staggering 9 ft 6 in (290 cm). Height not confirmed officially.	fl. ? – December 1892
Chang Jiao-Tai	China	288 cm	9 ft 5 in	Said to have been a person from Guangxi. He is believed to have lived sometime between the 17th and 19th centuries. However, this information has not been officially confirmed.	fl. 17th and 19th century
Kazanloff	Russian Empire	282 cm	9 ft 3 in	Height not confirmed officially.	1888–?
John Middleton (The Childe Of Hale)	England	282 cm	9 ft 3 in	Claimed being 9 ft 3 (282 cm). Guinness stated he was actually about 7 ft 8 (234 cm) from modern evidence.	1578–1623 (45)
Assen Ivanov Giorgiev	Bulgaria	280 cm	9 ft 2 in	Assen Ivanov Giorgiev (Bulgaria) was supposedly 9 ft 2 in (279 cm) tall. 2 feet less would be more accurate.	Unknown
George Kennedy	United States	275 cm	9 ft 0 in	Height not confirmed officially. More likely 7 ft 2 in (218 cm).	?-? (39)
Hồ Văn Trung	Vietnam	275 cm	9 ft 0 in	After he died he was reported post mortem to be 9 ft 0.25 in (275 cm), but when alive he claimed 8 ft 5.25 in (257 cm).	1984–2019 (34)
Almiro Crema	Italy	274 cm	9 ft 0 in	Height not confirmed officially.	1900–?
Ann Dunn	Great Britain	274 cm	9 ft 0 in	At her death she was reported to be approximately 9 feet tall, and 500 pounds. Height not confirmed officially.	?-1884 (39)
Colonel Pickett Nelson	United States	274 cm	9 ft 0 in	Height not confirmed officially. Was also claimed to be over 7 feet tall in 1887.	1861–1892
Unknown	United States	274 cm	9 ft 0 in	Reported on August 29, 1883, as a skeleton of at least 9 ft 0 in (2.74 m) high but found to be only at 5 ft 8 in (1.73 m) after measurements.	Unknown
Priests of Apollo	Hyperborea (by North of Greece)	274 cm	9 ft 0 in	According to Claudius Aelianus, three sons of Boreas, each 6 cubits (2.7 m (9 ft) if 1 cubit is 45 cm) tall, were priests of Apollo. Hyperborea itself is a legendary country and the subject of symbolic interpretations.	c. 2nd century AD
John Aasen	United States	274 cm	9 ft 0 in	American silent movie actor, height is not confirmed officially. His skeleton was measured at 7 feet 2.4 inches (219 cm).	1890–1938 (48)
Unknown	Mexico	272 cm	8 ft 11 in	Charles C. Clapp, who managed the mining interests of Thomas W. Lawson in Mexico, reported discovering a cave containing about 200 human skeletons, each said to exceed 8 ft (2.4 m) in height. The cave was believed to be the burial place of a race of giants predating the Aztecs. Clapp measured one skeleton at 8 ft 11 in (2.72 m); its femur reached his thigh, the molars were said to be large enough to crack a coconut, and the skull measured about 18 in (46 cm) in length.	Claims of being from the before the 14th century.
Unknown	Indonesia	269 cm	8 ft 10 in	Height not confirmed officially.	Unknown
Pornchai Saosri	Thailand	269 cm	8 ft 10 in	Was not measured officially by Guinness.	1989–2015 (26)
Klaas van Kitten	Netherlands	269 cm	8 ft 10 in	Klaas van Kitten was considered the tallest man in the 13th century, when he lived in Spaarnewoude, the Netherlands. Not much is known about his life.	?–1319
Eddie Carmel	Israel	267 cm	8 ft 9 in	Unconfirmed height; claimed to be 9 ft 0.6 in (275 cm), billed at 8 ft 9.1 in (267 cm).	1936–1972 (36)
Zhang Yingwu	China	265 cm	8 ft 8 in	Height not confirmed officially.	1921–1984 (63)
Akashi Shiganosuke	Tokugawa shogunate	264 cm	8 ft 8 in	Was born in 1600 and is not recognised by the Guinness World Records and he is also believed to be 245 cm (8 ft 0.5 in).	1600–1649 (48–49)
Bernardo Gigli (Gilli)	Prince-Bishopric of Trent	260 cm	8 ft 6 in	Italian giant. He was claimed to be 244 cm (8 ft 0 in) or even 260 cm (8 ft 6 in) but his actual height was 229.8 cm (7 ft 6.5 in).	1726–1774/91 (48–65)
Ben Wilhite	United States	259 cm	8 ft 6 in	Was reported to be the tallest man who ever lived in Tennessee.	?–1894
Leonid Stadnyk	Soviet Union and Ukraine	258 cm	8 ft 6 in	Refused to be measured by Guinness according to their new guidelines. Photographic evidence suggests that he was not taller than 7 ft 7 in (231 cm).	1970—2014 (44)
Maruthi Hanamanth Koli	India	257 cm	8 ft 5 in	Height not confirmed officially.	born 1981
Ivan Stepanovich Loushkin	Russian Empire	257 cm	8 ft 5 in	Claims of being 8 feet 5 inches (257 cm), height not confirmed officially.	1811–1844 (33)
J. G. Tarver	United States	256 cm	8 ft 5 in	Alba, Texas, a member of the Scottish Rite class of 1925, was reported to be 8 ft 5 in (256 cm) tall and to have weighed 460 Ib (210 kg).	1885-1958 (72)
Al Tomaini	United States	255 cm	8 ft 4 in	Height disputed. Claimed to be 8 ft 4 in (254 cm). Guinness stated he was 7 ft 4 in (224 cm). Tomaini was the son of Santo Tomaini and Maria Bossone. At the age of 12, he was taller than his father, who stood 6 ft 3 in tall. He had a great-grandfather in Italy who was also of abnormal height. His parents consulted a physician who, with X-rays, discovered the cause of his gigantism to be an over-active pituitary gland.	1912–1962 (50)
Ajaz Ahmed	Pakistan	254 cm	8 ft 4 in	Height not confirmed officially.	born 1976
Emmett Roberts	United States	254 cm	8 ft 4 in	He was probably born around 1890 and died at 19 from Elephantitus. At 15 he was of normal size and attained his remarkable proportions during the next four years.	born around 1890 (19)
Charles Price	Madagascar	254 cm	8 ft 4 in	was born around 1835 and was said to be both a giant and an albino.	born around 1835
Kurz Zech	Germany	253 cm	8 ft 4 in	He is the tallest German giant in the history of professional wrestling.	fl. 1940
Johann Hartmann Reichart	Germany	251 cm	8 ft 3 in	According to old newspaper articles, both of his parents were giants.	？
Parimal Barman	Bangladesh	251 cm	8 ft 3 in	Claims of being 8 feet 3 inches (251 cm); not confirmed.	1962–1991 (29)
Annie Irwin	United States	251 cm	8 ft 3 in	Born in Chicago. Claimed to be 8 feet 3 inches (251 cm); not confirmed.	c. 1919
MacQuail	Scotland	251 cm	8 ft 3 in	His skeleton measured only 7 ft 2.6 in.	?
Donald McGregor	Scotland	250 cm	8 ft 2 in	Donald McGregor was touring with the Foley and Burk shows in 1916. He was billed at 8 feet 2.5 inches (250 cm). in height and the best proportioned and tallest man born in the last 200 years.	1874–?
Ring Kuot	South Sudan	250 cm	8 ft 2 in	Was not measured by Guinness. Tallest recorded Sudanese person.	1986–2007 (21)
Henry Alexander Cooper	United Kingdom	249 cm	8 ft 2 in	Height not confirmed officially.	1853–1899 (46)
Karan Singh	India	249 cm	8 ft 2 in	Claimed to be 7 ft 11 (242 cm), aged 13. Son of Indian basketball player Shweatlana Singh. Reported 8 ft 2 in 2025	born 2007
Zhao Liang	China	246 cm	8 ft 1 in	Height not confirmed officially. A circus performer.	born 1982
Piocho	United States	245 cm	8 ft 0 in	Height not confirmed officially. Toured in Germany and the Netherlands in the 1920s.	fl. 1923
Barth's Giant	Ottoman Empire	244 cm	8 ft 0 in	Skeleton of reputed giant "Hayduk", Turkish soldier displayed at Vienna's Anatomical museum in 1904. Height estimated from femur and tibia at 235.2 to 244.4 cm (7 ft 8.6 in to 8 ft 0.2 in) tall.	c. 1683
Isroil Hushbokov	Uzbekistan	244 cm	8 ft 0 in	Height not confirmed officially.	born 1980
Sabah Jabbar Hadi	Iraq	243 cm	8 ft 0 in	Height not confirmed officially.	1985–2018 (33)
Musutaman	Indonesia	242 cm	7 ft 11 in	Height not confirmed officially.	born 1962
Gustaf Edman	Sweden	242 cm	7 ft 11 in	Height not confirmed officially.	1882–1912 (30)
Colonel Routh Goshen	Isle of Man	241 cm	7 ft 11 in	Known as the Arabian Giant or the Palestine Giant.	1824–1889 (64)
Maximinus Thrax	Roman Empire	240 cm	7 ft 10 in	Roman emperor between 235 and 238. Possibly one of the many exaggerations in the Historia Augusta.	173–238 (~65)
Katia D'Avilla Rodrigues	Brazil	240 cm	7 ft 10 in	Height not confirmed officially. Experts suggest she was closer To 7 ft 6.6 in (230 cm) from photographic evidence.	1963–2011 (48)
János Várnai	Hungary	238 cm	7 ft 10 in	Claims of being the tallest Hungarian in 1963.	c. 1963
Grgo Kusić	Austria-Hungary	237 cm	7 ft 9 in	Possible tallest Croat recorded as well as possible tallest person of Austria-Hungary of his time. Some sources states his height as 219 cm (7 ft 2), others at 237 cm (7 ft 9); his exact height is disputed.	1892–1918 (26)
Inga Norgestrum	United States	236 cm	7 ft 9 in	made up by Weekly World News.	?
Cornelius McGrath	Kingdom of Ireland	234 cm	7 ft 8 in	Measurement according to the London Annual Register.	1737–1759 (22)
Saint Christopher	Roman Empire	231 cm	7 ft 7 in	Saint venerated by the Roman Catholic Church. According to legend, he was 5 cubits (2.3 m (7 ft 7 in)) tall, a claimed "gigantic tooth" of St. Christopher turned out to be a tooth of hippopotamus.	3rd or 4th century AD
Ju Wu-Ba	Xin dynasty	231 cm	7 ft 7 in	Described in historical accounts such as the Eighteen Histories Abridged as a man of extraordinary height. His height was recorded as one zhang (approximately 231 cm). He is believed to have lived between AD 8 and 13, during the early Xin dynasty, and was appointed a leiwei during the Battle of Kunyang.	fl. AD 8 and 13
Sancho VII of Navarre	Kingdom of Navarre	231 cm	7 ft 7 in	Height estimated by Luis del Campo in 1952, from a measurement of his femur recorded in 1622.	1170–1234 (64)
Isiriki Unzou	Japan	227 cm	7 ft 5 in	Height not confirmed officially.	19th century
George Washout	United States	226 cm	7 ft 5 in	Height not confirmed officially.	Unknown
J.W.Patterson	United States	226 cm	7 ft 5 in	Height not confirmed officially.	1967–?
Henrik Brustad	Norway	226 cm	7 ft 5 in	Height not confirmed officially.	1844–1899 (55)
Lionel	United Kingdom	225 cm	7 ft 5 in	Height not confirmed officially.	1944–?
André René Roussimoff	France	224 cm	7 ft 4 in	Better known by his ring name André the Giant, was a French professional wrestler and actor.	1946–1993 (46)
Iso Gorou	Japan	221 cm	7 ft 3 in	Height not confirmed officially.	19century
Takamayama Keiichirou	Japan	221 cm	7 ft 3 in	Height not confirmed officially.	1832 alive
Mary Murphy	Kingdom of Ireland	215 cm	7 ft 1 in	Height not confirmed officially.	Unknown
Maria Feliciana dos Santos	Brazil	213 cm	7 ft 0 in	Maria Feliciana dos Santos grew normally until the age of 10, when her growth skyrocketed. She was a basketball player, singer and circus attraction. Her first public performances were in 1962 at the age of 16. At 18 she received the title of Queen of Height in a contest in Chacrinha. Although her height was often claimed to be 7 feet 4.4 inches (224.8 cm), her real height was probably no more than 7 feet 0 inches.	1947–?
Antoine Barada	United States	210 cm	6 ft 11 in	A real man that became a regional legend in Nebraska. Possibly was 2.1 m (7 ft) tall and could lift a stone 770 kg (1,700 lb) in weight.	August 22, 1807 – March 30, 1885/87 (77–79)
William Patterson Bane	United States	204 cm	6 ft 8 in	Claimed to be tallest soldier in the American Civil War	August 14, 1843 – March 16, 1912
Maria Scheller	Germany	204 cm	6 ft 8 in	Maria Scheller was also known as the Nuremberg Giantess (Nürnberg Giantess or Nürnberg Riesin). She was said to be 7 feet 2 inches tall, although postcards below (marked on the back as 'Maria Scheller') state her height was only 204 cm.	Unknown

== Tallest people without gigantism, acromegaly, Marfan syndrome, or other growth disorders (≥ 220 cm, 7 ft 3 in) ==
Living Deceased

Name	Country	Metric	Imperial	Note	Lifespan (age at death)
Angus MacAskill	United Kingdom	236 cm	7 ft 9 in	Tallest "true" giant until Olivier Rioux matched his height in 2024.	1825–1863 (38)
Olivier Rioux	Canada	236 cm	7 ft 9 in	Guinness World Records declared him the tallest teenager in the world in 2021.	born 2006
Bob Wegner	United States	234 cm	7 ft 8 in	Plays basketball, and was the world's tallest athlete before Olivier Rioux was measured at 7 ft 9 in (236 cm).	born 1993
Neil Fingleton	United Kingdom	233 cm	7 ft 8 in	Tallest NCAA Division I basketball player. Known for his role Mag the Mighty for the HBO TV series Game of Thrones.	1980–2017 (37)
Robert Bobroczkyi	Romania	231 cm	7 ft 7 in	Romanian basketball player who was 231 cm (7 ft 7 in) in 2017–18, aged 17.	born 2000
Manute Bol	South Sudan	231 cm	7 ft 7 in	Tied for tallest player in NBA history.	1962–2010 (48)
Ralph Madsen	United States	229 cm	7 ft 6 in	Billed as 7 ft 6 in (229 cm).	1897–1948 (51)
Yao Ming	China	229 cm	7 ft 6 in	Was the tallest player in the NBA during his playing years until his retirement in 2011.	born 1980
Shawn Bradley	United States and Germany	229 cm	7 ft 6 in	Former player in the NBA, 1993–2005, tallest living German (holding dual citizenship).	born 1972
Jérémy Gohier	Canada	229 cm	7 ft 6 in	Canadian youth basketball player.	born 2010
Martin Miklosik	Slovakia	228 cm	7 ft 6 in	Tallest basketball player in the Slovak Republic.	born 1986
Chuck Nevitt	United States	226 cm	7 ft 5 in	Former player in the NBA, 1983, 1984–1989, 1991, 1993.	born 1959
Sim Bhullar	Canada	226 cm	7 ft 5 in	Former player in the NBA, he played for the Sacramento Kings in 2014–2015 making him the tallest Canadian NBA player ever.	born 1992
Will Jacobsen	United States	226 cm	7 ft 5 in	Professional basketball player who played most of his career with the surname Foster.	born 1988
Jamarion Sharp	United States	226 cm	7 ft 5 in	Tallest college basketball player from 2021 to present.	born 2001
Nagawoo Jimaan	Ethiopia	225 cm	7 ft 5 in	Tallest living man in Ethiopia.	born 1997/98
Ivo Höger	Czech Republic	225 cm	7 ft 5 in	Tallest living man in the Czech Republic.	born 1982
Jannik Könecke	Germany	225 cm	7 ft 5 in	Tallest living man in Germany.	born 2000
Mark Eaton	United States	224 cm	7 ft 4 in	Former player in the NBA, he played for the Utah Jazz from 1982–1993.	1957–2021 (64)
Rik Smits	Netherlands	224 cm	7 ft 4 in	Former player in the NBA, he played for the Indiana Pacers from 1988–2000 making him the tallest Dutch NBA player ever.	born 1966
Priest Lauderdale	Bulgaria and United States	224 cm	7 ft 4 in	Former player in the NBA, 1996–1998.	born 1973
Michael Fusek	Slovakia	224 cm	7 ft 4 in	Slovak professional basketball player.	born 1995
Victor Wembanyama	France	224 cm	7 ft 4 in	French basketball player and the tallest active NBA player. Drafted first overall in the 2023 NBA draft. Currently plays for the San Antonio Spurs. He is the tallest living man in France.	born 2004
Michael Hayn	Germany	223 cm	7 ft 4 in	In 2019, he was unofficially considered the tallest living German.	born 1973
Kewal Shiels	Australia	223 cm	7 ft 4 in	The tallest living Australian in the world.	born 1989
Rolf Mayr	Germany	222 cm	7 ft 3 in	Former professional basketball player. Surpassed by Jannik Könecke as the tallest living man in Germany.	born 1964
Peter John Ramos	Puerto Rico	222 cm	7 ft 3 in	Former player in the NBA, he played for the Washington Wizards from 2004–2005.	born 1985
Ring Ayuel	South Sudan	222 cm	7 ft 3 in	Height disputed between sources, either 7 ft 3.5 in (222 cm), or 7 ft 4 in (224 cm).	born 1988
Gino Cuccarolo	Italy	222 cm	7 ft 3 in	Tallest man in Italy.	born 1987
Janar Purason	Estonia	222 cm	7 ft 3 in	Tallest man in Estonia.	born 1985
Vincent Pourchot	France	222 cm	7 ft 3 in	Professional basketball player. Surpassed by Victor Wembanyama as the tallest living man in France.	born 1992
Ren Keyu	China	221 cm	7 ft 3 in	Guinness World Records records him as tallest living male teenager in the world.	born 2006
Žydrūnas Ilgauskas	Lithuania	221 cm	7 ft 3 in	Former player in the NBA, 1996–2011.	born 1975
Randy Breuer	United States	221 cm	7 ft 3 in	Former player in the NBA, 1983–1994.	born 1960
Arvydas Sabonis	Lithuania	221 cm	7 ft 3 in	Former player in the NBA, he played for the Portland Trail Blazers from 1995–2001 and in the 2002–2003 season.	born 1964
Hasheem Thabeet	Tanzania	221 cm	7 ft 3 in	Former player in the NBA, 2009–2014. He is the only Tanzanian player to play in the NBA. Currently plays for Pazi in the Tanzania Basketball League	born 1987
Swede Halbrook	United States	221 cm	7 ft 3 in	Former player in the NBA, he played for the Syracuse Nationals from 1961–1962.	1933–1988 (55)
Keith Closs	United States	221 cm	7 ft 3 in	Former player in the NBA, he played for the Los Angeles Clippers from 1997–2000.	born 1976
Walter Tavares	Cape Verde	221 cm	7 ft 3 in	Former player in the NBA, 2015–2016, 2017. He is the only Cape Verdean player to play in the NBA. Currently plays for Real Madrid in the Liga ACB.	born 1992
Tibor Pleiß	Germany	221 cm	7 ft 3 in	Former player in the NBA, he played for the Utah Jazz from 2015–2016. Currently plays for Anadolu Efes S.K. in the Turkish Super League.	born 1989
Aleksandar Radojević	Bosnia and Herzegovina and Montenegro	221 cm	7 ft 3 in	Former player in the NBA, 1999–2000, 2004–2005.	born 1976
Youssoupha Fall	Senegal	221 cm	7 ft 3 in	Senegalese basketball player. Currently plays for the Nanjing Monkey Kings in the Chinese Basketball Association.	born 1995
Bol Bol	South Sudan	221 cm	7 ft 3 in	Former player in the NBA, 2019–2025. Currently a free agent.	born 1999
Zach Edey	Canada	221 cm	7 ft 3 in	Canadian basketball player and the second tallest active NBA player since being drafted in the 2024 NBA draft. Currently plays for the Memphis Grizzlies.	born 2002
Aday Mara	Spain	221 cm	7 ft 3 in	Spanish player in the NBA. Currently plays for the Oklahoma City Thunder.	born 2005
Kristaps Porziņģis	Latvia	220 cm	7 ft 3 in	Used to be the third tallest active NBA player. Currently plays for the Atlanta Hawks.	born 1995

== Tallest in various sports (≥ 200 cm, 6 ft 7 in) ==
Living Deceased

Sport	Name	Country	Metric	Imperial	Note	Lifespan	Photo
Strongman and Wrestling	Édouard Beaupré	Canada	252 cm	8 ft 3 in	Tallest strongman and wrestler.	1881–1904	
Sitting volleyball	Morteza Mehrzad	Iran	246 cm	8 ft 1 in	Tallest Paralympian and tallest sitting volleyball player.	born 1987	Morteza Mehrzad Selakjani
Basketball	Suleiman Ali Nashnush	Libya	245 cm	8 ft 0 in	Tallest basketball player in history.	1943–1991	
Wrestling	Jorge González	Argentina	232 cm	7 ft 7 in	Tallest Wrestler in WWE history.	1966–2010	
Basketball	Manute Bol	Sudan	231 cm	7 ft 7 in	Tied as tallest player in NBA history.	1962–2010	
Basketball	Gheorghe Mureșan	Romania	231 cm	7 ft 7 in	Tied as tallest player in NBA history.	born 1971	
Association football	Pavel Podkolzin	Russia	226 cm	7 ft 5 in	Tallest association football player in history. Plays as a forward.	born 1985	
Boxing	Gogea Mitu	Romania	224 cm	7 ft 4 in	Tallest professional boxer in history.	1914–1936	
Basketball	Zhang Ziyu	China	220 cm	7 ft 3 in	Tallest female basketball player.	born 2007	
Beach volleyball	Daniel Martínez Campos	Cuba	220 cm	7 ft 3 in	Tallest male beach volleyball player, though one source gives his height as 217 cm (7 ft 1 in).	born 2005	
Kickboxing and MMA	Giant Silva	Brazil	218 cm	7 ft 2 in	Joint tallest kickboxer and mixed martial artist.	born 1963	
Basketball	Margo Dydek	Poland	218 cm	7 ft 2 in	Tallest player in WNBA history.	1974–2011	Margo Dydek
Kickboxing and MMA	Hongman Choi	South Korea	218 cm	7 ft 2 in	Joint tallest kickboxer and mixed martial artist.	born 1980	
Volleyball	Dmitriy Muserskiy	Russia	218 cm	7 ft 2 in	Tallest volleyball player. Member of Russia's national team.	born 1988	Dmitriy Muserskiy
Bodybuilding	Olivier Richters	Netherlands	218 cm	7 ft 2 in	Tallest bodybuilder.	born 1989	
Ice hockey	Alexander Karmanov	Moldova	216 cm	7 ft 1 in	Tallest player drafted into the National Hockey League.	born 2008	
Cricket	Mohammad Irfan	Pakistan	216 cm	7 ft 1 in	Tallest international cricketer.	born 1982	
Baseball	Loek van Mil	Netherlands	216 cm	7 ft 1 in	Tallest baseball player.	1984–2019	Loek van Mil
Handball	Dainis Krištopāns	Latvia	215 cm	7 ft 1 in	Tallest handball player.	born 1990	
American football	Richard Sligh	United States	213 cm	7 ft 0 in	Tallest American football player in NFL history.	1944–2008	
Strongman	Ted van der Parre	Netherlands	213 cm	7 ft 0 in	Tallest World's Strongest Man competitor.	born 1955	
Boxing	Nikolai Valuev	Russia	213 cm	7 ft 0 in	Tallest boxing world champion.	born 1973	
Rugby	Richard Metcalfe	United Kingdom	213 cm	7 ft 0 in	Tallest rugby union player.	born 1973	
MMA	Stefan Struve	Netherlands	213 cm	7 ft 0 in	Tallest fighter in the UFC.	born 1988	
Kickboxing	Semmy Schilt	Netherlands	212 cm	6 ft 11 in	Tallest kickboxing world champion.	born 1973	
Baseball	Jon Rauch	United States	211 cm	6 ft 11 in	Tied as tallest baseball player in MLB history.	born 1978	
Tennis	Ivo Karlović	Croatia	211 cm	6 ft 11 in	Tied as tallest tennis player on the ATP Tour.	born 1979	
Australian football	Peter Street	Australia	211 cm	6 ft 11 in	Tied as tallest player in AFL history.	born 1980	
Australian football	Aaron Sandilands	Australia	211 cm	6 ft 11 in	Tied as tallest player in AFL history.	born 1982	Aaron Sandilands and Lance Whitnall
Australian football	Mason Cox	United States	211 cm	6 ft 11 in	Tied as tallest player in AFL history.	born 1991	
Rugby	Will Carrick-Smith	United Kingdom	211 cm	6 ft 11 in	Tallest active professional rugby union player.	born 1992	
Baseball	Sean Hjelle	United States	211 cm	6 ft 11 in	Tied as tallest baseball player in MLB history.	born 1997	
Tennis	Reilly Opelka	United States	211 cm	6 ft 11 in	Tied as tallest tennis player on the ATP Tour.	born 1997	
Volleyball	Miranda Weber	Canada	211 cm	6 ft 11 in	Tallest female volleyball player.	born 2000	
Beach volleyball	Maria Daineko	Russia	209 cm	6 ft 10 in	Tallest female beach volleyball player.	born 2000	
Darts	Jimmy van Schie	Netherlands	207 cm	6 ft 9 in	Tallest professional darts player.	born 1993	Jimmy van Schie
Ice hockey	Zdeno Chára	Slovakia	206 cm	6 ft 9 in	Tied as tallest player in NHL history.	born 1977	Zdeno Chára
Ice hockey	Curtis Douglas	Canada	206 cm	6 ft 9 in	Tied as tallest player in NHL history.	born 2000	
Pole vault	Jeremy Scott	United States	206 cm	6 ft 9 in	Tallest world class pole vaulter.	born 1981	
Association football	Florian Wiegele	Austria	205 cm	6 ft 9 in	Tallest footballer in the FIFA World Cup history.	born 2001	
Association football	Lucas Bergström	Finland	205 cm	6 ft 9 in	Tallest footballer in La Liga history.	born 2002	Lucas Bergström
Alpine skiing	Ramon Zenhäusern	Switzerland	202 cm	6 ft 8 in	Tallest World Cup competitor in alpine skiing.	born 1992	
Golf	Phil Blackmar	United States	201 cm	6 ft 7 in	Tallest golfer on the PGA Tour.	born 1957	
Sprinting	Ingo Schultz	Germany	201 cm	6 ft 7 in	Tallest Olympic sprinter.	born 1975	

== See also ==
- Giant human skeletons
- Human height
- List of heaviest people
- List of people with dwarfism
- List of the verified shortest people
- Sotos syndrome
