= Zhao Liang =

Zhao Liang may refer to:

- Zhao Liang (circus performer) (born 1982), Chinese circus performer known for his record-setting height
- Zhao Liang (director) (born circa 1971), Chinese documentary filmmaker
- Zhao Liang (football), Chinese football referee
- Zhao Liang (actor), Chinese actor credited as Liang Zhao (Red Firecracker, Green Firecracker)
