= Syzonenko =

Syzonenko or Sizonenko (Ukrainian: Сизоненко) is a gender-neutral Ukrainian surname. Notable people with the surname include:

- Alexander Sizonenko (1959–2012), Soviet-Ukrainian basketball player
- Denys Syzonenko (born 1984), Ukrainian swimmer
- Inna Syzonenko (born 1984), Swedish actress of Ukrainian origin
