= Pornchai =

Pornchai (Thai: พรชัย, RTGS: Phonchai) is a Thai masculine given name. Notable people with the name include:

- Pornchai Ardjinda (born 1984), footballer
- Pornchai Kaokaew (born 1981), sepak takraw player
- Pornchai Mongkhonvanit (born 1958), president of the Siam University in Bangkok
- Pornchai Saosri (1989 – 2015), unconfirmed world record claimant of tallest human of all time
- Pornchai Thongburan (born 1974), boxer
- Pornchai Wongsriudomporn, one of the producers of Inhuman Kiss
