= Alam Channa =

Tallest living man between 1982–1998

Haji Mohammad Alam Channa
- Born: c. 1954; Bachal Channa Village, Sehwan, Sindh, Pakistan
- Died: July 2, 1998 (aged 44–45); Valhalla, New York, U.S.
- Other names: Channa
- Occupations: Town Committee Employee, Blue Collar Worker at Sehwan Sharif Mazar
- Height: 7 ft 8 in (234 cm)

Haji Mohammad Alam Channa (1954 – 2 July 1998) was a Pakistani farmer who was one of the tallest living people with the height of 7.8 feet (2.4 m). According to the Guinness Book of World Records, he was the tallest living man in the world between 1982 and 1998. Before his death in 1998, Channa was reported to be 7.7 feet (2.3 m) tall.

== Biography ==
Born in 1954 in the city of Sehwan in Sindh, Alam Channa is said to have stood 6 feet 4 inches (193 cm) by the time he was 18. He continued to grow taller till he was 26. Channa belonged to an indigent Sindhi family. He could not get any significant education. He got married in 1989 and have son born in Chicago in August 1990 namely Abid Ali Channa presently he lives in Houston.

In 1981, a man who had watched Channa at the Dargah Hazrat Lal Shahbaz Qalandar Sehwan Sharif and sent a letter and some photos of Channa to the Guinness Book of World Records.

Months later, some officials went to Sehwan and measured Channa at 7 feet 8 inches (234 cm). Channa's was listed in the Guinness book as the tallest living human on earth.

== Death ==
He suffered from kidney failure and high blood pressure. The government decided to send him to the US and finance his treatment. He was admitted to the Westchester Medical Center in Valhalla, New York but died there on Thursday 2 July 1998. He was buried in Sehwan.

== See also ==
- Naseer Soomro
- List of tallest people

Preceded by Parimal Barman	Tallest Recognized Person; 1982 – 1998	Succeeded by Ri Myung Hun
