= Ren Keyu =

Chinese student who is the tallest teenager as of 2020

- Born: Ren Keyu; October 18, 2006 (age 19); Leshan, Sichuan, China
- Known for: Verified tallest male teenager
- Height: 7 ft 3.02 in (221 cm)

Ren Keyu (born October 18, 2006), is a man from Leshan, Sichuan, China who was known for being the tallest male teenager in 2020 with a height of 221.03 cm (7 ft 3.02 in). His nickname is Xiaoyu (Chinese: 小宇). He applied to Guinness World Records in August 2020 for being considered as the tallest male teenager. On October 18, 2020, a Guinness World Records official, a doctor from The People's Hospital of Leshan, and a Red Star News reporter participated in measuring Ren or acting as witnesses. They measured him three times that day at 8 am, 2 pm, and 8 pm. On November 18, 2020, Guinness World Records announced he was the tallest male teenager.

His maternal grandmother is 175 cm (5 ft 9 in), his maternal grandfather and mother are both over 190 cm (6 ft 3 in), his father is over 180 cm (5 ft 11 in), and his paternal grandparents are over 170 cm (5 ft 7 in). Owing to his being 150 cm (4 ft 11 in) in kindergarten, his family brought him for a medical examination. Doctors initially thought he had gigantism before realising that there was nothing abnormal with his growth hormone and pituitary gland. Basketball coaches sought him to play on their teams when he was an elementary school student but he was unable to because he has flat feet and osteochondroma and struggles with demanding exercise. By the time he was 11 years old, doctors had performed four surgeries on his feet. When he was 11 years old at 206 cm (6 ft 9 in) and 105 kg (231 lb), he had trouble walking for long periods of time owing to his height and weight. He enjoys reading fairy tales and science fiction. An avid participant in esports, he aims to become an esports player.

== See also ==
- List of tallest people
