= Julius Koch =

German giant (1872 – 1902)

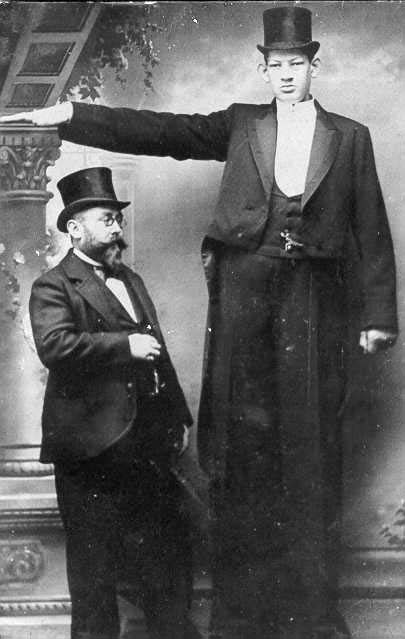
- Koch standing next to an average male, 1899
- Born: 1872; Reutlingen, German Empire
- Died: 30 March 1902 (aged 29–30); Mons, Belgium
- Other name: Le Geant Constantin
- Height: 2.46 m (8 ft 1 in)

Julius Koch (1872 – 30 March 1902), also known as Le Géant Constantin ("Constantin the Giant"), was one of the tallest people ever. He suffered from gigantism, with an enlarged pituitary gland, testicular atrophy and lack of sexual development, and had trouble walking. His height, 245.9 cm (8 ft 0.8 in) was based on an estimate: after a series of falls, his legs were badly injured, and they were amputated after gangrene set in. His height had been advertised as 2.59 m (8 ft 6 in), but this was presumed to be an exaggeration, as the skeleton measures 8 ft 1 in (2.46 cm). Because he lived at the same time as John Rogan, he was probably never the tallest man in the world. At the age of 14 years, he reportedly already measured 1.94 m (6 ft 4 in). Koch's femurs were the longest ever measured, at 76 cm (30 in), and his hands were reportedly 37.6 cm (14.8 in) long. His feet were claimed to have a length of 44 cm (17 in).

Koch died in Mons, Belgium on 30 March 1902. His skeleton is preserved in the Museum of Natural History in Mons, Belgium.

Koch was the star of an early short film, The Giant Constantin, released in 1902. In 1899 he appeared at the London Pavilion and the Folies Bergère in Paris. During 1901 and 1902, he appeared in Mons as a fairground attraction.
