= William Patterson Bane =

Tallest soldier claimant (1843–1912)

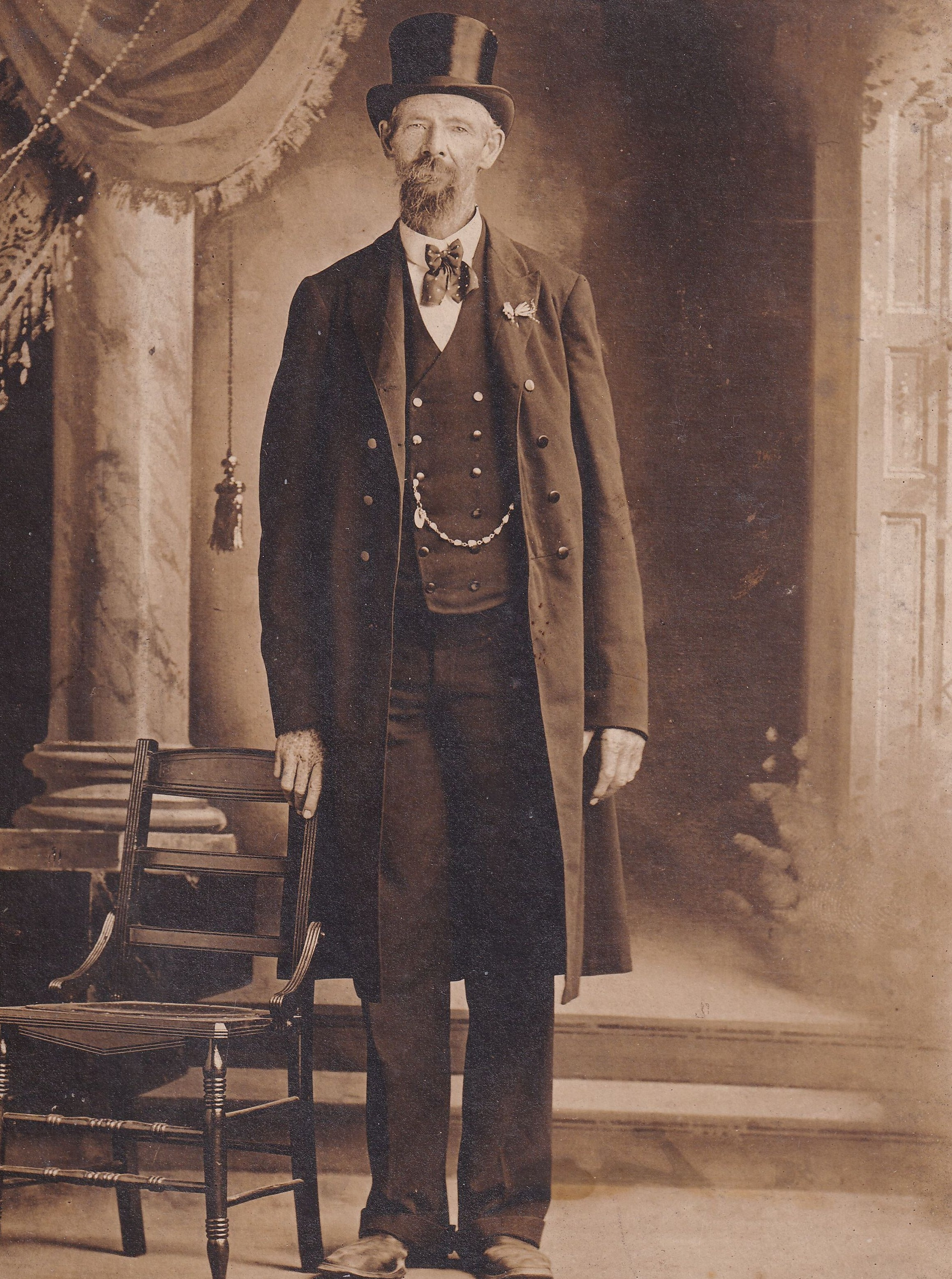
- Undated photograph of William Patterson Bane
- Born: August 14, 1843; Washington County, Pennsylvania, U.S.
- Died: March 16, 1912 (aged 68); Washington County, Pennsylvania, U.S.
- Other names: Big Pat Bane; Greene County Giant
- Known for: Claim to be the tallest soldier in the American Civil War
- Height: 6 ft 9 in (206 cm)

Signature
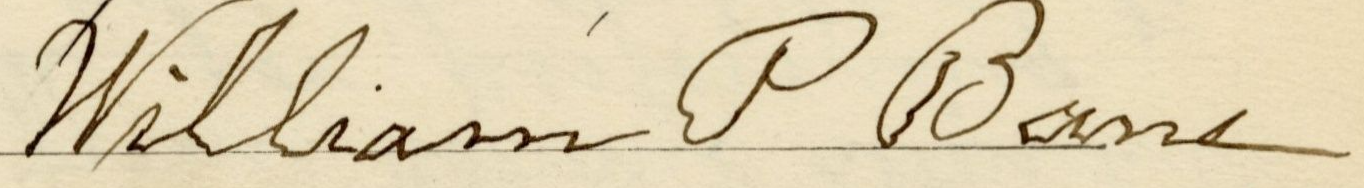

William Patterson Bane (August 14, 1843 – March 16, 1912) was an American soldier noted for his height. He was considered the tallest soldier to have fought in the American Civil War, but was shorter than Martin Van Buren Bates.

== Life ==
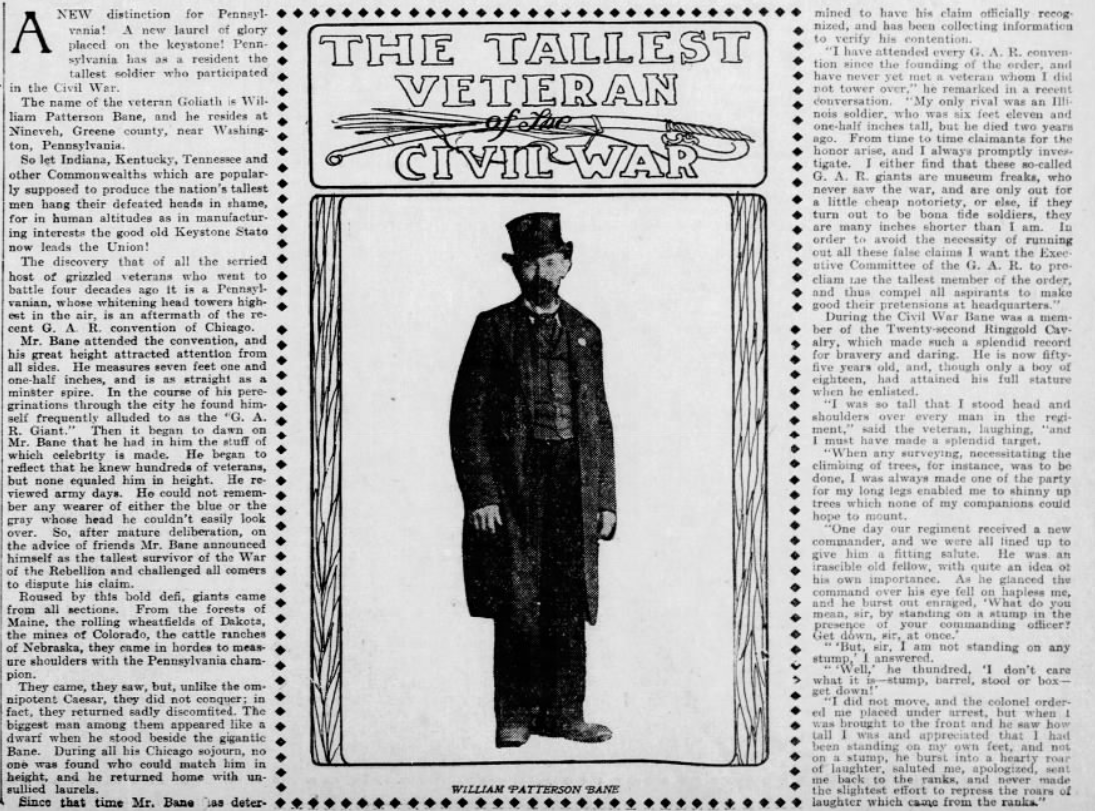
Article about Banes published by The Philadelphia Inquirer on December 9, 1900.

William Patterson Bane was born in Washington County, Pennsylvania, on August 14, 1843, the son of William Bane. His father was a justice of the peace in Dallas, West Virginia. Bane's family were Scotch-Irish Americans and he had a brother who died in the American Civil War.

In June 1862, Patterson enlisted into the Union army and assigned to the 22nd Pennsylvania Cavalry Regiment, but did not participate in any close fighting. He was a farmer and initially received a military pension of $12 per month before his unsuccessful appeal to increase it to $30 resulted it in being increased to $17. In 1907, U.S. Representative Ernest F. Acheson proposed legislation to increase Bane's pension to $36.

Bane's height received coverage in newspapers across the United States as the tallest soldier in the Civil War and he received the nicknames Big Pat Bane and Greene County Giant. However, Martin Van Buren Bates was taller than him. His military records listed different heights ranging from 6 feet 5 inches on his enlistment records to over 8 feet according to The Day Book. Neely Tucker stated that the listing of 6 feet 9 inches on his surgeon's certificate was the most consistent height given for him and that his shorter height on the enlistment record might have been used to circumvent medical regulations. He attended the Louisiana Purchase Exposition in 1904, and declined offers to be an attraction.

Bane suffered from bronchitis later in life and died in Washington County, on March 16, 1912.

== Works cited ==
=== Newspapers ===
- "Death of "Pat" Bane". The Daily Herald. March 18, 1912. p. 4 – via Newspapers.com.
- "Good Stories For All". The Boston Globe. January 25, 1898. p. 8 – via Newspapers.com.
- "In Behalf of "Pat."". Monongahela Valley Republican. January 31, 1907. p. 4 – via Newspapers.com.
- "Pays Visit To The Exposition". The Daily Herald. November 3, 1904. p. 1 – via Newspapers.com.
- "William Patterson Bane Death". The Waynesburg Republican. March 21, 1912. p. 4 – via Newspapers.com.
- "Would Not Be Vaccinated". The Daily Herald. August 17, 1908. p. 4 – via Newspapers.com.

=== Web ===
- "Approved Pension File for Private William P. Bane, Company A, 22nd Pennsylvania Cavalry Regiment (SC-354483)". National Archives and Records Administration. July 14, 1909. Archived from the original on March 10, 2025.
- Tucker, Neely (February 18, 2025). "Big Pat Bane, Tallest Soldier in the Civil War?". Library of Congress. Archived from the original on March 10, 2025.
