= Brahim Takioullah =

Second-tallest living person

- Born: 26 January 1982 (age 44); Guelmim, Morocco
- Known for: Second tallest living man in the world
- Height: 8 ft 0.97 in (246.30 cm)

Brahim Takioullah (Arabic: ابراهيم تقي الله; born 26 January 1982) is a French-Moroccan man who formerly held the Guinness World Record for largest feet and is officially the second-tallest living person.

== Personal life ==
Takioullah was born in Guelmim, Morocco, in 1982. At the age of 18, he had been asked by his school doctor to get a blood test, for his "unusual" size. Diagnosed with acromegaly, Takioullah, in a single year had a 1-metre (3.3 ft) high growth spurt. After obtaining his university degree in geography, a French doctor took Takioullah to Paris in 2006, for treatment. His treatment was successful as his tumour was removed and the growth hormone level in his blood was brought down to normal. His heart was also reported in a good condition.

Takioullah had difficulties finding a pair of European size-58 shoes. He once asked a cobbler to make him a pair of made-to-measure shoes, but he was told that they would cost up to 3,500 euros. His orthopedic podiatrist, Jerome Liegeon, fitted him with a specially made pair of shoes, specifically designed to support his weight. Takioullah works for an attraction park, "Saint-Paul", near the city of Beauvais, about 80 km (50 mi) north of Paris. People can take pictures with Brahim, who has now also obtained French nationality.

== Records ==
Surpassing former record-holder, Sultan Kösen, Takioullah became the Guinness World Record holder for world's largest feet on a living person, on 24 May 2011. His left foot measures 38.1 centimetres (1 ft 3 in), and his right 37.5 centimetres (1 ft 2.8 in).

With a height of 2.46 metres (8 ft 1 in), Takioullah is the second–tallest living person behind Sultan Kösen of Turkey, and tied with Morteza Mehrzad of Iran, in the world according to the Guinness World Records.

== See also ==
- List of tallest people
- Guinness World Records

Preceded by Sultan Kösen	World's largest feet on a living person 24 May 2011 – 6 October 2014	Succeeded by Jeison Orlando Rodríguez
