= Alexander Sizonenko =

Soviet basketball player

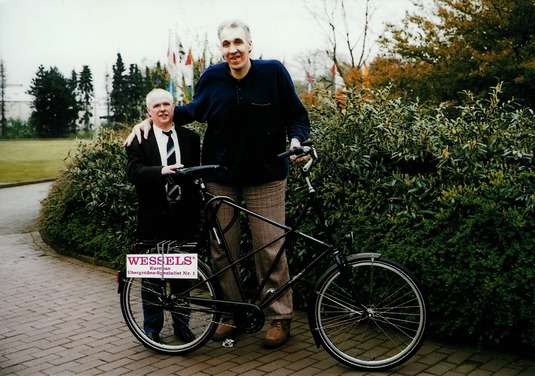
- Sizonenko (right) and Georg Wessels

Personal information
- Born: 20 July 1959 Zaporizhzhia, Ukrainian SSR, Soviet Union
- Died: 5 January 2012 (aged 52) Saint Petersburg, Russia
- Listed height: 7 ft 11 in (2.41 m)

Career information
- Playing career: 1976–1986
- Position: Center

Career history
- 1976–1978: Spartak Leningrad
- 1979–1986: Stroitel Kuybyshev

Alexander Alekseyevich Sizonenko (Ukrainian: Олександр Олексійович Сизоненко; Russian: Александр Алексеевич Сизоненко; 20 July 1959 – 5 January 2012) was a Soviet professional basketball player. Possibly the tallest person to have ever played professional basketball, he was measured by Guinness World Records at 2.39 m (7 ft 10 in) and named the world's tallest man in 1991. Sizonenko was said to have grown since this measurement was taken, although age reduced his standing height considerably. Because of his enormous growth, his mobility was increasingly impaired.

== Basketball career ==
Sizonenko played professionally for Spartak Leningrad (1976–1978) and for Stroitel Kuybyshev (1979–1986). Sizonenko was also a member of the Soviet national team and appeared on its behalf for 12 games. While playing, Sizonenko was listed as standing at 2.41 m (7 ft 11 in).

According to Viktor Petrakov, the 1977 European vice-champion, Sizonenko was a poor basketball player with weak functional abilities.

== Personal life ==
Sizonenko was born in the city of Zaporizhzhia, Ukrainian SSR. He lived in Saint Petersburg, was divorced and had a son Alexander born in 1994. In the last years of his life, he faced multiple health issues. In 2011 he was moved to a hospital in St. Petersburg, where he died on 5 January 2012. He was 52.

Preceded by Zeng Jinlian	Tallest Recognized Person; 1991	Succeeded by Parimal Barman
