= Willie Camper =

One of the tallest humans in recorded history

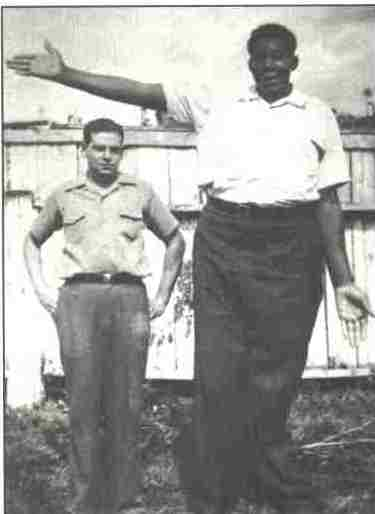
- Born: Guicel Camper; October 1, 1924; Memphis, Tennessee, U.S.
- Died: April 30, 1943 (aged 18); Martinez, California, U.S.
- Other names: The Giant; Big Willie; Willie
- Occupation: Performer
- Known for: 4th tallest verified man and 2nd tallest African-American in history
- Height: 8 ft 2 in (2.49 m)

Guicel "Willie" Camper (October 1, 1924 – April 30, 1943) was an American man and performer who is notable for being the fourth verified tallest man in medical history to have reached the height of 8 feet (240 cm) or more. At the time of his death at the age of 18, his death certificate reached the height of 8 ft 2 in (2.49 m) which disputes his 8 ft 7 in claim. He also wore size 32 shoes. He is the 2nd tallest recorded African-American, though likely being the tallest person from the time after Robert Wadlow's death. Robert was 8 ft 11 in, making him roughly 9 inches taller than Willie.

== Life ==
Camper was born in Memphis, Tennessee and his abnormal growth started around the age of nine. As he grew older, Camper worked as a performer. His unusual growth was caused by gigantism and problems with his thyroid. Up until his death, he was said to have never stopped growing.

He died of a heart attack in 1943 while performing at a sideshow in Martinez, California. He was buried in Mendenhall, Mississippi in a coffin that was 9 ft (2.7 m) long. His burial location remains largely unknown.

== See also ==
- Gigantism
- List of tallest people
