= Jongkuch Mach =

Australian basketball player (born 2007)

No. 18 – Centre of Excellence
- Position: Center
- League: NBL1 East

Personal information
- Born: October 8, 2007 (age 19) Perth, Western Australia, Australia
- Listed height: 229 cm (7 ft 6 in)

Career history
- 2025-: BA Centre of Excellence

Jongkuch Mach (born 8 October 2007), also called "JK", is an Australian basketball player who plays as a centre. He currently competes for the BA Centre of Excellence in the NBL1 East.

== Early life ==
Mach was born and raised in Perth, Western Australia and is of South Sudanese descent.

Mach did not compete in organised sports until he was 14 years old. By this age, he had reached 193 cm (6 ft 4 in). Now at 229 cm (7 ft 6 in), Mach is only 3 cm (1 in) shorter than the two tallest people who have ever played in the NBA, Gheorghe Mureșan and Manute Bol. As of 2026, he matches Tacko Fall, the current tallest NBA player in height.

Mach moved to Canberra for his basketball career. He reportedly keeps in touch with his family in Perth by calling his siblings every day.

== Basketball career ==
=== Centre of Excellence and NBL1 ===
Mach competes for the BA Centre of Excellence in the NBL1 East, the second-tier senior league in Australia, representing the Australian Institute of Sport. He has received college offers from Louisiana State University, Colorado and Santa Clara.

Mach was part of the NBL Next Stars team at the 2026 adidas Eurocamp, which won the competition. He has been praised for his shot-blocking skills, with the highest number of blocks per game (3).

Mach has said that in the future, he would like to be "in San Antonio, playing with Victor Wembanyama.

== See also ==
- List of tallest people
