= Suleiman Ali Nashnush =

Libyan basketball player (1943–1991)

- سليمان علي نشنوش
- Born: 1943; Tripoli, Libya
- Died: February 25, 1991 (aged 47–48)
- Height: 8 ft 0.4 in (244.9 cm)

Suleiman Ali (1943 – February 25, 1991) was a Libyan basketball player and actor and one of 29 known people in medical history to have verifiably reached a height of 8 feet (240 cm) or more.

He was the tallest basketball player ever at 244.9 cm (8 ft 2/5 in) although he was only 239 cm (7 ft 10 in) when he played professional basketball.

Nashnush also had a small role in Federico Fellini's film Fellini Satyricon where he played the role of Tryphaena's attendant. He died on February 25, 1991.

== See also ==
- List of tallest people

Preceded by Gabriel Estêvão Monjane	Tallest Recognized Person; 1990 – 1991	Succeeded by Parimal Barman
