= Anton de Franckenpoint =

First verified person to be 8ft tall

Anton de Franckenpoint (known as Langer Anton, "Long Anton"; fl. 16th century AD) (died 1596) was the first verified person to reach 8 feet (244 cm), or more in height. Anton, along with Christopher Munster, was working as a personal guard of Christian, Duke of Brunswick-Lüneburg.

== Skeleton ==
In 1810, his skeleton was added to the Museum Anatomicum in Marburg. His skeleton is not complete, both arms are missing, his shoulder blades are not connected, his breastbones are missing, and his feet are made of cork, and one of its legs disconnected from hips.

== See also ==
- List of tallest people
- List of people with gigantism
