= Gogea Mitu =

Romanian boxer

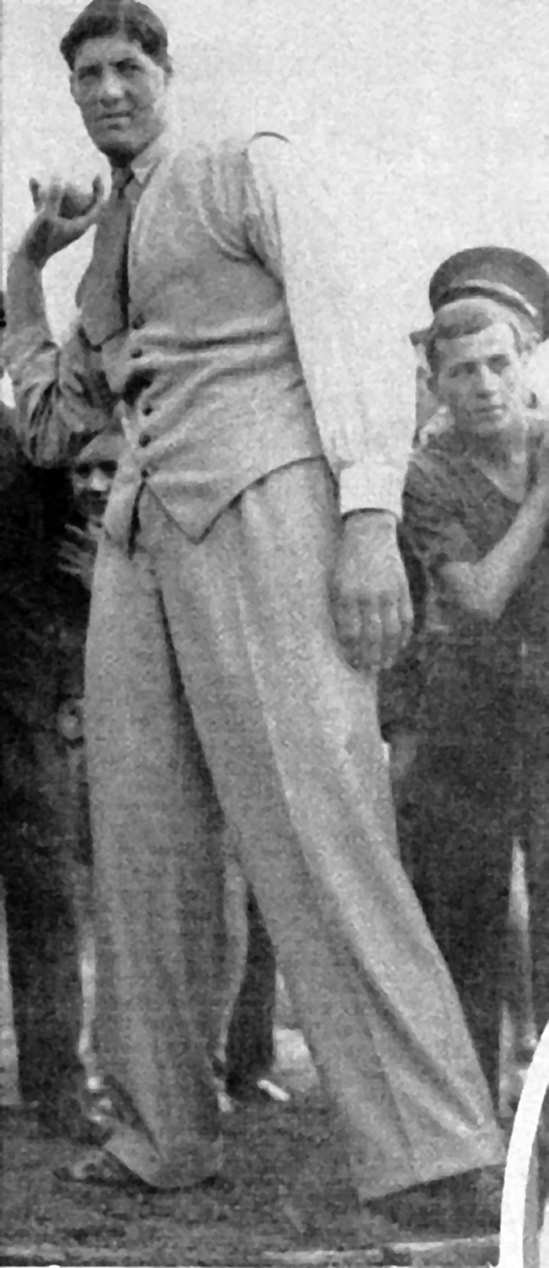

Personal information
- Nicknames: Giant of Mârsani, Goliath of Romania
- Nationality: Romanian
- Born: Dumitru Ștefănescu; September 15, 1909 Mârsani, Dolj County, Kingdom of Romania
- Died: June 8, 1936 (aged 26) Bucharest, Bucharest-Ilfov, Romania
- Height: 2.24 m (7 ft 4 in)
- Weight: Heavyweight

Boxing career
- Stance: Orthodox

Boxing record
- Total fights: 2
- Wins: 2
- Win by KO: 2

Dumitru Ștefănescu (September 15, 1909 – June 8, 1936), better known as Gogea Mitu, was a Romanian professional boxer. Mitu is also listed by the Guinness Book of World Records as the tallest professional boxer.

== Biography ==
Mitu was born in Mârsani, near Craiova, in 1909, the oldest of eleven children, his mother being only 16 when she delivered him. Mitu became world-famous because of his enormous stature. He is listed with various heights, among them 2.36 m (7 ft 9 in), 2.42 m (7 ft 11 1/2 in), 2.44 m (8 ft 0 in) and 2.49 m (8 ft 2 in).

Because of these characteristics he was very sought after by doctors and scientists who wanted to know the reason for his gigantism and by people who wanted to profit from his stature. It was said that he was highly intelligent; despite not going to school, he learned to read by himself at the age of three, as he had the stature of a five–six year old child. By age 17 he had become so famous that a circus owner from Prague offered him a job, to be presented as a human rarity. He also presented shows at the Globus Circus in Monaco. His circus career was brief, but very fortunate, because he was spotted by the successful Italian boxer and talent scout Umberto Lancia, who taught Mitu how to box and later became his manager. Gogea Mitu went to Paris to attend the famous Paris School for Boxing and after graduating he started his boxing career. He also had a brother named Tudorel, but he died at the age of seven. He was 1.80 m (5 ft 11 in) tall.

== Boxing career ==
His first boxing match took place on the Stadionul Venus in Bucharest and his opponent was the experienced Italian boxer Saverio Grizzo. Mitu won by knockout in the first round. His second fight was against former Romanian heavyweight champion Dumitru Pavelescu, which Mitu won again by knockout in the first round. It was also Mitu's last fight as a professional boxer.

== Death ==
Returning from Istanbul to Bucharest by train, he caught a cold and his manager suggested that before going home to Mârșani, he should remain in Bucharest for a few days to recover, but his condition got worse, and he was taken to "Filantropia" Hospital. On June 8, 1936, he died due to tuberculosis at the age of 26.

== Professional boxing record ==
2 fights	2 wins	0 losses
By knockout	2	0

No.	Result	Record	Opponent	Type	Round	Date	Location	Notes
2	Win	2–0	Dumitru Pavelescu	KO	1 (10)	Oct 27, 1935	Gibb Hall, Bucharest, Romania	
1	Win	1–0	Saverio Grizzo	KO	1 (6)	Jun 7, 1935	Stadionul Venus, Bucharest, Romania	

== See also ==
- List of tallest people
- Gheorghe Mureșan (born 1971), a tall Romanian basketball player
- Robert Bobroczky (born 2000), a tall Romanian basketball player
