= Mounir Fourar =

Mounir Fourar (Arabic: منير فورار) (born in Batna, Algeria, the November 28, 1972 – 3 January 2012) was one of the tallest men in the world. He claimed a height of 2.44 m (8 ft), however, this has not been independently verified. His shoe size was 64, suit size was 160, his hand measured 28 centimeters and he weighed 396 pounds (180 kg).

He suffered an acromegaly gigantism within an adenoma of his pituitary gland at the age of 12, he grew of 7 cm per month (84 cm on one year). He underwent five surgical operations in a hospital in Algiers before stopping his growing.

In Algeria, Mounir participated in hidden camera TV shows.
