= Michael Fusek =

Slovak professional basketball player (born 1995)

No. 6 – Nitra Blue Wings
- Position: Center
- League: SBL

Personal information
- Born: June 5, 1995 (age 31)
- Listed height: 7 ft 4 in (2.24 m)
- Listed weight: 222 lb (101 kg)

Career information
- NBA draft: 2017: undrafted
- Playing career: 2014–present

Career history
- 2014–2018: Spirou Charleroi
- 2018–2022: BK Inter Bratislava
- 2022–2024: Spišskí Rytieri
- 2024–present: Nitra Blue Wings

Michael Fusek (born June 5, 1995) is a Slovak professional basketball player. He stands 2.24 m (7’4’’) tall and plays center. He was projected by some media outlets to be a potential 2017 NBA draft pick.

== Career ==
Fusek left his native Slovakia in 2012 to sign with Belgian powerhouse Spirou Charleroi. In his first two years with the club, Fusek played for Charleroi's development team in the third Belgian division and their under 21 youth squad. He played his first minutes in Belgium's top-flight and in the Eurocup during the 2014–15 season, while continuing to gain playing time in the reserves. In June 2016, he attended the Adidas Eurocamp in Treviso, Italy. An early entry candidate for the 2016 NBA draft, he later opted to withdraw his name.

In the off-seasons of 2015 and 2016, Fusek went to Rockville, Maryland, to work with trainer Blair O'Donovan, a strength and conditioning specialist. His main objective there was to gain muscle. He left Charleroi in 2018 and moved to BK Inter Bratislava.

In August 2022, he was announced as a newcomer at Spišskí Rytieri, also of the Slovak Basketball League. In 2024, Fusek joined the Nitra Blue Wings.

== Personal life ==
Fusek's mother was also a professional basketball player.

== See also ==
- List of tallest people
