= Hồ Văn Trung (giant) =

Vietnamese that stands at 257.2 cm

- Born: December 8, 1984; Ca Mau, Vietnam
- Died: November 2, 2019 (aged 34)
- Occupation: Farmer
- Known for: Tallest verified Vietnamese person
- Height: 2.57 m (8 ft 5 in)

Hồ Văn Trung (8 December 1984 – 2 November 2019) was one of only 29 known people in medical history to reach a height of 8 feet (244 cm) or more. He had a standing height of at least 8 ft 5.25 in (257.2 cm), placing him as the 6th tallest man in history.

== Early life ==
Hồ Văn Trung was born in Ca Mau in 1984 and was the first of four children. Due to his family being poor his parents had to make a living selling coconuts, which was not enough to cover the family's living expenses. Later, Trung moved to Viên An Đông commune, Ngọc Hiển district and worked as a shrimp farmer in order to financially support his family.

== Later life ==
According to Trung's family, he was 5 ft 7 in (170 cm) at age of 17 when he developed a fever which persisted for a prolonged period of time. After recovering from the fever, he experienced an abnormal growth in height. By 2014, he reached 7 ft 8.5 in (235 cm) tall and weighed 110 kg (244 pounds). Doctors attributed his growth to a pituitary gland disease. In 2018, he was admitted to the hospital for kidney failure. At the time he was determined to be about 8 ft 2.5 in (250 cm), although he had a dislocated knee and was still growing. His coffin measured 10 ft 0 in (304.8 cm). The men who made his coffin said his final height was 9 ft 0.25 in (275 cm) tall, which, if true, would make him taller than Robert Wadlow.

== See also ==
- Bao Xishun
- Robert Wadlow
- Leonid Stadnyk
- Sultan Kösen
- Vikas Uppal

Preceded by Trần Thành Phố	Tallest Recognized Vietnamese Person Ever; 2019	Succeeded by Incumbent
