= Zhan Shichai =

Chinese giant and performer (1841–1893)

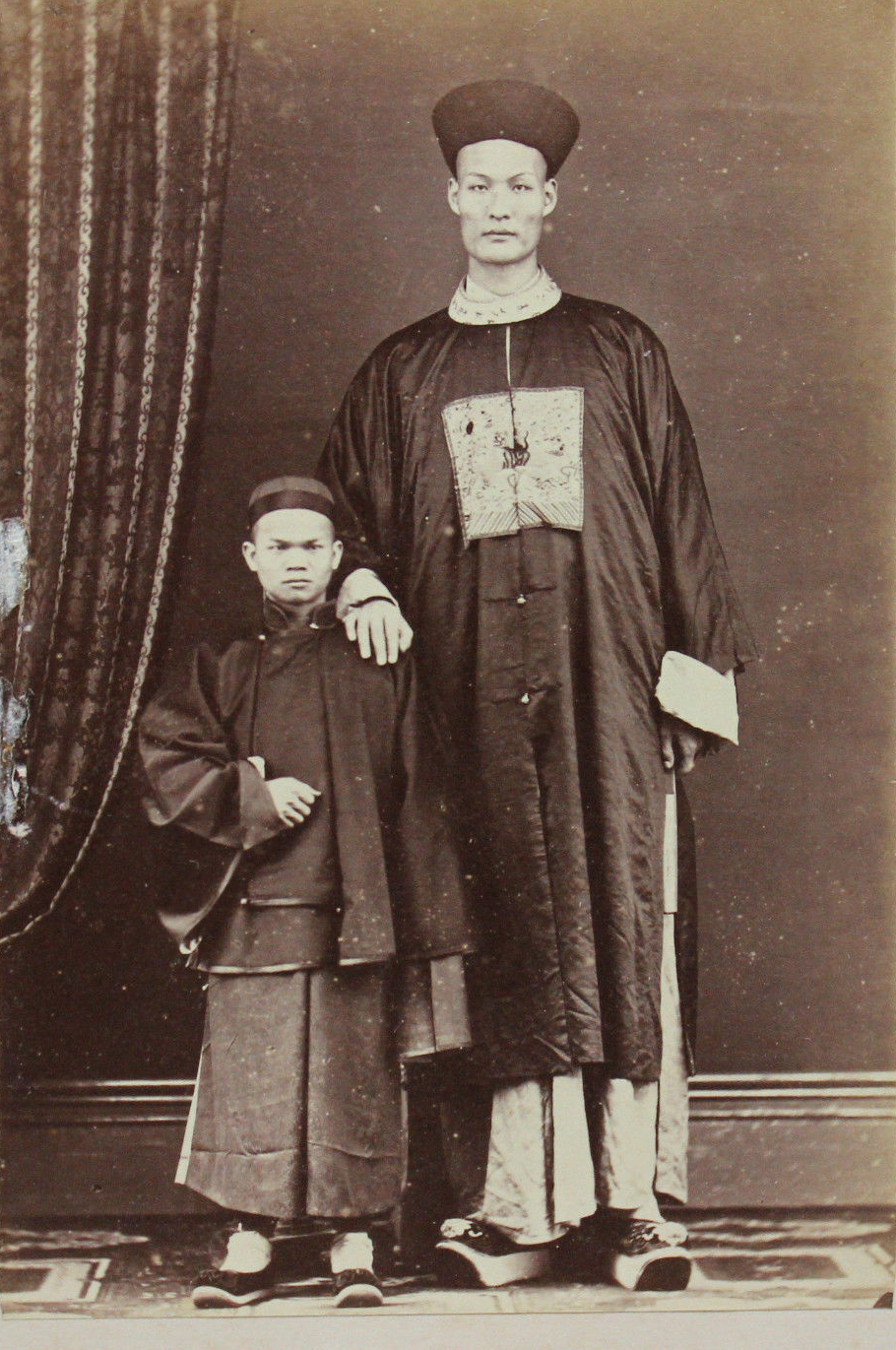
Zhan Shichai standing next to the photographer Lai Afong

Zhan Shichai (Chinese: 詹世釵) (20 December 1841 – 5 November 1893) was a Chinese man who toured the world as "Chang the Chinese Giant" in the 19th century; his stage name was "Chang Woo Gow".

Zhan was born in Fuzhou, Fujian Province, in 1841. His height was claimed to be over 8 feet (2.44 m), but there are no authoritative records. He left Qing China in 1865 to travel to London where he appeared on stage, later travelling around Europe, and to the U.S. and Australia as "Chang the Chinese Giant". Zhan received a good education in various countries, and developed a good understanding of ten languages. In America, he earned a salary of $500 a month (equivalent to $16,700 a month today).

Zhan's first wife, Kin Foo, accompanied him on his trip across Europe, and she performed alongside her husband until she fell ill and died while traveling to Australia in 1871. The following year, Zhan later married Catherine Santley, a Liverpudlian whom he met in Sydney, Australia. They had two children: Edwin, born in 1877 in Shanghai, and Ernest, born in 1879 in Paris.

In 1878, Zhan retired from the stage and settled in Bournemouth, where he opened a Chinese teahouse and a store selling Chinese imports.

Zhan died in Bournemouth in 1893 at 51 years of age, four months after his wife. His coffin was 8 feet 6 inches (2.6 m) long.

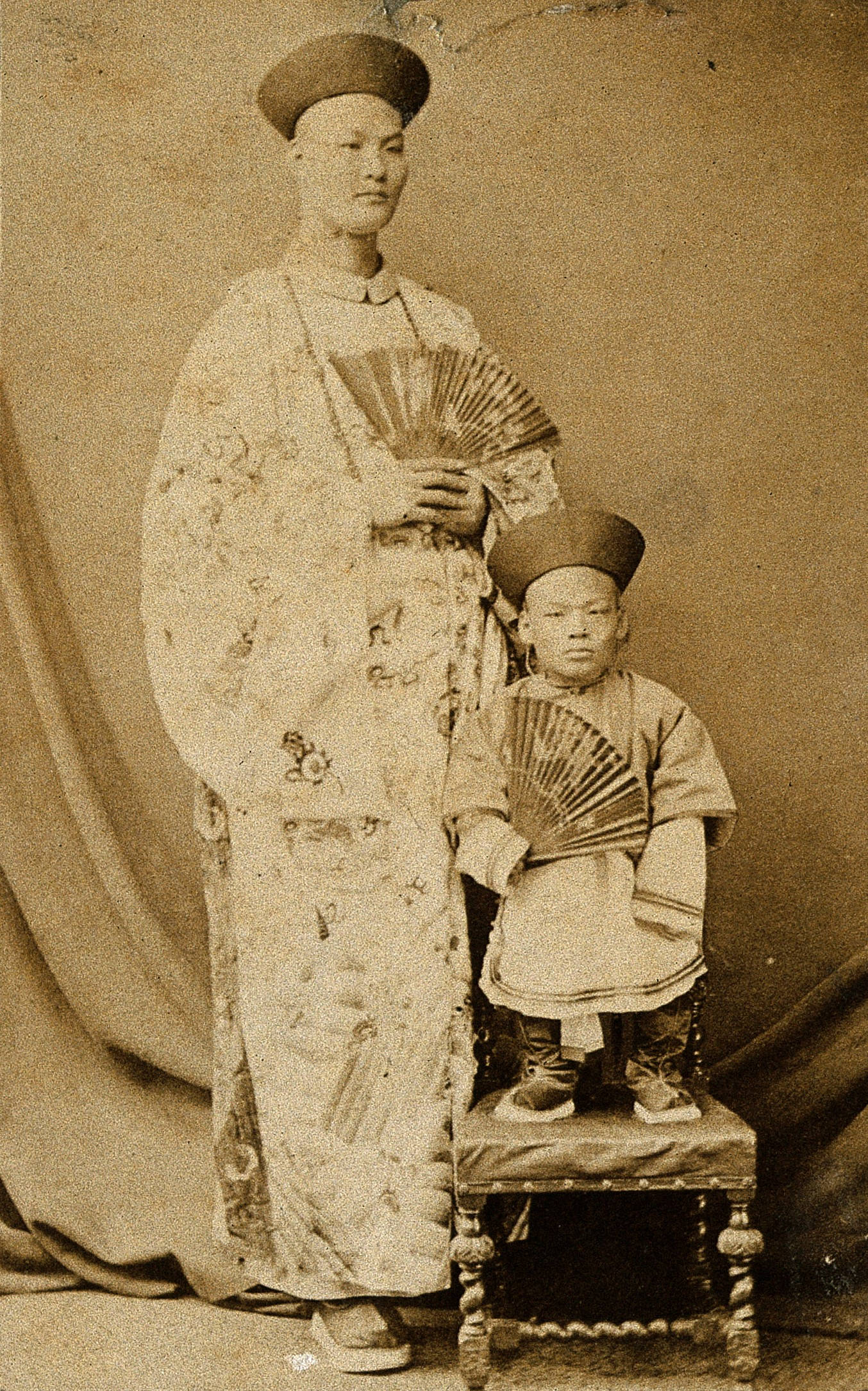
Chang Yu-sing the Chinese giant, and Chung Mow, his attendant dwarf

== See also ==
- Gigantism
- List of tallest people
- List of humans with gigantism
