= Jakob Nacken =

German circus performer

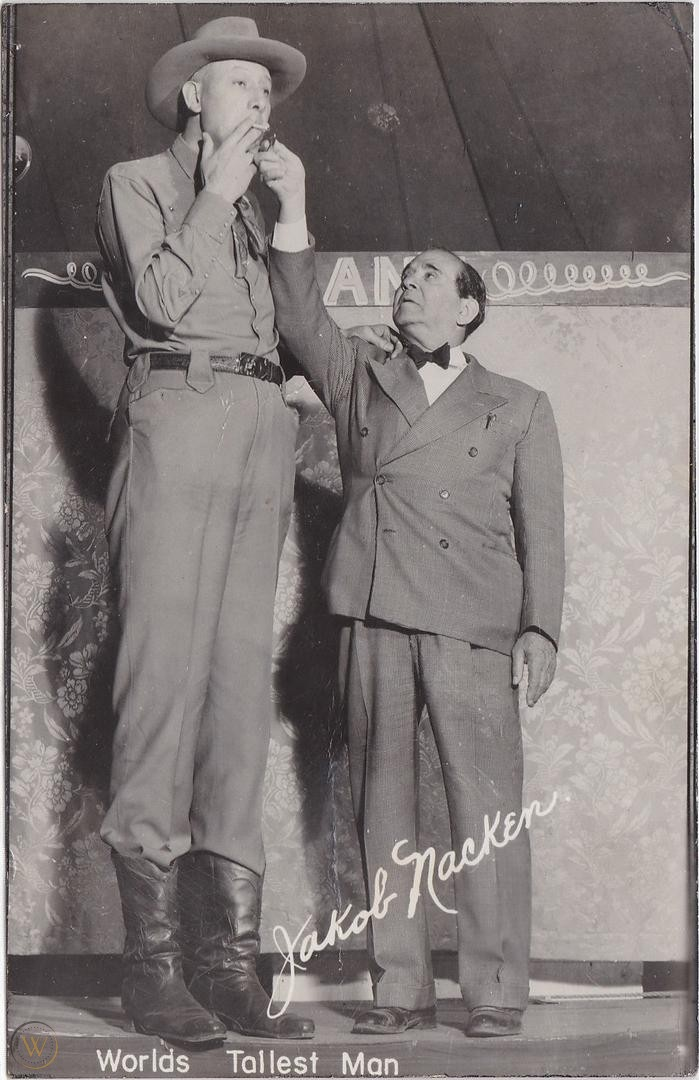
- Ripley's Odditorium 1935
- Born: 15 February 1906; Düsseldorf, Rhenish Prussia, Germany
- Died: 29 March 1987 (aged 81); Europe
- Other names: "Uranus"; World's Tallest Man; Giant from Rhineland
- Occupations: sideshow artist; circus performer
- Height: 7 ft 3 in (221 cm)
- Spouse: Maria
- Military career
- Allegiance: Nazi Germany (to 1945)
- Branch: Wehrmacht
- Service years: 1939–1945
- Conflicts: World War II

Jakob Hudson Nacken or Jacob Nacken (15 February 1906 – 29 March 1987) was a German circus performer active in Europe and the United States. He began his career as an exceptionally tall person while a teenager, performing in a traveling circus, and appeared in the 1939 New York World's Fair. Nacken was the tallest soldier in the German Army during World War II at a height of seven feet three inches (2.21 m). He was employed as a giant Santa Claus and appeared on American television as a figure of high stature and in freak shows as the World's Tallest Man.

== Early life ==
Nacken was born in Düsseldorf, Germany, on 15 February 1906. Both his parents were six feet (1.8 m). His sister Josephine was six feet two inches (1.88 m) tall; his two-years-younger brother Wilhelm grew to be six feet four inches (1.93 m) tall; his other brother, who was eight years older than Nacken, became six feet seven inches (2.01 m).

== Mid-life and career ==
Nacken began his career in show business performing as "Uranus" and the "giant from the Rhineland" in a German traveling circus. He was called Germany's tallest man and was credited as being the world's tallest man at the time. Nacken wore size 17 boots as an adult. He had bruises on his head from hitting the tops of doorways that were built to accommodate people of average height.

He appeared at Luna Park, an amusement park in Paris, in 1922. Nacken was internationally known for his height of seven feet three inches (2.21 m) and earned an engagement at the 1939 New York World's Fair.

He returned to Germany at the beginning of World War II and was immediately drafted into the army, becoming their tallest soldier on record. Nacken was put into a gun crew with 250 soldiers who were captured at Calais, France, in August 1944. Nacken and his men were taken to England as prisoners of war and remained there until the end of the war.

In August 1949, newspapers announced Nacken was to return to the United States because he wanted to leave post-war Germany. Nacken's sister, who already lived in the United States, prepared a place for him and his wife to live in Paterson, New Jersey. Nacken and his wife emigrated to the United States on the SS Atlantic from Genoa, Italy, arriving in the port of New York City on 6 December 1950.

Nacken sought work that would suit his stature. Through newspaper pictures and Pathé newsreels, he was well-known. During December 1949, he worked as Santa Claus. Children were able to walk between his legs and he was dubbed the world's tallest Santa. Nacken worked in Ripley's Believe It or Not! shows as the "World's Tallest Man". He appeared on several television shows as a celebrity known as "Germany's Long Jake".

== Personal life ==
On 10 August 1927, Nacken married Maria from Kematen an der Ybbs, Austria, in Brussels, Belgium. She stood five feet eight inches (1.73 m) tall. They had no children.

He became a citizen of the United States on 16 December 1955.

== Later life and death ==
Nacken's last appearance as "World's Tallest Man" was in 1959 at Ripley's Odditorium on Broadway in Manhattan, New York City. He died in Europe at age 81.

== Gallery ==
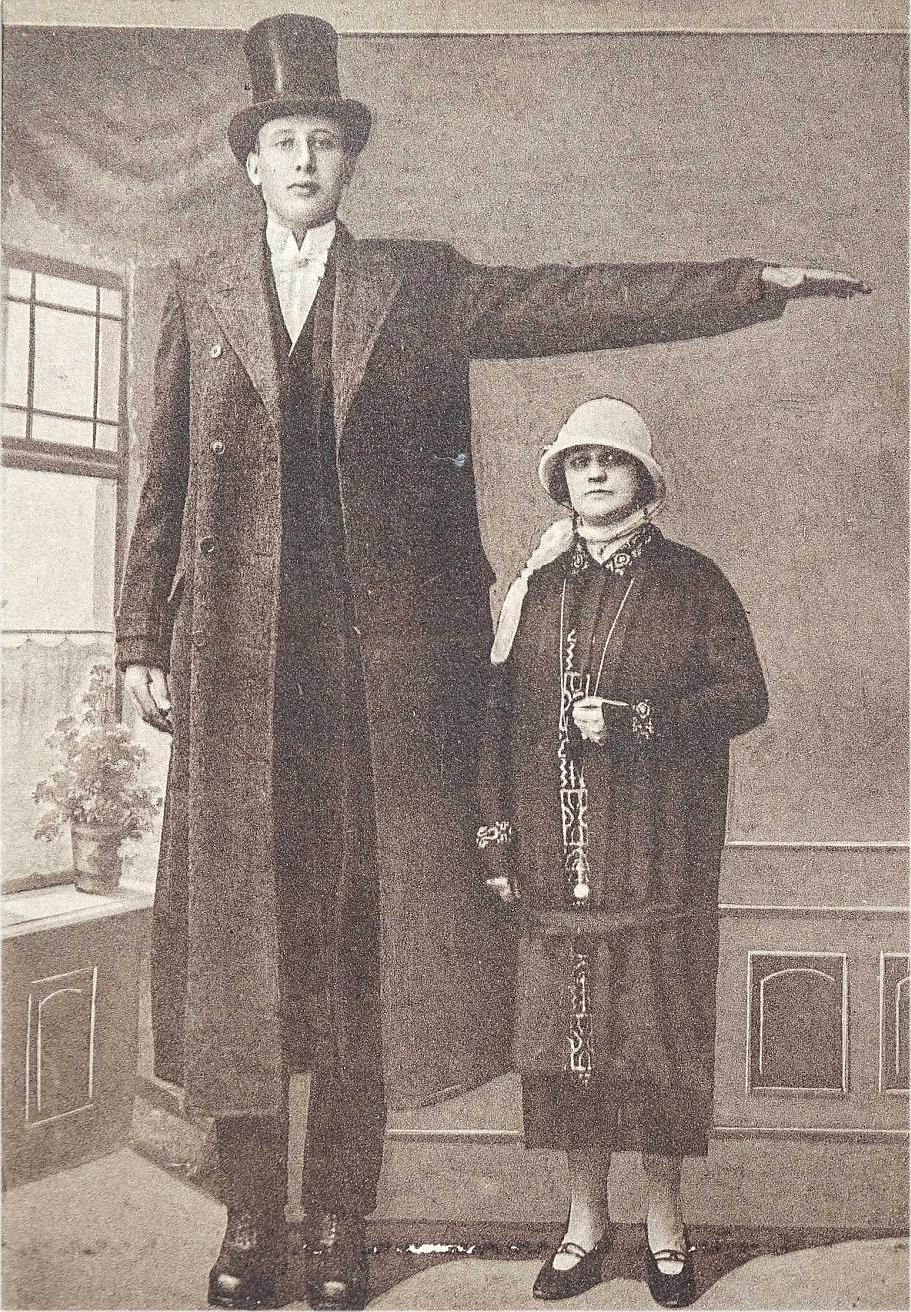
Jakob Nacken at age 16 in 1922

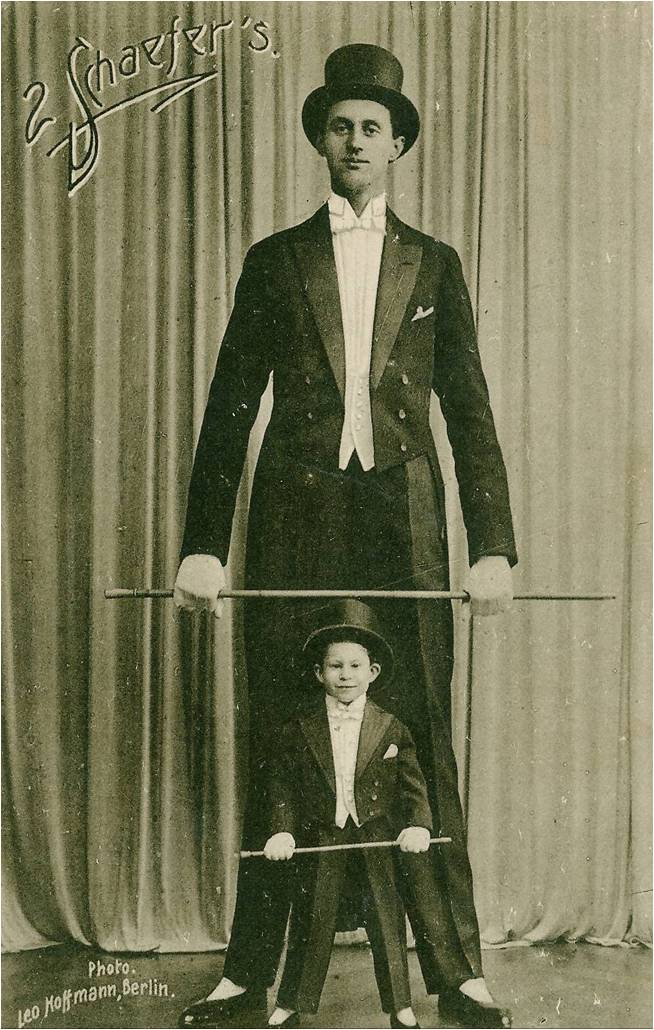
Nacken at age 17 as a circus acrobat with a young boy assistant

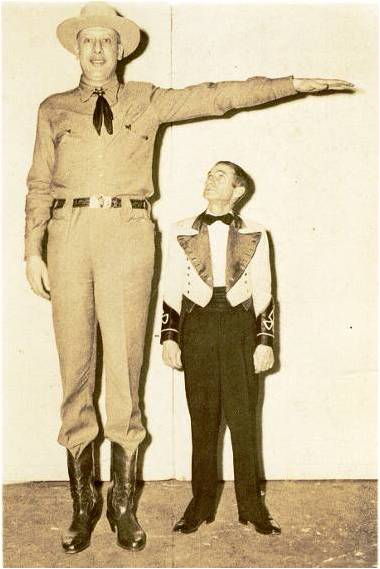
Nacken in 1924 at age 18

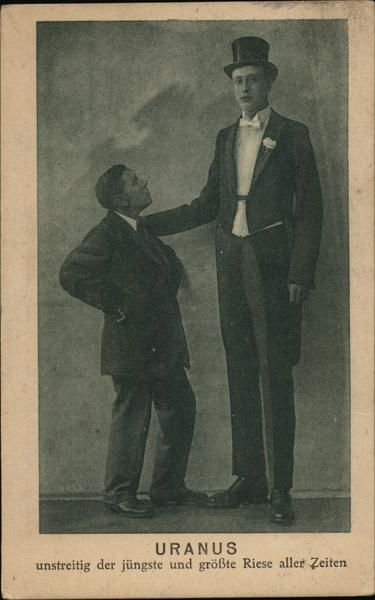
Nacken in a German circus as "Uranus" at age 19

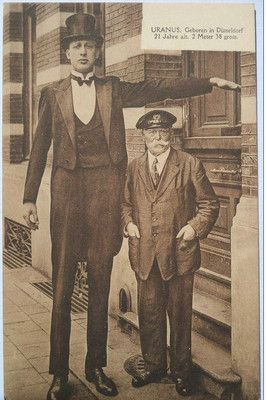
Nacken 21 years old Paris

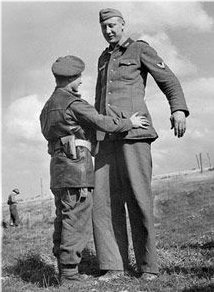
Nacken captured at Calais, France in 1944 when he was 38 years old

== See also ==
- Ella Ewing
- List of tallest people
- Robert Wadlow
