= Will Jacobsen =

American basketball player (born 1988)

Personal information
- Born: March 7, 1988 (age 38) Bonney Lake, Washington, U.S.
- Listed height: 7 ft 5 in (2.26 m)
- Listed weight: 260 lb (118 kg)

Career information
- High school: White River (Buckley, Washington)
- College: Gonzaga (2006–2010)
- NBA draft: 2010: undrafted
- Position: Center

Career history
- 2010–2011: Clube de Basquetebol de Penafiel
- 2011–2012: Idaho Stampede
- 2012: Leones de Santo Domingo
- 2012: Rio Grande Valley Vipers
- 2012: Springfield Armor
- 2011–2013: Sioux Falls Skyforce
- 2013: Maine Celtics
- 2014–2015: Tokyo Cinq Reves

William Jacobsen (born March 7, 1988) is an American former basketball player who at 7 ft 5 in (2.26 m) was among the tallest players in the history of NCAA Division I men's basketball while playing center for the Gonzaga Bulldogs and later professionally for several NBA D and G League teams.

Jacobsen was born on March 7, 1988, in Bonney Lake, Washington, as Will Foster and grew up in Enumclaw, Washington, before moving to Buckley, Washington. He graduated from White River High School in 2006 where he started slow on the basketball team but became a notable player by his senior year, and top college teams tried to recruit him. Jacobsen attended Gonzaga University in Spokane, Washington, where he played for the Bulldogs while earning a bachelor of arts degree in sports management from 2006 to 2010. He played professionally for five NBA minor league teams as well as in Portugal, the Dominican Republic, and Japan.

Jacobsen has a 7 ft 7 in (2.31 m) arm span.

== See also ==
- List of tallest people
