= Jinnat Ali =

Tallest Bangladeshi (1996–2020)

- জিন্নাত আলী
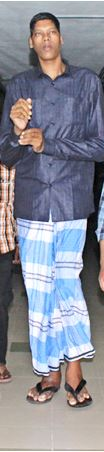
- Born: 1996; Ramu Upazila, Cox's Bazar, Bangladesh
- Died: 28 April 2020 (aged 23–24); Chittagong Medical College Hospital, Chittagong, Bangladesh
- Known for: One of the tallest men
- Height: 2.31 m (7 ft 6.94 in)

Jinnat Ali (1996 – 28 April 2020) was a Bangladeshi citizen, and the tallest person from Bangladesh.

== Biography ==
Jinnat Ali was born in 1996 in Barabili, in the village of Gorjania union under Ramu Upazila of Cox's Bazar, Bangladesh, to farmer Amir Hamza and Shahampura Begum. Ali was the second of the three sons of his parents. He lived with his parents, a sister, and two brothers. Family sources stated Ali's body suddenly started to grow abnormally in childhood. His body continued to grow at the age of 23. Ali's height was predicted to keep increasing, and therefore he had to eat at least a kilogram of food every day to keep a sufficient muscle mass and healthy weight. According to Md Farid Uddin, the doctor of BSMMU, Ali suffered from acromegalic gigantism — a condition caused by a tumor on his pituitary gland which caused his body to produce too much growth hormone.

== Personal life ==
Ali's height was increasing unnaturally due to a hormonal imbalance, and medical treatments were unable to solve the ongoing condition and its complications. In 2018, physicians treating Ali informed him he was suffering from a brain tumor when Ali was admitted at Bangabandhu Sheikh Mujib Medical University (BSMMU) in 2018. Subsequently, Bangladesh Prime Minister Sheikh Hasina gifted Ali and his family a house to make Ali's life and the life of his family more comfortable under the circumstances, after Ali met with the Prime Minister in 2018.

== Treatment and death ==
Ali underwent treatment for his hormonal imbalance at Bangabandhu Sheikh Mujib Medical University in Dhaka. However, Jinnat Ali died April 28, 2020, while on life support in the neurosurgery department of Chittagong Medical College Hospital due to a brain tumor and other complications.
