= Joelison Fernandes da Silva =

Brazilian volleyball player

Joelison Fernandes da Silva (born 15 August 1985) is a Brazilian Sitting volleyball player and he has been recognized as the tallest man in Brazil, measuring 2.37 meters tall and weighing 169 kilograms.

In 2014, he competed and won one Mixed martial arts event.

In 2015, he married Evem Medeiros, who at 5'0" is nearly 3 feet shorter than him.

In 2017, he discovered osteomyelitis in the bone of one of his legs, and the only alternative to solve the problem was the amputation of the leg in 2021.
