= Zhao Liang (circus performer) =

Chinese circus performer

- Born: 1982 (age 43–44); Henan, China
- Occupation: Circus performer
- Known for: Tallest living human being
- Height: 2.46 m (8 ft 1 in)
- Parent: Wang Keyun

Zhao Liang is a circus performer from Henan in China. In April 2009, doctors in Tianjin measured his height at 2.46 m (8 ft 1 in). If confirmed, this would make him the second tallest living person after Sultan Kösen, but taller than previous record holder Bao Xishun who has been measured by the Guinness World Records as 2.36 m (7 ft 9 in). Leonid Stadnyk, reported to be 2.57 m (8 ft 5 in) tall, briefly held the title, but was disqualified due to his refusal to be measured.

Zhao played basketball until he sustained ligament damage to his left foot in 2001. His 2009 hospital trip was related to this injury as he was too poor to have it treated sooner. He suffers from gigantism. Despite advising Zhao Liang against any intense physical exercise, Zhao's surgeon has declared that he has no health issues related to his height. His parents and siblings are average height. He was unemployed until 2006, when he joined a circus in Jilin province. Though recruited for his height, he now also does magic tricks and plays the saxophone and cucurbit flute.

== See also ==
- List of tallest people
