= Cornelius Magrath =

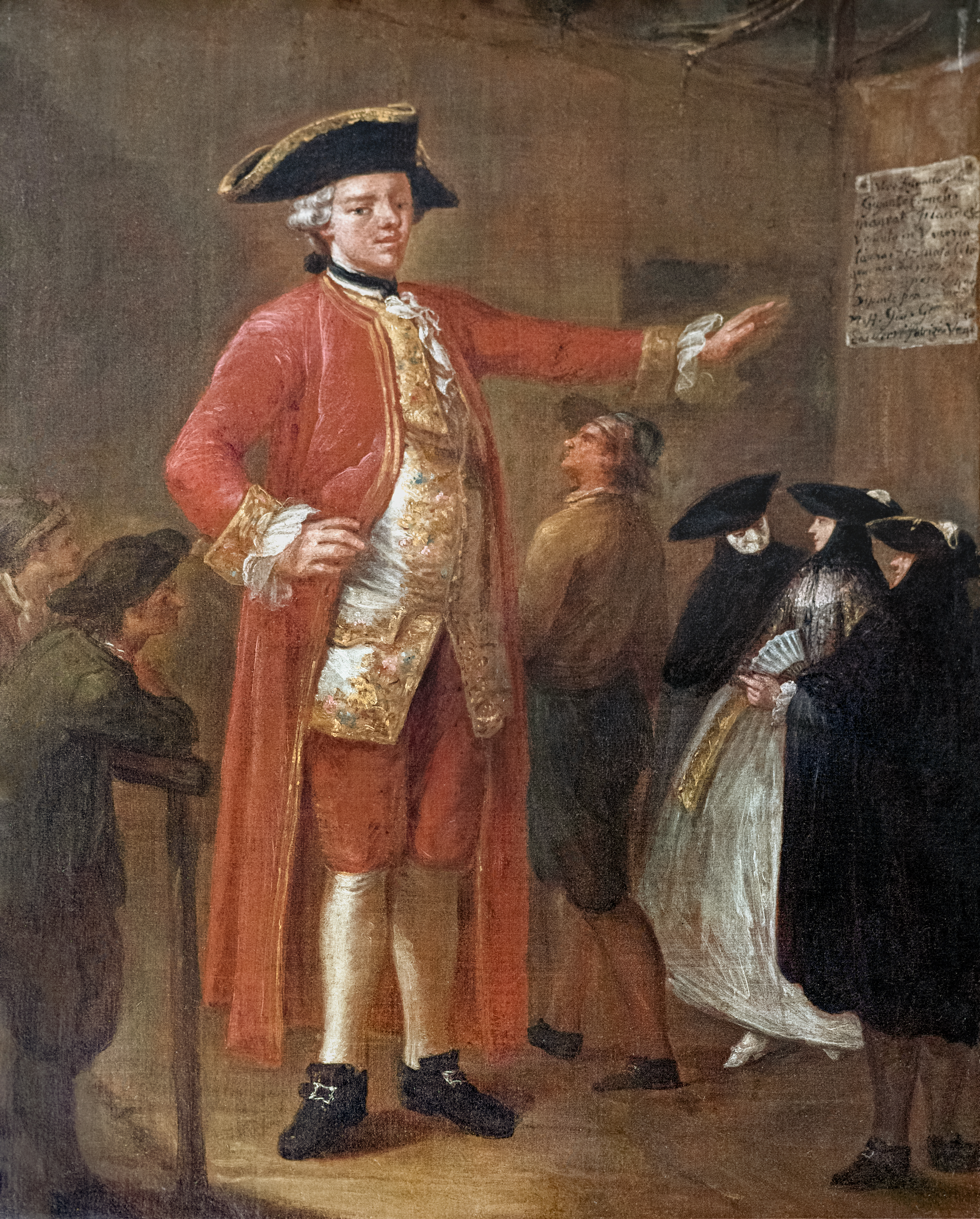
The giant Magrath by Pietro Longhi in Ca' Rezzonico Venice

Cornelius Magrath (1736–1760) was an Irish giant born in County Tipperary. In 1752 he came to Cork for salt water treatments to alleviate the pain of his rapid growth. While there, many persuaded him to exhibit himself for pay.

In January 1753 he was already a huge star in London as the press noted: "Just arrived in this city, from Ireland, the youth, mentioned lately in the newspapers, as the most extraordinary production in nature. He is allowed by the nobility and gentry, who daily resort to see him, to have the most stupendous and gigantic form (altho' a boy), and is the only representation in the world of the ancient and magnificent giants of that kingdom. He is seven feet three inches in height, without shoes. His wrist measures a quarter of a yard and an inch. He greatly surpasses Cajanus the Swede, in the just proportions of his limbs; and is the truest and best proportioned figure ever seen. He was sixteen years of age the 10th of last March and is to be seen at the Peacock, at Charing Cross, from eight in the morning, till ten at night."

After touring England the young Magrath did short stints throughout all of Europe, but in Flanders he was forced to return to his native Ireland as his health rapidly began to decline. He died soon after, and although he had made friends with students from nearby Trinity College, they stole his body the very same day he died.

After dissection, his bones were preserved, where they still remain on display at Trinity College. They were described by Sir George Humphry in his book A treatise on the human skeleton: (including the joints). Physician D.J. Cunningham commented that the skeleton also exhibited marked signs of acromegaly.

Other notable giants whose bodies were stolen and later preserved were Charles Byrne and Daniel Mynheer Cajanus.
