= Parimal Barman =

Tallest person in the world in 1991 at 2.51 meters tall

- Born: 1962; East Pakistan
- Died: 1991 (aged 28–29)
- Known for: Tallest Bangladeshi
- Height: 251 cm (8 ft 3 in)

Parimal Chandra Barman (1962–1991) from Bangladesh was considered the tallest person in the world in 1991 at 2.51 m (8 ft 3 in).

Parimal had a tumor on his pituitary gland causing his incredible growth spurt. He was also suffering from malnutrition during his later life. He had been undergoing treatment for Gigantism at St. Bartholomew's Hospital in London. He was being considered for measurement by Guinness for the Guinness World Record for the tallest living person at the time of his death in 1991.

== See also ==
- List of tallest people

Preceded by Suleiman Ali Nashnush	Tallest Recognized Person; 1990 – 1991	Succeeded by Alam Channa
