= Pornchai Saosri =

Tallest man from Thailand

- Born: 1989
- Died: November 8, 2015 (aged 25–26)
- Known for: Tallest recorded Thai, 8th Tallest Recorded Human
- Height: 8 ft 5.2 in (257 cm)

Pornchai Saosri (RTGS: Phonchai Saosi; 1989 – November 8, 2015) was a Thai man who claimed to be 8 ft 9.9 in (269 cm) but this is not verified by Guinness World Records. He was last measured to be around 8 feet 5.2 inches.

== Biography ==
Pornchai Saosri made his first appearance in the public news when in 2009 he measured 7 ft 6 in (228 cm). He next appeared in 2012 when he measured 7 ft 6.6 in (230 cm). His next news recorded appearance was in 2013 when he grew to 8 ft 5.2 in (257 cm) which he measured for his ID card renewal. Although his claim wasn't recognized by Guinness World Records, this would make him taller than the official record holder Sultan Kösen by 2.2 inches (5.5 cm) and the tallest living human at the time. He died in 2015 aged 26 of hypertension. By that point, he claimed (unverified) to be 8 ft 9.9 in (269 cm), weighing 225 kg (496 lb).

Despite the inflation of his height figure and the lack of information during his life, he is likely the 8th tallest person in recorded history.
