= Primordial dwarfism =

Form of dwarfism that results in a smaller body size in all stages of life

- Specialty: Medical genetics

Primordial dwarfism (PD) is a form of dwarfism that results in a smaller body size in all stages of life beginning from before birth. More specifically, primordial dwarfism is a diagnostic category including specific types of profoundly proportionate dwarfism, in which individuals are extremely small for their age, even as a fetus. Most individuals with primordial dwarfism are not diagnosed until they are about 3–5 years of age.

Medical professionals typically diagnose the fetus as being small for gestational age, or as showing intrauterine growth restriction when an ultrasound is conducted. Typically, people with primordial dwarfism are born with very low birth weights. After birth, growth continues at a much slower rate, leaving individuals with primordial dwarfism perpetually years behind their peers in stature and in weight.

Most cases of short stature are caused by skeletal or endocrine disorders. The five subtypes of primordial dwarfism are among the most severe forms of the 200 types of dwarfism.

There are as yet no effective treatments for primordial dwarfism. It is rare for individuals affected by primordial dwarfism to live past the age of 30. In the case of microcephalic osteodysplastic primordial dwarfism type II (MOPDII), there can be increased risk of vascular problems, which may cause premature death.

== Causes ==
It is known that PD is caused by inheriting a mutant gene from each parent, or from a mutation in the fetus. The lack of normal growth in the disorder is not due to a deficiency of growth hormone, as in hypopituitary dwarfism. Administering growth hormone, therefore, has little or no effect on the growth of the individual with primordial dwarfism, except in the case of Russell–Silver syndrome (RSS). Individuals with RSS respond favorably to growth hormone treatment. Children with RSS that are treated with growth hormone before puberty may achieve several inches of additional height. In January 2008, it was published that mutations in the pericentrin gene (PCNT) were found to cause primordial dwarfism. Pericentrin has a role in cell division, proper chromosome segregation and cytokinesis.

Another gene that has been implicated in this condition is DNA2. Mutations in this gene have been implicated in Seckel syndrome.

== Diagnosis ==
Since primordial dwarfism disorders are extremely rare, misdiagnosis is common. Because children with PD do not grow like other children, poor nutrition, a metabolic disorder, or a digestive disorder may be diagnosed initially. The correct diagnosis of PD may not be made until the child is 5 years old and it becomes apparent that the child has severe dwarfism.

=== Types ===
Name	OMIM	Description
Seckel syndrome	210600	People with Seckel syndrome are noted to have microcephaly. Many also suffer from scoliosis, hip dislocation, delayed bone age, radial head dislocation, and seizures. Mutations in patients with Seckel syndrome have recently been identified in the gene encoding centrosomal protein CEP152 which is also mutated in some cases of primary isolated microcephaly.
Microcephalic osteodysplastic primordial dwarfism type I (MODPD1) (Taybi–Linder syndrome)	210710	This form of primordial dwarfism is often shortened to ODPDI. The corpus callosum of the brain is often undeveloped (called agenesis of the corpus callosum) and patients are known to have seizures and apnea. Hair thinness is also common, including scalp, hair, eyelashes and eyebrows. They suffer skeletally from short vertebrae, elongated clavicles, bent femora and hip displacement. Like those with Seckel syndrome, they also often have microcephaly. This syndrome is due to mutations in the RNU4ATAC gene. This gene, located on the long arm of chromosome 2 (2q14), encodes a small nuclear RNA component of the U12 dependent spliceosome.
Microcephalic osteodysplastic primordial dwarfism type II (MODPD2)	210720	Those who have ODPDII often have additional medical problems as compared with the other types, such as a squeaky voice, microdontia, widely spaced primary teeth, poor sleep patterns (in early years), delayed mental development, frequent sickness, breathing problems, eating problems, hyperactivity, farsightedness, and brain aneurysm. They do not respond to hormone therapy because primordial dwarfism is not caused by a lack of any growth hormone. After reviewing X-rays, it is also found that many have dislocated joints, scoliosis and delayed bone age as well as microcephaly. They will not reach the size of an average newborn until they are between the ages of 3 and 5. This condition is due to mutations in the PCNT gene located on the long arm of chromosome 21 (21q22). It encodes a protein known as pericentrin.
Silver–Russell dwarfism (Russell-Silver Syndrome)	180860	The final height of those with Russell–Silver syndrome often exceeds the height of others with primordial dwarfism, and they tend to have dysmorphic features. Some phenotypes (characteristics) of people who have Russell–Silver syndrome are inadequate catch-up growth in first 2 years, body asymmetry, lack of appetite, low-set posteriorly rotated ears, clinodactyly (inward curving) of the 5th finger, webbed toes, non-descended testicles, weak muscle tone, delayed bone age, downturned corners of mouth and thin upper lip, hypospadias, high pitched voice, small chin, delayed closure of the fontanel, hypoglycemia, and a bossed forehead. Their heads may appear to be triangular shaped and large for their small body size.
Meier–Gorlin syndrome	224690	Individuals with Meier-Gorlin syndrome often have small ears and no kneecaps. They are also found to have curved clavicles, narrow ribs, and elbow dislocation. Like Russell–Silver syndrome, they usually exceed the height of those with Seckel syndrome and ODPDI and II. It is also known as "ear, patella, short stature syndrome" (EPS). Mutations in patients with Meier-Gorlin syndrome have recently been identified in a series of genes involved in chromosomal replication, specifically in the pre-replication complex. Specific genes include origin recognition complex genes ORC1, ORC4 and ORC6, as well as other replication genes CDT1 and CDC6.

== Notable cases ==
- Jyoti Amge - Indian actress, world's shortest woman since her 18th birthday on 16 December 2011
- Caroline Crachami – known as the "Sicilian Fairy", she was the first person recognized to have primordial dwarfism. Her remains were displayed in the Hunterian Museum in Scotland
- Chandra Bahadur Dangi – smallest man of all time
- Nelson de la Rosa – Dominican actor/television personality who frequently appeared at 2004 Boston Red Sox playoff games
- Aditya Dev – world's smallest bodybuilder
- Bridgette Jordan and Brad Jordan – siblings
- Khagendra Thapa Magar – world's shortest man from his 18th birthday on 14 October 2010 to 13 June 2011
- Gul Mohammed – former smallest man of all time
- He Pingping – world's shortest ambulatory man until his death in 2010
- Weng Weng – Filipino actor and martial artist
- Lucía Zárate – Mexican entertainer and first person identified to have MOPD II
- Kenadie Jourdin-Bromley – nicknamed Thumbelina, she has been featured in several movies and documentaries, including Eep!, Incredibly Small, and Born Different.
- Sienna Bernal – world's rarest discordant twinning
- Afshin Esmaeil Ghaderzadeh - Iranian Kurdish internet celebrity, the current Guinness World Records holder of shortest living man since December 2022.
- Köksal Bektaşoğlu - known by his alias Köksal Baba, Turkish internet celebrity and former boxer

== See also ==
- Gigantism
- Dwarfism
- Psychogenic dwarfism
- List of people with dwarfism
