= Glover Crane Arnold =

American physician and instructor (1849–1906)

Grover Crane Arnold
- Born: September 7, 1849; Charleston, South Carolina, U.S.
- Died: November 29, 1906 (aged 57); Manhattan, New York, U.S.
- Education: Columbia University; Bellevue Medical College
- Medical career
- Profession: Surgeon; Prosector; Professor; General Practitioner
- Field: anatomy, surgery
- Institutions: City Hospital; New York University; Bellevue Hospital Medical College; Mills Training School for Nurses
- Awards: Glover C. Arnold Surgical Award

Glover Crane Arnold (September 7, 1849 – November 29, 1906) was an American medical doctor, surgeon, and instructor of anatomy and surgery at Bellevue Hospital Medical College and New York University's Medical College. He was also a faculty member of the Mills Training School for Male Nurses at Bellevue Hospital.

Arnold was involved in testing cures for malaria and tuberculosis. The Boston Medical and Surgical Journal (now The New England Journal of Medicine) described Arnold as "a successful and highly esteemed practitioner."

Annually, the New York University Grossman School of Medicine presents the Glover C. Arnold Surgical Award to a graduating medical student who is top in general surgery.

== Early life ==
Arnold was born in Charleston, South Carolina. He was the son of Mary Selena and Cicero M. Arnold. His father owned Townsend, Arnold & Co., a dry goods business based in New York City with facilities in Charleston, South Carolina and a range as far south as Mississippi prior to the Civil War. His grandfather was Dr. John William Schmidt, a prominent doctor in Charleston, South Carolina, who moved to New York City. His uncle, Dr. John William Schmidt Jr. also practiced medicine in New York City.

Arnold's immediate family moved to New York City in 1859. He enrolled in Columbia University in 1869. While at Columbia, he joined the Fraternity of Delta Psi (St. Anthony Hall) and the American Microscopical Society. He left Columbia after two years and enrolled in Bellevue Hospital Medical College, graduating in February 1873. Arnold was an intern in the 3rd Surgical Division at Bellevue Hospital from 1872 through October 1874.

== Career ==
Arnold became a medical doctor in 1874, and practiced general medicine from offices at 115 East 30th Street in New York City. He also practiced at City Hospital and was the attending physician for the Maternity Society. He also continued as a house surgeon at Bellevue Hospital.

From 1875 to 1877, he was a clinical assistant in surgery and the prosector to the chair of surgery at the University of the City of New York (now New York University). In June 1875, Arnold testified in a child murder trial; he had treated the injured child at the hospital. In 1877, Arnold published an article, "Successful Tracheotomy for Diphtheria," in The Medical Gazette.

In 1879, Arnold made national news when he was one of seven doctors allowed to examine Frank Uffner's Midgets—Lucia Zaráte and General Mite—who would go on to be famous circus sideshow acts. In 1884 in The New York Medical Journal, Dr. Ghislani Durant wrote of his successful treatment for malaria when quinine and arsenic had failed. He mentions that, although he originated the phenic acid cure, Arnold has successfully used this treatment since 1876 or 1877.

In 1886, Arnold became a professor and prosector for the chair of anatomy at the Bellevue Hospital Medical College. By 1892, he was an instructor at the Mills Training School for Male Nurses at Bellevue Hospital. He was one of four faculty members who established the course of instruction and presented lectures and practical demonstrations He also served on the three-person Committee on Examination of Nurses.

In 1891, Arnold made the news as the attending physician of Walter Hale, a visitor to New York City from Massachusetts who had no memory of roaming the city for three days after receiving a head injury. Arnold's diagnosis was that Hale had a concussion as a result of the injury.

In special newspaper coverage of his promising cure for tuberculosis in 1896, Dr. Cyrus Edson, former Commissioner of the New York Health Department, mentions that Arnold had found a solution to the small nodule that forms at the cure's injections site, indicating that Arnold is one of the "score of the best-known physicians in and about New York" who tested and experimented with the new drug.

Arnold retired from medicine in 1902 for health reasons.

== Professional affiliations ==
Professional recognition came early for Arnold; in May 1879, the New York Academy of Medicine elected Arnold for a residence fellowship. In addition to the New York Academy of Medicine, he was also a member of the Medical Society County of New York and was a board member and secretary of the New York State Medical Association. In April 1906, Arnold became a Fellow in the Medical Association of the Greater City of New York.

== Honors ==
At their annual meeting in January 1907, the Medical Association of the Greater City of New York passed a resolution "to record its appreciation of the high attainment and admirable character of Dr. Arnold..."

Arnold's family established the Glover C. Arnold Surgical Prize at Bellevue Hospital Medical College in 1909. The senior medical student with the best scores on the surgery exams received the prize. The first recipients of the prize received $100; Mrs. Arnold gave $2,000 to endow the Glover C. Arnold Surgical Prize Fund—a gift of more than $62,000 in 2022 money. Because Bellevue Hospital Medical College merged with New York University, the New York University Grossman School of Medicine now gives the Glover C. Arnold Surgical Award to the graduating medical student who is top in general surgery.

== Publications ==
- Arnold, Glover C. (1877). "Successful Tracheotomy for Diphtheria". The Medical Gazette. 1 (9): 329–332
- — "Memoir of Lewis Hall Saye, M.D." (1890).Transactions of the New York State Medical Association. 7: 494–495

== Personal ==
In 1878, Arnold went to court in a foreclosure suit against former Congressman Joseph Egbert. During the case, Arnold's attorney noted that Egbert was "a fraud". Arnold was successful in his case.

In 1879, Arnold married Emily Spier, daughter of New York Supreme Court Justice Gilbert M. Spier. They had three daughters: Emily J. Arnold, Mary Selena Arnold, and Louise Arnold. Another daughter, Ursula Dumont Arnold, died in 1887 when she was less than ten–months old. The family moved to 114 East 65th Street, Manhattan in December 1900. This move may have been motivated by the pending debut of the oldest daughter Emily, which was held at their new residence a month later, followed by the debuts of the younger two daughters.

His brother, Dr. William Arnold, was a professor of physiology at the University of the City of New York (now New York University). Another brother, Robert Townsend Arnold, was an affluent coffee broker who scandalously committed suicide at his home in Summit, New Jersey in 1888, because of temporary insanity caused by neuralgia.

Arnold was a member of the St. Anthony Club of New York and the United Confederate Veterans. He was an active Mason, serving as Master of the Holland Lodge. He also served on the board of the Alumni Association of Bellevue Hospital Medical College. He was a member of the vestry of the Church of the Transfiguration in Manhattan, New York.

He died on November 29, 1906, at his home in Manhattan at the age of 57 of Bright's disease. He was buried at Green-Wood Cemetery in Brooklyn with Masonic rites.
