= Madge Bester =

World's shortest living woman (1963–2018)

Madge Bester (26 April 1963 – 19 March 2018) was a former world's shortest living woman. From South Africa, in 1991 she measured 65 cm (2 ft 1.5 inches) in height. Bester had osteogenesis imperfecta, which is characterized by brittle bones, and used a wheelchair.

She was a campaigner for disability rights, holding a 1998 press conference on the issue accompanied by Lin Yih-Chih, the former world's smallest man.

Bester lived in a retirement village in Bloemfontein. Her mother Winnie, who died in 2001, also had osteogenesis imperfecta and measured only 70 cm.

Bester died on 19 March 2018, aged 54.

== See also ==
- List of the verified shortest people

Records
| Preceded by Bridgette Jordan | Shortest Recognized Woman ?–2011 | Succeeded by Jyoti Amge |
