= Naseer Soomro =

Pakistani giant (c.1970 – 2025)

- Born: 1969 or 1970; Shikarpur District, Sindh, Pakistan
- Died: 17 March 2025 (aged 55); Shikarpur, Sindh, Pakistan
- Occupation: PIA employee in Customer Services Department
- Height: 2.36 m (7 ft 9 in)

Naseer Ahmad Soomro (Urdu: نصیر احمد سومرو; 1969 or 1970 – 17 March 2025), was at one point the tallest living Pakistani, standing at 238 cm (7 ft 9 in). After Zia Rasheed with a height of eight feet, Soomro was considered to be the second tallest man in the country until the former's death in 2024.

== Biography ==
Naseer Soomro belonged to Shikarpur District of Sindh, province of Pakistan. He worked as the Senior Passenger Handling Services Officer in the Customer Services department of the Pakistan International Airlines (PIA) as the national flag carrier.

In December 1999, he arrived in Taichung, Taiwan, spending four months in the Guinness Book of World Records Museum as a sporting ambassador. He also went to the capital city Taipei where he met Lin Yü-chih, who is among the shortest living men in the world. In 2019, he was a victim of a death hoax. He suffered from chronic lung disease.

At the age of around 55, Soomro died due to lung disease on 17 March 2025 in Shikarpur.

== See also ==
- Alam Channa
- List of tallest people
