= Pauline Musters =

Shortest woman in history

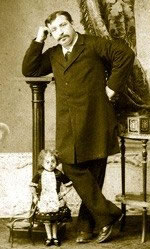
- Musters next to an average man
- Born: February 26, 1878; Ossendrecht, The Netherlands
- Died: March 1, 1895 (aged 17); New York City, United States
- Other name: Princess Pauline
- Known for: Shortest verified female ever
- Height: 24 in (61 cm)

Pauline Musters (February 26, 1878 – March 1, 1895) was a Dutch woman. She is recognized by the Guinness World Records as the shortest woman ever recorded, standing at only 24 inches (61 cm) tall.

== Life ==
Musters was born in 1878 in Ossendrecht in North Brabant province, The Netherlands. She was the seventh child of carpenter Michiel Musters (1843–1889) and Anna Maria Couwenbergh. She had five sisters and three brothers. At birth she measured 11.8 in (30 cm). At age nine she was 1 ft 9.5 in (54.61 cm) and weighed 4 lb 5 oz.

When she was two years old, her father began showing her at fun fairs, and she toured since childhood. Pauline's celebrity meant unexpected wealth for her family: impresario Émile Grandsart offered her father the fourfold annual salary to let her appear in Grandsart's travelling theatre. Michiel Musters could buy several plots of land and on the facade of the house he built on Ossendrecht village street there were the words "Maison Princesse Pauline" written in golden letters.

After her father's death in 1889, Pauline toured with her Belgian brother-in-law Joseph "Sjef" Verschueren, her sister Cornelia's husband. First they travelled the Netherlands and Belgium, followed by Germany, France, and England (visiting Berlin, Paris, Bordeaux, London, and Liverpool, among others). At first, she was only put on display; later on she would perform in theatres, in the circus, or freak shows as a "living doll", thereby dancing, performing acrobatic acts, singing, and interacting with the audience. She drew up to 800 spectators. Soon she exclusively used the stage name "Princess Pauline". She would wear elegant fancy dresses that were tailored to measure. She spoke Flemish Dutch, French, German, and a little English.

She was received, among others, by Queen Emma of the Netherlands and Emperor Wilhelm II of Germany.

In 1894, she was invited to the United States by an impresario. She made her debut on December 31, 1894, in Proctor's Theatre on Broadway, New York City, with whom Verschueren had concluded a contract for two years. She was very well received, and photographs of her were published in many newspapers. Every day she conducted three performances. To attract media attention, Verschueren had promised a reward of 12,000 Guilders to any person of at least 17 years of age who was smaller than Musters.

Pauline Musters was soon well liked in New York for her beauty and gracefulness; she was described as polite, calm, and gentle.

Two months after her arrival, Musters died in her hotel room from pneumonia and meningitis (by other sources from a cold and an illness of the chest), aggravated by use of alcohol, a few days after her 17th birthday. When an autopsy was performed on her, a weight of 8 lbs 11.4 oz (3.9 kg) and a size of 2 ft (61 cm) (due to some post mortem elongation) were stated.

Muster's body was first laid out in St Vincent de Paul church. Her family was offered 60,000 Guilders for her body, which they declined. Instead, they had her body embalmed and transferred to Ossendrecht. Pauline was laid in state on the veranda of the family mansion in a threefold coffin made of bronze, glass, and oak wood. In accordance with her stage name she was dressed like a princess in a silk gown, with a crown, diamonds, and gems. Many inhabitants came to pay their last respects. On March 8, 1895, she was laid to rest on the local cemetery.

In Ossendrecht, town hall items from Pauline Muster's life are on display. In 2012, journalist Mark Traa published a novel about her after two years of research. Artist Hans Hermes created a sculpture to her memory in 2018.

== Size ==
Due to her dwarfism, Musters was only 1 ft 9.5 in (54.61 cm) tall and weighed 4 lb 5 oz (1.96 kg) at the age of nine. At a measured size of 1 ft 11.2 in (58,9 cm) she set a record as the shortest adult person. (Mexican Lucía Zárate is said to have been only 1 ft 8 in [51 cm] by some accounts, but has been registered in Guinness World Records with a size of 2 ft 2.8 in [67 cm].) There were also false data of 1 ft 6.9 in (48 cm) and 1 ft 4.5 in (42 cm), probably circulated by Verschueren himself, who exaggerated her age, too. Her weight as an adult varied from 7 lb 7 oz (3.4 kg) to 8 lb 1 oz (4 kg).

Muster's record was officially broken only in 1990 by Gul Mohammed of India (1 ft 10.4 in or 57 cm). In 2012, though, it became known that Chandra Bahadur Dangi of Nepal stood only 1 ft 9.5 in (54.6 cm) tall. Today, Pauline Musters is regarded as the fourth shortest documented person (after Muhammed, Dangi, and Junrey Balawing of the Philippines) and as the shortest documented woman of all times.

Preceded by Lucía Zárate	Shortest Recognized Woman ever 1895–present	Succeeded by None

Preceded by Lucía Zárate	Shortest Recognized adult human ever 1895–1990	Succeeded by Gul Mohammed

== See also ==
- List of the verified shortest people
