= Lin Yü-chih =

Taiwanese author and activist

Lin Yü-chih (林煜智 Lín Yùzhì; born 1972) is an author and social activist, who was one of the shortest people in the world according to Guinness World Records. He resides in Taipei, Taiwan. In May 2008 he appeared in the British Channel 4 documentary called "The World's Smallest Man and Me" hosted by Mark Dolan.

== Disability ==
Lin has osteogenesis imperfecta, a genetic bone disorder that hinders normal growth of bone and bodily height. According to the Guinness Book of World Records he is 67.5 cm (2 ft 2.58 in) tall. He is the founder of the Osteogenesis Imperfecta Association.

== Other claimants ==
Others have also claimed the 'Shortest Man' title. He Pingping, from China, measured 73 cm (2 ft 4.74 in) high and in 2007 was crowned as the world's shortest man who could walk. In 2006, Guinness World Records disallowed an application from a then fourteen-year-old Nepalese boy, Khagendra Thapa Magar, who turned 18 in 2010 and took the title of 'World's Shortest Man' until his death in 2020.

== See also ==
- List of shortest people
- Edward Niño Hernández
