= Short people =

Short people may refer to

- People of short stature
  - People with dwarfism
  - Pygmy peoples
  - List of the verified shortest people
- "Short People", a song by Randy Newman

== See also ==
- Human height
