= Malati Rishidev =

Shortest woman in Nepal (born 1999)

Malati Rishidev is the shortest woman in Nepal. She was born on September 3, 1999. She is 81 cm (2 ft 8 in) tall and her weight is about 13.6 kg (30 pounds). She was born in Biratchowk, Morang district.

== See also ==
- Khagendra Thapa Magar - the former shortest man in world from Nepal. He died in January 2020.
