= Caroline Crachami =

First person recognised to have primordial dwarfism

- Born: c. 1815; Palermo, Sicily
- Died: June 4, 1824; London, England
- Other names: "The Sicilian Fairy" "The Sicilian Dwarf"
- Occupation: Sideshow performer
- Known for: First person recognised to have primordial dwarfism
- Height: 50 cm (20 in) (reported)
- Parent: Louis Emmanuel Vogel (father)

Caroline Crachami (c. 1815 – 4 June 1824) was the first person recognised to have primordial dwarfism. Sometimes cited as the smallest person in recorded history, she was nine years old or less at the time of her death, and it is unlikely that she had finished growing. Crachami was said to have been born in Palermo, Italy, and she was known as the "Sicilian Fairy" or "Sicilian Dwarf." She was only about 50 cm tall at the time of her death; it was claimed that at birth she had weighed only one pound (454 grams) and measured about 8 inches (20 cm) tall.

== Early life ==
Caroline Crachami was born in Palermo, Sicily, around 1815, although the exact date of her birth is uncertain. She was reportedly born weighing about one pound (454 g) and measuring approximately 8 inches (20 cm) in length. By 1824, she stood about 50 centimetres (20 in) tall and became known as the "Sicilian Fairy" or "Sicilian Dwarf". She is retrospectively regarded as the first documented person recognised as having primordial dwarfism.

Contemporary observers described Crachami as well proportioned, of normal intelligence for a child of her reported age, and possessing a good command of spoken English. William Jerdan, editor of the Literary Gazette, measured her feet at 3⅛ inches (7.9 cm) in length, noting that her body appeared proportionate in every respect.

== Exhibition ==
Crachami first came to public notice in April 1824, when she was exhibited in London by Dr. Gilligan, who initially claimed to be her father. She was a great success, attracting many distinguished visitors, and was presented at Court. Observers noted that she appeared of normal intelligence for a child of her supposed years, had a good command of spoken English, and suffered from a bad cough.

== Death ==
Only weeks after arriving in London for exhibition, Crachami developed a persistent cough. She died there on 4 June 1824, at the reported age of nine, apparently from a respiratory illness, probably tuberculosis.

During the following week, a dispute arose over the custody of Crachami's remains. News of her death reached her father, Louis Emmanuel Vogel, a musician at the Theatre Royal, Dublin, through newspaper reports. Vogel travelled from Dublin to London and began legal efforts to recover his daughter's body for burial, hoping to return her to Ireland so that her mother could see her one last time.

According to Vogel, he had previously consulted Gilligan about his daughter's health. Vogel claimed that Gilligan had recommended a journey to a drier climate and had offered to take Crachami to London on the understanding that the cost of the trip would be covered by exhibiting her. Following Crachami's death, Gilligan reportedly attempted to sell her body for anatomical dissection before leaving London with the proceeds of her exhibition. When Vogel reached Gilligan's lodgings, he found Crachami's small bed and the costume she had worn when she was presented at court still in the room.

Despite Vogel's efforts, Crachami's body entered the collections of the Royal College of Surgeons of England and was dissected before he could recover it. Contemporary newspapers reported that when Vogel finally located his daughter's remains, he was overcome with grief. Crachami's skeleton was later displayed in the Hunterian Museum alongside that of Charles Byrne, the "Irish Giant", but has since been removed from public display.

== Doubts over her reported age ==
Studies of Caroline Crachami's skull in the 1950s put her dental age range at only 2 to 7 years old, a finding confirmed in 1998. It was suggested that Caroline was in fact 3 years old at her death, rather than 9, although contemporary reports of her abilities and language suggest an older child, and make this a matter for debate.

== See also ==
- List of the verified shortest people

== Sources ==
- Wood, Gaby. The Smallest Of All Persons Mentioned In The Records Of Littleness. Profile, 1998, ISBN 978-1-86197-088-6
- Richmond Review: The Smallest of All Persons
- Hopkins, Charlotte. “The Ballad of Caroline Crachami: The Sicilian Fairy” (London, 2022)
- Caroline Crachami at Everything2.com
