= List of the verified shortest people =

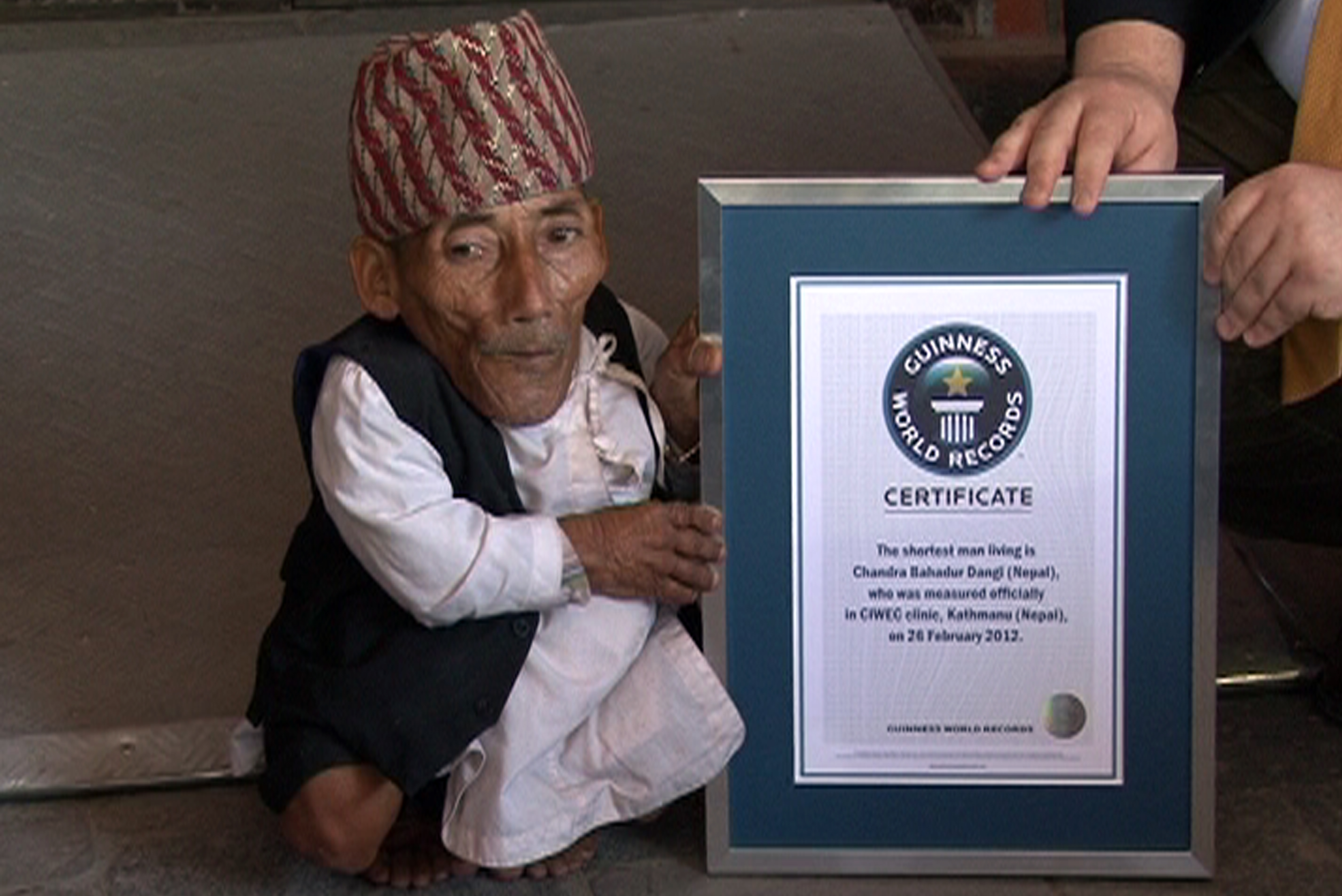
At 54.6 cm (21.5 in), Nepalese-born Chandra Bahadur Dangi was, at the time of his death in 2015, the world's shortest person ever verified.

This list includes the shortest ever verified people in their lifetime or profession. The entries below are broken down into different categories which range from sex, to age group and occupations. Most of the sourcing is done by Guinness World Records which in the last decade has added new categories for "mobile" and "non-mobile" men and women. The world's shortest verified man is Chandra Bahadur Dangi, while for women Pauline Musters holds the record.

== Men ==
Living Deceased

Nationality	Height	Name	Notes	Lifespan
Nepal	54.6 cm (21.5 in)	Chandra Bahadur Dangi	Chandra was declared the shortest human adult ever documented and verified, measuring 21.51 in (54.64 cm). Height confirmed by Guinness World Records.	1939–2015
India	57.0 cm (22.4 in)	Gul Mohammed	Guinness World Records verified Mohammed's height at 22 in (57 cm). He was the shortest man ever verified up to 2012, when he lost the title to Chandra Bahadur Dangi.	1957–1997
Philippines	60.0 cm (23.6 in)	Junrey Balawing	Former shortest living man in the world, measuring 22.0 in (56.0 cm), verified by Guinness World Records in 2012. Balawing became the world's shortest non mobile person following Chandra's death in September, 2015 until his own death in 2020.	1993–2020
Hungary	65 cm (26 in)	István Tóth	Shortest man claimant, was said to be 26 in (65 cm). Verification by Guinness World Records needs to be checked. István died in May 2011 at the age of 48.	1963–2011
Iran	65.24 cm (25.69 in)	Afshin Esmaeil Ghaderzadeh	Ghaderzadeh beat Edward's record and was listed as World's Shortest Man Living (Mobile) by Guinness World Records in December 2022.	2002–
Nepal	67 cm (26 in)	Khagendra Thapa Magar	Khagendra was the shortest man in the world until 2011, when he became the world's shortest mobile man. Guinness World Records has since made multiple categories for World's shortest.... Khagendra died in 2020.	1992–2020
Taiwan	67.5 cm (26.6 in)	Lin Yü-chih	Yü-chih is listed as the World's shortest non-mobile man living, a title he has held non-consecutively since 2009.	1972–
Colombia	70.21 cm (27.64 in)	Edward Niño Hernández	Named the shortest man after Pingping died in March 2010, at 27.64 in (70.21 cm), but lost the title in October 2010 to Magar. Edward re-gained the title of World's shortest mobile man living following Magar's death in 2020. He was beaten by Ghaderzadeh in December 2022.	1986–
Nepal	73.43 cm (28.91 in)	Dor Bahadur Khapangi	Confirmed shortest living teenager (Male) by Guinness World Records.	2004–
China	74 cm (29 in)	He Pingping	Once officially verified as shortest living man (mobile) at 29 in (74 cm), until death in March 2010.	1988–2010

== Women ==
Deceased Living

Nationality	Height	Name	Note	Lifespan
Netherlands	61 cm (24 in)	Pauline Musters	Recognised by the Guinness World Records as the shortest woman ever recorded.	1878–1895
India	62.8 cm (24.7 in)	Jyoti Amge	Recognized by the Guinness World Records as the World's Shortest Living Woman.	1993–
South Africa	65 cm (26 in)	Madge Bester	Former smallest living woman.	1963–2018
Mexico	68 cm (26.8 in)	Lucía Zárate	Zárate claimed in her lifetime that she was only 50.8 cm (20.0 in), and was exhibited for her small stature. This measurement has since been updated by Guinness World Records, who place her height at 68 cm (26.8 in).	1864–1890
United States	69 cm (27 in)	Bridgette Jordan	Former smallest living woman and one of the shortest living siblings according to Guinness World Records.	1989–2019
Turkey	72.6 cm (28.58 in)	Elif Kocaman	Former smallest living woman according to Guinness World Records.	1989–2021

== Shortest pairs ==
Deceased Living

Nationality	Height	Name	Category	Notes	Lifespan
Hungary	76 cm (30 in)	Mike & Ike Matina	Non identical twins	Mike & Ike (born: Bela, and Matyus) Matina are the world's shortest non-identical twins at 30 inches each. They later became American citizens, and had a role in The Wizard of Oz as munchkins. Mike Matina died in 1954. Ike Matina died in 1965.	1901–1954; 1901–1965
United States	86.4 cm (34.0 in)	Rice brothers	Identical twins	World's shortest identical twins (Greg Rice, John Rice) until 2005 with the death of John Rice.	1951–2005; 1951 – (Greg Rice)
Brazil	90.3 cm (35.6 in); 91.1 cm (35.9 in)	Paulo Gabriel Barros & Katyucia Hoshino	Married couple	In 2016, Guinness World Records awarded the title of Shortest Married Couple to Paulo, and Katyucia from Brazil.	1985– 1988–

== Shortest by age group ==
Deceased Living

Nationality	Height	Name	Category	Notes	Lifespan
United States	24 cm (9.4 in) (Note: This was Nisa's baby height; she later grew.)	Nisa Juarez	Baby	Was born 108 days premature and weighed only 320 g (11.3 oz).	2002–
United States	53.3 cm (21.0 in) (Note: This was Francis Joseph Flynn's shortest height, because he grew in height after age 16; he is not listed as one of the world's shortest men.)	Francis Joseph Flynn	Teenager	Better known as General Mite, Flynn was an American dwarf who performed as a showman at various competitions around the world. In 1884, Flynn married English little person, Millie Edwards, in England. The wedding was widely publicized and attended. From then on, the couple were exhibited as the "Royal American Midgets" and "General and Mrs. Mite" in many advertisements.	1864–1898
United States	72.4 cm (28.5 in)	Stacey Herald	Mother (Note: Filed under "Shortest woman to give birth".)	Stacey gave birth to her first child on 21 October 2006, and later birthed two more children, all of which were delivered by caesarean sections. She died on 11 September 2018.	1974–2018
Hungary	101.5 cm (40.0 in)	Susanna Bokoyni	Longevity	Bokoyni died at the age of 105, making her the oldest verified centenarian dwarf. During her lifetime she travelled with various circuses, where she was a performer.	1879–1984

== Shortest by occupation ==
=== Actors ===
Deceased Living

Nationality	Height	Name	Note	Lifespan
Dominican Republic	71 cm (28 in)	Nelson de la Rosa	Once recognized as the "world's shortest actor" and had a minor role in the 1996 film, The Island of Dr. Moreau.	1968–2006
India	76 cm (30 in)	Ajay Kumar alias Pakru	Malayalam comedy actor, in the Guinness Book of Records for being the shortest actor (2 ft 6 in (76 cm)) to play a main character in a full-length film. He played the lead role in Athbhutha Dweepu, a Malayalam film directed by Vinayan, later dubbed in Tamil.	1974–
United States	79 cm (31 in)	Tamara De Treaux	Shortest actress, noted for E.T. the Extra-Terrestrial and as an influence for the novel Maybe the Moon.	1959–1990
Philippines	83 cm (33 in)	Weng Weng	Filipino actor and martial artist who was the shortest actor to have lead roles.	1957–1992
United Kingdom	126.2 cm (49.7 in)	Kiran Shah	Shah is the world's shortest active stuntman.	1956–

=== Artists and writers ===
Deceased Living

Nationality	Height	Name	Note	Lifespan
England	137 cm (54 in)	Alexander Pope	English poet and satirist, never grew beyond 4 ft 6 in (137 cm).	1688–1744
France	142 cm (56 in)	Édith Piaf	French singer and actress, never grew beyond 4 ft 8 in (142 cm). Known for her small stature, born Édith Gassion, nicknamed Piaf, Parisian slang for "Little Sparrow"	1915–1963

=== Athletes ===
Deceased Living

Nationality	Height	Name	Sport	Note	Lifespan
India	84 cm (33 in)	Aditya "Romeo" Dev	Bodybuilding	"World's Smallest Bodybuilder" at 2 ft. 9 in.	1988–2012
United States	109 cm (43 in)	Eddie Gaedel	Baseball	Shortest to play in Major League Baseball. This however was a publicity stunt and Gaedel only stood once at the plate.	1925–1961
Canada	130 cm (51 in)	Lionel Giroux	Wrestling	Also known as "Little Beaver". Shortest professional wrestler in the WWF at around 4'4".	1935–1995
United States	132 cm (52 in)	Dylan Postl	Wrestling	Worlds shortest living professional wrestler.	1986–
United States	149 cm (59 in)	Julie Krone	Horse racing	Shortest American jockey, stand 4 ft 10.5 in (149 cm).	1963–
England	152 cm (60 in)	Tich Cornford	Cricket	Shortest ever international cricketer.	1900–1964
Australia	155 cm (61 in)	Jim Bradford	Australian rules football	Shortest to play Australian rules football at the highest level.	1926–2005
United States	155 cm (61 in)	Jack Shapiro	American football	Shortest professional player of American football, but only for one game.	1907–2001
United Kingdom	157 cm (62 in)	Frederick Walden	Association football	Shortest player in England national football team history (5 ft 2 in (157 cm)).	1888–1949
United States	157 cm (62 in)	Shannon Bobbitt	Basketball	Shortest to play in the Women's National Basketball Association.	1985–
United States	160 cm (63 in)	Muggsy Bogues	Basketball	Shortest at 5 ft 3 in to play in the National Basketball Association.	1965–
Canada	160 cm (63 in)	Roy Worters	Ice hockey	Shortest to play in the National Hockey League and was inducted into the Hockey Hall of Fame in 1969.	1900–1957
United States	165 cm (65 in)	Trindon Holliday	American football	Holliday was formerly the shortest active player at 5 ft 5 in in the National Football League until 2015.	1986–
Venezuela	165 cm (65 in)	Jose Altuve	Baseball	Shortest active player at 5 ft 5 in in Major League Baseball.	1990–

=== Politicians ===
Deceased Living

Nationality	Height	Name	Note	Lifespan
United States	114 cm (45 in)	Charley Lockhart	Shortest public official in America (at the time), when he was sworn in as Texas State Treasurer in 1931.	1876–1954
Mexico	137 cm (54 in)	Benito Juárez	Reportedly the shortest world leader to have height recorded. He was reportedly 4 ft 6 in or 1.37 meters.	1806–1872
Italy	153 cm (60 in)	Victor Emmanuel III of Italy	Shortest king of Italy.	1869–1947
Italy	154 cm (61 in)	Renato Brunetta	Italian politician and former Minister	1950–
United States	163 cm (64 in)	James Madison	Shortest US president at 5 ft 4 in or 1.63 m.	1751–1836
Philippines	150 cm (59 in)	Gloria Macapagal Arroyo	Shortest Philippine President at 4 ft 11 in or 1.50 m.	1947–
Northern Ireland	160 cm (63 in)	Robin Swann	Minister of Health (2020–)	1971–
Japan	124 cm (49 in)	Tokugawa Tsunayoshi	His spirit tablet in Daiju-ji is shortest of all Tokugawa shōguns whose spirit tablets are made the height as their own body.	1646–1709
Japan	154.4 cm (60.8 in)	Tokugawa Ieyoshi	Shortest shōgun whose remains are excavated. His spirit tablet is 1.535 meters tall.	1793–1853

=== Others ===
Deceased Living

Nationality	Height	Name	Occupation	Note	Lifespan
France	58 cm (23 in)	Richebourg	Spy	Richebourg was a secret agent during the French Revolution, who disguised himself as an infant to pass information along.	1768–1858
United States	152 cm (60 in)	Nancy J. Currie-Gregg	Astronaut	Currie became the shortest person in space when she flew in July 1993 as a Mission specialist on STS-57.	1958–

== See also ==
- Dwarfism
- Pygmy peoples
- Caroline Crachami, a person about 50 cm (19.5 in) tall
- Little people (mythology)
- List of dwarfism organisations
- Dwarfs and pygmies in ancient Egypt
- List of tallest people
