= Svetlana Pankratova =

Russian world record holder

Svetlana Pankratova Светлана Панкратова
- Born: 29 April 1971 (age 54); Volgograd, Russian SFSR, Soviet Union
- Education: Virginia Commonwealth University
- Known for: Previous record-holder for the longest legs of any woman in the world
- Height: 1.96 m (6 ft 5 in)

Svetlana Pankratova (born April 29, 1971) is a Russian woman formerly recognized, according to Guinness World Records, as having the longest legs of any woman in the world.

While she is not the world's tallest woman, her legs are 132 centimeters long. Because her upper body is of much more typical dimensions, she is 1.95 m (6 ft 5 in) tall. She has also very large feet, size 13 (US) / 46 (EU).

Pankratova was born in Volgograd, Russian SFSR, USSR. She played women's basketball at Virginia Commonwealth University in Richmond, Virginia, US, from 1992 to 1995. She was an impact player, setting two school records which are still unbroken:

No. 1 ⁃ Career Blocked Shots, 1992–95 (176)
No. 1 ⁃ Single Season Total Blocked Shots, 1994–95 (75)
No. 8 ⁃ Single Season Field Goals, 1994–95 (178)

Pankratova appeared in Trafalgar Square in London on 16 September 2008, with He Pingping, then the smallest man in the world (before his death in March 2010), to promote the 2009 edition of the Guinness World Records. Along with her native Russian, Pankratova speaks English and some Spanish. She lived in Torremolinos, Spain.

On 11 March 2013, it was reported that Pankratova returned to Virginia after marrying local resident Jack Gosnell. She accepted a position as an assistant coach for the Meridian High School girls’ basketball team.

In 2017, Pankratova was surpassed by Yekaterina Lisina (also Russian) for the record of the woman with the longest legs.
