= Ossendrecht =

- Village
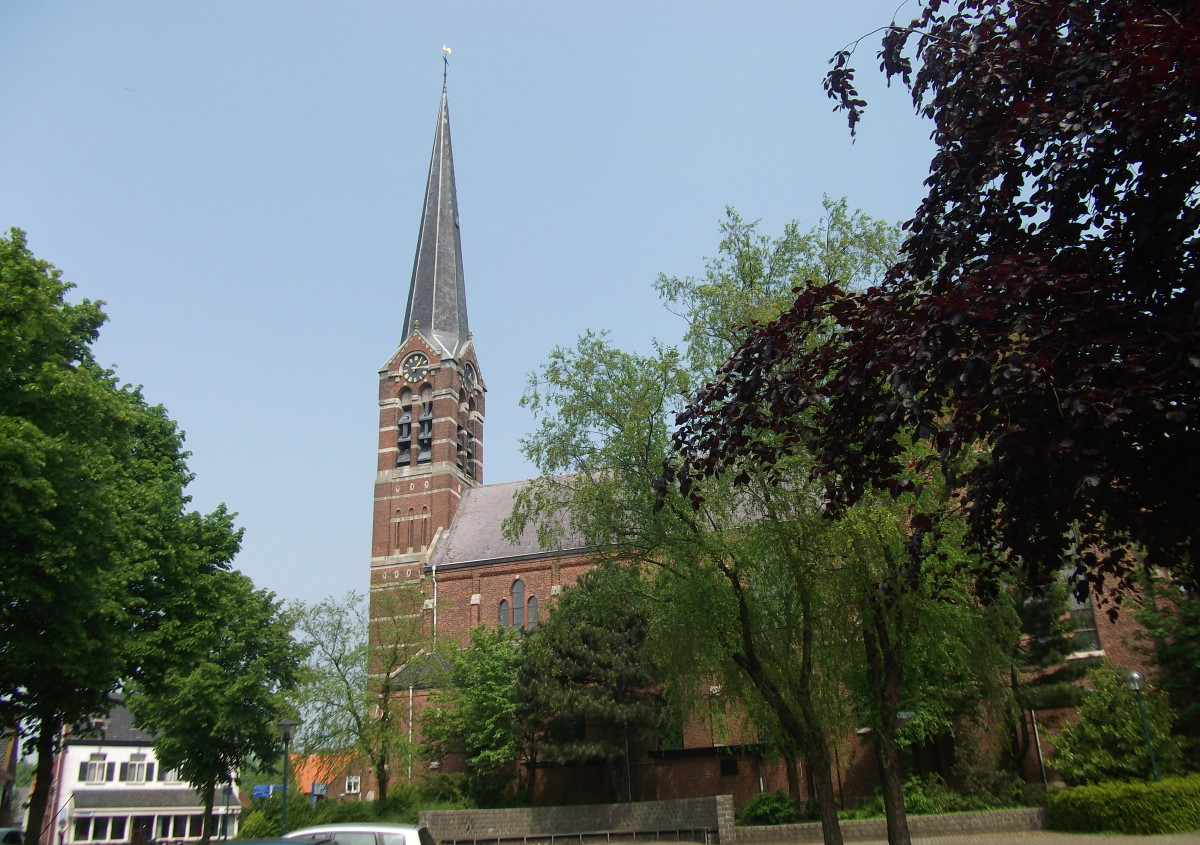
- St Gertudis Church

- Location in the province of North Brabant in the Netherlands Ossendrecht (Netherlands)
- Coordinates: 51°23′38″N 4°19′40″E
- Country: Netherlands
- Province: North Brabant
- Municipality: Woensdrecht

Area
  - Total: 27.76 km^{2} (10.72 sq mi)
- Elevation: 10 m (33 ft)

Population (2021)
  - Total: 4,805
  - Density: 173.1/km^{2} (448.3/sq mi)
- Time zone: UTC+1 (CET)
  - Summer (DST): UTC+2 (CEST)
- Postal code: 4641
- Dialing code: 0164

Ossendrecht is a village in the Dutch province of North Brabant. It is located in the municipality of Woensdrecht, about 12 km southeast of Bergen op Zoom.

The village was first mentioned in 1187 as "Alardus de Ossendreht", and is a combination of ferry / waterway and ox. Ossendrecht developed around a triangular village square.

During the 19th century, Ossendrecht became a centre of cichorium cultivation and processing. Ossendrecht was home to 214 people in 1840. Ossendrecht was a separate municipality until 1997, when it became part of Woensdrecht.

== Notable people ==
- Pauline Musters, recognized by the Guinness Book of World Records as the shortest woman ever recorded, was born here on 26 February 1876.

== Gallery ==
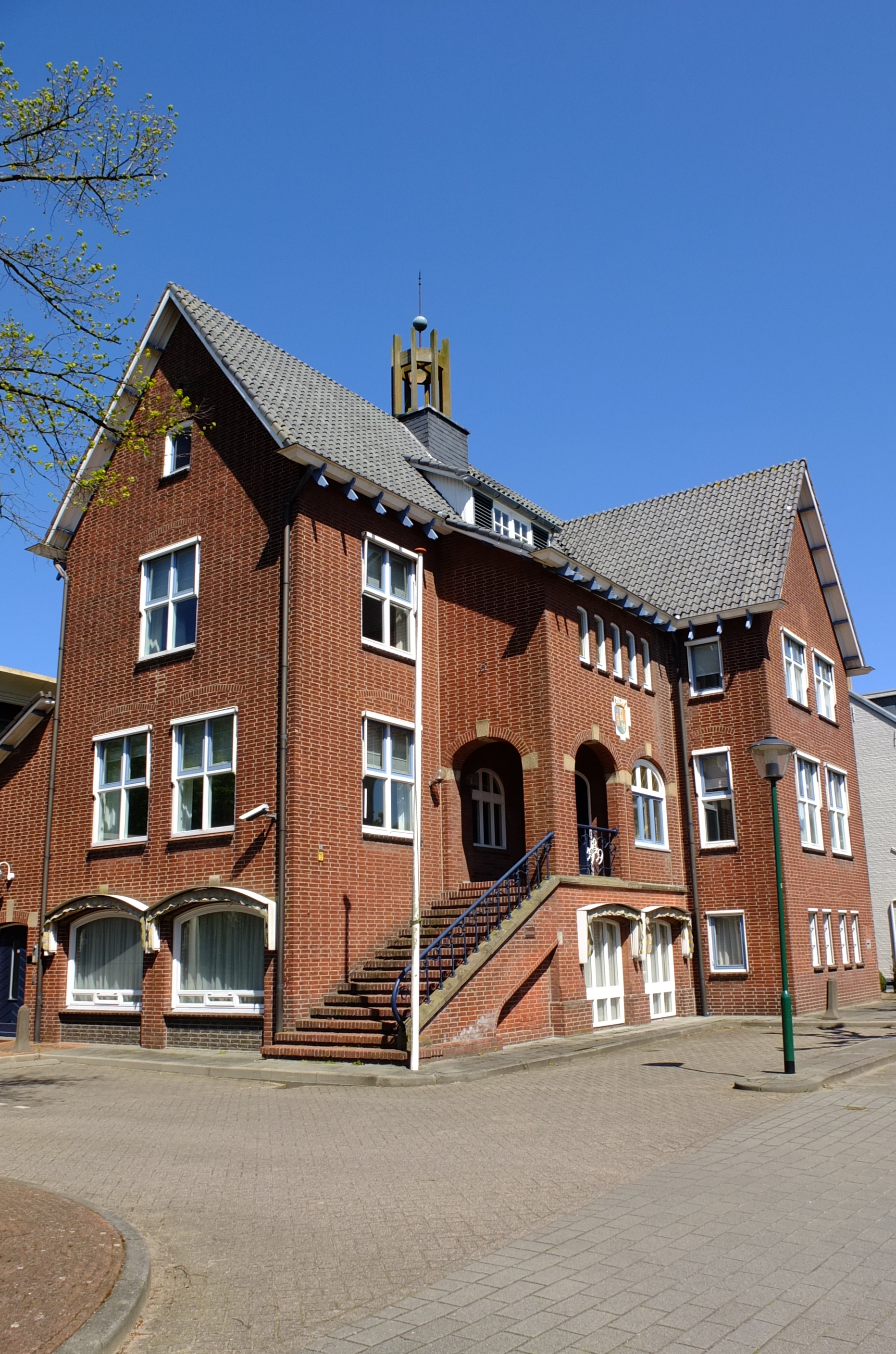
Town hall

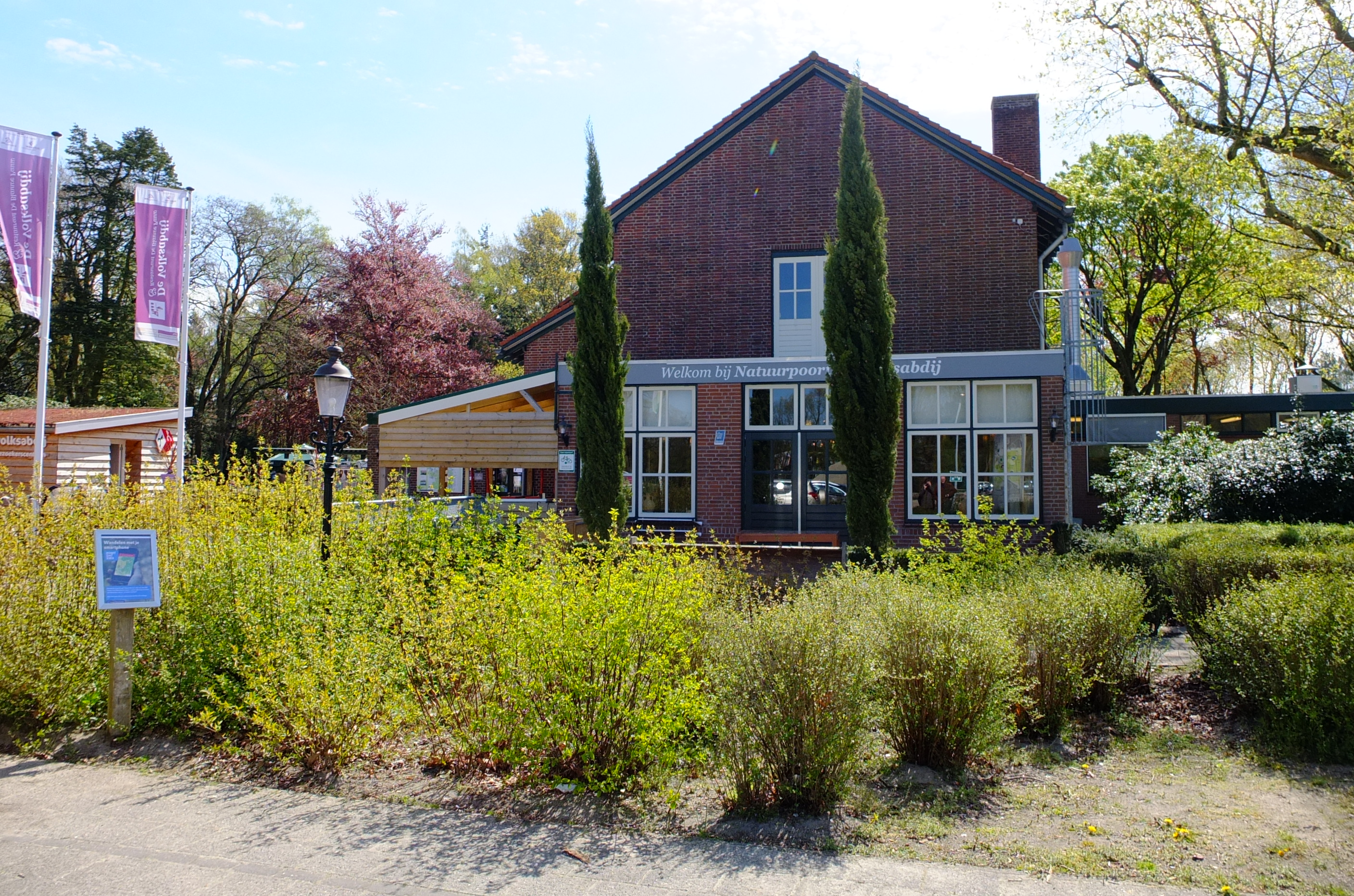
Nature area Volksabdij

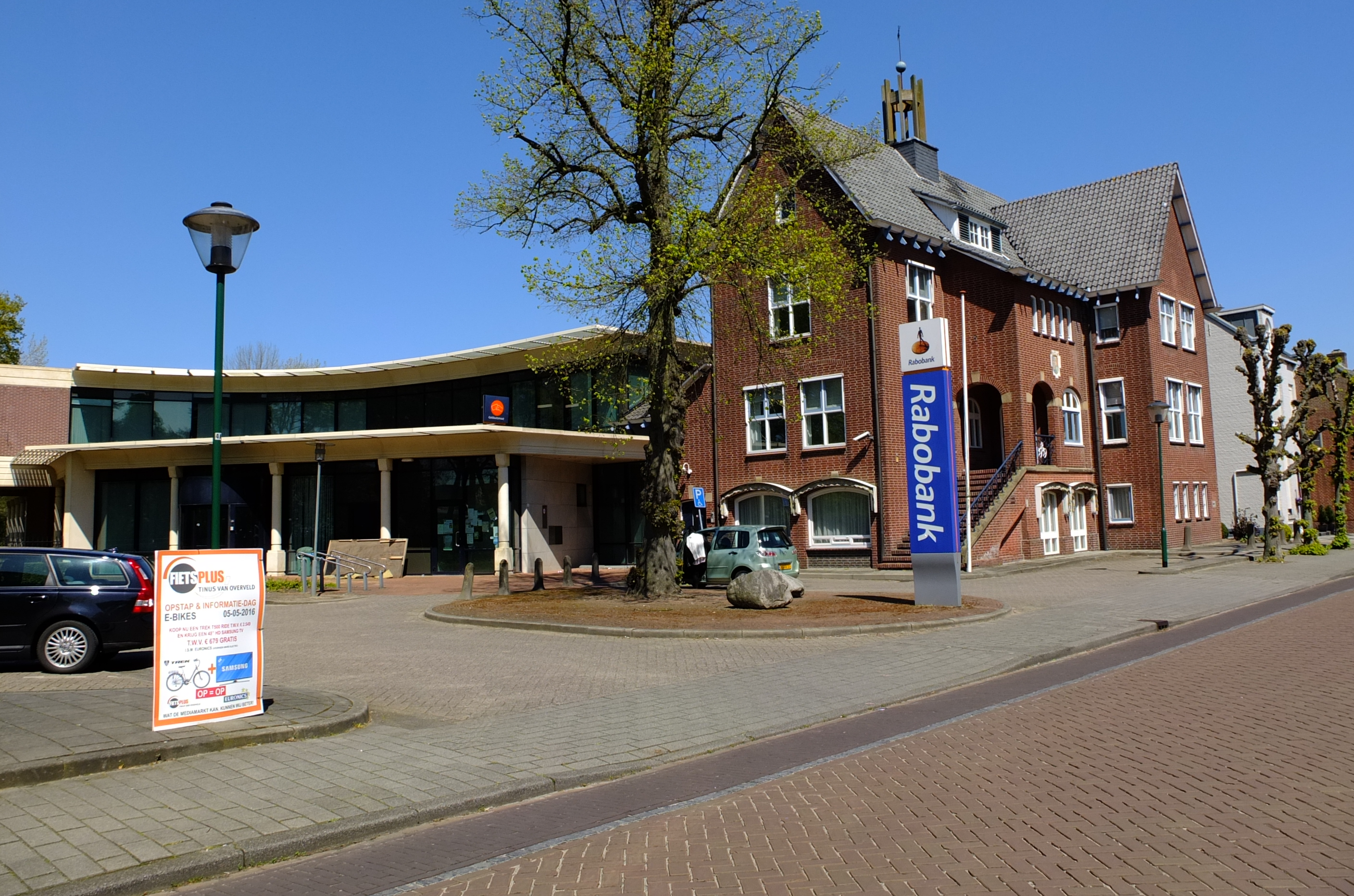
Village street

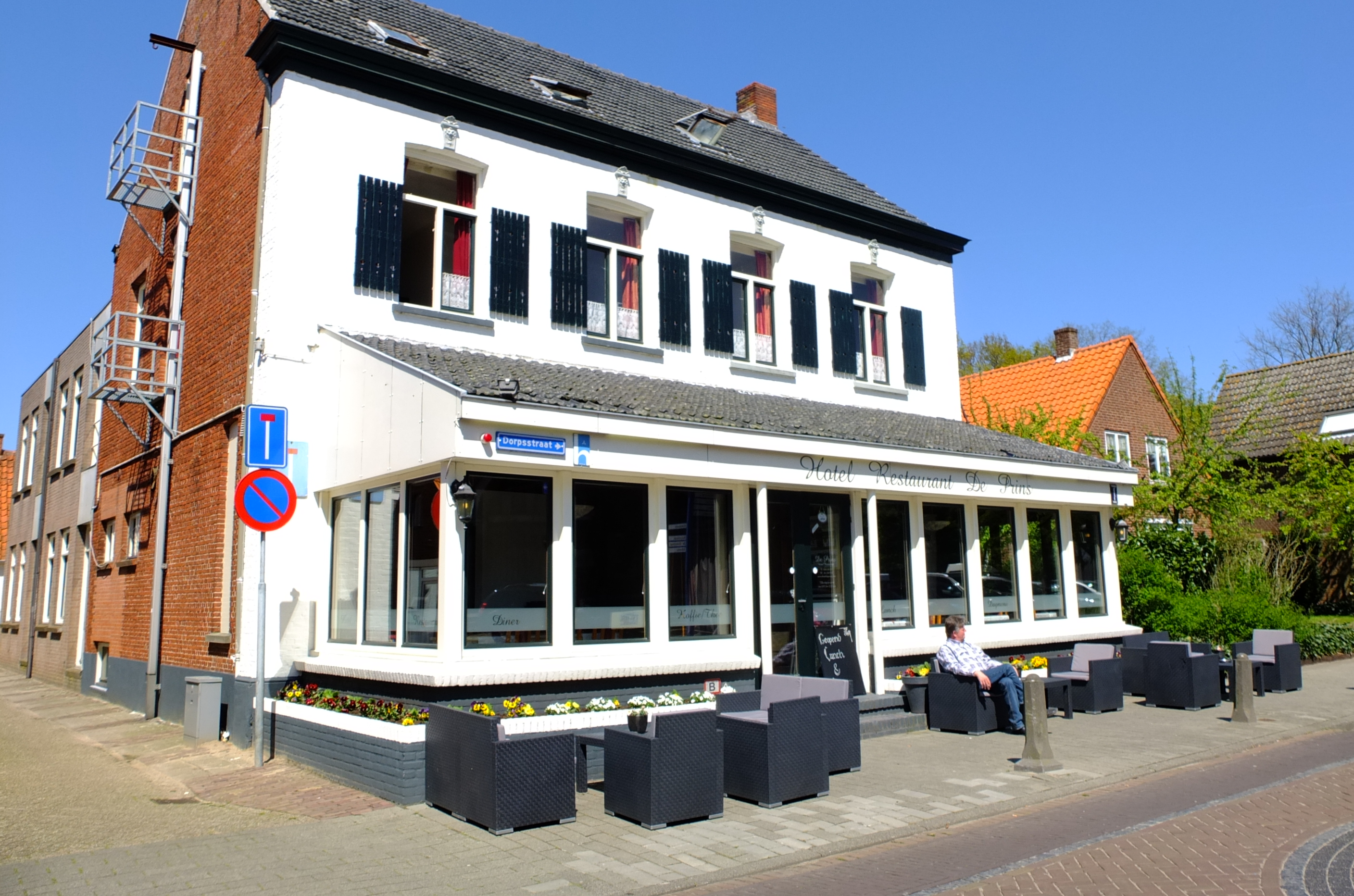
Hotel in Ossendrecht
