= Edward Niño Hernández =

World's shortest living man

- Born: May 10, 1986 (age 39); Bogotá, Colombia
- Occupation: Dancer/actor
- Known for: Being one of the world's shortest living men

Edward Niño Hernández (born May 10, 1986) is the world's second-shortest living mobile man. He was certified on September 4, 2010, by the Guinness World Records. At 24 years of age, Hernandez was 0.7 m (2 ft 3 1/2 in) tall and weighed 10 kg (22 lb). At 33 years of age, Hernandez was 0.721 m (2 ft 4 1/2 in) tall. He lives in Bogotá, Colombia.

The previous titleholder, He Pingping of Inner Mongolia, was 3.8 cm (1.5 inches) taller and died on March 13, 2010, in Rome, Italy, where he was filming the TV program Lo show dei record. Hernandez's reign ended on October 14, 2010, when Khagendra Thapa Magar of Nepal turned 18. He reclaimed the record following Magar's death on January 17, 2020, and lost it again on December 13, 2022, to Afshin Ghaderzadeh of Iran when he was aged 20.

He appeared on the TV programme Susana Giménez in Argentina.

== See also ==
- Dwarfism
- Human height
- List of people with dwarfism
- List of shortest people
