= PCNT =

Protein-coding gene in humans

Identifiers
- Aliases: PCNT, KEN, MOPD2, PCN, PCNT2, PCNTB, PCTN2, SCKL4, pericentrin
- External IDs: OMIM: 605925; MGI: 102722; GeneCards: PCNT

Gene location (Human)
Chr.	Chromosome 21 (human)
Band	21q22.3	Start	46,324,141 bp
Band	21q22.3	End	46,445,769 bp

Gene location (Mouse)
Chr.	Chromosome 10 (mouse)
Band	10|10 C1	Start	76,187,097 bp
Band	10|10 C1	End	76,278,620 bp
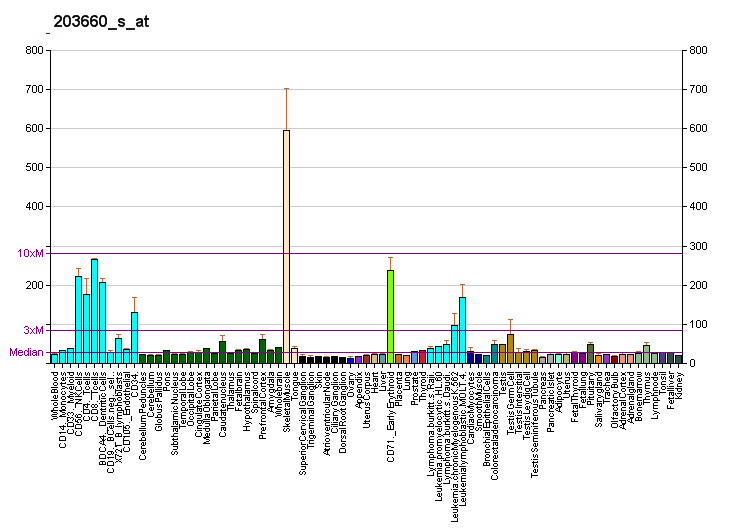
RNA expression pattern
Bgee	Human / Mouse (ortholog); Top expressed in: gastrocnemius muscle; body of tongue; muscle of thigh; thoracic diaphragm; Skeletal muscle tissue of rectus abdominis; glutes; triceps brachii muscle; biceps brachii; Skeletal muscle tissue of biceps brachii; middle temporal gyrus / Top expressed in: primary oocyte; zygote; interventricular septum; muscle of thigh; secondary oocyte; soleus muscle; hand; foot; extraocular muscle; ascending aorta; More reference expression data
BioGPS	More reference expression data
Gene ontology
Molecular function	protein binding; calmodulin binding; molecular adaptor activity
Cellular component	centriole; centrosome; centriolar satellite; microtubule; membrane; cytoskeleton; cytoplasm; microtubule organizing center; cytosol
Biological process	positive regulation of intracellular protein transport; mitotic spindle organization; G2/M transition of mitotic cell cycle; microtubule cytoskeleton organization; cilium assembly; ciliary basal body-plasma membrane docking; regulation of G2/M transition of mitotic cell cycle; signal transduction
Sources:Amigo / QuickGO
Orthologs
Databases	NCBI: entry; OMA: entry
Species	Human	Mouse
Entrez	5116	18541
Ensembl	ENSG00000160299	ENSMUSG00000001151
UniProt	O95613	P48725
RefSeq (mRNA)	NM_006031; NM_001315529	NM_001282992; NM_008787
RefSeq (protein)	NP_001302458; NP_006022	NP_001269921; NP_032813
Location (UCSC)	Chr 21: 46.32 – 46.45 Mb	Chr 10: 76.19 – 76.28 Mb
PubMed search
- Wikidata
View/Edit Human	View/Edit Mouse

Pericentrin (kendrin), also known as PCNT and pericentrin-B (PCNTB), is a protein which in humans is encoded by the PCNT gene on chromosome 21. This protein localizes to the centrosome and recruits proteins to the pericentriolar matrix (PCM) to ensure proper centrosome and mitotic spindle formation, and thus, uninterrupted cell cycle progression. This gene is implicated in many diseases and disorders, including congenital disorders such as microcephalic osteodysplastic primordial dwarfism type II (MOPDII) and Seckel syndrome.

== Structure ==
PCNT is a 360 kDa protein which contains a series of coiled coil domains and a highly conserved PCM targeting motif called the PACT domain near its C-terminus. The PACT domain is responsible for targeting the protein to the centrosomes and attaching it to the centriole walls during interphase. In addition, PCNT possesses five nuclear export sequences which all contribute to its nuclear export into the cytoplasm, as well as one nuclear localization signal composed of three clusters of basic amino acids, all of which contribute to the protein's nuclear localization.

PCNTB, a cDNA homolog of PCNT, was identified and described by Li et al. to share a sequence identity of 61% and similarity of 75%. However, compared to PCNT, PCNTB contains an additional coiled coil domain and unique 1000-residue C-terminus, suggesting that these two may be separate proteins in a new CPM superfamily. As with PCNT, the C-terminus of PCNTB contains functional domains for centriole localization and CEP215 binding. The N-terminus may also contain a functional domain that associates with the C-terminus domain, and this association is required for engagement with the centriole.

== Function ==
The protein encoded by this gene is expressed in the cytoplasm and centrosome throughout the cell cycle, and to a lesser extent, in the nucleus. It is an integral component of the PCM, which is a centrosome scaffold that anchors microtubule nucleating complexes and other centrosomal proteins. In one model, PCNT complexes with CEP215 and is phosphorylated by PLK1, leading to PCM component recruitment and organization, centrosome maturation, and spindle formation. The protein controls the nucleation of microtubules by interacting with the microtubule nucleation component γ-tubulin, thus anchoring the γ-tubulin ring complex to the centrosome, which is essential for bipolar spindle formation and chromosome assembly in early mitosis. This ensures normal function and organization of the centrosomes, mitotic spindles, and cytoskeleton, and by extension, regulation over cell cycle progression and checkpoints. Downregulation of PCNT disrupted mitotic checkpoints and arrested the cell at the G2/M checkpoint, leading to cell death. Moreover, microtubule functioning was also disrupted, resulting in mono- or multipolar spindles, chromosomal misalignment, premature sister chromatid separation, and aneuploidy.

PCNT is highly abundant in skeletal muscle, indicating that it may be involved in muscle insulin action. PCNT is also involved in neuronal development through its interaction with DISC1 to regulate microtubule organization.

== Clinical significance ==
Mutations in the PCNT gene have been linked to Down syndrome (DS); two types of primordial dwarfism, MOPDII and Seckel syndrome; intrauterine growth retardation; cardiomyopathy; early onset type 2 diabetes; chronic myeloid leukemia (CML); bipolar affective disorder; and other congenital disorders. In particular, the short stature and small brain size characteristic of MOPDII and Seckel syndrome have been attributed to centrosome dysfunction and cell growth disruption as a result of PCNT malfunction. Additionally, premature aging, cerebral involution, inflammatory and immune responses are linked to DS associated with PCNT mutations, while severe insulin resistance, diabetes, and dyslipidemia are featured in MOPDII associated with PCNT mutations.

== Interactions ==
PCNT has been shown to interact with:

- calmodulin,
- separase,
- CEP215,
- CHD3/4,
- protein kinase A,
- protein kinase C,
- DISC1,
- γ-tubulin complex proteins, and
- PCM1.
