= Junrey Balawing =

Filipino record holder for shortness

- Born: June 12, 1993; Sindangan, Zamboanga del Norte
- Died: July 28, 2020 (aged 27); Dapitan, Zamboanga del Norte
- Known for: Shortest recognised living person (September 3, 2015); Third shortest man ever
- Height: 59.93 cm (1 ft 11.59 in)

Junrey Balawing (/dʒuːnˈriː/ joon-REE; Tagalog pronunciation: [dʒunˈrɪ bɐˈlawɪŋ]; born June 12, 1993 – July 28, 2020) was a Filipino record holder at the Guinness World Records for the world's shortest man alive measuring at 60.00 centimetres (23.62 in) tall. The declaration came during Balawing's 18th birthday celebration. Guinness World Records official said Balawing broke the record of Khagendra Thapa Magar of Nepal, who was 0.67 m (2 ft 2 1/3 in) tall.

He stopped growing at the age of 1. Balawing, the son of a poor blacksmith, was born and lived in Sindangan, Zamboanga del Norte, about 865 kilometres (537 mi) south of the capital Manila. Although he was documented as the shortest living man, he missed the title of shortest man in history, which was held until 2012 by Gul Mohammed of India, who was 57 centimetres (22 in) tall and died on October 1, 1997.

In February 2012, Chandra Bahadur Dangi of Nepal, who stands 54.6 centimetres (21.5 in) tall was declared the world's shortest living man ever. As a result, Junrey held the record as shortest living man for less than a year.

Following the death of Chandra Bahadur Dangi on September 3, 2015, Balawing held the title of the shortest living man until his death at the age of 27 on July 28, 2020. He had been hospitalized for pneumonia. Prior to his death, he resided in Dapitan with his family.

== See also ==
- List of shortest people

Preceded by Khagendra Thapa Magar	Shortest recognised living person 2011–2012	Succeeded by Chandra Bahadur Dangi
Preceded by Chandra Bahadur Dangi	Shortest recognised living person 2015–2020	Succeeded by -
