= Microcephalic osteodysplastic primordial dwarfism type II =

- Other names: Majewski osteodysplastic primordial dwarfism type II
- Microcephalic osteodysplastic primordial dwarfism type II is inherited in an autosomal recessive manner
- Specialty: Medical genetics

Microcephalic osteodysplastic primordial dwarfism type II (MOPD II) is a form of primordial dwarfism associated with brain and skeletal abnormalities. It was characterized in 1982.

MOPD II is listed as a rare disease by the Office of Rare Diseases (ORD) of the National Institutes of Health (NIH). This indicates that MOPD (or a subtype of MOPD) affects less than 200,000 people in the US population.

It is associated with the protein pericentrin (PCNT).

Intelligence is reported to be usually within low-normal or mild intellectual disability range. Some have average levels of intelligence, but it may be masked by specific learning disability.

== Notable persons with MOPD II ==
- Lucia Zarate, sideshow entertainer
- Bridgette Jordan, smallest living woman until her death in 2019

== See also ==
- Primordial dwarfism
