= Rumeysa Gelgi =

Current tallest living woman since 2021

- Born: 1 January 1997 (age 29); Karabük, Turkey
- Occupation: Web developer
- Known for: World's tallest living woman
- Height: 2.15 m (7 ft 1/2 in)
- Website: rumeysagelgi.com

Rumeysa Gelgi (born 1 January 1997) is a Turkish advocate and web developer. Since 2021, she has been the tallest living woman recognised by Guinness World Records.

Gelgi also holds the following titles:

- the largest hands (female) — since 2022
- the widest hand span (female) — since 2022
- the longest fingers (female) — since 2022
- the longest back (female) — since 2022
- the longest ears (female) — since 2024
- the longest baby (female) — since 2024

Gelgi holds the title of tallest living female, given by Guinness World Records. She is 215.16 cm (7 ft 0.71 in) tall, and weighs 99 kg (218 lbs). She has unofficially been surpassed by Chinese professional basketball player Zhang Ziyu.

Gelgi lives in the Karabük province of Turkey. Her height is caused by Weaver syndrome, a rare condition which causes rapid growth and other physical abnormalities. It affects men three times more than women. Because of her condition, she usually uses a wheelchair to move, but is able to walk short distances with a walker.

On 28 September 2022, Gelgi flew on an airplane for the first time in her life. To accommodate her, Turkish Airlines had to install a stretcher across six seats spanning three rows on one of their planes to make her trip from Istanbul to San Francisco possible. The event drew media attention and was shown in a Guinness World Records documentary titled Rumeysa: Walking Tall.

On 21 November 2024, she met Jyoti Amge, the shortest woman in the world, for the first time, at the Savoy Hotel in London, England. The meeting marked the celebration of Guinness World Records Day and the organisation's 70th anniversary. Gelgi and Amge's joint appearances in London received widespread media coverage and public interest.

== See also ==
- Sultan Kösen, the world's tallest living person (also from Turkey)
- Jyoti Amge, the world's shortest living woman
- Zeng Jinlian, the tallest woman ever to live
- Zhang Ziyu, Chinese basketball player
