= Franklin Edson =

American politician (1832–1904)

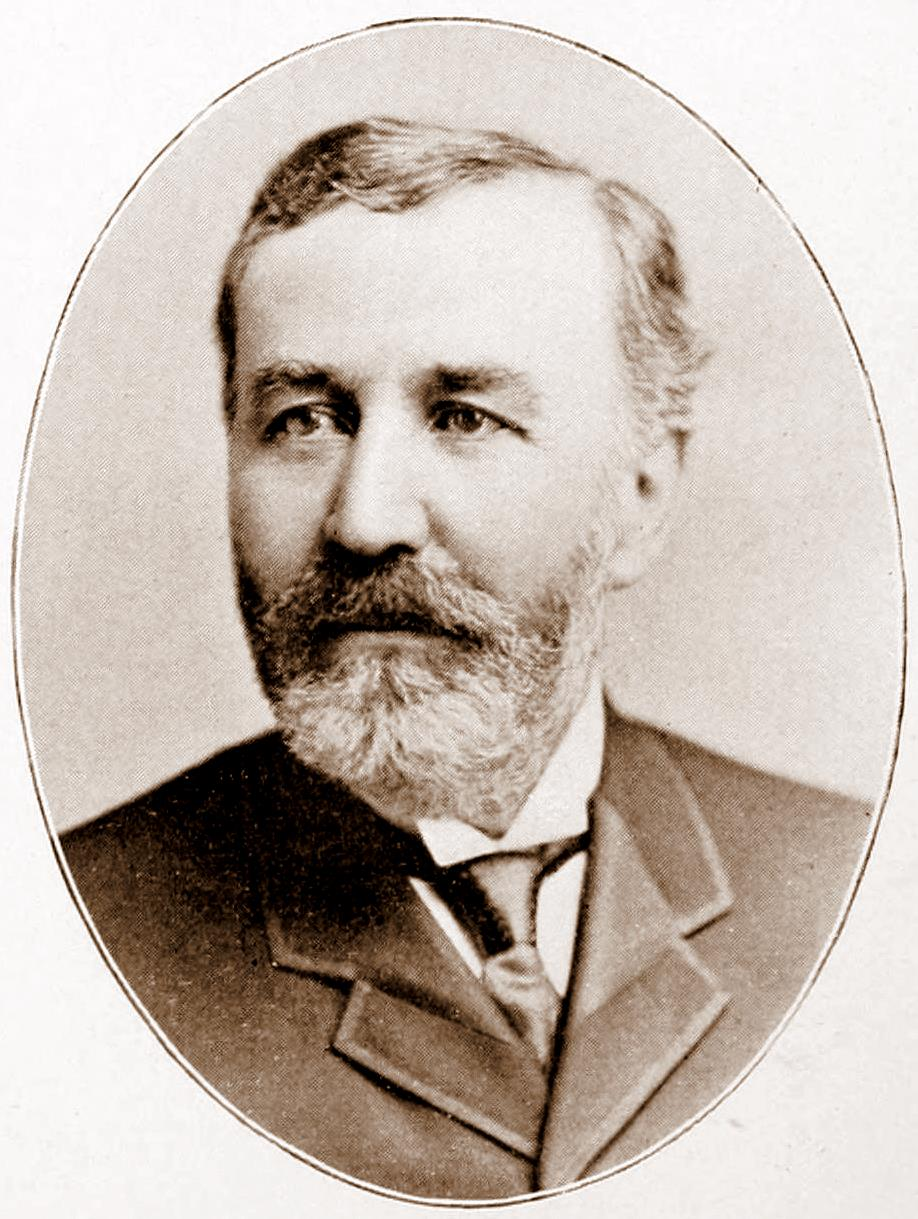

86th Mayor of New York City
- In office 1883–1884
- Preceded by: William Russell Grace
- Succeeded by: William Russell Grace

Personal details
- Born: April 5, 1832 Chester, Vermont, U.S.
- Died: September 24, 1904 (aged 72) New York City, New York, U.S.
- Resting place: Albany Rural Cemetery
- Party: Democratic
- Spouse: Frances Cameron Wood (m. 1856; died 1893)
- Parent(s): Soviah Wilson; Opher Edson

Franklin Edson (April 5, 1832 – September 24, 1904) was an American merchant who served as the 86th Mayor of New York from 1883 to 1884.

== Early life ==
Edson was born in Chester, Vermont on April 5, 1832, where his father had a farm. A descendant of the Puritans, he was the son of Soviah (née Wilson) Edson and Opher Edson.

He was educated at the local schools and at the Chester Academy in Vermont.

== Career ==
=== Business ===
At age twenty, Edson moved to Albany to work in his brother Cyrus' distillery, becoming a partner three years later.

He left the distillery after his brother's death and started a produce business, which he relocated to New York City in 1866. His venture proved successful during the American Civil War, making Edson wealthy and enabling him to engage in civic, religious and charitable causes. He was an active Episcopalian and a member of Saint James Church, Fordham, in the Bronx.

In 1873, he became one of the city's most important business leaders when he was appointed President of the New York Produce Exchange.

=== Politics ===
An anti-Tammany Democrat, in 1882 he was nominated for Mayor through the efforts of Tammany Hall boss John Murphy to avoid a Democratic Party split between organization loyalists and reformers. Upon taking office in 1883, he angered reformers by appointing Tammany men to key jobs, but he soon embraced civil service reform and other honest government measures.

During his term the Brooklyn Bridge was dedicated, the Manhattan Municipal Building was constructed, and work was completed on the city's new water supply, the Croton Aqueduct. He appointed the commission responsible for the selection and location of public lands for parks in the Bronx, which came to include Van Cortlandt, Bronx, Pelham Bay, Crotona, Claremont and St. Mary's Parks, and the Mosholu, Bronx River, Pelham, and Crotona Parkways.

After Edson split with Tammany the 1884 Democratic nomination for Mayor went to William Russell Grace, who had also preceded Edson as Mayor, and Edson retired from politics at the completion of his term in 1885.

After leaving the mayor's office, Edson returned to his business interests and continued his philanthropic activities.

== Personal life ==
In 1856, Edson was married to Frances Cameron "Fannie" Wood (1835–1893), the daughter of Benjamin Howland Wood. Fannie was the granddaughter of Jethro Wood, inventor of the cast-iron moldboard plow. They owned a homestead in Morris Heights, Bronx that consisted of three acres, a stately residence, stable and barn, which he exchanged for 247 Central Park West, two doors south of the corner of 85th Street, in 1893. Together, Fannie and Franklin were the parents of:

- Cyrus Edson (1857–1903), a doctor who married Virginia Churchill Paige (1853–1891). He served as the New York City Health Commissioner.
- Franklin (1859–1926), who married Elsie Squier.
- David Orr Edson (1862–1923), a doctor.
- Henry Townsend Edson (1864–1903), who married Margarita Diehl. In 1903, Henry Edson murdered his friend's wife and then committed suicide.
- Edith Edson (b. 1870), who married Willis Benner.
- Robert S. (1873–1941), who married Fanny Ropes.
- Ethel Townsend Edson (b. 1877), who married Arthur Hoffman Van Brunt (b. 1865).

He died at his home in Manhattan on September 24, 1904. He was buried in Section 15, Lot 16 at Albany Rural Cemetery, Menands, New York.

=== Legacy ===
Edson Avenue in The Bronx is named for him.

Political offices
Preceded by William Russell Grace	Mayor of New York City; 1883–1884	Succeeded by William Russell Grace
