= Lucía Zárate =

Mexican entertainer with dwarfism (1864–1890)

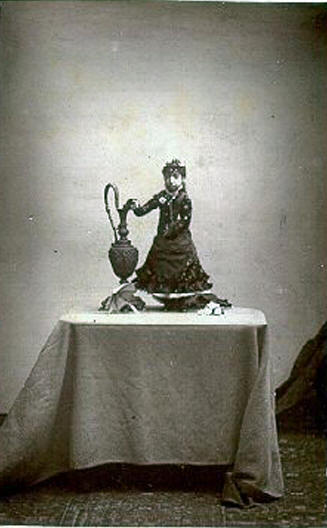
- Photograph of Lucía Zárate
- Born: January 2, 1864; San Carlos Chachalacas, Veracruz, Mexico
- Died: January 28, 1890 or January 29, 1890 (aged 26); Truckee, California, US
- Known for: "Lightest Recorded Adult"
- Height: 50.8 cm (20.0 in) (claimed); 68 cm (26.8 in) (GWR)

Lucía Zárate (January 2, 1864 – January 28 or 29, 1890) was a Mexican entertainer with dwarfism who performed in sideshows. Zárate is the first person to have been identified with Majewski osteodysplastic primordial dwarfism type II. She was entered into the Guinness World Records as the "lightest recorded adult", weighing 4.7 pounds (2.1 kg) at the age of 17.

== Early life ==
Lucía Zárate was born on January 2, 1864, in San Carlos Chachalacas (now Úrsulo Galván), Veracruz, Mexico. Zárate's family soon resettled in the nearby town of Agostadero (now Zempoala).

Zárate is the earliest known person to have been retrospectively identified as having Majewski osteodysplastic primordial dwarfism type II (MOPD II), a rare genetic form of primordial dwarfism.

At age 12, while touring in the United States in 1876, Zárate was examined by several physicians. Although they could not independently verify her age, they concluded from the development of her teeth that she was at least six years old. The physicians recorded her height as 20 in (51 cm) and noted that her calf measured 4 in (10 cm) in circumference, only 1 in (2.5 cm) larger than the thumb of an average adult man.

The physicians described Zárate as healthy and intelligent. They noted that she spoke her native Spanish as well as some English.

At age 17, Zárate was recorded as weighing 4.7 pounds (2.1 kg), leading to her recognition by Guinness World Records as the "lightest recorded adult". By age 20, she reportedly weighed 14 pounds (6.4 kg), nearly three times her earlier recorded weight.

== Career ==
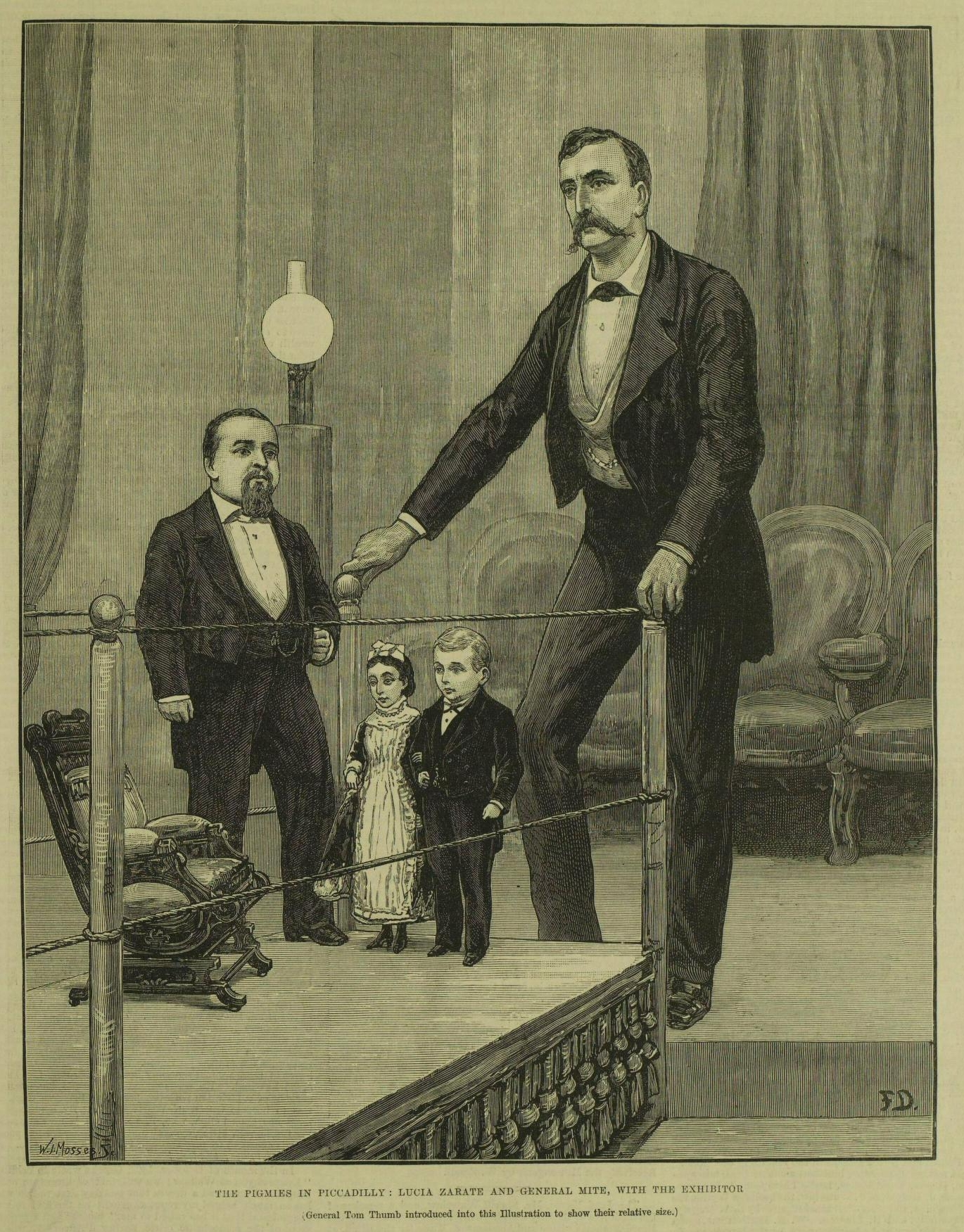
In London

At age twelve, Zárate moved from Mexico to the United States, where she was exhibited for her small stature. She first worked as part of an act billed as the "Fairy Sisters", later partnering with Francis Joseph Flynn (billed under the stage name "General Mite") to exhibit internationally. In 1889 she was billed in The Washington Post as the "marvelous Mexican midget" and described as "a tiny but all powerful magnet to draw the public."

== Death ==
On January 15, 1890, while traveling on the Central Pacific Railroad to San Francisco for an appearance, an intense blizzard known as "the Great Snow Blockade of 1890" caused the train to become stalled at Truckee, California. Zárate was one of hundreds of passengers trapped in blizzard conditions that lasted for weeks in what was then very remote areas in the Sierra Nevada and western Nevada, awaiting the progress of a rotary snowplow that would clear passage for the stuck trains. Many fell ill as influenza spread among the trapped passengers, with a single train car serving as a makeshift infirmary, as Truckee lacked any sort of medical facilities. Several passengers died, among them Lucía Zárate, who, according to varied reports, died on January 28 or 29, of what has been variously described as a gastritis and/or exposure.

== Legacy ==
As of September 2011, her family home in Zempoala, known as Casa Grande, was open to the public as a museum.

== Notes ==
| Preceded by Nobody | Shortest Recognized Woman ever 1864-1895 | Succeeded by Pauline Musters |

| Preceded by Nobody | Shortest Recognized adult human ever 1864-1895 | Succeeded by Pauline Musters |
