= PCM1 =

Protein-coding gene in the species Homo sapiens

Identifiers
- Aliases: PCM1, PTC4, RET/PCM-1, pericentriolar material 1
- External IDs: OMIM: 600299; MGI: 1277958; GeneCards: PCM1

Gene location (Mouse)
Chr.	Chromosome 8 (mouse)
Band	8 A4|8 23.89 cM	Start	41,239,752 bp
Band	8 A4|8 23.89 cM	End	41,332,344 bp
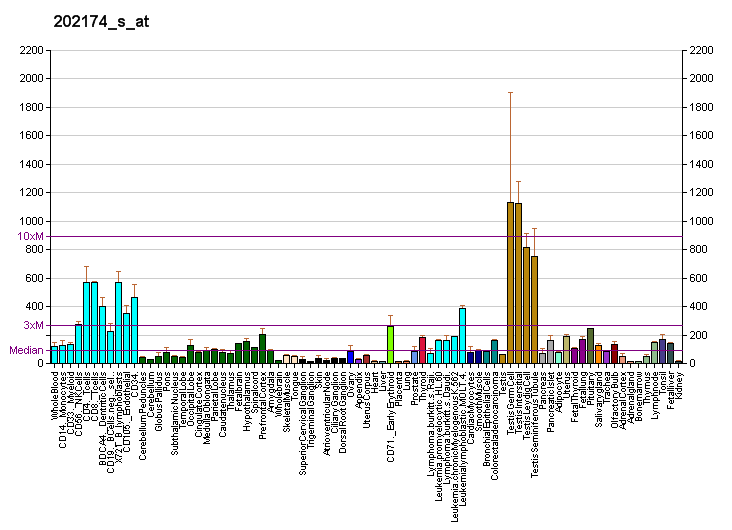

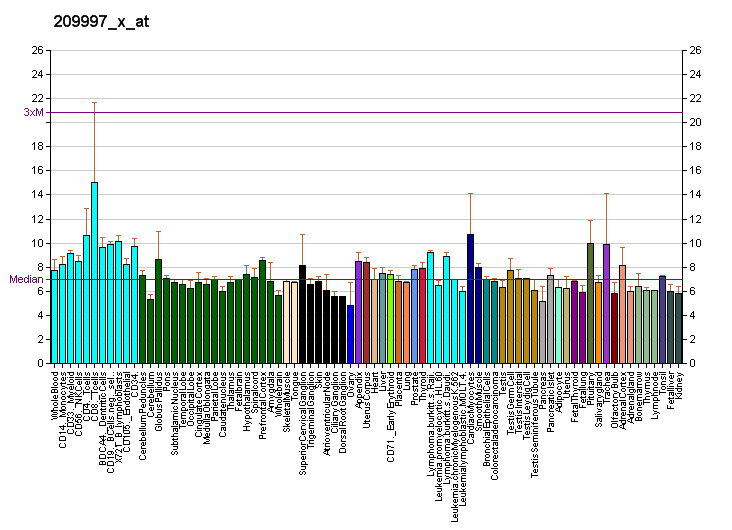

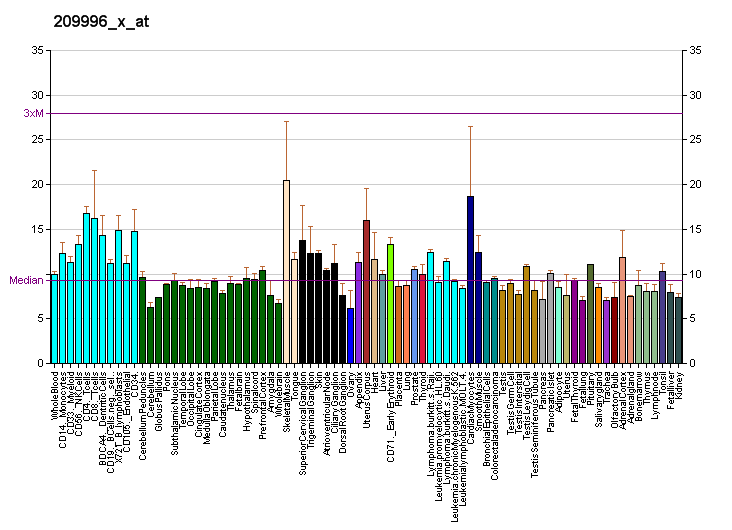
RNA expression pattern
Bgee	Human / Mouse (ortholog); n/a / Top expressed in: spermatocyte; genital tubercle; tail of embryo; saccule; ventricular zone; spermatid; otic placode; ascending aorta; zygote; otic vesicle
BioGPS	More reference expression data
Gene ontology
Molecular function	protein binding; identical protein binding
Cellular component	ciliary basal body; cell projection; nuclear membrane; membrane; microtubule organizing center; centriole; cytoskeleton; ciliary transition zone; centrosome; centriolar satellite; pericentriolar material; cytoplasm; cytosol; apical part of cell; non-motile cilium; protein-containing complex
Biological process	positive regulation of intracellular protein transport; neuron migration; neuronal stem cell population maintenance; intraciliary transport involved in cilium assembly; cell projection organization; G2/M transition of mitotic cell cycle; cytoplasmic microtubule organization; negative regulation of neurogenesis; interkinetic nuclear migration; microtubule anchoring at centrosome; protein localization to centrosome; microtubule anchoring; social behavior; cilium assembly; ciliary basal body-plasma membrane docking; non-motile cilium assembly; centrosome cycle; regulation of G2/M transition of mitotic cell cycle; protein localization to organelle
Sources:Amigo / QuickGO
Orthologs
Databases	NCBI: entry; OMA: entry
Species	Human	Mouse
Entrez	5108	18536
Ensembl	ENSG00000078674	ENSMUSG00000031592
UniProt	Q15154	Q9R0L6
RefSeq (mRNA)	NM_006197; NM_001315507; NM_001315508	NM_023662
RefSeq (protein)	NP_001302436; NP_001302437; NP_006188; NP_001339561; NP_001339562 NP_001339563; NP_001339564; NP_001339565; NP_001339566; NP_001339567; NP_001339568; NP_001339569; NP_001339570; NP_001339571; NP_001339572; NP_001339573; NP_001339574; NP_001339575; NP_001339576; NP_001339577; NP_001339578; NP_001339579; NP_001339580; NP_001339581; NP_001339582; NP_001339583; NP_001339584; NP_001339585; NP_001339586; NP_001339587; NP_001339588; NP_001339589; NP_001302436.1	NP_076151; NP_001390746; NP_001390748; NP_001390749; NP_001390752 NP_001390753; NP_001390754
Location (UCSC)	n/a	Chr 8: 41.24 – 41.33 Mb
PubMed search
- Wikidata
View/Edit Human	View/Edit Mouse

Pericentriolar material 1, also known as PCM1, is a protein which in humans is encoded by the PCM1 gene.

== Gene ==
PCM1 has four known transcripts, the longest of which has 39 exons. The open reading frame of PCM1 encodes a protein of 2024 amino acids. The protein contains coiled coil regions between areas of low complexity as well as an adenosine triphosphate (ATP) / GTPase domain, a nuclear localization domain and a eukaryotic molybdopterin domain. The eukaryotic molybdopterin binding domain is currently found in only five other human genes, xanthine dehydrogenase, sulfite oxidase (mitochondrial precursor), aldehyde oxidase, erythropoietin receptor precursor and the ATPbinding cassette, sub-family A, member 2 (ABCA2).

== Tissue distribution ==
PCM1 mRNA expression in the mouse brain has been found to be highest in the hippocampus. In humans it is expressed above the median level of central nervous system (CNS) expression in most parts of the brain.

== Function ==
The PCM1 protein was originally identified by virtue of its distinct cell cycle-dependent association with the centrosome complex and microtubules. The protein appears to associate with the centrosome complex during the cell cycle. Dissociation occurs during mitosis when PCM1 is dispersed throughout the cell. Immunolabeling studies performed found that PCM1 was present in centriolar satellites and in electron dense granules between 70 and 100 nm in diameter. These were originally thought to be scattered only around the centrosomes, but further studies proved that PCM1 was also found throughout the cytoplasm.

PCM1 was shown to be essential for cell division because PCM1 antibodies cause cell-cycle arrest when microinjected into fertilized murine eggs. Targeting of centrin, pericentrin and ninein was also dramatically reduced after PCM1 depletion using siRNA, overexpression of PCM1 deletion mutants and PCM1 antibody microinjection. As a result of this depletion, the radial organization of the microtubules was found to be disrupted, but did not appear to affect microtubule nucleation.

== Clinical significance ==
Mutations in the PCM1 gene have been shown to cause genetic susceptibility to schizophrenia. If an isoleucine amino acid change in PCM1 is inherited the risk of developing schizophrenia was found to be 68% in two independent samples from south England and Scotland. This means that it may now be possible to offer very limited genetic counselling to a small proportion of people with schizophrenia who are also carriers of this mutation.

PCM1 forms a complex at the centrosome with disrupted-in-schizophrenia 1 (DISC1) and Bardet-Biedl syndrome 4 protein (BBS4), which provides a link between aberrant PCM1 and the abnormal cortical development associated with the pathology of schizophrenia.

== Interactions ==
PCM1 has been shown to interact with PCNT.
