= Bridgette Jordan =

Smallest living woman until her death in 2019

- Born: June 9, 1989
- Died: June 12, 2019 (aged 30)
- Height: 69 cm (2 ft 3 in)

Bridgette Marie Jordan (June 9, 1989 – June 12, 2019) was one of the shortest verified women according to Guinness World Records at 2 ft 3 in (69 cm). She was also one of the shortest living siblings according to Guinness World Records; her younger brother Brad was 38 inches tall at 20 years old. The siblings were born with a rare genetic condition called Microcephalic osteodysplastic primordial dwarfism type II.

Bridgette Jordan was the smallest woman in the United States; she lived in Sandoval, Illinois and attended college at Kaskaskia College. She enjoyed dancing and cheerleading. She was on the cheer squad for Kaskaskia. She wore an infant size 2 shoe.

Jordan received the record from the previous Guinness record holder, Elif Kocaman of Kadirli, Turkey, who measured 2 feet, 4.5 inches on September 20, 2011, but then lost the record to Jyoti Amge of Nagpur, India, on December 16, 2011, when Amge turned 18. In 2012, the Jordan siblings starred in Big Tiny, a reality series on TLC.

Jordan was born weighing in at 1 pound, 12 ounces and was 12.5 inches long. Her brother Brad was born weighing 2 pounds, 4 ounces, and measured 13.5 inches long. Together, the two only reached 5 ft 5 in. Brad Jordan died on February 21, 2017, at the age of 25. Bridgette Jordan died on June 12, 2019.

== See also ==
- List of shortest people
- Shortest women
- Primordial dwarfism
- Dwarfism
