= Salyan Khalanga =

Salyān सल्यान खलङ्गा Salyān Khalangā
- Municipality
- Location in Nepal
- Coordinates: 28°22′31″N 82°9′42″E
- Country: Nepal
- Development Region: Mid-Western
- Province: Karnali Province
- District: Salyan District
- Elevation: 1,530 m (5,020 ft)
- Postal code: 22200
- Area code: 088

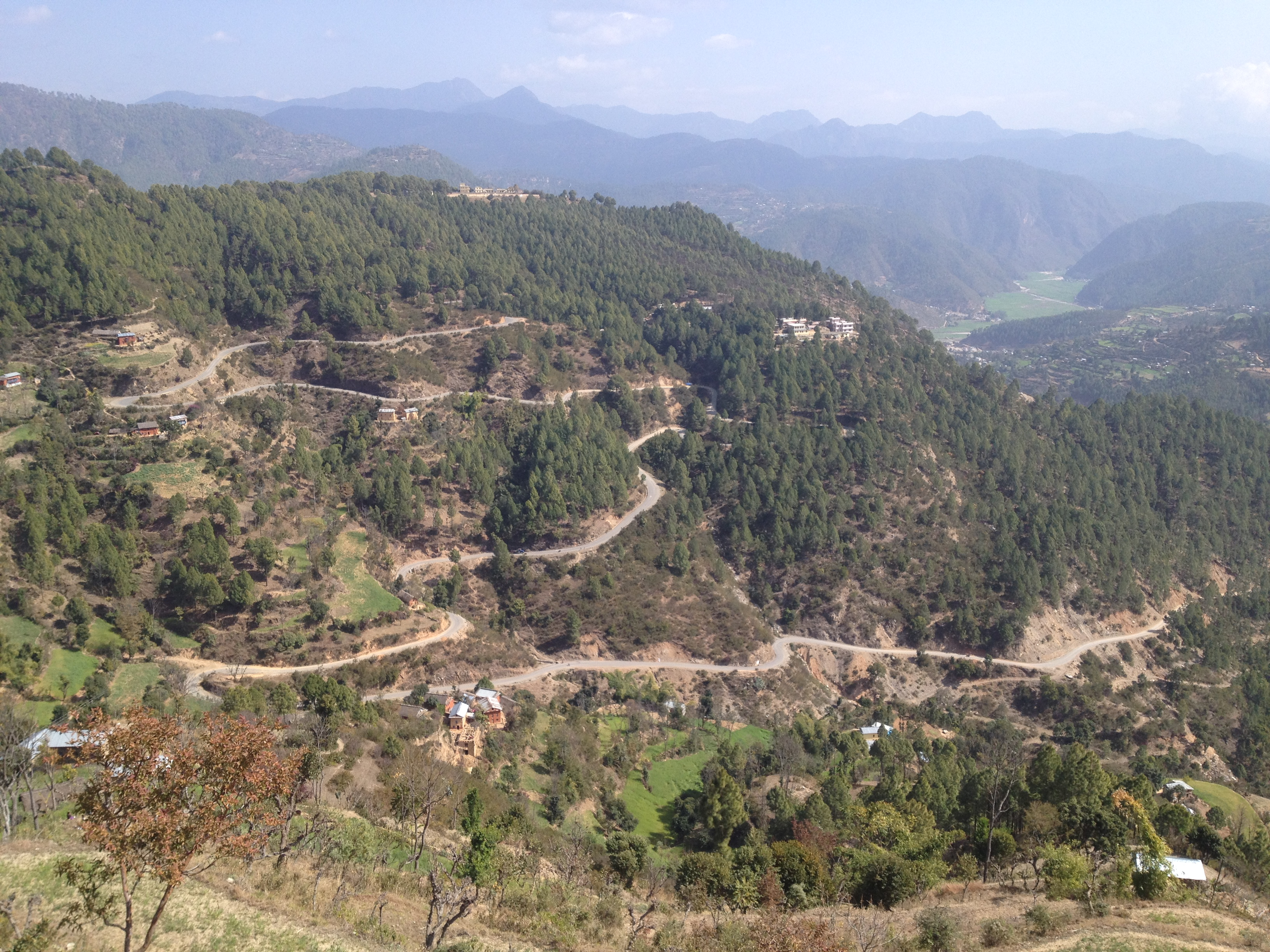

Salyan or Salyan Khalanga is the headquarters of Salyan District in the mid-west 'hills' of Nepal. It is located at 28°22'31N 82°9'42E at 1,530 metres elevation (5,020 feet).

Rapti Highway from Tulsipur follows the Sarda River 3 km. (1.9 miles) east of the town at 1,000 meters (3,280 feet) elevation. As of 2010, it was being extended north to Musikot, Rukum District. A spur road from this highway climbs up to Salyan Khalanga and the town has bus connections to Tulsipur, Ghorahi and Mahendra Highway. It is also the birthplace of Chandra Bahadur Dangi, who was known for being the shortest male ever.

== Notable people ==
- Chandra Bahadur Dangi, world's shortest adult person in recorded history
