= Aditya Dev =

Indian body builder, solder, entertainer and dancer (1988–2012)

Aditya 'Romeo' Dev
- Born: 1 November 1988; Phagwara, India
- Died: 13 September 2012 (aged 23); Jalandhar, India
- Other name: Aditya Kumar (Mitthu)
- Occupations: Body builder, entertainer, dancer
- Height: 84 cm (2 ft 9 in)

Aditya 'Romeo' Dev (1 November 1988 – 13 September 2012) was an Indian bodybuilder, entertainer and dancer with dwarfism made famous by being reported in the British press in February 2008. Romeo could shoulder press custom made 2 kg dumbbells, a notable feat given his 14 kg (31 lb) body weight and 84 cm (2 ft 9 in) height. Although it has not been published in a Guinness World Records book, in 2006 they recognized him to be the "world's smallest bodybuilder".

Romeo had a head of 38 cm (15 in) and a chest of 51 cm (20 in). He maintained his figure by working with his trainer Ranjeet Pal.

In summer of 2008, Dev was diagnosed with aneurysms which, if left untreated, are a serious threat to his life. Aneurysms and Moyamoya are common symptoms of the syndrome MOPD II, which was the cause of Dev's small stature.

He died on 13 September 2012 after a brain aneurysm rupture.
