= Jyoti Amge =

Smallest living woman (born 1993)

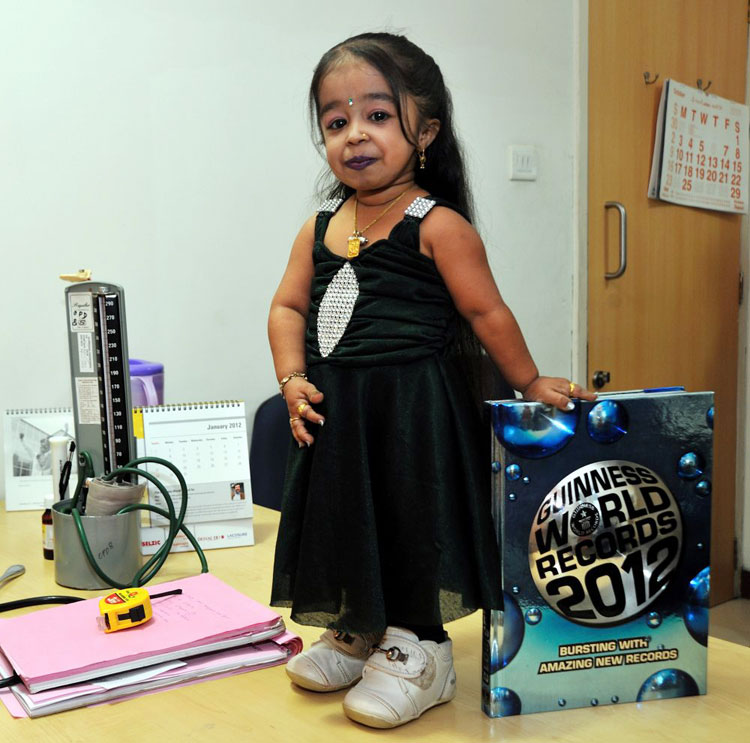
- Amge at age 18, in 2011
- Born: Jyoti Kishanji Amge; 16 December 1993 (age 32); Nagpur, Maharashtra, India
- Occupations: Model; actress
- Known for: World's shortest living woman Second shortest woman
- Height: 62.8 cm (2 ft 3/4 in)

YouTube information
- Channel: Jyoti Amge Official Guinness World Record Holder
- Years active: 2009–present
- Subscribers: 1.32 million
- Views: 713 million
- Last updated: 23 May 2026

Jyoti Kishanji Amge (born 16 December 1993) is an Indian model and actress notable for being the world's shortest living woman according to the Guinness World Records.

Following Amge's 18th birthday on 16 December 2011, she was officially declared the world's shortest living woman by Guinness World Records with a height of 62.8 centimetres (2 ft 3/4 in). Her restricted height is due to a genetic disorder called primordial dwarfism.

In 2012, she met the world's shortest man, Chandra Bahadur Dangi of Nepal. The pair posed together for the 57th edition of the Guinness World Records.

On 21 November 2024, she met Rumeysa Gelgi, the tallest living woman in the world, for the first time, at the Savoy Hotel in London, England.

== Media appearances ==
Amge, together with Teo Mammucari, co-hosted Lo show dei record in 2012 on the Italian channel Canale 5.

Amge was featured in the 2009 documentary titled Body Shock: Two Foot Tall Teen. She was also a guest participant on Bigg Boss 6.

On 13 August 2014, Amge was cast in the fourth season of American Horror Story: Freak Show where she appeared as Ma Petite which premiered 8 October 2014.

Her wax statue is at the Celebrity Wax Museum, Lonavala.

== Filmography ==
List of films and television appearances
Year	Title	Role	Notes
2009	Body Shock	Herself	Episode: "Two Foot Tall Teen"
2012–2013	Bigg Boss 6	Herself	Guest appearance
2014–2015	American Horror Story: Freak Show	Ma Petite	12 episodes
2018	Maatharam	—N/a	Short film
2020	World's Smallest Woman: Meet Jyoti	Herself	TLC network, aired in July 2020

== Social service ==
Amge participated with the Nagpur Police to urge Indian citizens to stay at home during the COVID-19 lockdown in India.

== Gallery ==
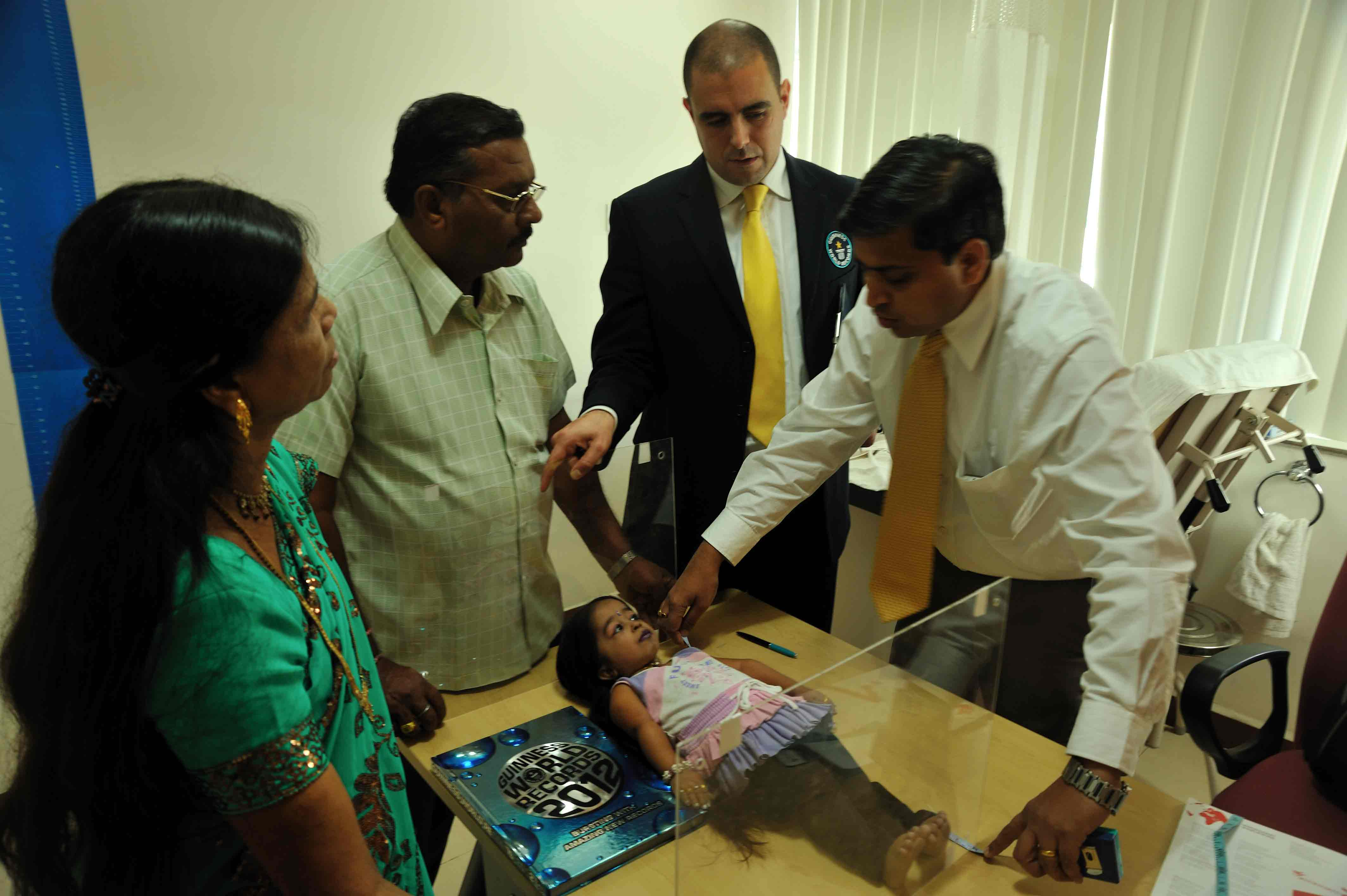
Amge being measured by Guinness World Records

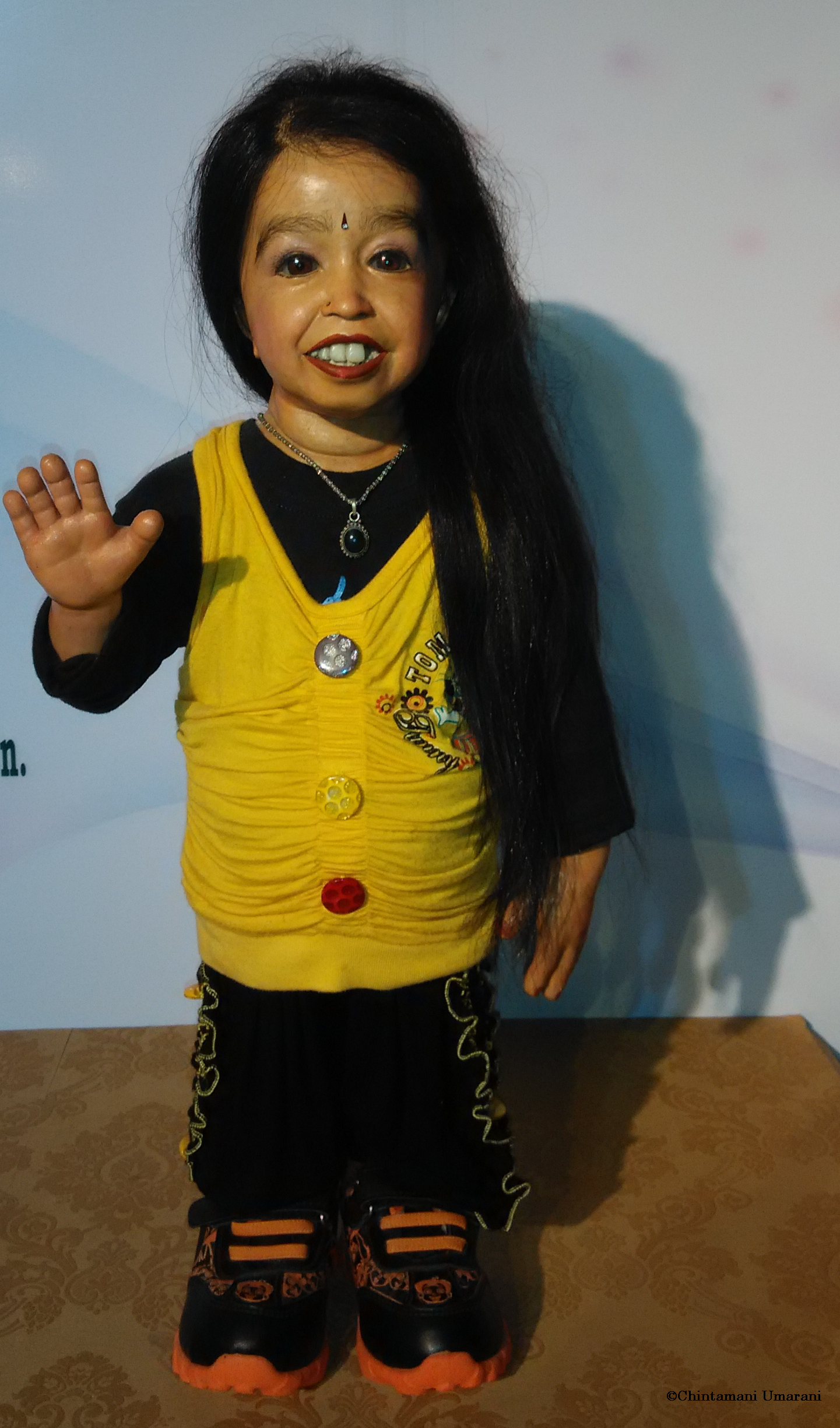
Statue of Jyoti Amge at the wax museum in Lonavala

== See also ==
- Dwarfism
- List of the verified shortest people
- List of people with dwarfism

Records
Preceded by Madge Bester	Shortest Recognized Woman; 2011–present	Current holder
