= Cyrus Edson =

American pharmacist, physician, and public health official (1857 – 1903)

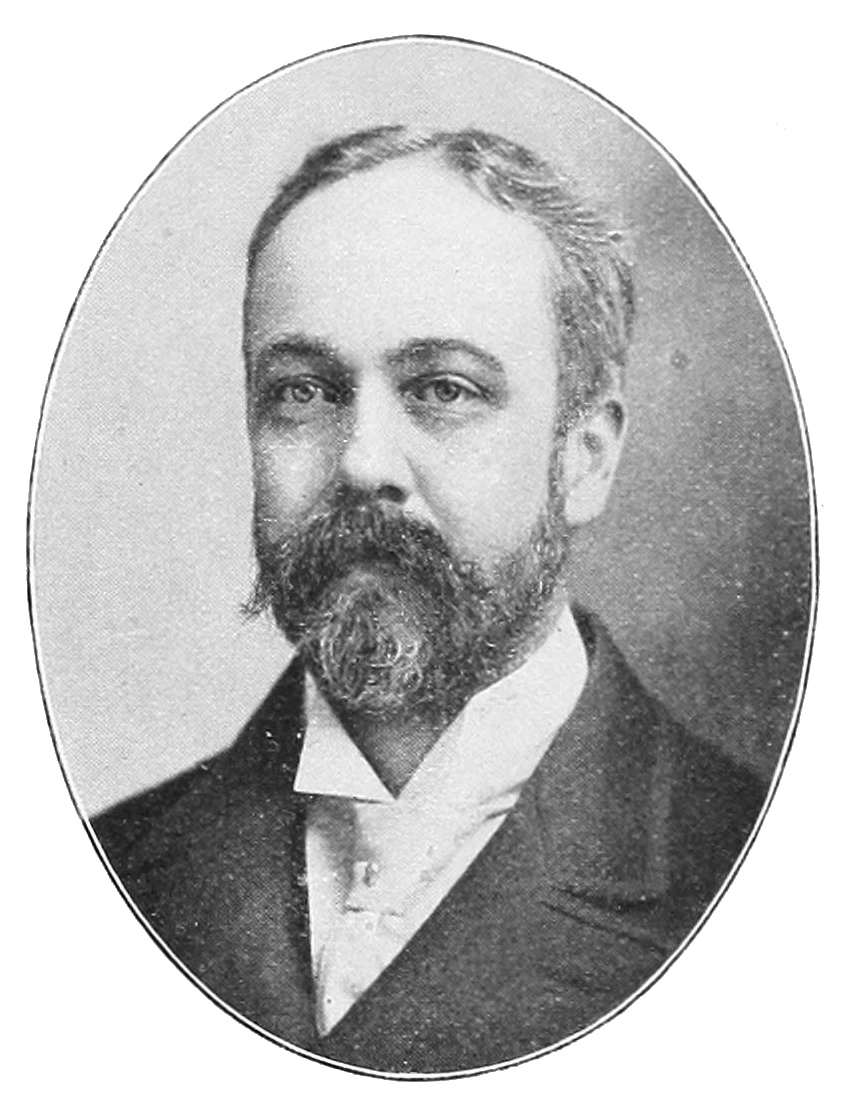
Image of Cyrus Edson

Cyrus Edson (born Albany, New York, September 8, 1857; died New York City, New York, December 2, 1903) was an American pharmacist, medical doctor, and public health official. He was known for his campaigns against adulterated drugs and infectious diseases such as tuberculosis.

== Early life ==
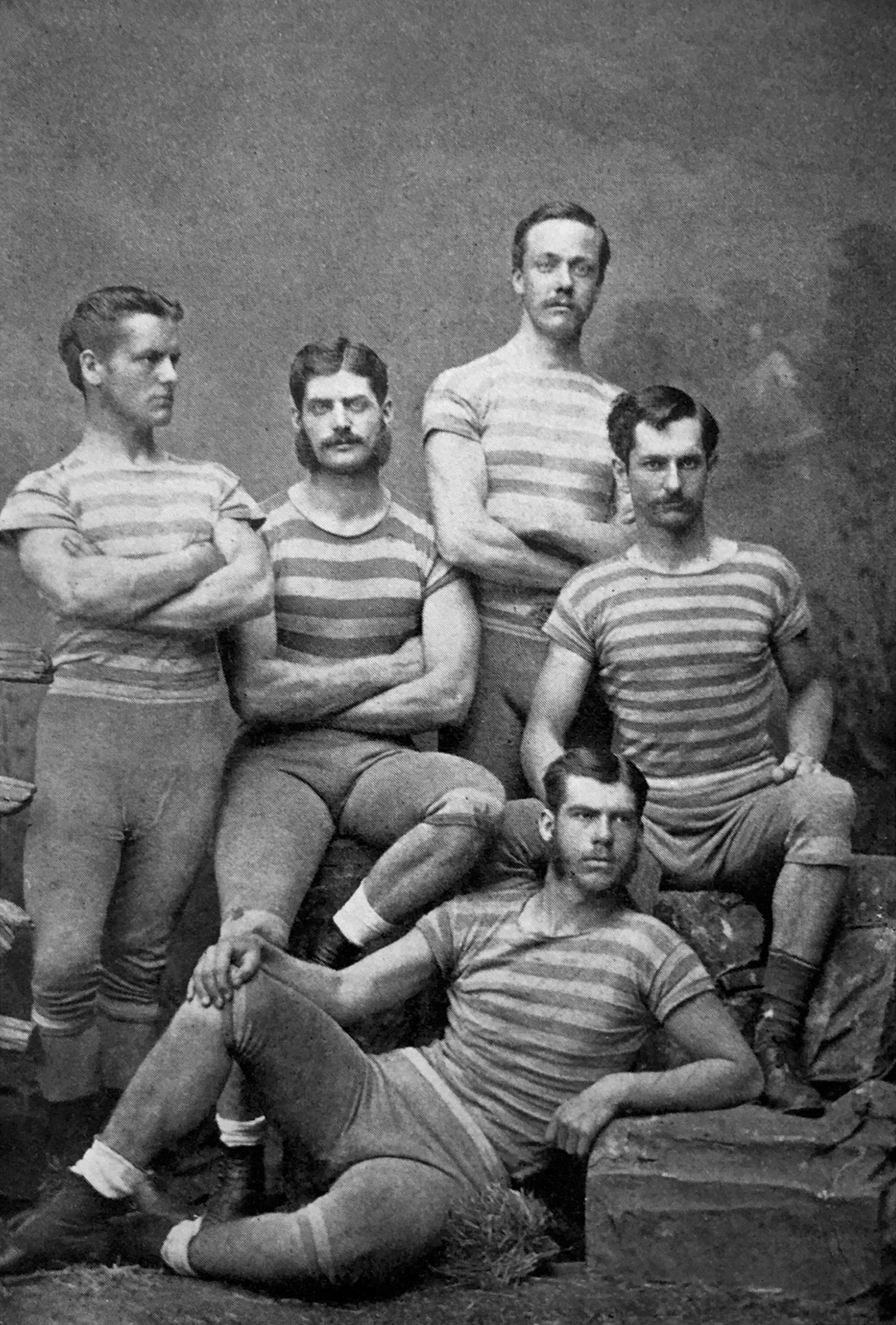
Columbia University Four, 1878. Edson is standing in the rear.

Edson was the son of Franklin Edson (1832–1904), mayor of New York City from 1883 to 1884, and his wife Frances (Wood) Edson (1835–1893). Franklin Edson moved from Albany to New York City when Cyrus was four and went into the produce business there, becoming so successful that by 1873 he was elected president of the New York Produce Exchange.

Cyrus Edson was educated at a military school in Throgg's Neck, attended Columbia University, and graduated from the Columbia University College of Physicians and Surgeons in 1881. While at Columbia Edson was part of a Columbia rowing team that won the Visitors' Challenge Cup at the Henley Royal Regatta, the first American team to win a race there. The team's ship docked in New York City on August 10, 1878; they were met with a cheering crowd and a parade through the city that led to a reception held at Delmonico's.

== Career ==
Edson served as president of the New York City Board of Pharmacy from 1893 to 1899. From 1882 to 1895 he worked for the New York City Board of Health, rising to serve from 1893 to 1895 as Health Commissioner. He campaigned against adulterated milk, candy, and drugs and also headed the Board of Contagious Diseases, where his efforts against typhus and smallpox attracted much attention.

As part of the war of the currents, Edson was recruited by electrical engineer Harold P. Brown to run a second demonstration on August 3, 1888, at Columbia University of the dangers of alternating current by electrocuting stray dogs.

In 1896 Edson published a book titled "Aseptolin: A Formulated Treatment for Tuberculosis, Septicæmia, Malaria and La Grippe, With Reports of Cases". Edson formed a company to sell this patent medicine.

== Writings ==
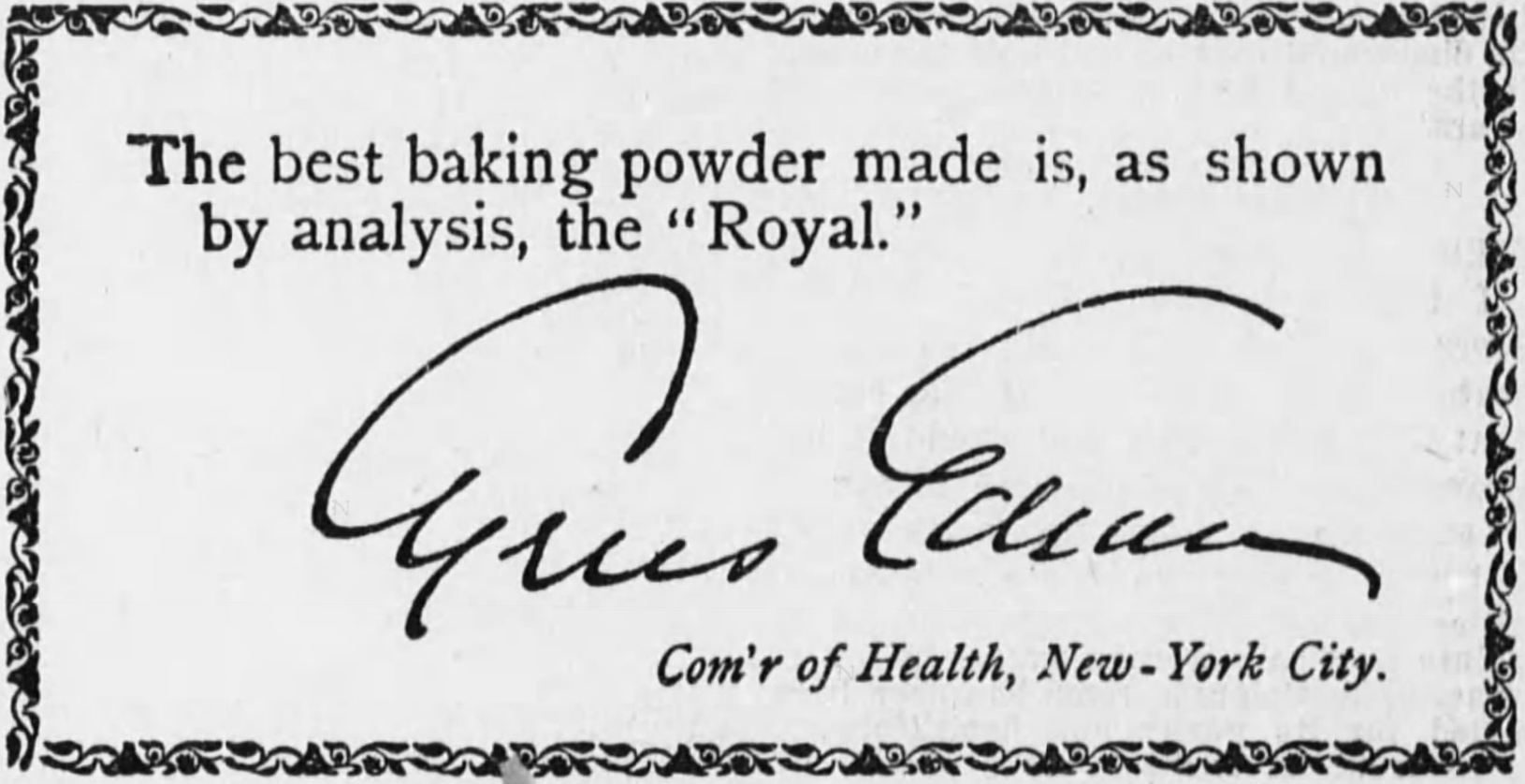
Royal Baking Powder Company newspaper advertisement with Cyrus Edson's signature

Edson wrote dozens of scientific papers and popular articles on medical subjects. He contributed an article on typhoid to Scientific American in 1889. The New York City Board of Health published pamphlets of his on "Artificial Feeding of Infants" (1891) and "La Grippe" (1893). His 1895 North American Review article "The Microbe as a Social Leveller", advancing the idea that public health affects the entire community, continues to be referenced.

Several of his articles promoted typical Victorian views on women and attracted wide attention. An 1892 article in the North American Review titled "Do We Live Too Fast?" in which he claimed that "...this American life of ours is far more wearing on women than on men." elicited a response from a prominent surgeon. Another North American Review article, "On Nagging Women" elicited a response from Lady Henry Somerset, Harriet Elizabeth Prescott Spofford, and Mary Virginia Terhune.

== Personal life ==
Edson married Virginia Churchill Paige (1853–1891); their children were Helen Augusta Sprague, Franklin Churchill Edson, Florence Edson, Ruth Lennox Renwick, and William Russell Edson. After Virginia's death he remarried to a widow, Mary E. Quick.

Edson was a friend of soldier and inventor Edmund Zalinski and took an interest in his works; he and Zalinski would reputedly go about with samples of dynamite in their pockets.
