= Chandra Bahadur Dangi =

World's shortest person (1939–2015)

- चन्द्रबहादुर डाँगी
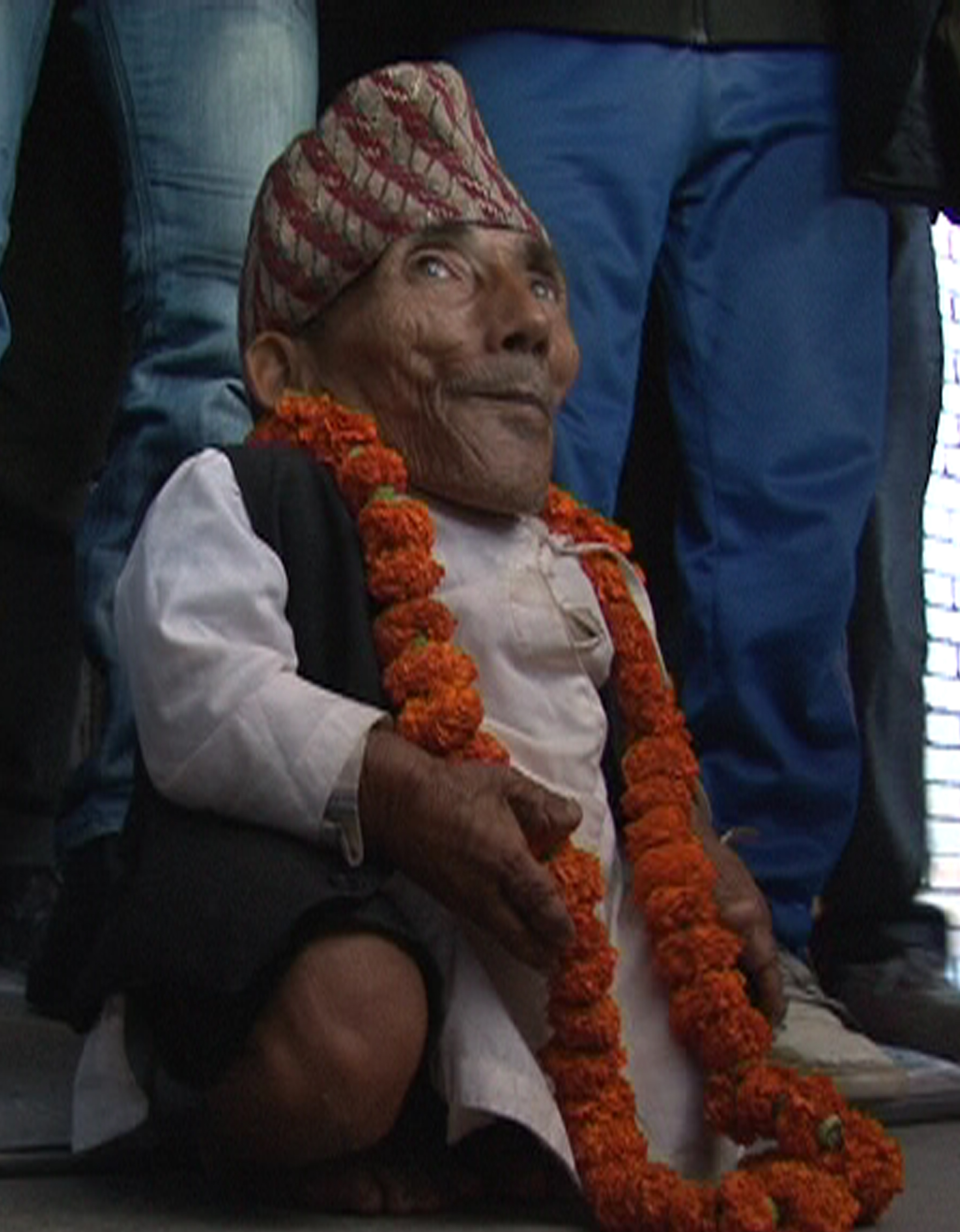
- Dangi in 2012
- Born: 30 November 1939; Salyan, Nepal
- Died: 3 September 2015 (aged 75); Pago Pago, American Samoa
- Occupations: Farmer; craftsman
- Known for: World's shortest adult human
- Height: 54.6 cm (1 ft 9 1/2 in)

Chandra Bahadur Dangi (Nepali: चन्द्रबहादुर डाँगी; 30 November 1939 – 3 September 2015) was a Nepalese man who holds the world record as the shortest person in recorded history. Measuring 54.6 cm (1 ft 9 1/2 in), he was recognized by Guinness World Records as the shortest adult human ever verified in 2012.

Dangi came to international attention after a timber contractor encountered him in his village in the Dang district of Nepal. Following the official measurements conducted in February 2012, he was awarded the title of the world's shortest adult human ever recorded. He was subsequently included in the Guinness World Records.

== Biography ==
Dangi was born in Salyan, Salyan District, Nepal, on 30 November 1939. It is said he had primordial dwarfism. He had five brothers and two sisters. Three of his five brothers were less than 1.22 m (4 ft) tall, while his sisters and two other brothers were of average height.

He lived in a remote village, Reemkholi, approximately 400 kilometres (250 mi) away from Kathmandu, Nepal's capital. Before being recognised by Guinness World Records as the world's shortest man in 2012, he had never left his home village. He was a weaver by trade. After being awarded the title, he said he had always wished to travel to all parts of his country and the world. He stated that being the shortest man in the world and a citizen of Nepal, he wanted to use his status to popularise his country.

In 2012, at the age of 72, Dangi met the world's shortest woman, Jyoti Amge of Nagpur, India. The pair posed together for the 57th edition of The Guinness Book of Records in 2013. On 13 November 2014, as part of Guinness World Records Day, Dangi met the world's tallest living man, Sultan Kösen, at an event in London.

Dangi died in American Samoa on 3 September 2015 at the age of 75, at the Lyndon B. Johnson Tropical Medical Hospital in Pago, Pago. He had been hospitalized for pneumonia. He had been touring the South Pacific for much of the year with Samoa's Tupa'l Bruno's Magic Circus. Dangi’s memorial service was attended by Lieutenant Governor Lemanu Peleti Mauga and U.S. Congresswoman Amata Coleman Radewagen among other dignitaries. He was cremated and his ashes were returned to his family in Nepal.

== See also ==
- List of people with dwarfism
- Dwarfism
- List of the verified shortest people

Preceded by Junrey Balawing	Shortest recognised person 2012–2015	Succeeded by Junrey Balawing
Preceded by Gul Mohammed	Shortest recognised adult human ever 2012–present	Succeeded by -
