= He Pingping =

World's shortest man who was able to walk

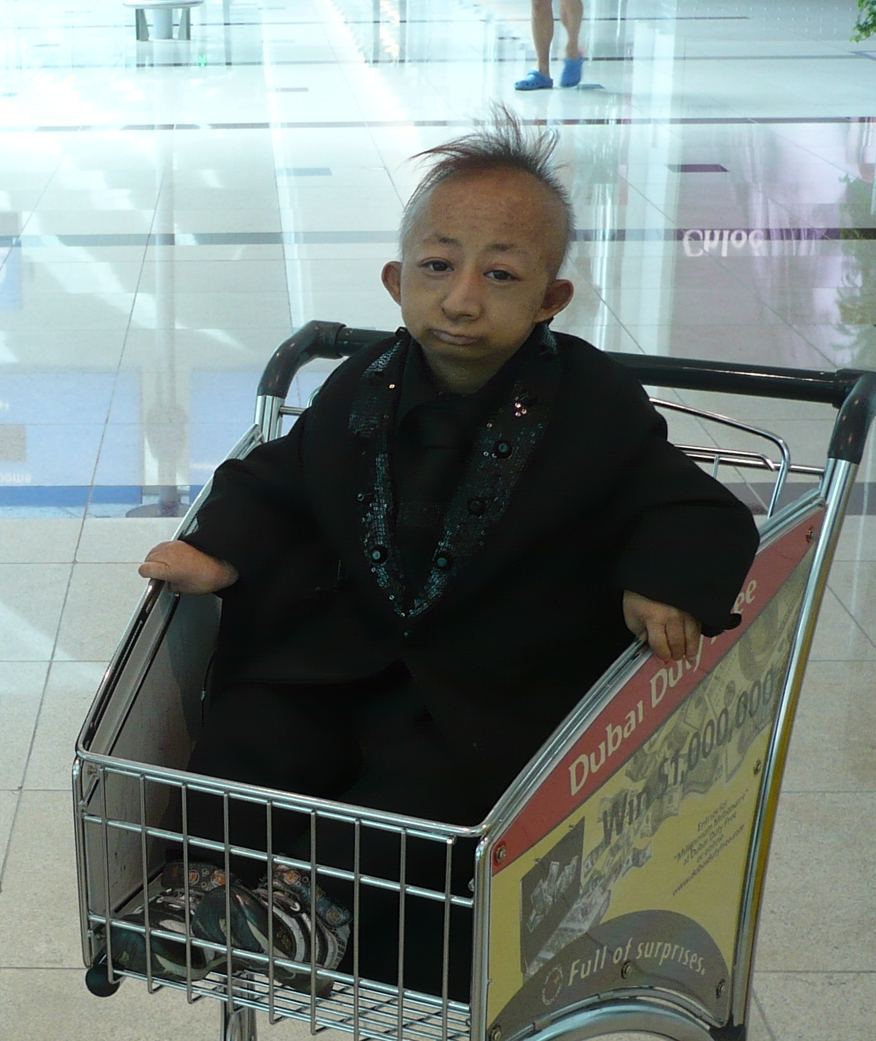
- He Pingping (1988–2010)
- Born: 13 July 1988; Ulanqab, Inner Mongolia, China
- Died: 13 March 2010 (aged 21); Rome, Lazio, Italy
- Height: 74 cm (2 ft 5 in)

He Pingping (Chinese: 何平平; pinyin: Hé Píngpíng; 13 July 1988 – 13 March 2010) was a Chinese man who, according to the Guinness World Records, was the world's shortest mobile man from 2007 until his death in March 2010.

== Early and personal life ==
Pingping measured 74 cm (2 ft 5 in) tall, and was the third child of a family in Huade county, in the city of Ulanqab in northern China's Inner Mongolia Autonomous Region. He had two sisters, both of whom developed at normal rates. At birth, Pingping was small enough to fit in the palm of his parents' hands, according to his father He Yun. When it became apparent the child was growing very slowly, doctors diagnosed the cause as the bone deformity osteogenesis imperfecta, which hinders normal bone growth and body height. Pingping was a chain smoker.

== Recognition of size ==
In January 2007, Pingping was invited to take part on a television program in Tokyo, Japan. His home of Inner Mongolia is also home to Bao Xishun, who at 2.36 metres (7 ft 9 in) tall was recognized by Guinness as the world's tallest man until September 2009. Their televised meeting in July 2007 attracted global media attention. In May 2008, Pingping appeared in the British Channel 4 documentary called The World's Smallest Man and Me, hosted by Mark Dolan. In the episode, Pingping and his family spent time with Dolan, who stayed over to celebrate Chinese New Year. In September 2008, he appeared with the world's longest-legged woman, Svetlana Pankratova, in London's Trafalgar Square, to publicize the release of the 2009 edition of the Guinness Book of World Records.

In 2006, Guinness World Records disallowed an application from a then fourteen-year-old Nepalese boy, Khagendra Thapa Magar, who measured 53 cm (1 ft 9 in), but reviewed the case once he reached 18 years of age in October 2010, when he was measured at 67 cm (2 ft 2 in).

Following Pingping's January 2007 appearance on television, his status as the world's shortest man was verified by Guinness World Records the following year. His height was measured thrice over the course of 10 hours before Pingping received a certificate officially naming him as the world's shortest man.

In September 2007, Pingping travelled to the U.S. to help launch the 2008 edition of the Guinness Book of World Records in New York City, which certified him as the world's smallest man.

On 25 April 2010, Pingping was featured in the tenth episode of the 16th season of the American reality show The Amazing Race, filmed earlier in Shanghai. The episode was dedicated in his memory.

== Death ==
Pingping was admitted to a hospital on 3 March 2010 in Rome, after complaining of chest pains. He had been filming Lo show dei record. Pingping died 10 days later on 13 March 2010 of heart complications; he was only 21 years old. The Guinness World Records editor-in-chief, Craig Glenday, said that Pingping was "an inspiration to anyone considered different or unusual."

== See also ==
- List of shortest people
- Edward Niño Hernández – a Colombian man who was named the world's shortest mobile man after Pingping's death
