= Khagendra Thapa Magar =

World's shortest man (1992–2020)

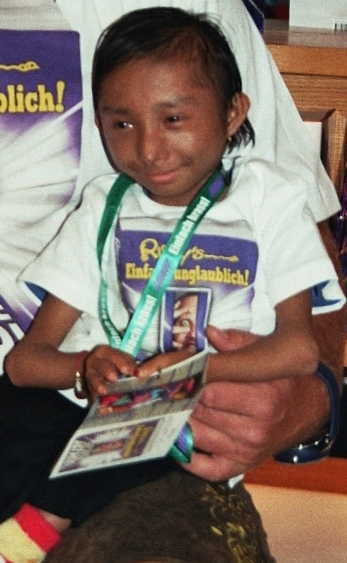
- Magar in 2011
- Born: 4 October 1992; Baglung District, Nepal
- Died: 17 January 2020 (aged 27); Pokhara, Nepal
- Known for: Formerly being the world's shortest living man
- Height: 0.67 m (2 ft 2 in)

Khagendra Thapa Magar (Nepali: खगेन्द्र थापामगर) (4 October 1992 – 17 January 2020) was a Nepali once known as the shortest man in the world, measuring 0.67 m (2 ft 2 in). Magar, who was a primordial dwarf, won the title of shortest man from Edward Niño Hernández. He lost the title in June 2011 to Junrey Balawing of the Philippines.

== Biography ==
Born on 18 Asoj in the Nepali calendar, or 4 October 1992, he was from the Baglung District of Nepal. Just 600 grams (21 oz) at birth, he weighed 6.5 kilograms (14 lb; 1.02 st). In May 2008, Khagendra appeared in the British Channel 4 documentary called The World's Smallest Man and Me hosted by Mark Dolan.

Magar died in a Pokhara hospital on 17 January 2020 after complications from pneumonia at the age of 27.

== See also ==
- List of the verified shortest people
- List of people with dwarfism
- List of world records from Nepal
- Malati Rishidev - Shortest woman in Nepal
