= Afshin Esmaeil Ghaderzadeh =

Shortest living man

- Born: 13 July 2002 (age 23); Bukan, Iran
- Known for: Shortest living man
- Height: 65.24 cm (2 ft 1 1/2 in)

Afshin Ghaderzadeh (Persian: افشین قادرزاده; Kurdish: ئەفشین قادرزادە, romanized: Efşîn Qadirzade; born 13 July 2002) is an Iranian Kurdish Internet personality who is the shortest living man in the world. He was recognized by the Guinness World Records in December 2022. He has dimensions of measuring 65.24 centimetres (25.69 in), which is 7 centimetres (2.8 in) less than the previous person.

Ghaderzadeh also holds the Guinness World Record for the smallest hands on a living person.

== Biography ==
Ghaderzadeh was born on 13 July 2002 to a Kurdish family in Bukan, Iran. He stopped studying because of his physical condition, but with the support provided by Iranian National Records Registration Committee, he was able to record the national record of the smallest living man in Iran and then the world record of the smallest living man in the world.

In 2023, it was announced he would play the lead in an Iraqi Kurdish film called iPhone 14.
