= Gul Mohammed =

Indian man who was the shortest adult human (1957–1997)

- गुल मोहम्मद
- Born: February 15, 1957; New Delhi, India
- Died: October 1, 1997 (aged 40); New Delhi, India
- Known for: Former shortest verified adult human being (1990–2011)
- Height: 57 cm (1 ft 10 7/16 in)

Gul Mohammed (February 15, 1957 – October 1, 1997) was an Indian man who, according to Guinness World Records, was the shortest adult human being of his time whose existence and height have been independently verified.

On July 19, 1990, he was examined by Ram Manohar Lohia Hospital, New Delhi, India, and he stood 1 foot 10.5 inches (57 cm) tall and weighed 37.5 lbs (17 kg). He died on October 1, 1997, from respiratory complications and after a long struggle with asthma and bronchitis. His record was broken by Chandra Bahadur Dangi of Nepal whose height was just 21.5 inches (54.6 cm).

Preceded by Pauline Musters	Shortest Recognized adult human ever 1990-2011	Succeeded by Chandra Bahadur Dangi

== See also ==
- List of shortest people
