= Francis Joseph Flynn =

American showman

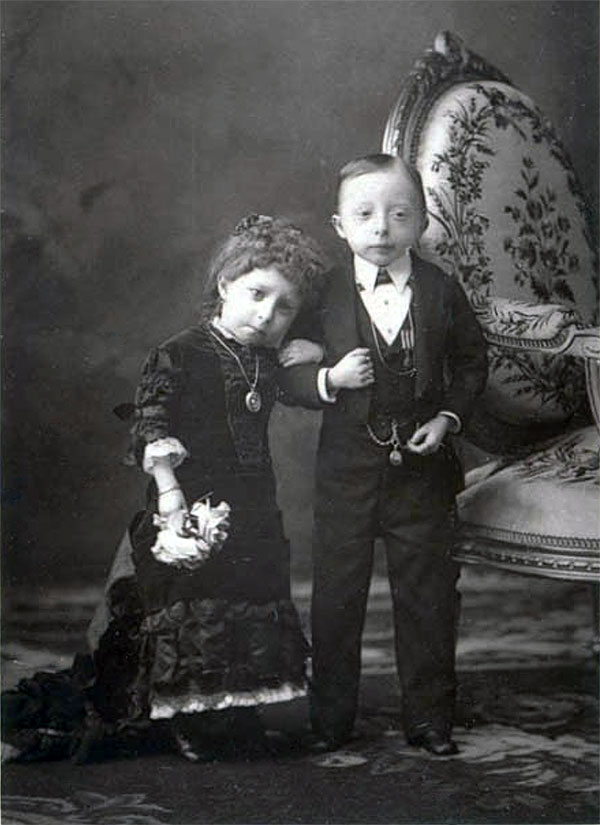
- Flynn with wife Millie Edwards
- Born: October 6, 1864; Greene, New York, U.S.
- Died: October 5, 1898 (aged 33); Broken Hill, New South Wales, Australia
- Other names: General Mite
- Occupation: Showman
- Height: 21 in (53 cm) (age 16)
- Spouse: Emily "Millie" Edwards

Francis Joseph Flynn (6 October 1864 – 5 October 1898), better known as General Mite, was an American dwarf who performed as a showman at various competitions around the world.

Flynn was born on 6 October 1864 in Greene, New York, the son of Edward Finnion Flynn and Mary Ann Flynn and brother to Alice Flynn. They were of average height.

In 1884, Flynn married an English dwarf, Millie Edwards, in England. The wedding was widely publicized and attended. From then on, the couple were exhibited as the "Royal American Midgets" and "General and Mrs. Mite" in many advertisements.

In 1890, Flynn and Edwards moved to Australia. Flynn died in Broken Hill, New South Wales on 5 October 1898, one day before his 34th birthday.
