= Anthropometry =

Measurement of the human individual

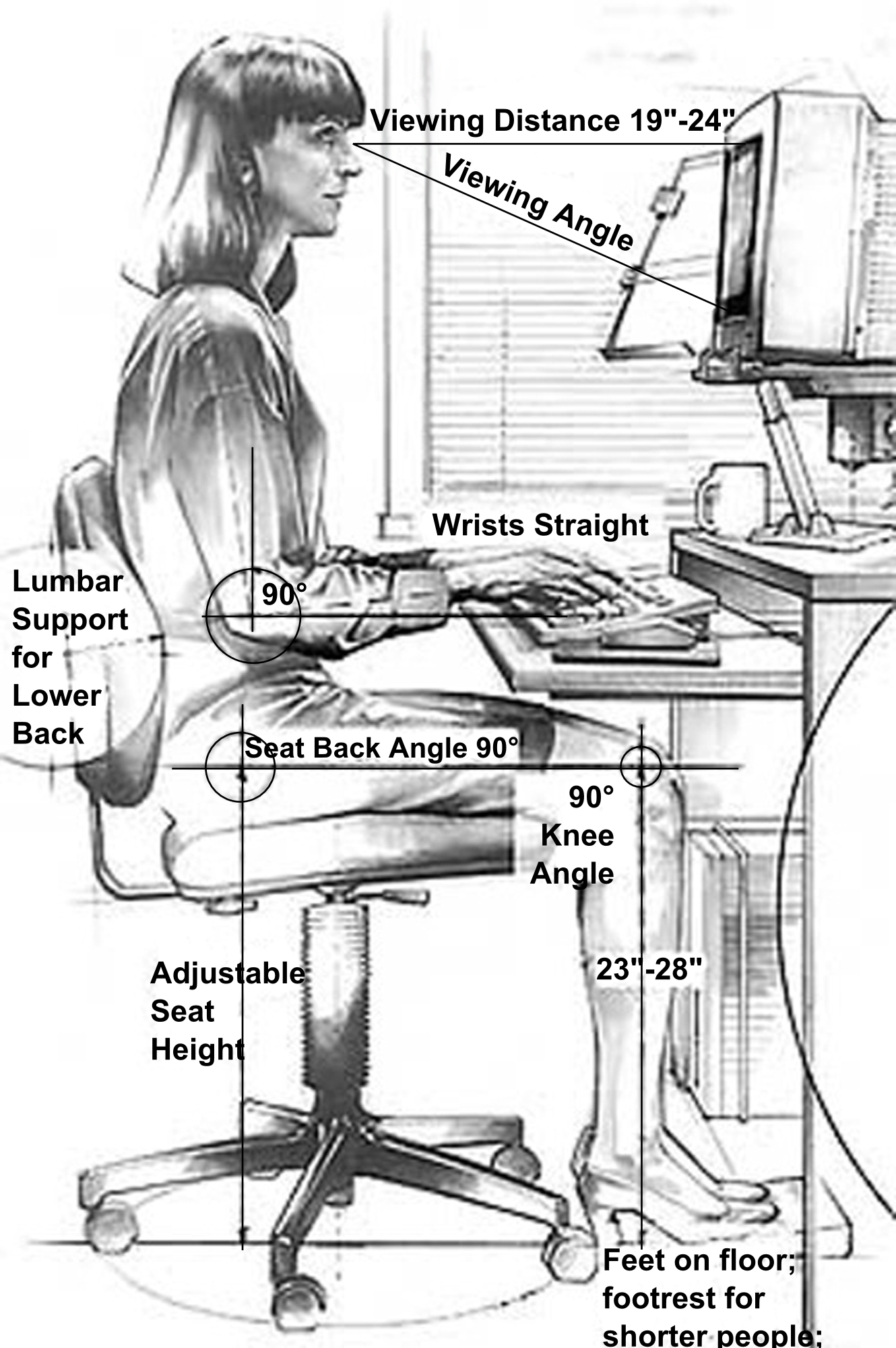
The field of ergonomics employs anthropometry to optimize human interaction with equipment and workplaces.

Anthropometry (/ænθrəˈpɒmɪtrɪ/, from Ancient Greek ἄνθρωπος (ánthrōpos) 'human' and μέτρον (métron) 'measure') refers to the measurement of the human individual. An early tool of physical anthropology, it has been used for identification, for the purposes of understanding physical human variation, in paleoanthropology and in various attempts to correlate physical with racial and psychological traits. Anthropometry involves the systematic measurement of the physical properties of the human body, primarily dimensional descriptors of body size and shape.

Since commonly used methods and approaches in analysing living standards were not helpful enough, the anthropometric history became very useful for historians in answering questions that interested them.

Today, anthropometry plays an important role in industrial design, clothing design, ergonomics and architecture where statistical data about the distribution of body dimensions in the population are used to optimize products. Changes in lifestyles, nutrition, and ethnic composition of populations lead to changes in the distribution of body dimensions (e.g. the rise in obesity) and require regular updating of anthropometric data collections.

== History ==
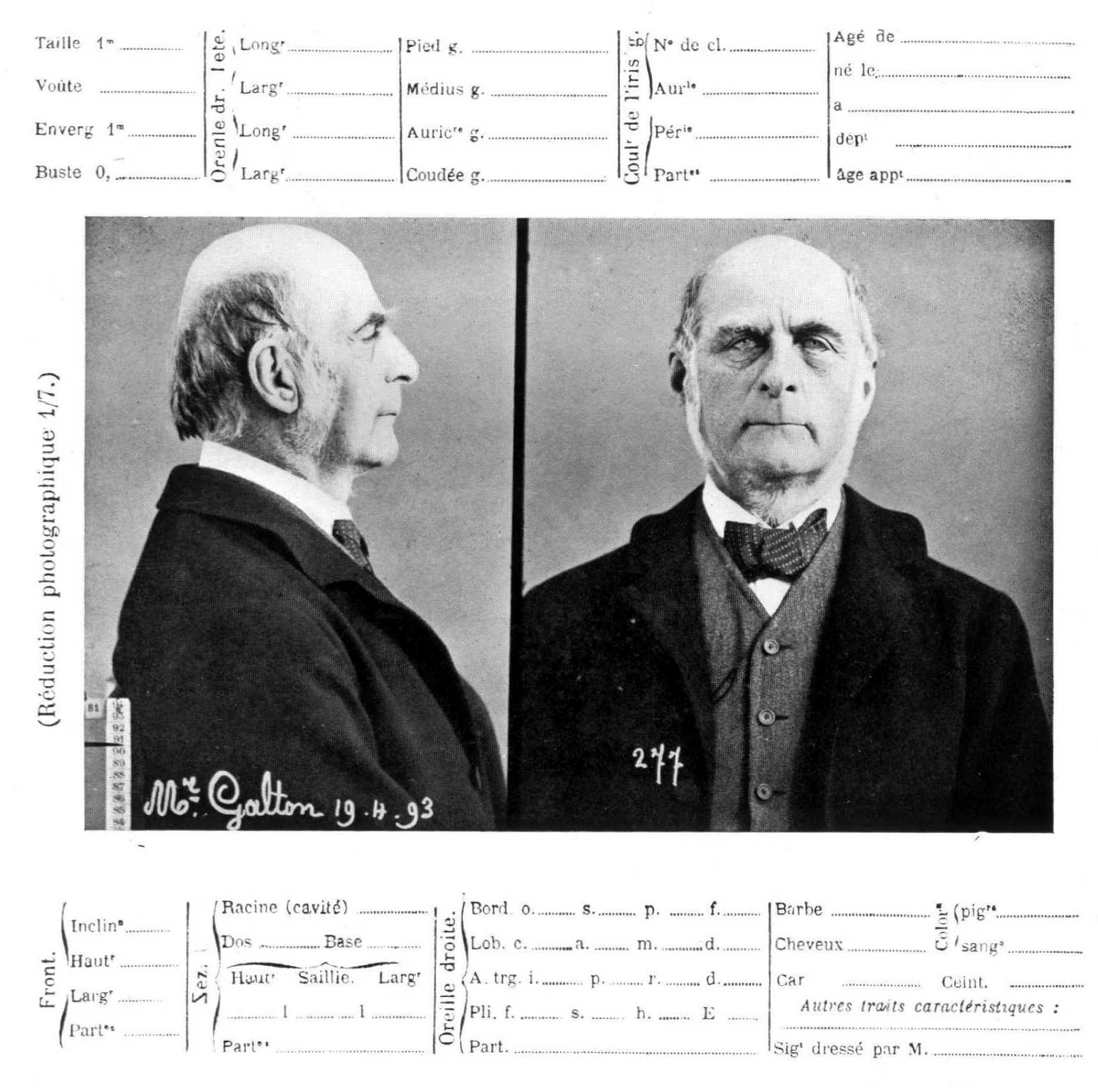
A Bertillon record for Francis Galton, from a visit to Bertillon's laboratory in 1893

The history of anthropometry includes and spans various concepts, both scientific and pseudoscientific, such as craniometry, paleoanthropology, biological anthropology, phrenology, physiognomy, forensics, criminology, phylogeography, human origins, and cranio-facial description, as well as correlations between various anthropometrics and personal identity, mental typology, personality, cranial vault and brain size, and other factors.

At various times in history, applications of anthropometry have ranged from accurate scientific description and epidemiological analysis to rationales for eugenics and overtly racist social movements. One of its misuses was the discredited pseudoscience, phrenology.

== Individual variation ==
=== Auxologic ===
Auxologic is a broad term covering the study of all aspects of human physical growth.

==== Height ====
Human height varies greatly between individuals and across populations for a variety of complex biological, genetic, and environmental factors, among others. Due to methodological and practical problems, its measurement is also subject to considerable error in statistical sampling.

The average height in genetically and environmentally homogeneous populations is often proportional across a large number of individuals. Exceptional height variation (around 20% deviation from a population's average) within such a population is sometimes due to gigantism or dwarfism, which are caused by specific genes or endocrine abnormalities. Considerable variation occurs between even the most 'common' bodies (66% of the population), and as such no person can be considered 'average'.

In the most extreme population comparisons, for example, the average female height in Bolivia is 142.2 cm (4 ft 8.0 in) while the average male height in the Dinaric Alps is 185.6 cm (6 ft 1.1 in), an average difference of 43.4 cm (1 ft 5.1 in). Similarly, the shortest and tallest of individuals, Chandra Bahadur Dangi and Robert Wadlow, have ranged from 53–272 cm (1 ft 9 in – 8 ft 11 in), respectively.

The age range where most females stop growing is 15–18 years and the age range where most males stop growing is 18–21 years.

==== Weight ====
Human weight varies extensively both individually and across populations, with the most extreme documented examples of adults being Lucia Zarate who weighed 2.1 kg (4.7 lb), and Jon Brower Minnoch who weighed 640 kg (1,400 lb), and with population extremes ranging from 49.6 kg (109.3 lb) in Bangladesh to 87.4 kg (192.7 lb) in Micronesia.

==== Organs ====
Adult brain size varies from 974.9 cm^{3} (59.49 cu in) to 1,498.1 cm^{3} (91.42 cu in) in females and 1,052.9 cm^{3} (64.25 cu in) to 1,498.5 cm^{3} (91.44 cu in) in males, with the average being 1,130 cm^{3} (69 cu in) and 1,260 cm^{3} (77 cu in), respectively. The right cerebral hemisphere is typically larger than the left, whereas the cerebellar hemispheres are typically of more similar size.

Size of the human stomach varies significantly in adults, with one study showing volumes ranging from 520 cm^{3} (32 cu in) to 1,536 cm^{3} (93.7 cu in) and weights ranging from 77 grams (2.7 oz) to 453 grams (16.0 oz).

Male and female genitalia exhibit considerable individual variation, with penis size differing substantially and vaginal size differing significantly in healthy adults.

=== Aesthetic ===
Human beauty and physical attractiveness have been preoccupations throughout history which often intersect with anthropometric standards. Cosmetology, facial symmetry, and waist–hip ratio are three such examples where measurements are commonly thought to be fundamental.

== Evolutionary science ==
Anthropometric studies today are conducted to investigate the evolutionary significance of differences in body proportion between populations whose ancestors lived in different environments. Human populations exhibit climatic variation patterns similar to those of other large-bodied mammals, following Bergmann's rule, which states that individuals in cold climates will tend to be larger than ones in warm climates, and Allen's rule, which states that individuals in cold climates will tend to have shorter, stubbier limbs than those in warm climates.

On a microevolutionary level, anthropologists use anthropometric variation to reconstruct small-scale population history. For instance, John Relethford's studies of early 20th-century anthropometric data from Ireland show that the geographical patterning of body proportions still exhibits traces of the invasions by the English and Norse centuries ago.

Similarly, anthropometric indices, namely comparison of the human stature was used to illustrate anthropometric trends. This study was conducted by Jörg Baten and Sandew Hira and was based on the anthropological founds that human height is predetermined by the quality of the nutrition, which used to be higher in the more developed countries. The research was based on the datasets for Southern Chinese contract migrants who were sent to Suriname and Indonesia and included 13,000 individuals.

== Measuring instruments ==
=== 3D body scanners ===
Today anthropometry can be performed with three-dimensional scanners. A global collaborative study to examine the uses of three-dimensional scanners for health care was launched in March 2007. The Body Benchmark Study will investigate the use of three-dimensional scanners to calculate volumes and segmental volumes of an individual body scan. The aim is to establish whether the Body Volume Index has the potential to be used as a long-term computer-based anthropometric measurement for health care. In 2001 the UK conducted the largest sizing survey to date using scanners. Since then several national surveys have followed in the UK's pioneering steps, notably SizeUSA, SizeMexico, and SizeThailand, the latter still ongoing. SizeUK showed that the nation had become taller and heavier but not as much as expected. Since 1951, when the last women's survey had taken place, the average weight for women had gone up from 62 to 65 kg. However, recent research has shown that posture of the participant significantly influences the measurements taken, the precision of 3D body scanner may or may not be high enough for industry tolerances, and measurements taken may or may not be relevant to all applications (e.g. garment construction).

=== Baropodographic ===
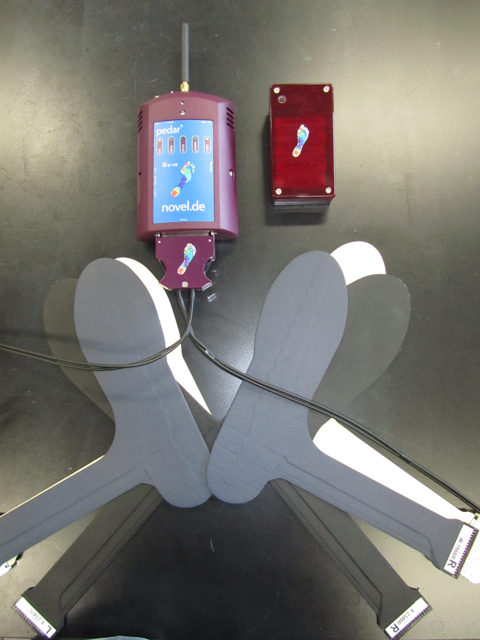
Example insole (in-shoe) foot pressure measurement device

Baropodographic devices fall into two main categories: (i) floor-based, and (ii) in-shoe. The underlying technology is diverse, ranging from piezoelectric sensor arrays to light refraction, but the ultimate form of the data generated by all modern technologies is either a 2D image or a 2D image time series of the pressures acting under the plantar surface of the foot. From these data other variables may be calculated (see data analysis.)

The spatial and temporal resolutions of the images generated by commercial pedobarographic systems range from approximately 3 to 10 mm and 25 to 500 Hz, respectively. Sensor technology limits finer resolution. Such resolutions yield a contact area of approximately 500 sensors (for a typical adult human foot with surface area of approximately 100 cm^{2}). For a stance phase duration of approximately 0.6 seconds during normal walking, approximately 150,000 pressure values, depending on the hardware specifications, are recorded for each step.

=== Neuroimaging ===
Direct measurements involve examinations of brains from corpses, or more recently, imaging techniques such as MRI, which can be used on living persons. Such measurements are used in research on neuroscience and intelligence. Brain volume data and other craniometric data are used in mainstream science to compare modern-day animal species and to analyze the evolution of the human species in archeology.

== Epidemiology and medical anthropology ==
Anthropometric measurements also have uses in epidemiology and medical anthropology, for example in helping to determine the relationship between various body measurements (height, weight, percentage body fat, etc.) and medical outcomes. Anthropometric measurements are frequently used to diagnose malnutrition in resource-poor clinical settings.

== Forensics and criminology ==
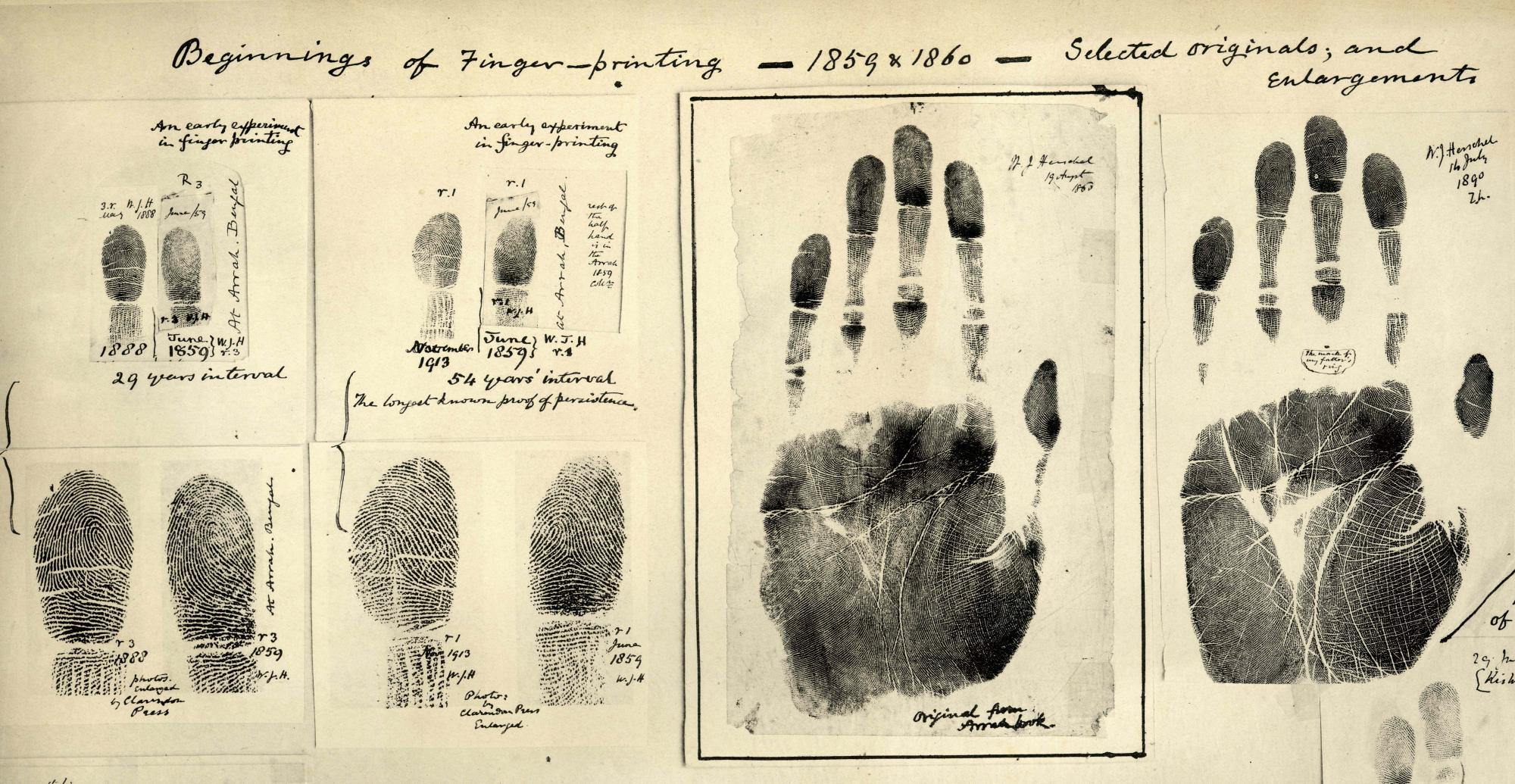
An early set of finger- and handprints by Sir William Herschel, 2nd Baronet (1833–1917)

Forensic anthropologists study the human skeleton in a legal setting. A forensic anthropologist can assist in the identification of a decedent through various skeletal analyses that produce a biological profile. Forensic anthropologists use the Fordisc program to help in the interpretation of craniofacial measurements in regards to ancestry determination.

One part of a biological profile is a person's ancestral affinity. People with significant European or Middle Eastern ancestry generally have little to no prognathism; a relatively long and narrow face; a prominent brow ridge that protrudes forward from the forehead; a narrow, tear-shaped nasal cavity; a "silled" nasal aperture; tower-shaped nasal bones; a triangular-shaped palate; and an angular and sloping eye orbit shape. People with considerable African ancestry typically have a broad and round nasal cavity; no dam or nasal sill; Quonset hut-shaped nasal bones; notable facial projection in the jaw and mouth area (prognathism); a rectangular-shaped palate; and a square or rectangular eye orbit shape. A relatively small prognathism often characterizes people with considerable East Asian ancestry; no nasal sill or dam; an oval-shaped nasal cavity; tent-shaped nasal bones; a horseshoe-shaped palate; and a rounded and non-sloping eye orbit shape. Many of these characteristics are only a matter of frequency among those of particular ancestries: their presence or absence of one or more does not automatically classify an individual into an ancestral group.

== Ergonomics ==
Ergonomics professionals apply an understanding of human factors to the design of equipment, systems and working methods to improve comfort, health, safety, and productivity. This includes physical ergonomics in relation to human anatomy, physiological and bio mechanical characteristics; cognitive ergonomics in relation to perception, memory, reasoning, motor response including human–computer interaction, mental workloads, decision making, skilled performance, human reliability, work stress, training, and user experiences; organizational ergonomics in relation to metrics of communication, crew resource management, work design, schedules, teamwork, participation, community, cooperative work, new work programs, virtual organizations, and telework; environmental ergonomics in relation to human metrics affected by climate, temperature, pressure, vibration, and light; visual ergonomics; and others.

== Biometrics ==
Iris recognition system based on pattern matching

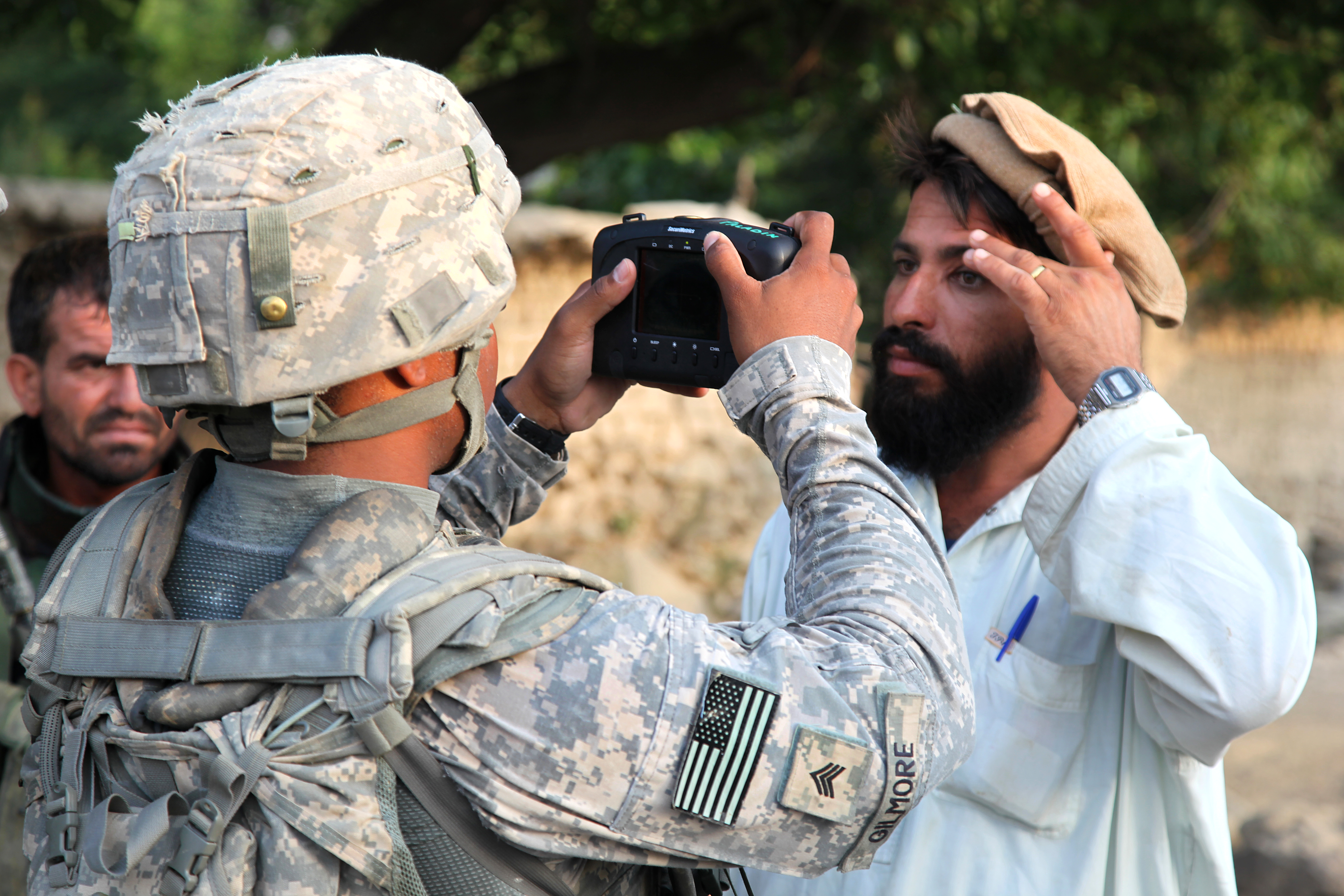
2009 photo showing a man having a retinal scan taken by a U.S. Army soldier

Biometrics refers to the identification of humans by their characteristics or traits. Biometrics is used in computer science as a form of identification and access control. It is also used to identify individuals in groups that are under surveillance. Biometric identifiers are the distinctive, measurable characteristics used to label and describe individuals. Biometric identifiers are often categorized as physiological versus behavioral characteristics. Subclasses include dermatoglyphics and soft biometrics.

== United States military research ==
The US Military has conducted over 40 anthropometric surveys of U.S. Military personnel between 1945 and 1988, including the 1988 Army Anthropometric Survey (ANSUR) of men and women with its 240 measures. Statistical data from these surveys encompasses over 75,000 individuals.

== Civilian American and European Surface Anthropometry Resource Project ==
CAESAR began in 1997 as a partnership between government (represented by the US Air Force and NATO) and industry (represented by SAE International) to collect and organize the most extensive sampling of consumer body measurements for comparison.

The project collected and organized data on 2,400 U.S. & Canadian and 2,000 European civilians and a database was developed. This database records the anthropometric variability of men and women, aged 18–65, of various weights, ethnic groups, gender, geographic regions, and socio-economic status. The study was conducted from April 1998 to early 2000 and included three scans per person in a standing pose, full-coverage pose and relaxed seating pose.

Data collection methods were standardized and documented so that the database can be consistently expanded and updated. High-resolution measurements of body surfaces were made using 3D Surface Anthropometry. This technology can capture hundreds of thousands of points in three dimensions on the human body surface in a few seconds. It has many advantages over the old measurement system using tape measures, anthropometers, and other similar instruments. It provides detail about the surface shape as well as 3D locations of measurements relative to each other and enables easy transfer to Computer-Aided Design (CAD) or Manufacturing (CAM) tools. The resulting scan is independent of the measurer, making it easier to standardize. Automatic landmark recognition (ALR) technology was used to extract anatomical landmarks from the 3D body scans automatically. Eighty landmarks were placed on each subject. More than 100 univariate measures were provided, over 60 from the scan and approximately 40 using traditional measurements.

Demographic data such as age, ethnic group, gender, geographic region, education level, and present occupation, family income and more were also captured.

== Fashion design ==
Scientists working for private companies and government agencies conduct anthropometric studies to determine a range of sizes for clothing and other items. For just one instance, measurements of the foot are used in the manufacture and sale of footwear: measurement devices may be used either to determine a retail shoe size directly (e.g. the Brannock Device) or to determine the detailed dimensions of the foot for custom manufacture (e.g. ALINEr).

== See also ==
- Allometry – Study of the relationship of body size to shape, anatomy, physiology, and behavior
- Anthropometric cosmetology – Medical practice to correct deformity
- Biometrics – Metrics related to human characteristics
- Body shape – General shape of a human body
  - Body proportions – Proportions of the human body in art
    - Artistic canons of body proportions – Criteria used in formal figurative art
  - Body mass index – Relative weight based on mass and height
  - Body roundness index – Body scale based on waist circumference and height
  - Waist-to-height ratio – Measure of the distribution of body fat
  - Waist-hip ratio – Waist measurement divided by hip measurement
- Cephalometry – Study and measurement of the head
- Chironomia – Art of hand gesturing in speech
- Craniometry – Measurement of the human cranium
- Dermatoglyphics – Scientific study of finger- and toeprints
- Digit ratio – Ratio of lengths of fingers
- Eigenface – Set of eigenvectors used in the computer vision problem of human face recognition
- Genetic fingerprinting, also known as DNA profiling – Technique used to identify individuals via DNA characteristics
- Guidonian hand – Medieval mnemonic device for choral singers
- Human height – Aspect of human growth
- Human body weight – Person's mass or weight
- Kinanthropometry – Study of human growth and performance
- Morphometrics – Quantitative study of size and shape
- Osteometry – Study and measurement of the skeleton
- Palmistry – Foretelling the future through the study of the palm
- Phrenology – Pseudoscientific study of human skull shape
- Physiognomy – Pseudoscience of face reading
- Reflexology – Alternative medical practice involving pressure to parts of the body
- Samuel George Morton – American physician, naturalist, and writer (1799–1851)
- Single transverse palmar crease – Crease across the palm of the hand
- Statistical shape analysis – Analysis of geometric properties
- World Engineering Anthropometry Resource – International not-for-profit group
