= Sports science =

Interdisciplinary study of physical activity

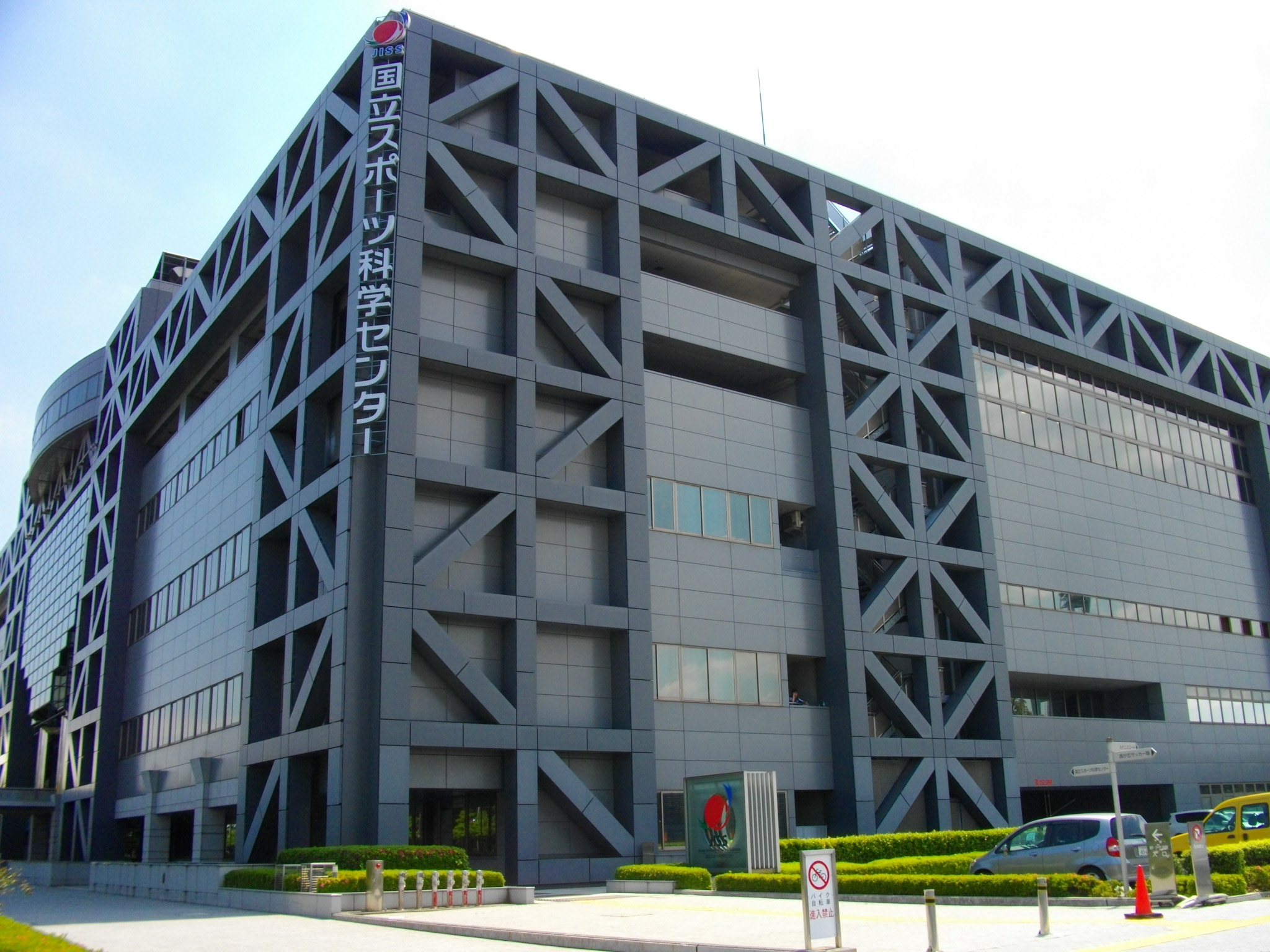
Institute of Sports Science, Japan

Sports science is a discipline that studies how the healthy human body adapts during acute and long-term exercise, and how sports and physical activity promote health and performance from cellular to whole body perspectives. The study of sports science traditionally incorporates areas of physiology (exercise physiology), psychology (sport psychology), anatomy, biomechanics (sports biomechanics), biochemistry, and kinesiology.

== Origins of exercise physiology ==
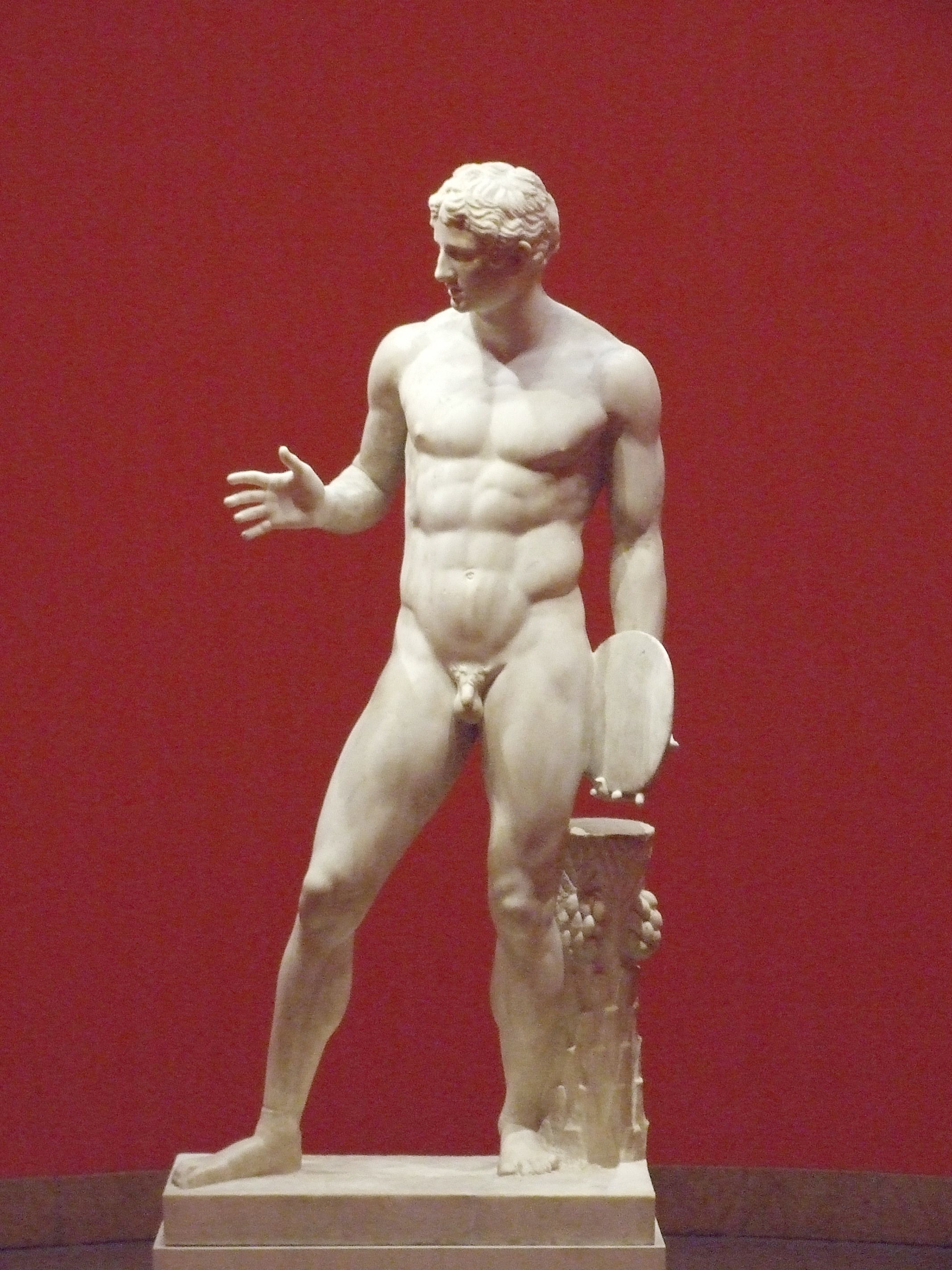
An Ancient Greek discus thrower. Sculpted by Naukydes c.380 - 390 B.C. A part of the Liebieghaus Skulpturensammlung collection, Frankfurt.

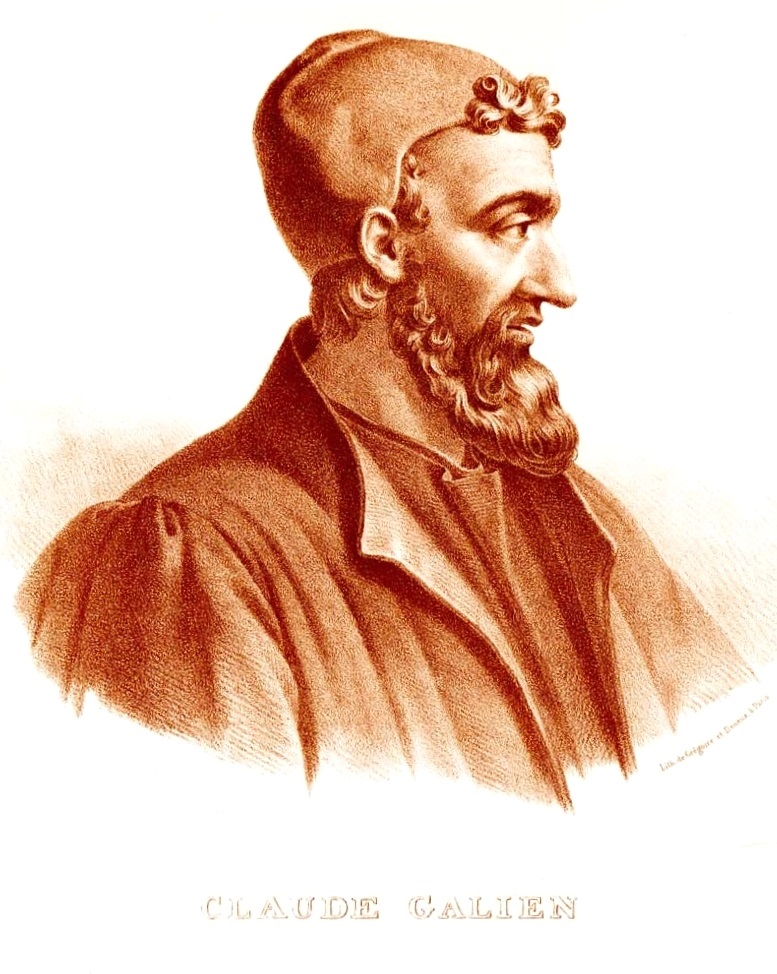
Galen

Sports science can trace its origins back to Ancient Greece. The noted ancient Greek physician Galen (131–201) wrote 87 detailed essays about improving health (proper nutrition), aerobic fitness, and strengthening muscles.

New ideas upon the working and functioning of the human body emerged during the Renaissance as anatomists and physicians challenged the previously known theories. These spread with the implementation of the printed word, the result of Gutenberg's printing press in the 15th century. Allied with this was a large increase in academia in general, universities were forming all around the world. Importantly, these new scholars went beyond the simplistic notions of the early Greek physicians, and shed light upon the complexities of the circulatory, and digestive systems. Furthermore, by the middle of the 19th century, early medical schools (such as the Harvard Medical School, formed 1782) began appearing in the United States, whose graduates went on to assume positions of importance in academia and allied medical research.

Medical journal publications increased significantly in number during this period. In 1898, three articles on physical activity appeared in the first volume of the American Journal of Physiology. Other articles and reviews subsequently appeared in prestigious journals. The German applied physiology publication, Internationale Zeitschrift fur Physiologie einschliesslich Arbeitphysiologie (1929–1940; now known as the European Journal of Applied Physiology and Occupational Physiology), became a significant journal in the field of research.

A number of key figures have made significant contributions to the study of sports science:

- Austin Flint, Jr., (1836–1915) One of the first American pioneer physicians, studied physiological responses to exercise in his influential medical textbooks.
- Edward Hitchcock, Jr., (1828–1911) Amherst College Professor of Hygiene and Physical Education, devoted his academic career to the scientific study of physical exercise, training, and the body. Coauthored 1860 text on exercise physiology.
- George Wells Fitz, M.D. (1860–1934) Created the first departmental major in Anatomy, Physiology, and Physical Training at Harvard University in 1891.
- August Krogh (1874–1949) Won the 1920 Nobel Prize in physiology for discovering the mechanism that controlled capillary blood flow in resting or active muscle.
- Per-Olof Åstrand (1922–2015) Professor at the Department of Physiology, Karolinska Institute, Stockholm. Wrote a seminal paper which evaluated the physical working capacity of men and women aged 4–33 years.

== Study of sports science ==
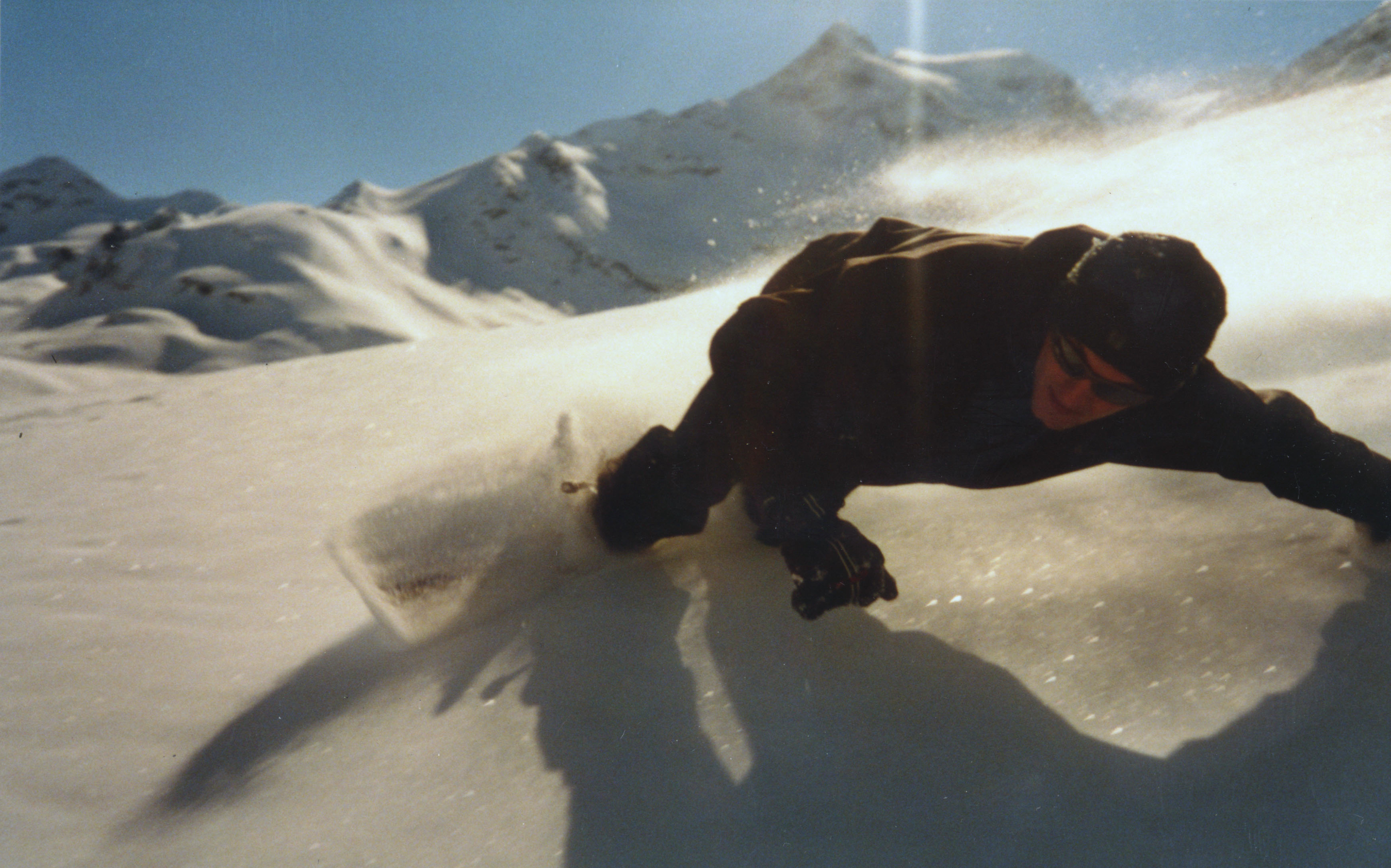
A snowboarder leaning into the curve to counter the centrifugal force may be analyzed applying a force diagram from the field of mechanics, a discipline of physics

The force diagram for the above scenario with the vectors (red arrows) for weight force (vertical), centrifugal force (horizontal) and resulting force (diagonal). It can be readily seen that the resulting force which the snowboarder's leg muscles have to withstand is much higher than the mere weight force.

A notable amount of research in the field of sports science is completed at universities or dedicated research centers. Higher-education degrees in Sports Science or Human Physiology are also becoming increasingly popular, with many universities now offering both undergraduate, postgraduate and distance learning degrees in the discipline. Opportunities for graduates in these fields include employment as a Physical Education teacher, Dietician or Nutritionist, Performance Analyst, Sports coach, Sports therapist, Fitness center manager, Sports administrator, Strength and Conditioning specialist, or retail manager of a sports store. Graduates may also be well-positioned to undertake further training to become an accredited Physiotherapist, Exercise Physiologist, Research Scientist and Sports Medical Doctor.

Sports science may also be useful for providing information on the aging body. Older adults are aware of the benefits of exercise, but many are not performing the exercise needed to maintain these benefits. Sports science provides a means of allowing older people to regain more physical competence without focusing on doing so for the purposes of anti-aging. Sports science can also provide a means of helping older people avoid falls and have the ability to perform daily tasks more independently.

In Australia, the majority of sports science research from 1983 to 2003 was done in laboratories and nearly half of the research was done with sub-elite or elite athletes. Over two-thirds of the research was done regarding four sports: rowing, cycling, athletics, and swimming. In America, sports play a big part of the American identity, however, sports science has slowly been replaced with exercise science. Sports science can allow athletes to train and compete more effectively at home and abroad.

José Mourinho, a football manager who won UEFA Champions League twice, reflected his studies of sport science as "sometimes it is difficult to understand if it is sport or if it is science".

== Academic journals in sports science ==
- Journal of Applied Biomechanics
- International Journal of Computer Science in Sport
- Journal of Strength & Conditioning Research
- Science and Medicine in Football
- Medicine & Science in Sports & Exercise
- Journal of Science and Medicine in Sport

== Reproducibility ==
A 2018 study criticized the field of exercise and sports science for insufficient replication studies, limited reporting of both null and trivial results, and insufficient research transparency. Statisticians have criticized sports science for common use of magnitude-based inference, a controversial statistical method which has allowed sports scientists to extract apparently significant results from noisy data where ordinary hypothesis testing would have found none. In response to these concerns, metaresearch (research on research) is emerging as a sub-field within sport science. Metaresearch aims to systematically evaluate and improve research practices by examining study design, statistical methods, reporting standards, and ethical considerations. This approach encourages early intervention to prevent poor practices from becoming entrenched, promotes interdisciplinary collaboration, and supports the development of dedicated centres to enhance scientific quality and reproducibility in sport science.

== See also ==
- Computer science in sport
- Heuristics and sports
- Kinanthropometry
- Kinesiology
- Sports biomechanics
- Sports medicine
