= Kinesiology =

Study of human body movement

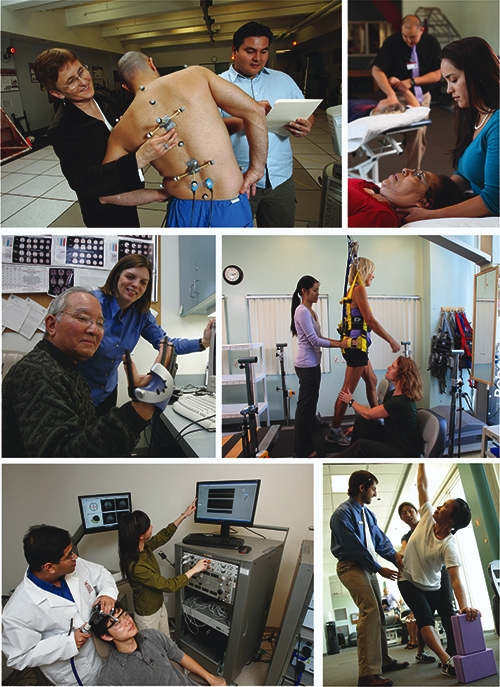
A series of images that represent research (left) and practice (right) in the field of academic kinesiology

Kinesiology (from Ancient Greek κίνησις (kínēsis) 'movement' and -λογία -logía 'study of') is the scientific study of human body movement. Kinesiology addresses physiological, anatomical, biomechanical, pathological, neuropsychological principles, and mechanisms of movement. Applications of kinesiology to human health include biomechanics and orthopedics; strength and conditioning; sport psychology; motor control; skill acquisition and motor learning; methods of rehabilitation, such as physical and occupational therapy; and sport and exercise physiology. Studies of human and animal motion include measures from motion tracking systems, electrophysiology of muscle and brain activity, various methods for monitoring physiological function, and other behavioral and cognitive research techniques.

== Basics ==
Kinesiology studies the science of human movement, performance, and function by applying the fundamental sciences of cell biology, molecular biology, chemistry, biochemistry, biophysics, biomechanics, biomathematics, biostatistics, anatomy, physiology, exercise physiology, pathophysiology, neuroscience, and nutritional science. A bachelor's degree in kinesiology can provide strong preparation for graduate study in medical school, biomedical research, as well as in professional programs.

The term "kinesiologist" is not a licensed nor professional designation in many countries, with the notable exception of Canada. Individuals with training in this area can teach physical education, work as personal trainers and sports coaches, provide consulting services, conduct research and develop policies related to rehabilitation, human motor performance, ergonomics, and occupational health and safety. In North America, kinesiologists may study to earn a Bachelor of Science, Master of Science, or Doctorate of Philosophy degree in Kinesiology or a Bachelor of Kinesiology degree, while in Australia or New Zealand, they are often conferred an Applied Science (Human Movement) degree (or higher). Many doctoral-level faculty in North American kinesiology programs received their doctoral training in related disciplines, such as neuroscience, mechanical engineering, psychology, and physiology.

In 1965, the University of Massachusetts Amherst created the United States' first Department of Exercise Science (kinesiology) under the leadership of visionary researchers and academicians in the field of exercise science. In 1967, the University of Waterloo launched Canada's first kinesiology department.

== Principles ==
=== Adaptation through exercise ===
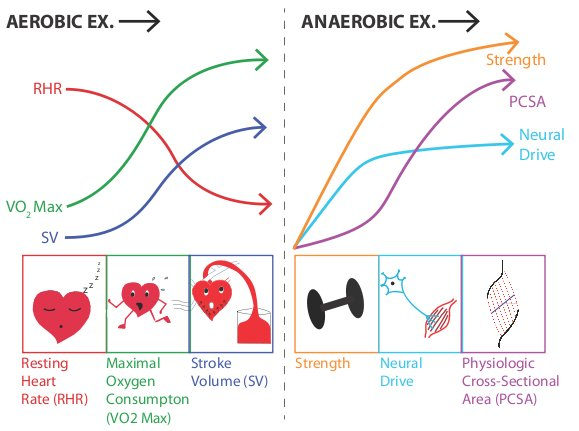
Summary of long-term adaptations to regular aerobic and anaerobic exercise. Aerobic exercise can cause several central cardiovascular adaptations, including an increase in stroke volume (SV) and maximal aerobic capacity (VO_{2} max), as well as a decrease in resting heart rate (RHR). Long-term adaptations to resistance training, the most common form of anaerobic exercise, include muscular hypertrophy, an increase in the physiological cross-sectional area (PCSA) of muscle(s), and an increase in neural drive, both of which lead to increased muscular strength. Neural adaptations begin more quickly and plateau prior to the hypertrophic response.

Adaptation through exercise is a key principle of kinesiology that relates to improved fitness in athletes as well as health and wellness in clinical populations. Exercise is a simple and established intervention for many movement disorders and musculoskeletal conditions due to the neuroplasticity of the brain and the adaptability of the musculoskeletal system. Therapeutic exercise has been shown to improve neuromotor control and motor capabilities in both normal and pathological populations.

There are many different types of exercise interventions that can be applied in kinesiology to athletic, normal, and clinical populations. Aerobic exercise interventions help to improve cardiovascular endurance. Anaerobic strength training programs can increase muscular strength, power, and lean body mass. Decreased risk of falls and increased neuromuscular control can be attributed to balance intervention programs. Flexibility programs can increase functional range of motion and reduce the risk of injury.

As a whole, exercise programs can reduce symptoms of depression and risk of cardiovascular and metabolic diseases. Additionally, they can help to improve quality of life, sleeping habits, immune system function, and body composition.

The study of the physiological responses to physical exercise and their therapeutic applications is known as exercise physiology, which is an important area of research within kinesiology.

=== Neuroplasticity ===
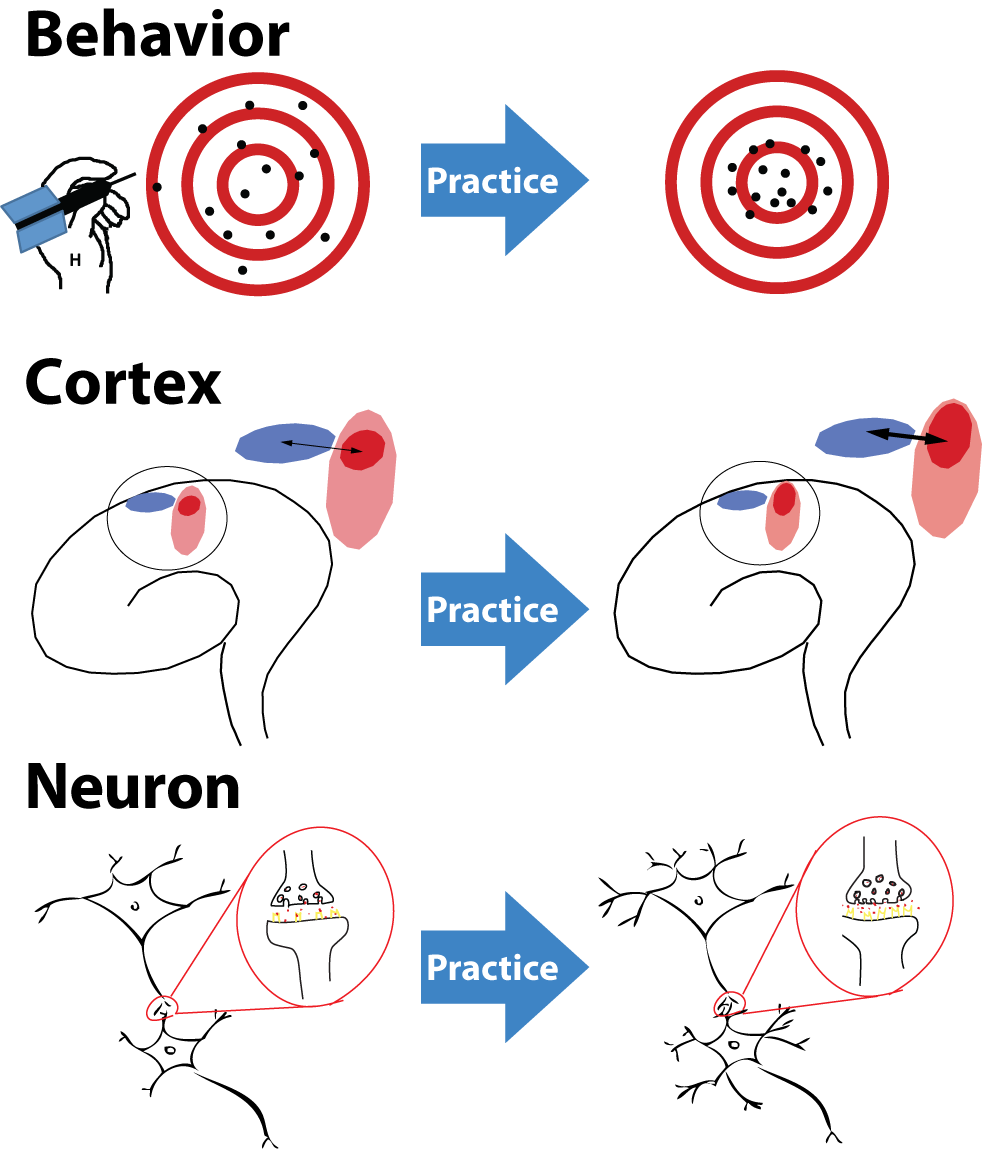
Adaptive plasticity along with practice in three levels. In behavior level, performance (e.g., successful rate, accuracy) improved after practice. In cortical level, motor representation areas of the acting muscles enlarged; functional connectivity between primary motor cortex (M1) and supplementary motor area (SMA) is strengthened. In neuronal level, the number of dendrites and neurotransmitter increase with practice.

Neuroplasticity is also a key scientific principle used in kinesiology to describe how movement and changes in the brain are related. The human brain adapts and acquires new motor skills based on this principle. The brain can be exposed to new stimuli and experiences and therefore learn from them and create new neural pathways hence leading to brain adaptation. These new adaptations and skills include both adaptive and maladaptive brain changes.

Adaptive plasticity

Recent empirical evidence indicates the significant impact of physical activity on brain function; for example, greater amounts of physical activity are associated with enhanced cognitive function in older adults. The effects of physical activity can be distributed throughout the whole brain, such as higher gray matter density and white matter integrity after exercise training, and/or on specific brain areas, such as greater activation in prefrontal cortex and hippocampus. Neuroplasticity is also the underlying mechanism of skill acquisition. For example, after long-term training, pianists showed greater gray matter density in sensorimotor cortex and white matter integrity in the internal capsule compared to non-musicians.

Maladaptive plasticity

Maladaptive plasticity is defined as neuroplasticity with negative effects or detrimental consequences in behavior. Movement abnormalities may occur among individuals with and without brain injuries due to abnormal remodeling in central nervous system. Learned non-use is an example commonly seen among patients with brain damage, such as stroke. Patients with stroke learned to suppress paretic limb movement after unsuccessful experience in paretic hand use; this may cause decreased neuronal activation at adjacent areas of the infarcted motor cortex.

There are many types of therapies that are designed to overcome maladaptive plasticity in clinic and research, such as constraint-induced movement therapy (CIMT), body weight support treadmill training (BWSTT) and virtual reality therapy. These interventions are shown to enhance motor function in paretic limbs and stimulate cortical reorganization in patients with brain damage.

=== Motor redundancy ===
Animation illustrating the concept of motor redundancy: the motor action of bringing the finger in contact with a point in space can be achieved using a wide variety of limb configurations.

Motor redundancy is a widely used concept in kinesiology and motor control which states that, for any task the human body can perform, there are effectively an unlimited number of ways the nervous system could achieve that task. This redundancy appears at multiple levels in the chain of motor execution:

- Kinematic redundancy means that for a desired location of the endpoint (e.g. the hand or finger), there are many configurations of the joints that would produce the same endpoint location in space.
- Muscle redundancy means that the same net joint torque could be generated by many different relative contributions of individual muscles.
- Motor unit redundancy means that for the same net muscle force could be generated by many different relative contributions of motor units within that muscle.

The concept of motor redundancy is explored in numerous studies, usually with the goal of describing the relative contribution of a set of motor elements (e.g. muscles) in various human movements, and how these contributions can be predicted from a comprehensive theory. Two distinct (but not incompatible) theories have emerged for how the nervous system coordinates redundant elements: simplification and optimization. In the simplification theory, complex movements and muscle actions are constructed from simpler ones, often known as primitives or synergies, resulting in a simpler system for the brain to control. In the optimization theory, motor actions arise from the minimization of a control parameter, such as the energetic cost of movement or errors in movement performance.

== Scope of practice ==
In Canada, kinesiology is a professional designation as well as an area of study. In the province of Ontario the scope has been officially defined as, "the assessment of human movement and performance and its rehabilitation and management to maintain, rehabilitate or enhance movement and performance"

Kinesiologists work in a variety of roles as health professionals. They work as rehabilitation providers in hospitals, clinics and private settings working with populations needing care for musculoskeletal, cardiac and neurological conditions. They provide rehabilitation to persons injured at work and in vehicular accidents. Kinesiologists also work as functional assessment specialists, exercise therapists, ergonomists, return to work specialists, case managers and medical legal evaluators. They can be found in hospital, long-term care, clinic, work, and community settings. Additionally, kinesiology is applied in areas of health and fitness for all levels of athletes, but more often found with training of elite athletes.

== Licensing and regulation ==
=== Canada ===
In Canada, kinesiology has been designated a regulated health profession in Ontario. Kinesiology was granted the right to regulate in the province of Ontario in the summer of 2007 and similar proposals have been made for other provinces. The College of Kinesiologists of Ontario achieved proclamation on April 1, 2013, at which time the professional title "Kinesiologist" became protected by law. In Ontario only members of the college may call themselves a Registered Kinesiologist. Individuals who have earned degrees in kinesiology can work in research, the fitness industry, clinical settings, and in industrial environments. They also work in cardiac rehabilitation, health and safety, hospital and long-term care facilities and community health centers just to name a few.

== Health service ==
The analysis of recorded human movement, as pioneered by Eadweard Muybridge, figures prominently in kinesiology

- Health promotion

Kinesiologists working in the health promotion industry work with individuals to enhance the health, fitness, and well-being of the individual. Kinesiologists can be found working in fitness facilities, personal training/corporate wellness facilities, and industry.

- Clinical/rehabilitation

Kinesiologists work with individuals with disabling conditions to assist in regaining their optimal physical function. They work with individuals in their home, fitness facilities, rehabilitation clinics, and at the worksite. They also work alongside physiotherapists and occupational therapists.

- Ergonomics

Kinesiologists work in industry to assess suitability of design of workstations and provide suggestions for modifications and assistive devices.

- Health and safety

Kinesiologists are involved in consulting with industry to identify hazards and provide recommendations and solutions to optimize the health and safety of workers.

- Disability management/case coordination

Kinesiologists recommend and provide a plan of action to return an injured individual to their optimal function in all aspects of life.

- Management/research/administration

Kinesiologists frequently fulfill roles in all above areas, perform research, and manage businesses.

- Health education

Kinesiologists working in health education teach people about behaviors that promote wellness. They develop and implement strategies to improve the health of individuals and communities. Community health workers collect data and discuss health concerns with members of specific populations or communities.

- Athletic coaches and scouts

Kinesiologists who pursue a career as an athletic coach develop new talent and guide an athlete's progress in a specific sport. They teach amateur or professional athletes the skills they need to succeed at their sport. Many coaches are also involved in scouting. Scouts look for new players and evaluate their skills and likelihood for success at the college, amateur, or professional level.

- Physical education teacher

Kinesiologists working as physical education teachers are responsible for teaching fitness, sports and health. They help students stay both mentally and physically fit by teaching them to make healthy choices.
- Physical therapy
Kinesiologists working in physical therapy diagnose physical abnormalities, restore mobility to the client, and promote proper function of joints.

== History of kinesiology ==
The Ancient Greek philosopher and polymath, Aristotle, is known as the father of kinesiology.

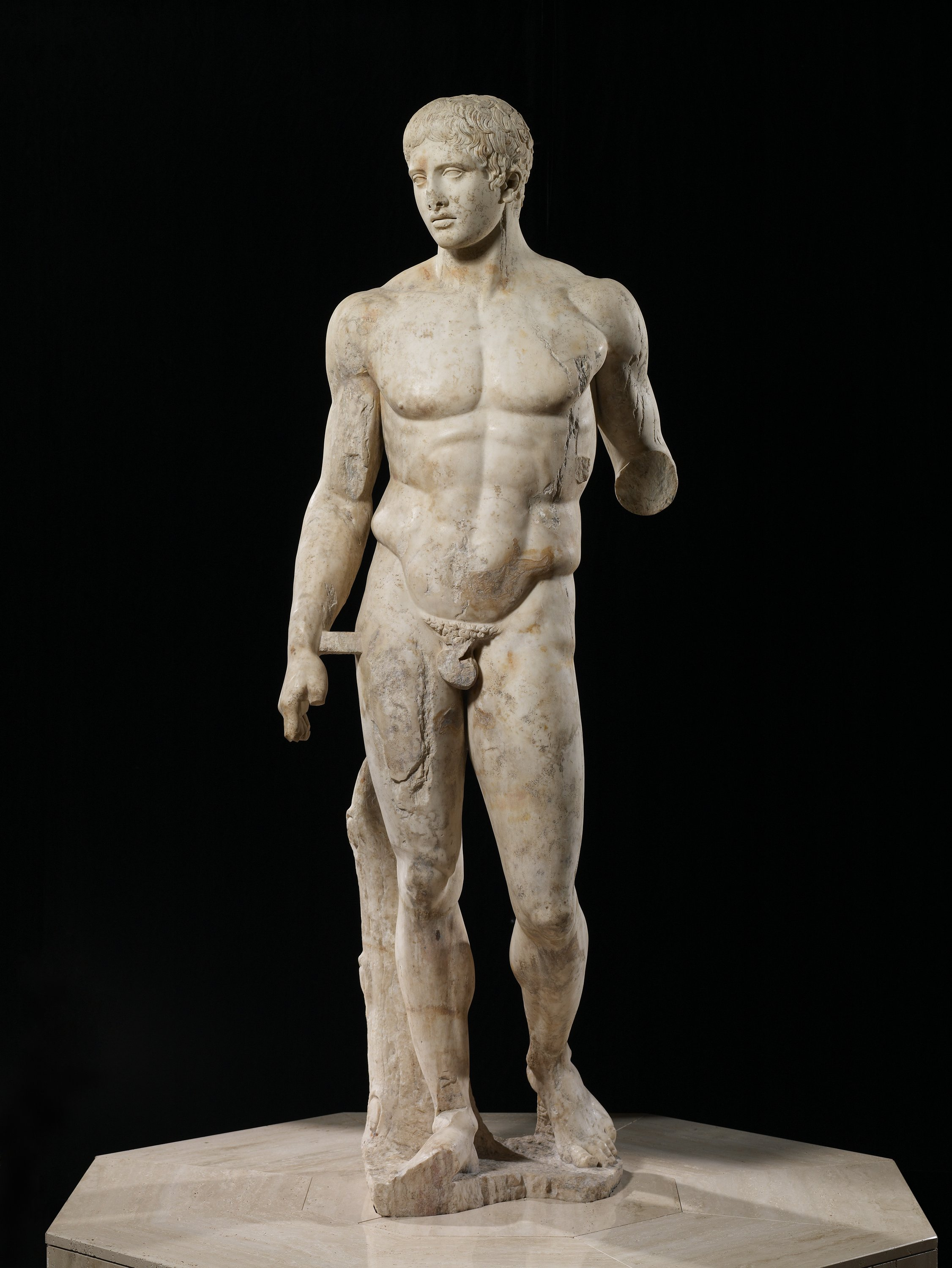
The Ancient Greeks believed that the proportions of the body could be optimised in order to improve the efficiency of movement and overall health. The Doryphorus statue. A Roman copy of an Ancient Greek original c.20-50 B.C.

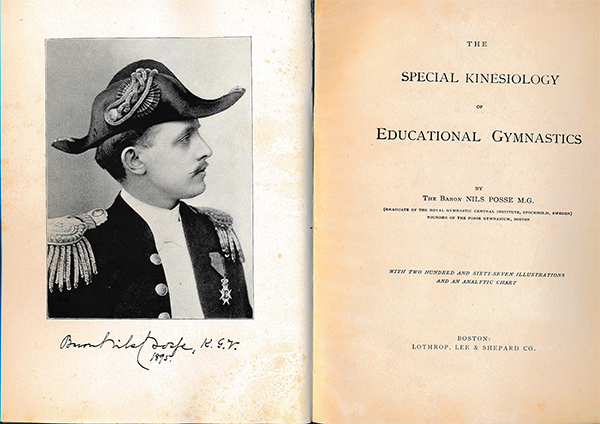
In 1886, Swedish baron Nils Posse (1862–1895) introduced the term Kinesiology in the US, 1894 he wrote the book "The Special Kinesiology of Educational Gymnastics". Nils Posse was a graduate of the Royal Gymnastic Central Institute in Stockholm, Sweden and founder of the Posse Gymnasium, Boston, MA.

The Ancient Greek philosopher Aristotle is considered to be the father of kinesiology. His pioneering work, De Motu Animalium (On the Movement of Animals), investigated the movement of animals including how their muscles and joints functioned. In Ancient Greece in general, the importance of sport and physical health through exercise was strongly promoted. The strength and shape of the muscles, including their relative proportions to each other, and the optimum positioning and alignment of the body's joints, were considered to be key factors in physical health and athletic ability.

Royal Central Institute of Gymnastics (sv) G.C.I. was founded 1813 in Stockholm, Sweden by Pehr Henrik Ling. It was the first Physiotherapy school in the world, training hundreds of medical gymnasts who spread the Swedish physical therapy around the entire world. In 1887, Sweden was the first country in the world to give a national state licence to physiotherapists/physical therapists.

The Swedish medical gymnast and kinesiologist Carl August Georgii (sv), Professor at the Royal Gymnastic Central Institute GCI in Stockholm, was the one who created and coined the new international word Kinesiology in 1854.
The term Kinesiology is a literal translation to Greek+English from the original Swedish word Rörelselära, meaning "Movement Science". It was the foundation of the Medical Gymnastics, the original Physiotherapy and Physical Therapy, developed for over 100 years in Sweden (starting 1813).

The new medical therapy created in Sweden was originally called Rörelselära (sv), and later in 1854 translated to the new and invented international word "Kinesiology". The Kinesiology consisted of nearly 2,000 physical movements and 50 different types of massage therapy techniques. They were all used to affect various dysfunctions and even illnesses, not only in the movement apparatus, but also into the internal physiology of man. Thus, the original classical and Traditional Kinesiology was not only a system of rehabilitation for the body, or biomechanics like in modern Academic Kinesiology, but also a new therapy for relieving and curing diseases, by affecting the autonomic nervous system, organs and glands in the body.,

In 1886, the Swedish Medical Gymnast Nils Posse (1862–1895) introduced the term kinesiology in the U.S. Nils Posse was a graduate of the Royal Gymnastic Central Institute in Stockholm, Sweden and founder of the Posse Gymnasium in Boston, MA. He was teaching at Boston Normal School of Gymnastics BNSG. The Special Kinesiology Of Educational Gymnastics was the first book ever written in the world with the word "Kinesiology" in the title of the book. It was written by Nils Posse and published in Boston, 1894–1895. Posse was elected posthumously as an Honorary Fellow in Memoriam in the National Academy of Kinesiology.

The National Academy of Kinesiology was formally founded in 1930 in the United States. The academy's dual purpose is to encourage and promote the study and educational applications of the art and science of human movement and physical activity and to honor by election to its membership persons who have directly or indirectly contributed significantly to the study of and/or application of the art and science of human movement and physical activity. Membership in the National Academy of Kinesiology is by election and those elected are known as Fellows. Fellows are elected from around the world. Election into the National Academy of Kinesiology is considered a pinnacle achievement and recognition with the discipline. For further information see: National Academy of Kinesiology | National Academy of Kinesiology

== Technology in kinesiology ==
Motion capture (mocap) technology has application in measuring human movement, and thus kinesiology. Historically, motion capture labs have recorded high fidelity data. While accurate and credible, these systems can come at high capital and operational costs. Modern-day systems have increased accessibility to mocap technology.

== Adapted physical activity ==
Adapted physical activity (APA) is a branch of kinesiology, referring to physical activity that is modified or designed to meet the needs of individuals with disabilities. The term originated in the field of physical education and is commonly used in the field of physical education and rehabilitation to refer to physical activities and exercises that have been modified or adapted for individuals with disabilities. These activities are often led by trained professionals, such as adapted physical educators, occupational therapists, or physical therapists.

In 1973 the Federation Internationale de lʼ Activite Physique Adaptee (International Federation of Adapted Physical Activity - IFAPA) was formed and is described as a discipline/profession that purpose to facilitates physical activity across people with a wide range of individual differences, emphasizing in empowerment, self-determination and opportunities access.

A common definition of APA is "a cross-disciplinary body of practical and theoretical knowledge directed toward impairments, activity limitations, and participation restrictions in physical activity. It is a service delivery profession and an academic field of study that supports an attitude of acceptance of individual differences, advocates access to active lifestyles and sport, and promotes innovative and cooperative service delivery, supports, and empowerment. Adapted physical activity includes, but is not limited to, physical education, sport, recreation, dance, creative arts, nutrition, medicine, and rehabilitation." This definition aligns with the World Health Organization International Classification of Functioning, Disability and Health whereby disability is seen as the interaction between impairments or conditions with activity limitations, participation restrictions and contextual factors.

=== Overview ===
The term APA has evolved in the course of years, and in some countries could be recognized with alternative terms that contain a similar set of constructs, for example, sports for disabled people, sports therapy, and psychomotor therapy. The APA is considered as (i) activities or service delivery, (ii) a profession, and (iii) an academic field of study with a unique body of knowledge that differs from terms such as adapted physical education or para-sport. Principally, APA is an umbrella term that incorporates the mentioned terms considered sub-specializations (i.e., physical education, para-sports, recreation, and rehabilitation). APA is proposed to have close links between the field of practice and the field of study with unique theories and growing bodies of practical and scientific knowledge, where APA practitioners are those who provide the services and activities, while APA scholars generate and promote evidence-based research practices among practitioners.

Adaptation to physical activity opportunities is most often provided in the form of appropriately designed and modified equipment (prosthesis, wheelchairs, mono-ski, ball size), task criteria (e.g., modifying skill quality criteria or using a different skill), instructions (e.g., using personal supports, peer tutors, non-verbal instructions, motivational strategies), physical and social environments (e.g., increasing or decreasing court dimensions; segregated vs. inclusive; type of training climate: mastery-oriented, collaborative or competitive social environment; degree of peer and parental support), and rules (e.g., double bounce rule in wheelchair tennis). In general, the APA presents various sub-specializations such as physical education (e.g., inclusion in physical education, attention to students with special needs, development of new education contents), sports (e.g., development of paralympic sports, activity by sports federations for athletes with disabilities), recreation (e.g., development of the inclusive sport approach and attitudes change programs), and rehabilitation (e.g., physical activity programs in rehabilitation centers, involvement of health-related professionals).

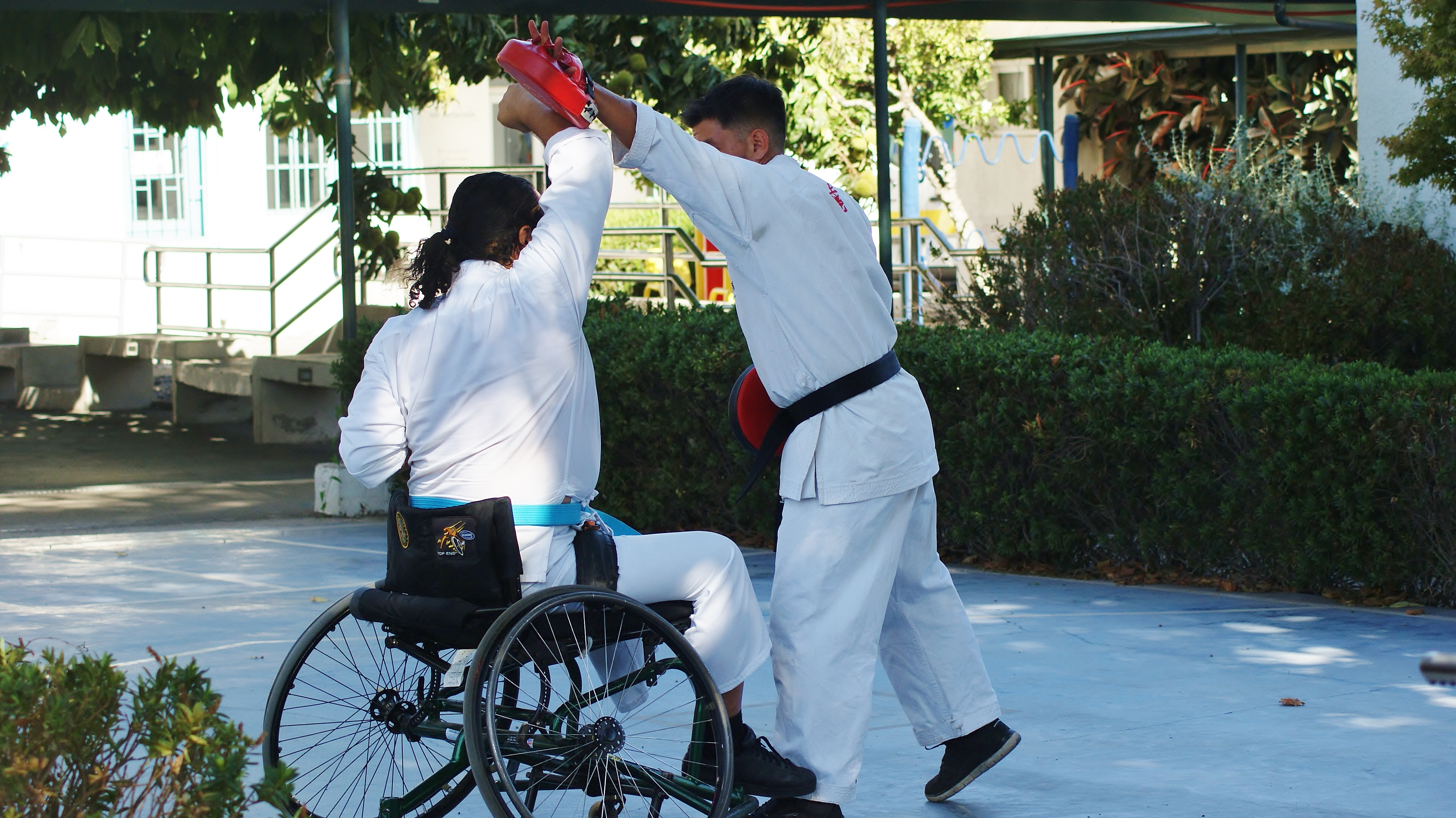
The image represents the practice activity in the field of Adapted Physical Activity (APA).

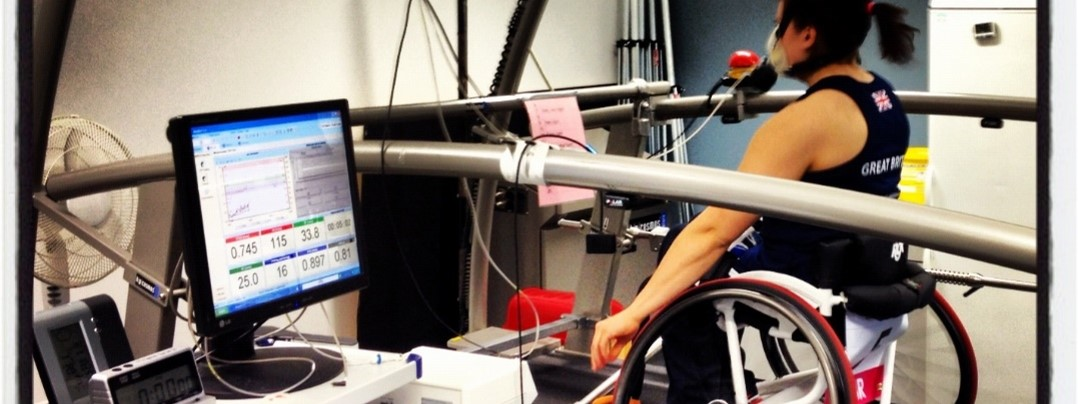
The image represents research activity in the field of Adapted Physical Activity (APA).

The role of sports and physical activity participation in the population with disabilities has been recognized as a human right in the Convention on the Rights of Persons with Disabilities and declared in other international organization agreements such as:

- International Charter of Physical Education, Physical Activity and Sport (UNESCO).
- International Conference of Ministers and Senior Officials Responsible for Physical Education and Sport (MINEPS).
- Marseille Declaration, Universal Fitness Innovation & Transformation - UFIT Launch October 2015. A Commitment to Inclusion by and for the Global Fitness Industry.
- Sustainable Development Goals, Sports and Physical Activity, United Nations (UN).

In this line, the APA as a discipline/profession plays an essential role in addressing the needs from a theoretical and practical framework to provide full participation access in physical activity to populations with disabilities.

There are many educational programmes offered around the world that specialise in APA, including disability sports, adapted sports, rehabilitation, adapted physical education and parasport management. In Europe there is the European Diploma of Adapted Physical Activity for bachelor's degrees. At the master's degree level, there is the International Masters in Adapted Physical Activity and the master's degree in Adapted Physical Activity offered by the Lithuanian Sports University. A doctoral programme in adapted physical activity can be studied through the Multi-Institution Mentorship Consortium (MAMC). Furthermore, there is offered a Master of Adapted Physical Education in the North American region in Oregon State University (USA). In the South American Region, the San Sebastian University (Chile) offers a Master of Physical Activity and Adapted Sports. The universities Viña del Mar and UMCE in Chile offers a specialization in adapted physical activity.

=== International Federation of Adapted Physical Activity ===
The International Federation of Adapted Physical Activity (IFAPA) is an international scientific organization of higher education scholars, practitioners and students dedicated to promoting APA. IFAPA was founded in 1973 in Quebec, Canada, presenting an original purpose declared "to give global focus to professionals who use adapted physical activities for instruction, recreation, remediation, and research". From these initial times, IFAPA evolved from a small organization to an international corporation with active regional federations in different world regions.

The current purpose of IFAPA are:

- To encourage international cooperation in the field of physical activity to the benefit of individuals of all abilities,
- to promote, stimulate and support research in the field of adapted physical activity throughout the world,
- and to make scientific knowledge of and practical experiences in adapted physical activity available to all interested persons, organizations and institutions.

IFAPA coordinates national, regional, and international functions (both governmental and nongovernmental) that pertain to sport, dance, aquatics, exercise, fitness, and wellness for individuals of all ages with disabilities or special needs. IFAPA is linked with several other international governing bodies, including the International Paralympic Committee (IPC), Special Olympics International and the International Council of Sport Science and Physical Education (ICSSPE). English is the language used for IFAPA correspondence, conferences. Professor David Legg from Mount Royal University is the current president of the International Federation of Adapted Physical Activity (IFAPA) since 2019 at the International Symposium of Adapted Physical Activity (ISAPA) hosted by IFAPA Past President Martin Block at the University of Virginia.

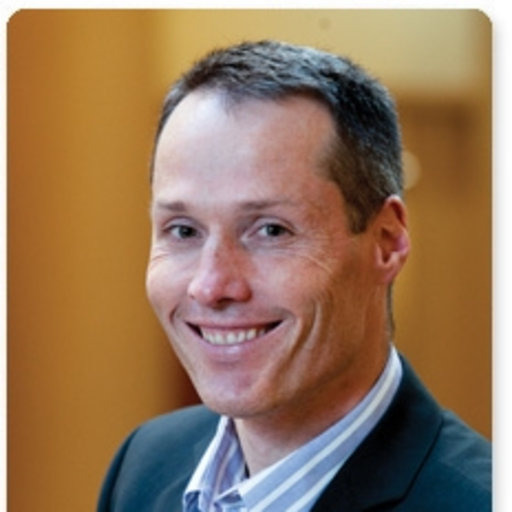
Professor David Legg current President of the International Federation of Adapted Physical Activity (IFAPA)

The biennial ISAPA scheduled for 2021 was planned to be held at the University of Jyväskylä, Finland. Due to the COVID-19 pandemic it was later announced to be held online only, making it the first Online ISAPA since the first one in 1977. The 2023 ISAPA was awarded to a multi-site organisation by Halberg Foundation in New Zealand and Mooven in France.

==== Regions ====
- Africa - no formal organisation
- Asia - Asian society of adapted physical education - ASAPE
- Europe - European Federation of Adapted Physical Activity - EUFAPA
- Middle East - Middle East Federation of Adapted Physical Activity - MEFAPA
- North America - North American Federation of Adapted Physical Activity - NAFAPA
- Oceania - no formal organisation
- South and Central America - South American Federation of Adapted Physical Activity - SAPA

=== Research and dissemination in adapted physical activity ===
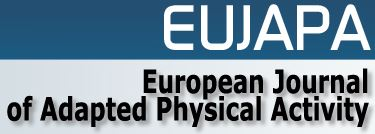
European Journal of Adapted Physical Activity

It is possible to find numerous sports science journals with research papers on adapted sport, while those specific to APA are lesser. Adapted Physical Activity Quarterly (APAQ) is the only AFA-specific journal indexed in the Journal Citation Reports Index, appearing in both the Sport Sciences and Rehabilitation directories, which is another example of its interdisciplinarity (Impact Score 2020-2021 = 2.61) (Pérez et al., 2012). Additionally, the European Journal of Adapted Physical Activity (EUJAPA) is another international, multidisciplinary journal introduced to communicate, share and stimulate academic inquiry focusing on APA of persons with disabilities, appearing in the Education directories of Scimago Journal & Country Rank (SJR). Regarding the dissemination of scientific knowledge generated by the APA, the most relevant international events are described as follows:

- International Symposium of Adapted Physical Activity (ISAPA), organized by IFAPA on a biannual basis.
- Vista conference, organized by the International Paralympic Committee on a biannual basis.
- Paralympic Congress, organized by the International Paralympic Committee every four years.
- European Conference on Adapted Physical Activity (EUCAPA), organized by European Federation in Adapted Physical Activity on a biannual basis.
- North American Federation of Adapted Physical Activity (NAFAPA) Conference, organized by NAFAPA on a biannual basis.
- South American Adapted Physical Activity Conference, organized by South American Federation of Adapted Physical Activity.

=== Adapted physical education ===
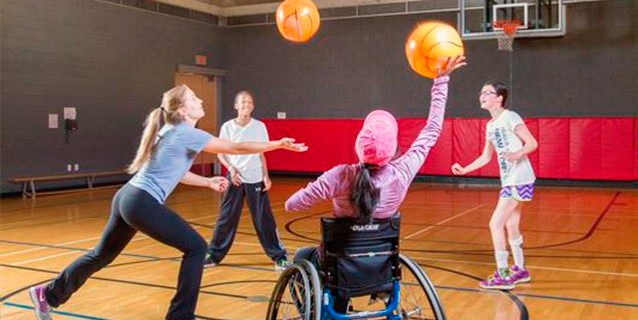
The image represents activities with students with disabilities associated to the Adapted Physical Education field.

Adapted physical education is a sub-discipline of physical education with a focus on including students with disabilities into the subject. APE is the term used to refer to the physical education for individuals with disabilities that occurs primarily in elementary and secondary schools. According to Dunn and Leitschuh APE is defined as "Adapted physical education programs are those that have the same objectives as the regular physical education program but in which adjustments are made in the regular offerings to meet the needs and abilities of exceptional students". This education can be provided in separate educational settings as well as in general (regular) educational settings. APE is oriented to educate students to lifelong engagement in physical activities and to live a healthy lifestyle offering possibilities to exploit movements, games, and sports and at the same time personal development. Goals and objectives of adapted and general physical education might be the same with some minor differences. For example, learning to push a wheelchair or play wheelchair basketball might be a goal for a child with a spinal cord injury, while running and playing regular basketball is a goal for a child with a disability. In other cases, a child with a disability might focus on fewer objectives or modified objectives within a domain (e.g., physical fitness) compared to peers without disabilities.

=== Parasport or disability sport ===
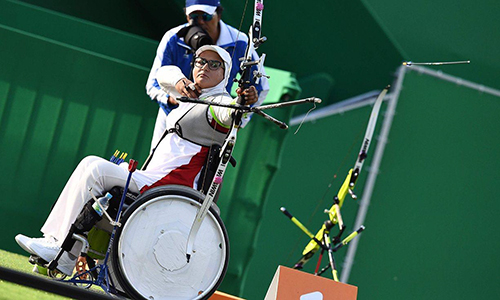
Para-archery athlete competing

The APA in this field is oriented principally to the Parasports movement, which organises sports for and by people with disabilities. Examples of para-sports organizations include sports in the Paralympic Games, Special Olympics, Deaflympics as well as Invictus games to name a few. Many para-sports have eligibility criteria according to the characteristics of the participants. In the Paralympics Games, this is known as sport classification, a system that provides a framework for determining who can and who cannot participate according to the impact of the impairments on the outcome of the competition.

In the Special Olympics individuals eligible have to meet the following criteria

- be at least 8 years old
- have been identified by an agency or professional as having one of the following conditions: intellectual disabilities, cognitive delays (as measured by formal assessment), or significant learning or vocational problems due to cognitive delay that require specially designed instruction.

Another sporting competition for people with intellectual impairments is the Virtus Games (formerly known as International Sports Federation for Persons with Intellectual Disability. This is different from the Special Olympics. Eligibility is based on a master list of

- II 1 Intellectual Disability
- II 2 Significant Intellectual Disability
- II 3 Autism

To be eligible to compete at the Deaflympics, athletes must have a hearing loss of at least 55 decibels in the better ear. The Invictus Games were designed to allow sport competitions between wounded, injured or sick servicemen and women (WIS). Therefore, only people in the military sectors can compete in the Invictus games.

=== Physical medicine and rehabilitation ===
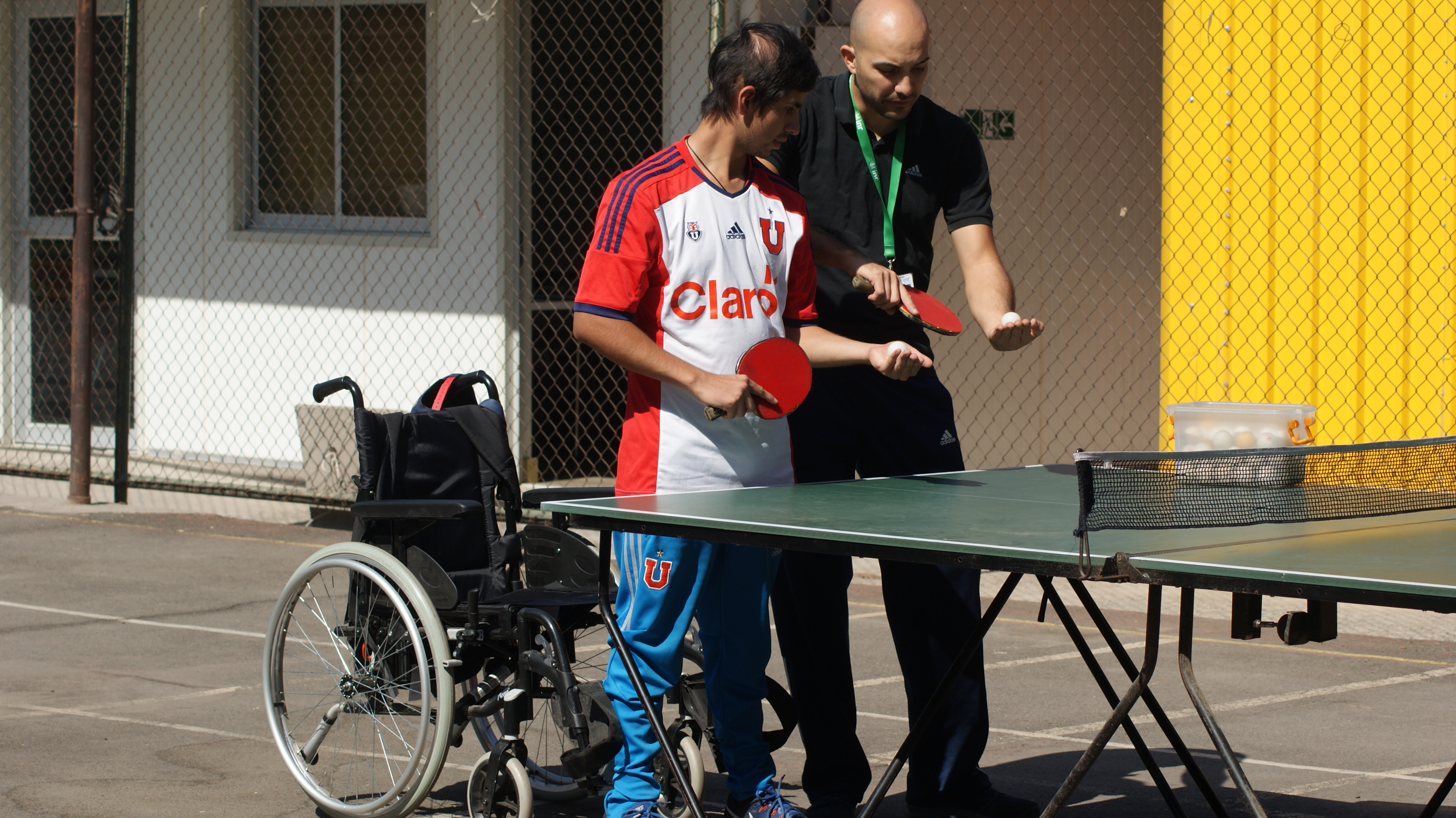
Adapted Physical Activity in the rehabilitation process of people with disabilities

The results from APA can help the practice of Physical medicine and rehabilitation, whereby the functional ability and quality of life is improved. Rehabilitation is helping the individual achieve the highest level of functioning, independence, participation, and quality of life possible. The APA and sport in rehabilitation for individuals with disabilities is particularly important and is associated with the legacy of the medical rehabilitation specialist Sir Ludwig Guttman who was the founder of the International Stoke Mandeville Games Federation, the basis of the actual Paralympic movement. APA and sports are strongly recommended in rehabilitation programs due to the positive impact and health benefits in people with different disabilities. The APA practitioner provides exercise and training regimens adapted for specific individual needs and works based on the International Classification of Functioning, Disability, and Health of the World Health Organization, facilitating a common language with other rehabilitation professionals during the rehabilitation process.

== See also ==
- Adapted Physical Education (USA)
- Anatomical terms of motion
- Assistive technology in sport
- Disability
- Disabled sports
- Exercise physiology
- Human musculoskeletal system
- Kinanthropometry
- Kinesiogenomics
- Kinesiotherapy
- Mental practice of action
- Motor imagery
- Movement assessment
- Neurology
- Parasports
- Physical therapy (USA)
- Physiological movement
- Sports science
