= Adapted physical education =

Physical education for disabled learners

Adapted physical education is the a specialized program of developing, implementing, and monitoring a carefully designed physical education. Instructional program for a learner with a disability, based on a comprehensive assessment, to give the learner the skills necessary for a lifetime of rich leisure, recreation, and sport experiences to enhance physical fitness and wellness. Principles and Methods of Adapted Physical Education and Recreation. Adapted physical education generally refers to school-based programs for students ages 3–21 years. APE also aims to provide modifications and accommodations to make physical activity accessible and beneficial for all students, regardless of their abilities. This may involve adapting the curriculum, tasks, equipment, or environment to ensure participation. Federal law mandates that physical education be provided to students with disabilities. Physical Education is defined as the development of physical and motor skills, fundamental motor skills and patterns, skills in aquatics, dance and individual and group games and sports; including intramural and lifetime sports. Adapted Physical Education National Standards - What is Adapted Physical Education? The goal of Adapted Physical Education is to help those individuals with Disabilities grow those skills physically and develop those fundamental motor skills. Not only in a school setting but also outside of school as well. The students who qualify may have one of the following conditions. Autism, Traumatic brain injury, Hearing impairment and Speech or language impairment. This could even include someone with a visual impairment like blindness.

== Adapted Physical Education National Standards (APENS) ==
The Adapted Physical Education National Standards promotes qualified, nationally certified educators to provide physical education services to students with disabilities. There are 15 different standards that were developed by the National Consortium for Physical Education for Individuals with Disabilities (NCPEID). These standards provide essential knowledge that educators need to know in order to provide the best education for individuals with disabilities. You can become a Certified Adapted Physical Education (CAPE), in order to demonstrate your knowledge and ability to provide education for children with disabilities in physical education settings (NCPEID, 2025). It is a federally mandated law that physical education is provided to students with disabilities, and, in turn, defined physical education as the development of physical and motor skills, fundamental motor skills and patterns, and skills in aquatics, dance, and individual and group games and sports.

The Individuals with Disabilities Education Improvement Act (IDEA) of 2004 mandates free and appropriate public education services for all children with disabilities. Although physical education for individuals with disabilities was addressed at the federal level, it is up to the individual states to determine what is considered a "professional" (NCPEID, 2025). In consequence, there are an abundant of certificates/licenses that make individuals "professionally qualified" to teach individuals with disabilities. There are 38 states that have not defined the qualifications needed to properly educate individuals with disabilities. In order to combat confusion within the education community, there are a set of standards that were created.

== European Standards of Adapted Physical Activity (EUSAPA) ==
The European Standards of Adapted Physical Activity has a set of standards for adapted physical education. They were revised to consider teaching adapted physical activity remotely. This was a result of COVID-19 forcing schools to go fully online and teach classes remotely. Many students and teachers faced struggles from this and had to navigate how to teach physical education classes online, especially considering the students with disabilities and how to communicate and teach them. For many teachers, this was their first time teaching online. Teachers turned to technology to deliver their classes to students. This allowed for them to ensure the student's safety and still be able to deliver the instruction based on the students abilities. EUSAPA has four sections that they use to describe professional capability; professional collaborations, inclusion teaching, evaluation of students, and teacher planning. Since schools were forced to go remote and technology became essential for teaching classes, the framework of Technology Pedagogy, and Content Knowledge (TPACK) became a necessity to lean on. While most current physical education teachers are not familiar with the training for TPACK, the experience of COVID-19 has allowed them to becoming familiar with items in TPACK.

When teaching adapted physical activity in Europe, a big concern is within the training of the teachers, their competency, facilities, and support. In order to combat this, it has been emphasized that within the initial training for teachers, adapted physical activity needs to be incorporated, if not already, more focus is needed. The European Inclusive Physical Education Training (EIPET) was a project created in 2009 with the aim to focus on providing modules and recommendations for teachers. This allowed teachers to learn how to plan lessons, teach in an inclusive setting, advocate for their students, and evaluate their students progress when it came to students with special education needs.

== Key legislation ==
=== Education of all Handicapped Children Act of 1975 (P.L. 94–142) ===
The history of Adapted Physical Education began with the implementation of P.L. 94–142 in 1975. This act recognized physical education as a direct service. Specially designed physical education programs must be made available to every disabled child receiving a Free, Appropriate Public Education (FAPE).

=== Americans with Disabilities Act (P.L. 101–336) ===
The Americans with Disabilities Act (ADA) was enacted in 1990 to prohibit the discrimination of individuals with disabilities in the public and private sectors. The ADA outlaws discrimination against a person with a disability in five spheres: employment, public services, transportation, public accommodations, and telecommunications. ADA requires accessibility in physical education facilities. Examples include: Weight rooms that accommodate wheelchair users, gym lockers that use combination locks, playgrounds surrounded by a fence, and well lighted gymnasiums to aid students with visual impairments.

=== Individuals with Disabilities Education Act (IDEA) ===
Enacted in 1990 (and reauthorized in 1997 and 2004), IDEA was the reauthorization of PL 94–142 and continued the emphasis upon FAPE, IEP, LRE, and physical education as a direct educational service. With this reauthorization, person-first terminology was instituted, and emphasis was placed on the education of students with disabilities within the general curriculum and parent involvement in educational programming. Under Federal Law, in order to qualify for this special education programming, students must fall within one of the thirteen disability categories identified under IDEA and demonstrate an academic need.

== Individualized Education Program or IEP ==
An Individualized Educational Program (IEP) can be defined as a plan for each student, ages 3 to 21, who qualifies for special education services, based on an evaluation. All IEP's are outcome-oriented giving assurance that the student will benefit from special education and have real opportunities, full participation, independent living, and economic self-efficiency. If a student is receiving adapted physical education services, it must be identified on the IEP and APE goals should be developed and implemented. IEPs are revised once a year by an IEP team. Individuals with an IEP should receive a reevaluation every three years. IEP's are developed by the IEP team and based on comprehensive assessment as outlined by guidelines established in IDEA.

=== Purpose ===
Federal law mandates that each student receiving special education and related services must have an Individualized Education Program (IEP) developed for them. An IEP must be designed and written specifically for one student, outlining individualized needs, and used to establish an appropriate educational placement. Some consider the IEP to be a "management" program to guide appropriate service delivery, which includes the area of physical education. The IEP creates an opportunity for teachers, parents, school administrators, related services personnel and students (when appropriate) to work together to improve educational results for learners with disabilities.

=== Do all students with disabilities need an IEP for physical education? ===
No, IDEA (Individuals with Disabilities Education Act) 2004 mandates each individual with a disability have an IEP developed if necessary to benefit their education. If an appropriate assessment is completed and the IEP team decides the student is not safe and/or successful in general physical education without supplementary aids and services, then an IEP is developed and services provided. A student can have IEP goals related to physical education needs regardless of their educational placement.

=== Placement options ===
What is the relationship between placement and the IEP?

Decisions based on IDEA qualifications are generally discussed and determined during an Individual Education Program (IEP) meeting. IEP recommendations for services and supports must consider a student's unique needs, as well as the Least Restrictive Environment (LRE)." The LRE will be based upon the assessment process and where the IEP goals can best be met. There are a variety of placement option which should be considered including:
- Full-time General PE (GPE)
- General PE with a younger class
- Part-time Adapted PE (GPE for some units or parts of a lesson)
- Reverse Mainstreaming
- Small Group or One on One PE
- Separate School
- Home/Hospital

=== IEP/IPEP ===
IPEP stands for Individual Physical Education Program. It is a written document that parallels the IEP in form and content but is specific to physical education. Unlike the IEP, the IPEP is not a legal document. Instead, it is a summary of assessment data and needs of a student. An IPEP provides recommendations for placement, services, and the teaching and learning conditions that will be best suited for each student.

== Section 504 Plan ==
Section 504 of the Rehabilitation Act of 1973 protects the rights of individuals with disabilities in programs and activities that receive federal financial assistance, including federal funds. Section 504 provides that: "No otherwise qualified individual with a disability in the United States ... shall, solely by reason of her or his disability, be excluded from the participation in, be denied the benefits of, or be subjected to discrimination under any program or activity receiving Federal financial assistance...

=== What is the difference between an IEP and a Section 504 Plan? ===
If a student has one of the thirteen disabilities identified by IDEA and demonstrates an educational need, special services are provided. These services are guided by the IEP. Students who do not meet the qualifications for IDEA but still have a disability and require some assistance to be able to participate in physical education would be candidates for a Section 504 Plan. A Section 504 Plan spells out the modifications and accommodations that will be needed for these students to have an opportunity to perform at the same level as their peers (might include things like a wheelchair ramp, blood sugar monitoring, etc.).

== Use of technology ==
The integration of digital technology into adapted physical education (APE) has expanded the tools available for instruction and student tracking. APE educators utilize class websites, video demonstrations, and mobile applications to assist students in tracking their physical progress and meeting Individualized Education Program (IEP) goals. Applications such as MyFitnessPal and MapMyFitness enable students to log exercise and nutrition data, providing instructors with metrics for evaluating physical development. Furthermore, video recordings are used to offer visual guidance during exercise transitions, while exergaming platforms such as the Nintendo Wii and EyeToy Play—provide accessible physical activity options both in the classroom and at home.

== Teaching adapted physical education ==
=== Qualifications ===
Qualifications vary by state. In order to be qualified an educator must have met their state's approved or recognized certification, licensing, registration, or other comparable requirements. While these vary by state, there are national standards set in place to allow somebody to become a Certified Adapted Physical Education Professional or CAPE. These requirements include

- A bachelor's degree in physical education or equivalent (sport science, kinesiology, etc.)
- A minimum of 200 hours of practicum experiences in adapted physical education
- Completion of a minimum of 9 credits of coursework from a related field
- A valid teaching certificate in physical education
- Take the APENS National Certification Exam

While certification will certainly help educators create well-developed adapted physical education programs, there are no requirements for local school districts to hire CAPE's.

=== Determining what to teach ===
A physical education instructor will assess the needs of the students considering their employment opportunities and living arrangements after graduation. This will allow them to create an adapted physical education curriculum for students following the ABC planning process. The steps in this process are as follows.

1. Define the student's curriculum goals.
2. Delineate the objectives for each curriculum goal.
3. Determine the emphasis each goal should receive in the curriculum.
4. Calculate the amount of time available.
5. Calculate the average objective mastery time.
6. Determine how much content can fit in the curriculum.
7. Sequence the goals and objectives developmentally.

=== Class format ===
Class format is defined as the way in which members of the class are organized. There are seven class formats that are most commonly used in adapted physical education settings.

1. One-to-one instruction: one teacher or assistant for every student.
2. Small group: 3-10 students working together with a teacher or assistant.
3. Large group: entire class participating together as a group.
4. Mixed group: using various class formats within one class period.
5. Peer teaching or tutoring: using classmates or students without disabilities from other classes for teaching and assisting students with disabilities.
6. Teaching stations: several areas in which smaller subsets for the class rotate to practice skills.
7. Self-paced independent work: each student works on individual goals at his or her own pace following directions on task cards or with guidance from the teacher or assistant.

Teachers must find the best class format to help the student achieve the goals for the lesson.

== Age-Appropriate Curriculum Examples in Adapted Physical Education ==
Adapted Physical Education (APE) programs are designed to align with age-appropriate developmental milestones, while accommodating individual needs related to disability. Examples of curriculum implementation vary across grade levels:

Elementary School: In early grades, such as third grade, a student with autism spectrum disorder may use a communication device to participate in social and physical activities. For instance, the student might use the device to share a scripted invitation with peers to play a game like tag, thereby working on both physical coordination and social interaction skills.

Middle School: At the middle school level, such as in seventh grade, a student with cerebral palsy might participate in a general physical education class with individualized modifications. These modifications may be implemented collaboratively by an APE teacher and a physical therapist, and could include a strength-building program using assistive equipment like a gait trainer.

High school: In high school, APE programs may focus on facilitating lifelong fitness and social participation. For example, a student with Down syndrome in their senior year might be introduced to adult community-based recreation programs, helping prepare for post-secondary transition through engagement in inclusive physical and social activities.

== Teaching for specific disabilities ==
=== Intellectual Disabilities ===
There are a number of general modifications that can be applied in a physical education environment for students with intellectual disabilities.

The first set of modifications deal with communication. When instructing students use shorter sentences, use gestures or demonstrations as supplement to verbal cues, repeat directions and have students repeat directions back to you, provide praise often, and give more feedback.

The next set of modifications deal with practice. Give students extra practice trials, build in more time for a student to master skills, make sure activities are perceived as fun, promote active participation, shorten activities to reduce problems with attention span, and allow choices in what activity will be done, when it will be done, where it will take place, and with whom the child will participate in the activity with. One method to structure activities is known as level teaching. To accommodate for students with varying levels of intellectual disabilities a game will be designed with different levels. For example, if the specific sport is volleyball the instructor will set up 3 courts with different modifications at each court to accommodate for these varying levels of disability. Court 1 may have a set of cones designating opposing sides while Court 3 has a net set in place. Different rules may be applied to different courts as well, allowing every student to be challenged in a constructive way.

The third set of modifications deal with curriculum. Adjust the general education curriculum to meet the needs of a student. For example, reduce the number of objectives that need to be mastered. If a student is severely delayed, an entirely new curriculum may need to be made. Activities may also need to provide early success which will encourage adherence.

=== Learning disabilities ===
1 in 5 students with learning disabilities will also have motor impairments. There are a number of ways to accommodate these students.

Reduce class size: This allows teacher extra one on one time with students. Often a class of 20-30 students proves to be more effective than double or triple that in general physical education classes.

Use peer tutors: Peers can be rained in how to provide specific skill feedback as well as modify activities so the student has higher success. This can be effective when class size cannot be reduced.

Offer learning strategies: Both teachers and peer tutors can provide strategies to help disorganized learners focus. This includes provided picture cues, video cues, and additional cues such as footprints on the floor to help a student understand what and how to perform an activity.

Provide structured practice: Allow the student to get many practice opportunities. This will help them learn how to listen to and observe visual feedback for performance.

Identify success: Reframe success for students in a way that does not focus on the result. For example, using correct form in shooting should be a measure of success rather than making the basket.

Use a variety of senses when giving instructions: Some students do better listening to instruction while others do better watching a demonstration. Others may do best when physically guided into the pattern. By incorporating many types of learning styles, students will be more likely to succeed.

=== ADHD ===
Students with attention-deficit/hyperactivity disorder may experience motor learning delays. Many strategies are available to minimize learning delays in students with ADHD.

Positive feedback: There is a relationship between positive feedback given by a physical education teacher and students applying corrective feedback.

Task sheets: A task sheet provides a progression of activities to be completed by the students and requires them to record their results. Task sheets can be turned in at the end of class. This allows students to assess their performance while acknowledging their need to improve their skills.

Token economy or point system: This is a structured agreement between the student and teacher in which the student earns rewards by meeting a minimum expectation. At the end of class both the student and teacher initial the points earned. At the end of the month, the student may earn a reward of his or her choice provided by the teacher.

=== Autism spectrum disorder ===
Various strategies exist to allow students with autism to be successfully included in a physical education setting.

Preparing for inclusion: It is essential to know the students needs, abilities, and preferences. It is also important to prepare the student. The physical education environment may be anxiety inducing for them. Because of this, educators can slowly introduce the student to the environment. They may also preview the class using visual organizers to describe the setting the student will be a part of. They may also make visual schedules prior to class. It is also important to prepare the peers by teaching them what autism is and behaviors associated with it.

Instructing the student: There are a variety of methods for instructing students with autism. The first, environmental prompts. This involves the intentional use of equipment to encourage specific behaviors. The next is verbal prompts. This includes avoiding negative sentences. For example, instruction such as "step with your right leg" as opposed to "don't step with your left leg". Verbal prompts also include keeping phrases literal as well as provided concise instruction. It is also important to be consistent with language use. Peer tutors may also provide a lot of benefits for students in the physical education setting.

=== Deafness ===
Being deaf or hard of hearing typically has little impact on the development of motor skills, fitness levels, and participation in sports. However, it is still important to accommodate students who are deaf or hard of hearing in the physical education setting.

Communicate using his or her preferred means of communication. When giving verbal instructions, make sure the student can see the instructors face clearly. Make sure you speak clearly and at a normal rate. Incorporate visual aids that have images or descriptive words. Repeat comments or questions made by the student's classmates. This helps all students alike. Check for understanding by asking students to repeat directions or demonstrate a skill. If an interpreter is involved, make sure to speak directly to the student, rather than the interpreter.

=== Visual impairments ===
Children with visual impairments can play all of the same sports as their sighted peers, with some modifications. This may include a beeping ball or allowing blind player to walk around and feel the environment before they begin. Modifications can be made continuously until the best solution is found. Children with visual impairments and blindness may need more instruction and practice time to learn new concepts and movements. It is suggested that students receive pre-teaching before the start of a new unit. This can be done before school, after school, during orientation, or at home. Peer tutors may also be effective for students with visual impairments or blindness.

== Instructing Students with Physical Disabilities in Adapted Physical Education ==
Adapted Physical Education (APE) programs aim to provide inclusive physical education experiences for students with physical disabilities, including those who use wheelchairs, walkers, or other mobility aids. These programs emphasize physical fitness, motor skill development, social interaction, and overall physical well-being, and are tailored to the individual needs and capabilities of each student.

=== Instructional Strategies and Modifications ===
APE educators employ a variety of instructional strategies to ensure accessibility and inclusivity:

- Accessible Environments: Physical education spaces should include structural accommodations such as ramps, wide doorways, and appropriate flooring to allow safe access for mobility device users.
- Adaptive Equipment: Modified equipment may be necessary to facilitate participation. Examples include gait trainers, sports wheelchairs, and sport-specific adaptive tools.
- Individualized Instruction: Activities are often tailored to meet the specific needs documented in a student's Individualized Education Program (IEP).
- Modified Activities: Games and activities can be adapted to consider different abilities. For example, a wheelchair user might carry a ball in their lap during play, or lighter equipment might be used to ensure accessibility.
- Visual Supports: Step-by-step visual instructions and written guides can help students understand activity procedures, reducing cognitive load and enhancing participation.
- Peer Support: Integrating peer involvement fosters social inclusion and can improve teamwork, cooperation, and student confidence.
- Safety Considerations: Safety protocols are essential, especially when mobility devices are in use during physical activities, to prevent injury.

=== Collaborative Teaching Approaches ===
APE instruction is often delivered through a collaborative model that includes general education teachers, special educators, physical therapists, and occupational therapists. Regular team meetings help ensure that physical education plans are aligned with students' individualized learning and health goals.

== Assessment and Evaluation in Adapted Physical Education ==
Assessment and evaluation are foundational components of Adapted Physical Education (APE), enabling instructional decision-making tailored to the individualized needs of students with disabilities. Within APE, assessment serves multiple purposes, including the development of meaningful activities, the facilitation of appropriate goal-setting, and the measurement of student progress to ensure targeted, student-centered instruction.

=== Assessment of Fitness and Motor Skills ===
APE programs often include standardized adapted fitness assessments to evaluate key physical fitness components, such as cardiovascular endurance, muscular strength, flexibility, balance, and motor skill performance. One widely used tool is the Brockport Physical Fitness Test (BPFT), a health-related fitness assessment specifically designed for youth with disabilities. The BPFT provides reliable and contextually appropriate data to inform instructional strategies and identify areas for targeted intervention.

=== Ongoing Performance Assessment ===
In addition to standardized assessments, formative evaluation through ongoing observation is a widely recognized method of assessing student learning in APE. Educators may use tools such as checklists, rating scales, and video recordings to monitor student engagement, skill acquisition, and behavior in real-time. Providing constructive feedback serves not only to motivate students but also to inform adjustments in teaching strategies, enhancing overall instructional effectiveness.

== Results and Impact of Adapted Physical Education ==
Adapted Physical Education (APE) offers a range of benefits for students with disabilities, supporting improvements in physical health, social-emotional well-being, academic performance, and long-term independence. These benefits contribute to enhanced quality of life throughout both school years and adulthood.

=== Physical Health ===
APE programs contribute to improvements in cardiovascular endurance, muscular strength, flexibility, and motor coordination. By promoting regular physical activity, APE may reduce the risk of secondary health conditions such as obesity and Type 2 diabetes, which are more prevalent among individuals with disabilities.

=== Social-Emotional Development ===
Participation in inclusive physical education activities has been associated with improved self-image, reduced anxiety, and strengthened peer relationships. APE environments designed for inclusivity can foster a sense of belonging and promote the development of social skills.

=== Academic Achievement ===
Regular participation in physical activity through APE may enhance cognitive functioning, attention span, and classroom behavior. These improvements can contribute to greater student engagement and academic success, particularly among students with developmental disabilities.

=== Independence and Quality of Life in Adulthood ===
APE provides students with the foundational skills needed for lifelong physical activity and self-directed engagement in recreational and fitness opportunities. Research has shown that participation in adapted sports and physical education is linked to increased independence and improved quality of life in adulthood among individuals with intellectual and developmental disabilities.
