= Computer science in sport =

Interdisciplinary study of informatics and sports science

Computer science in sport is an interdisciplinary discipline that has its goal in combining the theoretical as well as practical aspects and methods of the areas of informatics and sport science. The main emphasis of the interdisciplinarity is placed on the application and use of computer-based, but also mathematical techniques in sport science, aiming in this way at the support and advancement of theory and practice in sports. The reason computer science has become an important partner for sport science is mainly connected with "the fact that the use of data and media, the design of models, the analysis of systems etc. increasingly requires the support of suitable tools and concepts which are developed and available in computer science".

== Historical background ==
Computers in sports were used for the first time in the 1960s, when the main purpose was to accumulate sports information. Databases were created and expanded in order to launch documentation and dissemination of publications like articles or books that contain any kind of knowledge related to sports science. In the mid-1970s, IASI (International Association for Sports Information) was formally established, the first organization in this area. Congresses and meetings were organized more often with the aim of standardization and rationalization of sports documentation. Since at that time this area was less computer-oriented, specialists talk about sports information rather than sports informatics when mentioning the beginning of this field of science.

Based on the progress of computer science and the invention of more powerful computer hardware in the 1970s, also the real history of computer science in sport began. This was as well the first time when this term was officially used and the initiation of an evolution in sports science.

In the early stages of this area statistics on biomechanical data, like different kinds of forces or rates, played a major role. Scientists started to analyze sports games by collecting and looking at such values and features in order to interpret them. Later on, with the continuous improvement of computer hardware — in particular microprocessor speed – many new scientific and computing paradigms were introduced, which were also integrated in computer science in sport. Specific examples are modeling as well as simulation, but also pattern recognition, and design.

As another result of this development, the term 'computer science in sport' has been added in the encyclopedia of sports science in 2004.

== Areas of research ==
The influence of computer science as an interdisciplinary partner for sport and sport science can be shown by the research activities in computer science in sport. The following IT concepts are thereby of particular interest:

- Data acquisition and data processing
- Databases and expert systems
- Modelling (mathematical, IT based, biomechanical, physiological)
- Simulation (interactive, animation etc.)
- Presentation

Based on the fields from above, the main areas of research in computer science in sport include amongst others:

- Training and coaching
- Biomechanics
- Sports equipment and technology
- Computer-aided applications (software, hardware) in sports
- Ubiquitous computing in sports
- Multimedia and Internet
- Documentation
- Education

== Research communities ==
Research in computer science is sport is conducted around the world. Since the 1990s, many new national and international organizations regarding the topic of computer science in sport were established. These associations regularly organize congresses and workshops with the aim of dissemination as well as exchange of scientific knowledge and information on topics regarding their interdisciplinary discipline.

=== Historical survey ===
As a first example, in Australia and New Zealand scientists have built up the MathSport group of ANZIAM (Australia and New Zealand Industrial and Applied Mathematics), which since 1992 organizes biennial meetings, initially under the name "Mathematics and Computers in Sport Conferences", and now "MathSport". Main topics are mathematical models and computer applications in sports, as well as coaching and teaching methods based on informatics.

The European community was also amongst the leading motors of the emergence of the field. Some workshops on this topic were successfully organized in Germany since the late 1980s. In 1997 the first international meeting on computer science in sport was held in Cologne. The main aim was to spread out and share applications, ideas and concepts of the use of computers in sports, which should also make a contribution to the creation of internationalization and thus to boost research work in this area.

Since then, such international symposia took place every two years all over Europe. As the first conferences were a raving success, it was decided to go even further and the foundation of an organization was the logical consequence. This step was accomplished in 2003, when the International Association of Computer Science in Sport (IACSS) was established during the 4th international symposium in Barcelona, when Prof. Jürgen Perl was also chosen as the first president. A few years earlier, the first international e-journal on this topic (International Journal of Computer Science in Sport) was released. The internationalization is confirmed moreover by the fact that three conferences already took place outside of Europe - in Calgary (Canada) in 2007, Canberra (Australia) in 2009 and Shanghai (China) in 2011. During the symposium in Calgary additionally, the president position changed - it has been assigned to Prof. Arnold Baca, who has been re-elected in 2009 and 2011. The following Symposia on Computer Science in Sport took place in Europe again, in Istanbul (Turkey) in 2013 and in Loughborough (UK) in 2015. In 2017 the 11th Symposium of Computer Science in Sport took place in Constance (Germany). During the conference in Istanbul Prof. Martin Lames was elected as president of the IACSS. He was re-elected in 2015, 2017 and 2019. The 12th International Symposium of Computer Science in Sports was held in Moscow (Russia) from 8 to 10 July 2019.

=== National organizations ===
In addition to the international associations from above, currently the following national associations on computer science in sport exist:

- Austrian Association of Computer Science in Sport
- British Association of Computer Science in Sport and Exercise
- Chinese Association of Computer Science in Sport
- Croatian Association of Computer Science in Sport
- Section Computer Science in Sport of the German Association of Sport Science
- Swiss Association of Computer Science in Sport SACSS (http://sacss.org)
- Indian Federation of Computer Science in Sport
- Portuguese Association of Computer Science in Sport
- Turkish Association of Computer Science in Sport
- Russian Association of Computer Science in Sport
