= Kinesiogenomics =

Kinesiogenomics refers to the study of genetics in the various disciplines of the field of kinesiology, the study of human movement. The field has also been referred to as "exercise genomics" or "exercisenomics." Areas of study within kinesiogenomics include the role of gene sequence variation (i.e., alleles) in sport performance, identification of genes (and their different alleles) that contribute to the response and adaptation of the body's tissue systems (e.g., muscles, heart, metabolism, etc.) to various exercise-related stimuli, the use of genetic testing to predict sport performance or individualize exercise prescription, and gene doping, the potential for genetic therapy to be used to enhance sport performance.

The field of kinesiogenomics is relatively new, though two books have outlined basic concepts. A regularly published review article entitled, "The human gene map for performance and health-related fitness phenotypes," describes the genes that have been studied in relation to specific exercise- and fitness-related traits. The most recent (seventh) update was published in 2009.

== Research ==
Within the field of kinesiogenomics, several research studies have been conducted in recent years. This increase in research has led to advancements of knowledge in associating how genes and gene sequencing effects a person's exercise habits and health. One study focusing on twins looked to see the effect of genes on exercise ability, the effects of exercise on mood, and the ability to lose weight. The research concluded that genetics had a significant impact of the likelihood an individual would participate in exercise. An increase in participation can be linked to personality factors such as self-motivation and self-discipline, while a lower participation in exercise can be influenced by factors such as anxiety and depression. These personality trait, both positive and negative, can be associated to one's genetic makeup.
