= World Engineering Anthropometry Resource =

International not-for-profit group

World Engineering Anthropometry Resource (WEAR) is an international not-for-profit group that "provides a digital platform for sharing anthropometric data from around the world." It is registered in Europe but its members and partners are from all over the globe. It is made up of “a group of interested experts involved in the application of anthropometry data for design purposes.”

== History ==
WEAR was first proposed in 2000 at an International Ergonomics Association (IEA) meeting. The strategic plan was drafted at the first working meeting in Paris, France in 2002. The first workshop was at the IEA in Seoul, Korea in 2003. Since then there have been working meetings and symposiums in USA, South Africa, Brazil, China, Australia, Canada, The Netherlands, Japan, New Zealand and Spain. WEAR gained support from the International Council for Science (ICSU): Committee on Data for Science and Technology (CODATA) in Berlin, Germany in 2004. Renewal of WEAR as the CODATA Task group for Anthropometric Data and Engineering was made in 2006, 2008, 2010, and 2012. The first WEAR short course was held in Paris in 2008. The website launch of the beta version of the online WEAR resource was at the IEA Congress in Beijing in 2009. The WEAR Conference met in Adelaide in 2011.

To create a searchable resource like WEAR is a mammoth undertaking. A standardization procedure was required to make more than 120 different anthropometric databases searchable and comparable. These databases often had different measurement collection methodologies, some described without much detail, and some in languages other than English. To achieve a workable standard the Anthropometric Measurement Interface (AMI) was created.

A WEAR/CODATA meeting was held on 18 November 2013 in Long Beach, California, USA. During the November 18th meeting those present discussed the new datasets added to the WEAR portal and organised for future uploads. WEAR representatives appointed new officers and made plans to attend the CODATA meeting in India in 2014. WEAR’s President is Dr Kathleen Robinette, Treasurer Dr Régis MOLLARD and Secretary General Dr Daisy Veitch.

== Goals ==
The goals of WEAR are, according to its members, "to provide high-quality data, including anthropometry, tools and applications, for end-users in a self-sustaining way and to provide an educational forum with which to expand the user-base of anthropometric data for design purposes."
