= Pedobarography =

Study of pressure fields between foot and a supporting surface

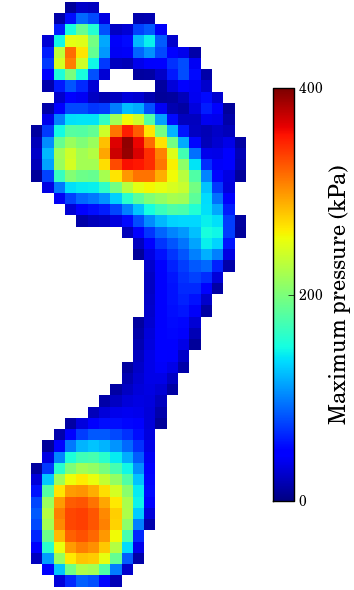
- Example foot pressure distribution; maximum pressures during a single step.
- Test of: gait biomechanics

Pedobarography is the study of pressure fields acting between the plantar surface of the foot and a supporting surface. Used most often for biomechanical analysis of gait and posture, pedobarography is employed in a wide range of applications including sports biomechanics and gait biometrics. The term 'pedobarography' is derived from the Latin: pedes, referring to the foot (as in: pedometer, pedestrian, etc.), and the Greek: baros meaning 'weight' and also 'pressure' (as in: barometer, barograph).

== History ==
The first documented pedobarographic study was published in 1882 and used rubber and ink to record foot pressures. Numerous studies using similar apparatus were conducted in the early- and mid-twentieth century, but it was not until the advent of the personal computer that electronic apparatus were developed and that pedobarography became practical for routine clinical use. It is now used widely to assess and correct a variety of biomechanical and neuropathic disorders.

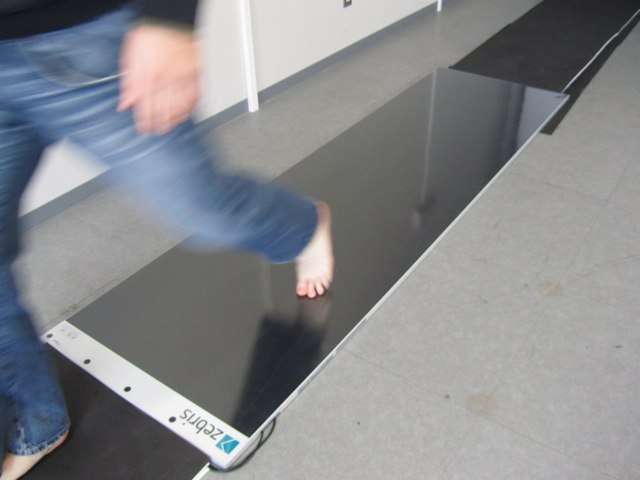
Example floor-based foot pressure measurement device.

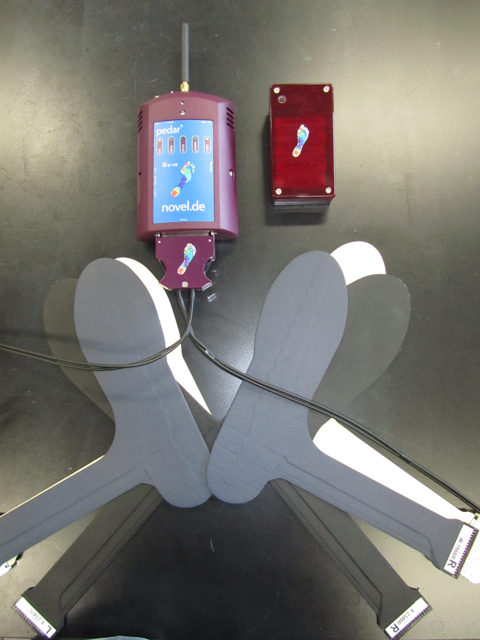
Example insole (in-shoe) foot pressure measurement device.

== Hardware ==
Devices fall into two main categories: (i) floor-based, and (ii) in-shoe. The underlying technology is diverse, ranging from piezoelectric sensor arrays to light refraction, but the ultimate form of the data generated by all modern technologies is either a 2D image or a 2D image time series of the pressures acting under the plantar surface of the foot. Currently, there are several commercial pressure measurement systems and they generally use capacitive or resistive sensors. Studies have shown that capacitive sensors are more valid and reliable than resistive sensors when used continuously for a longer period of time. From these data other variables may be calculated (see Data analysis).

There are a few differences between the types of information you will receive from these two systems, so depending on the application one system might be a better fit. For example, a floor-based system will provide spatial temporal information, like stride length that an in-shoe system cannot provide. Platform systems (or floor-based systems) will also allow for testing of patients with walking aids for assistive devices. However, there is some controversy about evaluating natural gait with a platform system due to patients potentially targeting the platform when walking. This is where an in-shoe system provides an advantage as it reduces the risk of targeting. Users should evaluate carefully the differences between the systems, the patients they will be evaluating and the type of data they are interested in when selecting a system.

The spatial and temporal resolutions of the images generated by commercial pedobarographic systems range from approximately 3 to 10 mm and 25 to 500 Hz, respectively. Finer resolution is limited by sensor technology. Such resolutions yield a contact area of approximately 500 sensors (for a typical adult human foot with surface area of approximately 100 cm^{2}). For a stance phase duration of approximately 0.6 seconds during normal walking, approximately 150,000 pressure values, depending on the hardware specifications, are recorded for each step.

== Data analysis ==
To deal with the large volume of data contained in each pedobarographic record, traditional analyses reduce the data to a more manageable size in three stages: (1) produce anatomical or regional masks, (2) extract regional data, and (3) run statistical tests. Results are typically reported in tabular or bar graph formats. There are also a number of alternative analysis techniques derived from digital image processing methodology. These techniques have also been found to be clinically and biomechanically useful, but traditional regional analyses are most common.

The most commonly analyzed pedobarographic variable is 'peak pressure', or the maximum pressure experienced at each sensor (or pixel, if the sensors fall on a regular square grid) over the duration of the step. Other variables like contact duration, pressure-time integral, center of pressure trajectory, for example, are also relevant to the biomechanical function of the foot.

== Clinical use ==
The most widely researched clinical application of pedobarography is diabetic foot ulceration, a condition which can lead to amputation in extreme cases but for which even mild-to-moderate cases are associated with substantial health care expenditure. Pedobarography is also used in a variety of other clinical situations including: post-surgery biomechanical assessment, intra-operative assessment, orthotics design and assessment of drop-foot surgery. In addition to clinical applications, pedobarography continues to be used in the laboratory to understand the mechanisms governing human gait and posture.

The use of pedobarographs in clinical settings is supported by researchers. According to Bowen, et al., "Pediobarograph measurements can be used to monitor and quantitatively assess the progressive changes of foot deformity over time. Pedobarograph is a reliable measurement that shows little variability between measurements at the same occasion and between measurements on different days."

== Terminology ==
- Dynamic pedobarography refers to the collection and analysis of time series pedobarographic data during dynamic activities like gait.
- Static pedobarography refers to the collection and analysis of time series pedobarographic data during postural (i.e. quasi-static) activities.
