= Participatory ergonomics =

Industrial ergonomics programs seek to identify and correct factors that negatively impact the physical health of their workers. Participatory ergonomics programs seek to maximize the involvement of the workers in this process based on the simple fact that a worker is an expert on his or her job. The participatory approach to ergonomics relies on actively involving workers in implementing ergonomic knowledge, procedures and changes with the intention of improving working conditions, safety, productivity, quality, morale and/or comfort.

== Implementing a participatory ergonomics program in the workplace ==
In order to determine if an ergonomics team/committee is right for a workplace, five factors need to be considered.

=== Resources and Support ===
A successful participatory ergonomics program requires initial and continuing resources and support from the top levels of management within the organization. The resources required include:

- time for the program to develop
- time to develop and implement solutions
- financial resources to make meaningful changes in the workplace
- management support for the individuals on the ergonomics team.

.

=== Ergo Team formation ===
The ergonomics committee should be composed of people with the right mix of skills including technical or engineering knowledge, worker knowledge and input from an ergonomics expert. Successful, sustainable participatory ergonomics programs have an individual on the committee who takes on a leadership or "ergonomics champion" role.

=== Training needs ===
Training principles and methods are central to the success of the participatory ergonomics process. Three major aspects of training should be considered early in the process of implementing a participatory ergonomics program. Initial training in ergonomics for committee members should include ergonomics concepts and tools. Training on topics such as meeting and project management may be beneficial, depending on the past experience of committee members with committee work and implementing change. Additionally, it is important for the workforce as a whole to gain an understanding of ergonomics to improve their support for the participatory ergonomics process.

=== Workplace organization factors ===
The research literature contains limited discussion of the effect of the organization’s characteristics (culture) on the success of a participatory ergonomics intervention. The organizational climate and the timing of the introduction of the program can affect the outcome. Integrating the participatory ergonomics program into existing health and safety programs can increase the chances of success.

=== Involving the workforce in ergonomics ===
The ergonomics committee needs to respond to expectations about the ergonomics program. It is imperative to gain support or "buy in" from the workforce as most will not be directly involved with the ergonomics committee. The ergonomics program needs to be visible within the organization; this can be accomplished by ensuring that there is a focused effort to communicate with the workforce and by involving key stakeholders in all changes that are investigated and implemented.

== See also ==
- Ergonomics
- Job satisfaction
- Occupational health and safety
- Public participation
- Worker health and safety
