= Heuristics and sports =

Decision-making strategies used in sports

Heuristics are simple strategies for decision making that are used to achieve a specific goal quickly and efficiently, and are commonly implemented in sports. Many sports require the ability to make fast decisions under time pressure, and the proper use of heuristics is essential for many of these decisions. Psychological factors may also influence decision-making strategies in sport. A study of junior athletes reported that participants with signs of mixed anxiety-depressive disorder relied more frequently on avoidant decision-making patterns, whereas vigilance was associated with more adaptive decision-making.

For example, how should a soccer player decide whether to shoot for a goal or to pass the ball, and to whom to pass it? How do basketball coaches decide which player should shoot the last shot? In such conditions, athletes, coaches, and referees have no time to consider the elaborate details relating to the decision being made. Instead, they use simple strategies based on limited information.

In addition, some sports skills, like catching a ball in baseball, can be performed successfully by following simple rules and heuristic techniques despite the computationally complex details involved in the action.

== Efficient heuristics ==
The following table provides a list of efficient heuristics for decision making in sports:

Heuristic	Rule	Function	Bets on
Gaze heuristic	"(1) Fixate one's gaze on the ball, (2) start running, (3) adjust one's speed so that the angle of gaze remains constant."	Catching a fly ball	Ball is on descent and the trajectory is in line with the catcher
Take-the-first	"Chose the first option that comes to mind"	Making allocation decisions	Good options are generated faster than bad ones
Recognition heuristic	"Choose the recognized option"	Forecasting the winner in a competition	More successful athletes or teams are more likely to be recognized
Take-the-best	"(1) Search through cues in order of their validity, (2) stop search if a cue discriminates between the objects, (3) predict that the object with a positive cue value has the higher criterion value."	Forecasting the winner in a competition	Skewed distribution of cue weights
Hot-hand heuristic	"If an athlete scores two or more times in a row, predict she will score on her next attempt."	Making allocation decisions	Good players show streaks more frequently than bad players

== Gaze heuristic ==
The gaze heuristic is used by humans and animals for catching flying objects. It entails the fixation of one's gaze to the object and adjustment of the running speed so that the angle of the gaze remains constant while approaching the object (see the three decision rules in the table above). Empirical evidence shows that experienced ball-catchers use the gaze heuristic and similar heuristics, as do dogs when trying to catch Frisbees.

== Take-the-first ==
Take-the-first (TTF) is a heuristics that can be used by players to choose among practical options. There is evidence that experienced players do not try to exhaustively generate all possible options. Instead, they seem to rely on the order in which options are spontaneously generated in a particular situation and choose the first option that comes to mind.

== Recognition heuristic ==
Recognition heuristic relies on partial ignorance to make powerful inferences. It is based on the rule: "If one of two objects is recognized and the other is not, then infer that the recognized object has the higher value with respect to the criterion." A study on prediction of the outcomes of matches in the 2005 Wimbledon Gentlemen's tennis competition showed that predictions based on recognition were equal to or better than predictions based on official ATP rankings and the seedings of Wimbledon experts, while online betting odds led to more accurate forecasts.

== Take-the-best ==
Take-the-best (TTB) is a heuristic for making inferences about known options based on limited search. Take the best search cues in order of their validity, beginning with the most valid cue. If this cue discriminates between the two objects being compared, the information search is ended and the object with the higher value on this cue is inferred to have a higher criterion value. If the cue does not discriminate between the objects, TTB moves on the next most valid cue, continuing down the line of cues in order of validity until it comes upon a cue that does discriminate. Some evidence from basketball (NBA) demonstrates that TTB can predict the game results as well as an optimizing model based on Bayes' rule.

== Hot-hand heuristic ==
Hot-hand heuristic is related to a belief in the hot-hand phenomenon. Namely, people, including athletes themselves, think that a player who had a successful streak of attempts is more likely to succeed in subsequent attempts. Hot-hand heuristic is used for making allocation decisions. For instance, playmakers and coaches use it in organizing the game by distributing more balls to players who are on a winning streak, or to organize a better defense against those players.

However, the hot hand phenomenon is fairly controversial. Some evidence from basketball supports the argument that the hot-hand belief is an illusion based on people's systematic misjudgment of random sequences. In contrast, recent studies from volleyball suggest that belief in the hot-hand is justified and hence useful for making good allocation decisions in the game.
