= Contact area =

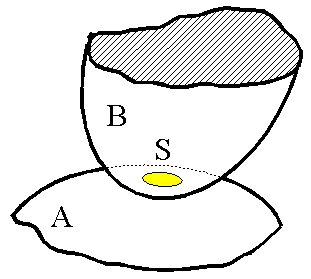
Objects A and B touching at contact area S

When two objects touch, only a certain portion of their surface areas will be in contact with each other. This area of true contact, most often constitutes only a very small fraction of the apparent or nominal contact area. In relation to two contacting objects, the contact area is the part of the nominal area that consists of atoms of one object in true contact with the atoms of the other object. Because objects are never perfectly flat due to asperities, the actual contact area (on a microscopic scale) is usually much less than the contact area apparent on a macroscopic scale. Contact area may depend on the normal force between the two objects due to deformation.

The contact area depends on the geometry of the contacting bodies, the load, and the material properties. The contact area between the two parallel cylinders is a narrow rectangle. Two, non-parallel cylinders have an elliptical contact area, unless the cylinders are crossed at 90 degrees, in which case they have a circular contact area. Two spheres also have a circular contact area.

== Friction and contact area ==
It is an empirical fact for many materials that F = μN, where F is the frictional force for sliding friction, μ is the coefficient of friction, and N is the normal force. There is not a simple derivation for sliding friction's independence from area.

== Methods for determining contact area ==
One way of determining the actual contact area is to determine it indirectly through a physical process that depends on contact area. For example, the resistance of a wire is dependent on the cross-sectional area, so one may find the contact area of a metal by measuring the current that flows through that area (through the surface of an electrode to another electrode, for example.)

== See also ==
- Contact mechanics
- Contact resistance
