= Kinanthropometry =

Study of human growth and performance

Kinanthropometry is defined as the study of human size, shape, proportion, composition, maturation, and gross function, in order to understand growth, exercise, performance, and nutrition.

It is a scientific discipline that is concerned with the measurement of individuals in a variety of morphological perspectives, its application to movement and those factors which influence movement, including: components of body build, body measurements, proportions, composition, shape and maturation; motor abilities and cardiorespiratory capacities; physical activity including recreational activity as well as highly specialized sports performance. The predominant focus is upon obtaining detailed measurements upon the body composition of a given person.

Kinanthropometry is the interface between human anatomy and movement. It is the application of a series of measurements made on the body and from these we can use the data that we gather directly or perform calculations using the data to produce various indices and body composition predictions and to measure and describe physique.

Kinanthropometry is an unknown word for many people except those inside the field of sport science. Describing the etymology of the word kinanthropometry can help illustrate simply what you are going to talk about. However, if you have to say just a few sentences about the general scope of it, some problems will arise immediately. Is it a science? Why are its central definitions so ambiguous and various? For what really matter the kinanthropometric assessment. And so on.

Defining a particular aim for kinanthropometry is central for its full understanding. Ross et al. (1972) said “K is a scientific discipline that studies the body size, the proportionality, the performance of movement, the body composition and principal functions of the body. This so well cited definition is not completely exact as the last four words show. What are the kinanthropometric methods that truly tell us something about principal functions of the body? In principle an amount or distribution of fat mass or muscular mass could be correlated or show a level of causation with any disease. The morpho-physiological mechanisms involved in those explanations are big enigmas today. Few diseases are in practice diagnosed using anthropometric measures and body composition methods at any public health care system. The use of body composition outcomes for predicting health status due to their associations with a lot of physiological variables is valid. However, this purpose is not included within the kinanthropometric perspective because the absence of movement prediction's probability in those diagnoses. The countless uses of some of its fundamental methods have to be accepted but they should not change the theoretical core of the scientific discipline. On the other hand, this definition omits some important objectives of quantifying the body that are an indelible part of its frame; for example: the study of human shape using the method of the anthropometric somatotype of Carter and Heath (1990). Besides that, the performance of movement is why one studies the body size, proportionality, body composition, and human shape. It is confusing to write at the same level the performance of movement because then one never clearly portrays the purpose of the discipline, meaning that a descriptive knowledge of the body is the sole purpose while you are mixing the real scope in the statement.

Stewart (2010) defined kinanthropometry as "The academic discipline that involves the use of anthropometric measures in relation to other scientific parameters and/or thematic areas such as human movement, physiology or applied health sciences".

For Betancourt (2009), kinanthropometry is a scientific discipline of biomechanics that can be defined as: the set of theoretical assumptions that explain the relationships between the morpho-functional structure of healthy individuals and their biological potentiality of performing an efficient motion in an ontogenic moment.
