= Human height =

Aspect of human growth

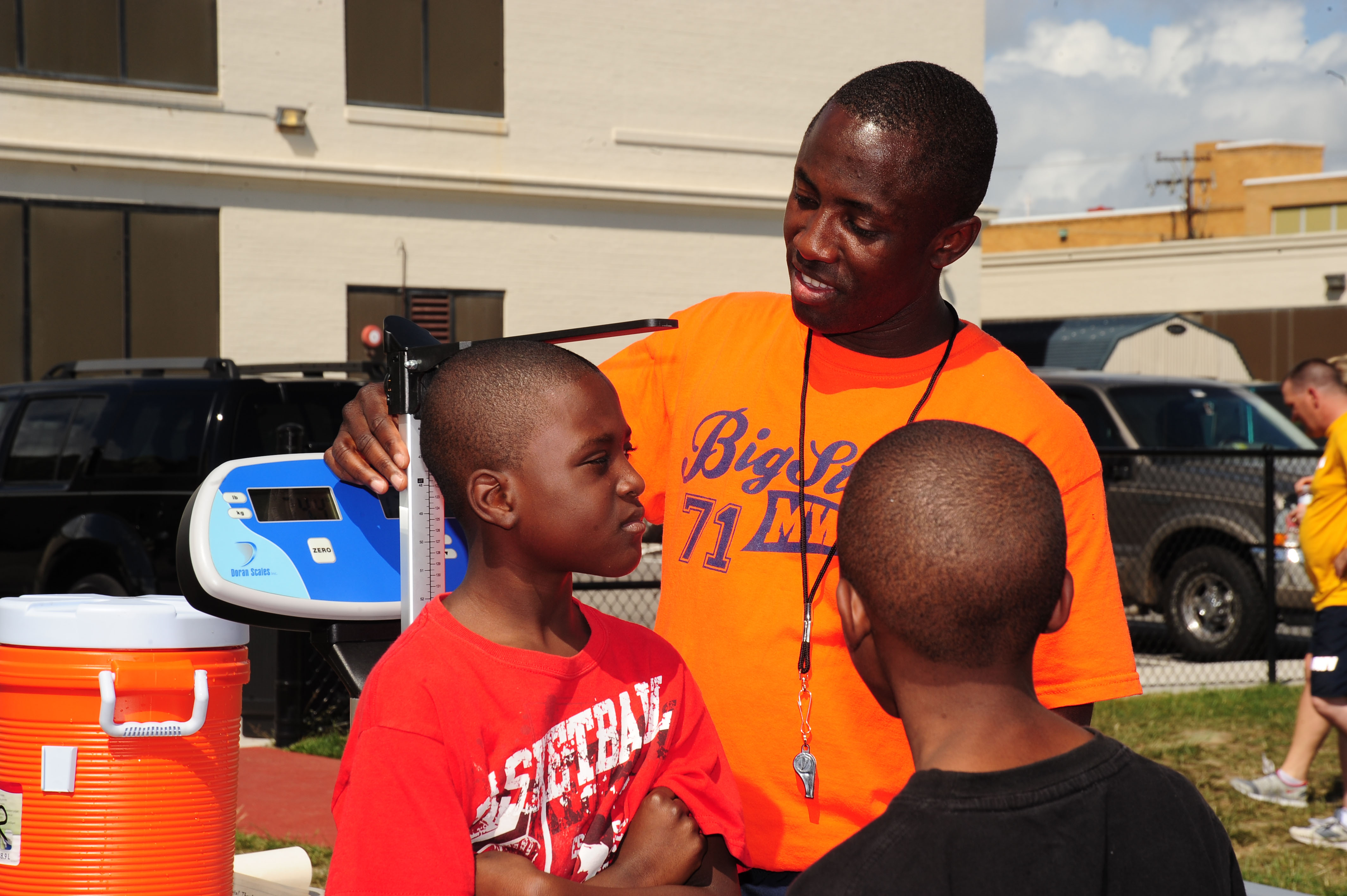
Height measurement using a stadiometer

Human height or stature is the distance from the bottom of the feet to the top of the head in a human body, standing erect. It is measured using a stadiometer, in centimetres when using the metric system or SI system, or feet and inches when using United States customary units or the imperial system. In the early phase of anthropometric research history, questions about height measuring techniques for measuring nutritional status often concerned genetic differences.

Height is also important because it is closely correlated with other health components, such as life expectancy. Studies show that there is a correlation between small stature and a longer life expectancy. Individuals of small stature are also more likely to have lower blood pressure and are less likely to acquire cancer. Short stature decreases the risk of venous insufficiency.

When populations share genetic backgrounds and environmental factors, average height is frequently characteristic within the group. Exceptional height variation (around 20% deviation from average) within such a population is sometimes due to gigantism or dwarfism, which are medical conditions caused by specific genes or endocrine abnormalities.

There are many pathological processes, both inherited and acquired, but the heights of many exceptional (>2 standard deviations from the mean) individuals are considered as natural variants. When no cause can be identified the deviation may be benign or pathological, and is considered idiopathic tall or short stature. When inheritance is concluded as the cause, as a natural variant, of exceptional height the term is familial tall or short stature. A variant related to familial stature, and sometimes used synonymously, and in some cases to distinguish height of a juvenile that is at a particular age significantly above or below average but is ultimately expected to become near average adult height is constitutional tall or short stature.

The development of human height can serve as an indicator of two key welfare components, namely nutritional quality and health. In regions of poverty or warfare, environmental factors like chronic malnutrition during childhood or adolescence may result in delayed growth and/or marked reductions in adult stature even without the presence of any of these medical conditions.

== Determinants of growth ==
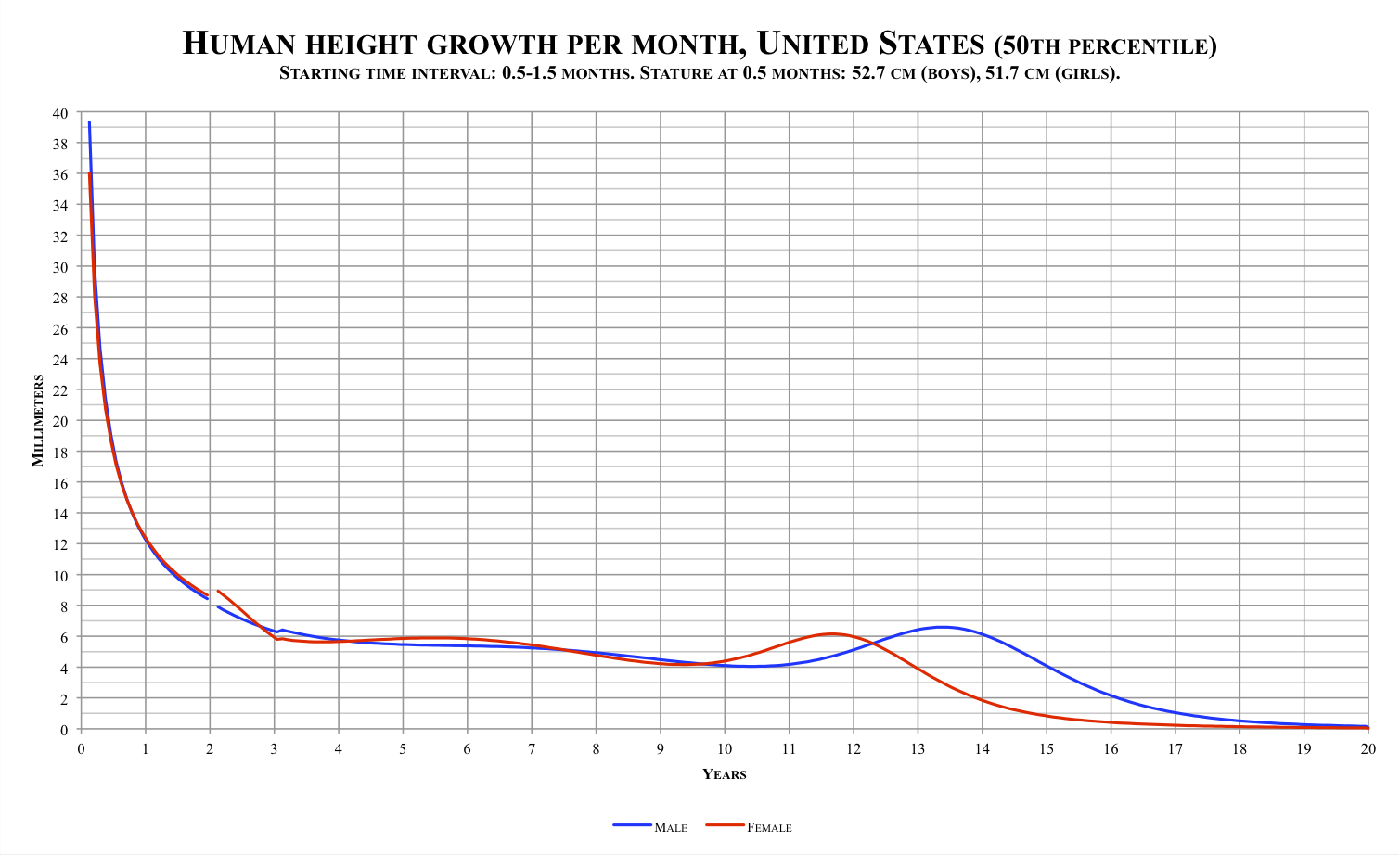
The median (50th percentile) growth curves for males and females 0−20 years in the United States

The study of height is known as auxology. Growth has long been recognized as a measure of the health of individuals, hence part of the reasoning for the use of growth charts. For individuals, as indicators of health problems, growth trends are tracked for significant deviations, and growth is also monitored for significant deficiency from genetic expectations. Genetics is a major factor in determining the height of individuals, though it is far less influential regarding differences among populations. Average height is relevant to the measurement of the health and wellness standard of living and quality of life of populations.

Outside the womb, humans grow fastest as infants and toddlers, rapidly declining from a maximum at birth to roughly age 2, tapering to a slowly declining rate, and then, during the pubertal growth spurt (with an average girl starting her puberty and pubertal growth spurt at 10 years and an average boy starting his puberty and pubertal growth spurt at 12 years), a rapid rise to a second maximum (at around 11−12 years for an average female, and 13−14 years for an average male), followed by a steady decline to zero. The average female growth rate decays off to zero at about 15 or 16 years, whereas the average male curve continues for approximately 3 more years, going to zero at about 18−19, although there is limited research to suggest minor height growth after the age of 19 in males. These are also critical periods where stressors such as malnutrition (or even severe child neglect) have the greatest effect.

Moreover, the health of a mother throughout her life, especially during her critical period and pregnancy, has a role. A healthier child and adult develops a body that is better able to provide optimal prenatal conditions. The pregnant mother's health is essential for herself but also the fetus as gestation is itself a critical period for an embryo/fetus, though some problems affecting height during this period are resolved by catch-up growth assuming childhood conditions are good. Thus, there is a cumulative generation effect such that nutrition and health over generations influence the height of descendants to varying degrees.

The age of the mother also has some influence on her child's height. Studies in modern times have observed a gradual increase in height with maternal age, though these early studies suggest that trend is due to various socio-economic situations that select certain demographics as being more likely to have a first birth early in the mother's life. These same studies show that children born to a young mother are more likely to have below-average educational and behavioral development, again suggesting an ultimate cause of resources and family status rather than a purely biological explanation.

In 1988, it was observed that first-born males were shorter than later-born males. However, in 2013, the reverse observation was made. The study authors suggest that the cause may be socioeconomic in nature.

Average height of men for selected countries

Average height of women. The image from data in 1996 states the average height index of only women around the world, in accordance to the shade of blue and green.

Average height of men. The image from data recorded in 1996 states the average height index of only men around the world, in accordance to the shade of green.

Male to female height ratio

Annual change in average female height

=== Genetics ===
The precise relationship between genetics and environment is complex and uncertain. Differences in human height is 60−80% heritable, according to several twin studies and has been considered polygenic since the Mendelian–biometrician debate a hundred years ago. A genome-wide association (GWA) study of more than 180,000 individuals has identified hundreds of genetic variants in at least 180 loci associated with adult human height. The number of individuals has since been expanded to 253,288 individuals and the number of genetic variants identified is 697 in 423 genetic loci. In a separate study of body proportion using sitting-height ratio, it reports that these 697 variants can be partitioned into three specific classes: (1) variants that primarily determine leg length, (2) variants that primarily determine spine and head length, or (3) variants that affect overall body size. This gives insights into the biological mechanisms underlying how these 697 genetic variants affect overall height. These loci do not only determine height, but other features or characteristics. As an example, 4 of the 7 loci identified for intracranial volume had previously been discovered for human height. Height, like other phenotypic traits, is determined by a combination of genetics and environmental factor. A child's height based on parental heights is subject to regression toward the mean, therefore extremely tall or short parents will likely have correspondingly taller or shorter offspring, but their offspring will also likely be closer to average height than the parents themselves. Genetic potential and several hormones, minus illness, is a basic determinant for height. Other factors include the genetic response to external factors such as diet, exercise, environment, and life circumstances.

=== Environmental and epigenetic effects ===
The effect of environment on height is illustrated by studies performed by anthropologist Barry Bogin and coworkers of Guatemala Mayan children living in the United States. In the early 1970s, when Bogin first visited Guatemala, he observed that Mayan Indian men averaged 157 cm (5 ft 2 in) in height and the women averaged 142 cm (4 ft 8 in). Bogin took another series of measurements after the Guatemalan Civil War, during which up to a million Guatemalans fled to the United States. He discovered that Maya refugees, who ranged from six to twelve years old, were significantly taller than their Guatemalan counterparts. By 2000, the American Maya were 10.24 centimetres (4.0 in) taller than the Guatemalan Maya of the same age, largely due to better nutrition and health care. Bogin also noted that American Maya children had relatively longer legs, averaging 7.02 centimetres (2.8 in) longer than the Guatemalan Maya (a significantly lower sitting height ratio).

The Nilotic peoples of Sudan such as the Shilluk and Dinka have been described as some of the tallest in the world. Dinka Ruweng males investigated by Roberts in 1953−1954 were on average 181 cm (5 ft 11 in) tall, and Shilluk males averaged 182 cm (6 ft 0 in). The Nilotic people are characterized as having long legs, narrow bodies and short trunks, an adaptation to hot weather. However, male Dinka and Shilluk refugees measured in 1995 in Southwestern Ethiopia were on average only 176 cm (5 ft 9 in) and 172 cm (5 ft 8 in) tall, respectively. As the study points out, Nilotic people "may attain greater height if privileged with favourable environmental conditions during early childhood and adolescence, allowing full expression of the genetic material." Before fleeing, these refugees were subject to privation as a consequence of the succession of civil wars in their country from 1955 to the present.

Attributed as a significant reason for the trend of increasing height in parts of Europe are the egalitarian populations where proper medical care and adequate nutrition had been relatively equally distributed as of 2004. The uneven distribution of nutritional resources makes it more plausible for individuals with better access to resources to grow taller, while individuals with worse access to resources have a lessened chance of growing taller.

Changes in diet (nutrition) and a general rise in quality of health care and standard of living are the cited factors in Asian populations. Malnutrition including chronic undernutrition and acute malnutrition is known to have caused stunted growth in various populations. This has been seen in North Korea, parts of Africa, certain historical Europe, and other populations. Developing countries such as Guatemala have rates of stunting in children under 5 living as high as 82.2% in Totonicapán, and 49.8% nationwide.

Average height in a nation is correlated with protein quality. Nations that consume more protein in the form of meat, dairy, eggs, and fish tend to be taller, while those that obtain more protein from cereals tend to be shorter. Therefore, populations with high cattle per capita and high consumption of dairy live longer and are taller. Historically, this can be seen in the cases of the United States, Argentina, New Zealand and Australia in the beginning of the 19th century. Moreover, when the production and consumption of milk and beef is taken to consideration, it can be seen why the Germanic people who lived outside of the Roman Empire were taller than those who lived at its heart.

== Role for an individual ==
Male Stature vs Age (US CDC)

Female Stature vs Age (US CDC)

=== Connection to health ===
Studies show that there is a correlation between small stature and a longer life expectancy. Individuals of small stature are also more likely to have lower blood pressure and are less likely to acquire cancer. The University of Hawaii has found that the "longevity gene" FOXO3 that reduces the effects of aging is more commonly found in individuals of a small body size. Short stature decreases the risk of venous insufficiency. Certain studies have shown that height is a factor in overall health while some suggest tallness is associated with better cardiovascular health and shortness with longevity. Cancer risk has also been found to grow with height. Moreover, scientists have also observed a protective effect of height on risk for Alzheimer's disease, although this fact could be a result of the genetic overlap between height and intracranial volume and there are also genetic variants influencing height that could affect biological mechanisms involved in Alzheimer's disease etiology, such as insulin-like growth factor 1 (IGF-1).

Nonetheless, modern westernized interpretations of the relationship between height and health fail to account for the observed height variations worldwide. Cavalli-Sforza, L.L., and Cavalli-Sforza, F., note that variations in height worldwide can be partly attributed to evolutionary pressures resulting from differing environments. These evolutionary pressures result in height-related health implications. While tallness is an adaptive benefit in colder climates such as those found in Europe, shortness helps dissipate body heat in warmer climatic regions. Consequently, the relationships between health and height cannot be easily generalized since tallness and shortness can both provide health benefits in different environmental settings.

In the end, being excessively tall can cause various medical problems, including cardiovascular problems, because of the increased load on the heart to supply the body with blood, and problems resulting from the increased time it takes the brain to communicate with the extremities. For example, Robert Wadlow, the tallest human known to verifiable history, developed difficulty in walking as his height increased throughout his life. In many of the pictures of the latter portion of his life, Wadlow can be seen gripping an object for support. Late in his life (although he died at age 22), he had to wear braces on his legs and walk with a cane, and he died after developing an infection in his legs because he was unable to feel the irritation and cutting caused by his leg braces.

Sources are in disagreement about the overall relationship between height and longevity. Samaras and Elrick, in the Western Journal of Medicine, demonstrate an inverse correlation between height and longevity in several mammals including humans. Women whose height is under 150 cm (4 ft 11 in) may have a small pelvis, resulting in such complications during childbirth as shoulder dystocia. A study done in Sweden in 2005 has shown that there is a strong inverse correlation between height and suicide among Swedish men.

A large body of human and animal evidence indicates that shorter, smaller bodies age more slowly, and have fewer chronic diseases and greater longevity. For example, a study found eight areas of support for the "smaller lives longer" thesis. These areas of evidence include studies involving longevity, life expectancy, centenarians, male vs. female longevity differences, mortality advantages of shorter people, survival findings, smaller body size due to calorie restriction, and within-species body size differences. They all support the conclusion that smaller individuals live longer in healthy environments and with good nutrition. However, the difference in longevity is modest. Several human studies have found a loss of 0.5 years/centimeter of increased height (1.2 yr/inch). But these findings do not mean that all tall people die young. Many live to advanced ages and some become centenarians.

In medicine, height is measured to monitor child development, this is a better indicator of growth than weight in the long term. For older people, excessive height loss is a symptom of osteoporosis. Height is also used to compute indicators like body surface area or body mass index.

=== Occupational success ===
There is a large body of research in psychology, economics, and human biology that has assessed the relationship between several physical features (e.g. body height) and occupational success. The correlation between height and success was explored decades ago. Shorter people are considered to have an advantage in certain sports (e.g. gymnastics, race car driving, etc.), whereas in many other sports taller people have a major advantage. In most occupational fields, body height is not relevant to how well people are able to perform; nonetheless several studies found that success was positively correlated with body height, although there may be other factors such as sex or socioeconomic status that are correlated with height which may account for the difference in success.

A demonstration of the height-success association can be found in the realm of politics. In the United States presidential elections, the taller candidate won 22 out of 25 times in the 20th century. Nevertheless, Ignatius Loyola, founder of the Jesuits, was 150 cm (4 ft 11 in) and several prominent world leaders of the 20th century, such as Vladimir Lenin, Benito Mussolini, Nicolae Ceaușescu, and Joseph Stalin were of below-average height.

=== Extremes ===
The tallest living man is Sultan Kösen of Turkey at 251 cm (8 ft 3 in), and the tallest living woman is Rumeysa Gelgi, also of Turkey, at 215 cm (7 ft 1 in). The tallest man in modern history was Robert Wadlow (1918−1940), from Illinois, United States, who was 272 cm (8 ft 11 in) at the time of his death. The tallest woman in modern history was Zeng Jinlian (1964−1982) of China, who measured 246 cm (8 ft 1 in) at the time of her death. The shortest adult human on record was Chandra Bahadur Dangi (1939−2015) of Nepal at 55 cm (1 ft 10 in).

Until the wedding of former Chinese professional basketball player Sun Mingming on 4 August 2013, the tallest living married couple were ex-basketball players Yao Ming and Ye Li (both of China), standing at 229 cm (7 ft 6 in) and 190 cm (6 ft 3 in) respectively, giving a combined height of 419 cm (13 ft 9 in). They married in Shanghai, China, on 6 August 2007.

== Pre-modern period ==
Average human height in the Eastern Mediterranean from the Upper Paleolithic (before 16,000 BC) period, through to 1996

Average adult height by year of birth, World

Annual change in average female height by year of birth

Annual change in average male height by year of birth

In general, modern humans living in developed countries are taller than their ancient counterparts, but this was not always the case.

=== Pre-modern times ===
Certain ancient human populations were quite tall, even surpassing the average height of the tallest of modern countries. For instance, certain hunter-gatherer populations living in Europe during the Paleolithic Era and India during the Mesolithic Period averaged heights of around 183 cm (6 ft 0 in) for males, and 172 cm (5 ft 8 in) for females. Human height worldwide sharply declined with the advent of the Neolithic Revolution, likely due to significantly less protein consumption by agriculturalists as compared with hunter-gatherers.

During the Bronze Age, height varied significantly by region. The people of the Indus Valley Civilization were among the tallest in the world, with an average height of 176 cm (5 ft 9 in) for males and 166 cm (5 ft 5 in) for females. The people of Ancient Egypt stood around 167 cm (5 ft 6 in) for males and 157 cm (5 ft 2 in) for females. The Ancient Greeks averaged 166 cm (5 ft 5 in) for males and 154 cm (5 ft 1 in) for females. The Romans were slightly taller, with an average height of 169 cm (5 ft 7 in) for males and 158 cm (5 ft 2 in) for females.

=== 18th century ===
In the first half of the eighteenth century, the average height of an English male was 165 cm (5 ft 5 in), and the average height of an Irish male was 168 cm (5 ft 6 in), according to a study by economist John Komlos and Francesco Cinnirella. The estimated mean height of English, German, and Scottish soldiers was 163 cm (5 ft 4 in) − 165 cm (5 ft 5 in) for the period as a whole, while that of Irish was 167 cm (5 ft 6 in). The average height of male slaves and convicts in North America was 171 cm (5 ft 7 in).

Before the mid-nineteenth century, there were cycles in height, with periods of increase and decrease; however, apart from the decline associated with the transition to agriculture, examinations of skeletons show no significant differences in height from the Neolithic Revolution through the early 1800s.

=== 19th century ===
In the eighteenth and nineteenth centuries, people of European descent in North America were far taller than those in Europe and were one of the tallest in the world. The original indigenous population of Plains Native Americans was also among the tallest populations of the world at the time. Some studies also suggest that there existed the correlation between the height and the real wage, moreover, the correlation was higher among the less developed countries. The difference in height between children from different social classes was already observed by the age of two.

The average height of Americans and Europeans decreased during periods of rapid industrialization, possibly due to rapid population growth and broad decreases in economic status. This has become known as the early-industrial growth puzzle (in the U.S. context, the Antebellum Puzzle). In England, during the early nineteenth century, the difference between the average height of English upper-class youth (students of Sandhurst Military Academy) and English working-class youth (Marine Society boys) reached 22 cm (8.7 in), the highest that has been observed.

In general, there were no significant differences in regional height levels throughout the nineteenth century. The only exceptions to this rather uniform height distribution were people in the Anglo-Saxon settlement regions who were taller than the average and people from Southeast Asia with below-average heights. However, at the end of the nineteenth century and in the middle of the first globalization period, heights between rich and poor countries began to diverge. These differences did not disappear in the deglobalization period of the two World wars. In 2014, Baten and Blum found that in the nineteenth century, important determinants of height were the local availability of cattle, meat and milk as well as the local disease environment. In the late twentieth century, however, technologies and trade became more important, decreasing the impact of local availability of agricultural products.

==== Netherlands ====
Data derived from burials show that before 1850, the mean stature of males and females in Leiden, Netherlands, was respectively 167 cm (5 ft 6 in) and 156 cm (5 ft 1 in). The average height of 19-year-old Dutch orphans in 1865 was 160 cm (5 ft 3 in).

From 1830 to 1857, the average height of a Dutch person decreased, even while Dutch real GNP per capita was growing at an average rate of more than 0.5% per year. The worst decline was in urban areas that in 1847, the urban height penalty was 2.5 cm (1.0 in). Urban mortality was also much higher than in rural regions. In 1829, the average urban and rural Dutchman was 164 cm (5 ft 5 in). By 1856, the average rural Dutchman was 162 cm (5 ft 4 in) and urban Dutchman was 158 cm (5 ft 2 in).

In the late nineteenth century, the Netherlands was a land renowned for its short population, but as of 2012, Dutch people were among the world's tallest, with young men averaging 183 cm (6 ft 0 in) tall.

== Modern period ==
In the 150 years since the mid-nineteenth century, the average human height in industrialised countries has increased by up to 10 cm (3.9 in). However, these increases appear to have largely levelled off.

A 2004 report citing a 2003 UNICEF study on the effects of malnutrition in North Korea, due to "successive famines," found young adult males to be significantly shorter. In contrast South Koreans "feasting on an increasingly Western-influenced diet," without famine, were growing taller. The height difference is minimal for Koreans over forty years old, who grew up at a time when economic conditions in the North were roughly comparable to those in the South, while height disparities are most acute for Koreans who grew up in the mid-1990s a demographic in which South Koreans are about 12 cm (4.7 in) taller than their North Korean counterparts as this was a period during which the North was affected by a harsh famine where hundreds of thousands, if not millions, died of hunger. A study by South Korean anthropologists of North Korean children who had defected to China found that eighteen-year-old males were 12.7 cm (5 in) shorter than South Koreans their age due to malnutrition.

The height of British children is tracked by national child measurement programmes which show that the periods (COVID-19 pandemic) and cohorts (children in deprived areas) in which height increases have been greatest are also those in which obesity increases have been the greatest. This is consistent with obesity having a causative role in increasing child height via hormonal pathways and suggests that when childhood obesity prevalence is prevalent and increasing child height may not be a reliable indicator of child health and improved social conditions.

Adult height between populations often differs significantly. For example, the average height of women from the Czech Republic is greater than that of men from Malawi. This may be caused by genetic differences, childhood lifestyle differences (nutrition, sleep patterns, physical labor), or both.

Depending on sex, genetic, and environmental factors, shrinkage of stature may begin in middle age in some individuals but tends to be universal in the extremely aged. This decrease in height is due to such factors as decreased height of inter-vertebral discs because of desiccation, atrophy of soft tissues, and postural changes secondary to degenerative disease.

Working on data of Indonesia, the study by Baten, Stegl and van der Eng suggests a positive relationship of economic development and average height. In Indonesia, human height has decreased coincidentally with natural or political shocks.

== Average around the world ==
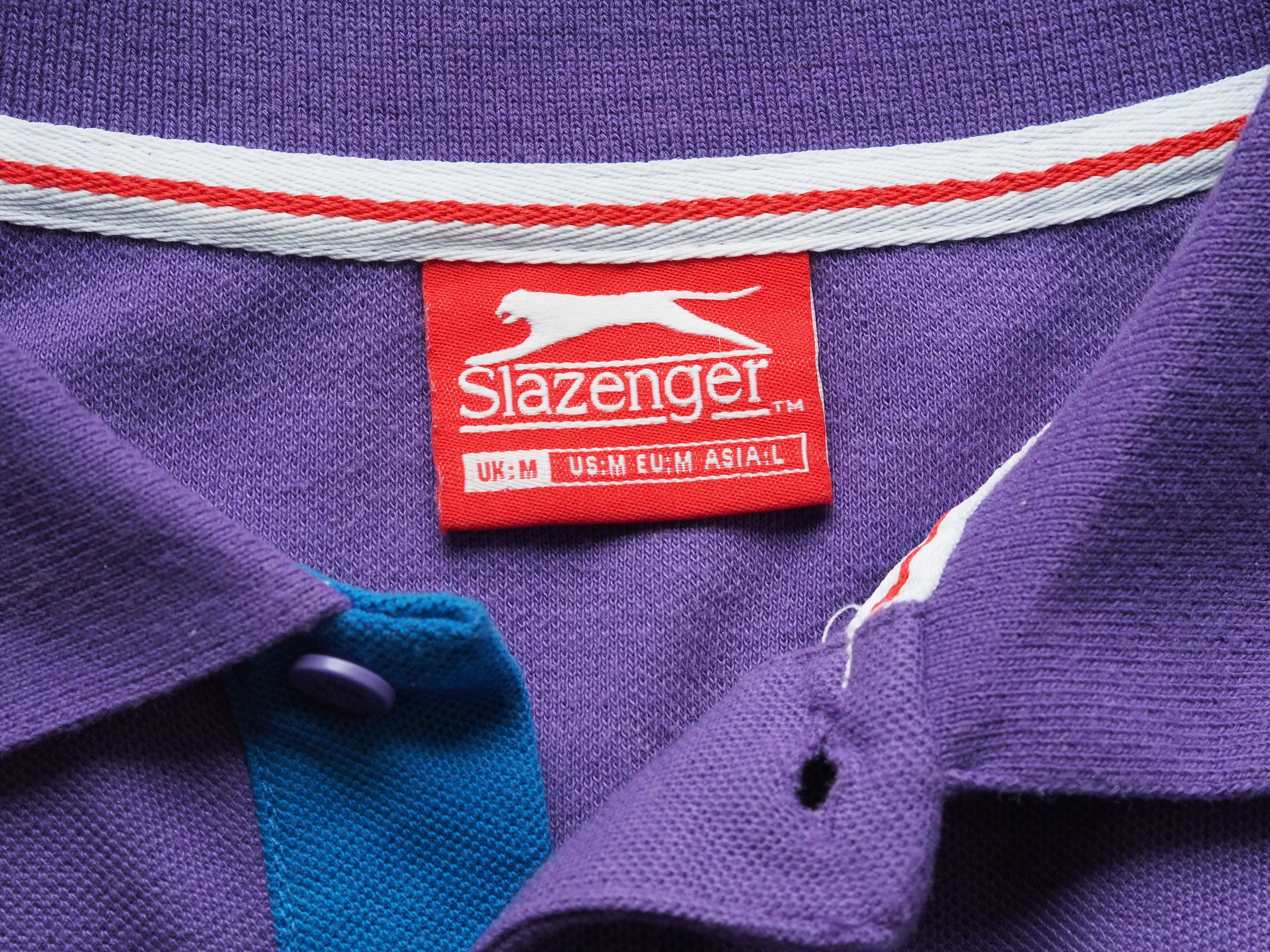
A textile label showing the difference in average height around the world as shown on this polo shirt. What is a medium size in the United States and Europe is large size for Asia.

As with any statistical data, the accuracy of the findings may be challenged. In this case, for the following reasons:

- Some studies may allow subjects to self-report values. Generally speaking, self-reported height tends to be taller than measured height, although the overestimation of height depends on the reporting subject's height, age, gender and region.
- Test subjects may have been invited instead of random sampling, resulting in sampling bias.
- Some countries may have significant height gaps between different regions. For instance, one survey shows there is 10.8 centimetres (4.3 in) difference in mean height between the tallest state and the shortest state in Germany. Under such circumstances, the mean height may not represent the total population unless sample subjects are appropriately taken from all regions with using weighted average of the different regional groups.
- Different social groups can show different mean height. According to a study in France, executives and professionals are 2.6 centimetres (1.0 in) taller, and university students are 2.55 centimetres (1.0 in) taller than the national average. As this case shows, data taken from a particular social group may not represent a total population in some countries.
- Height measurement can vary over the course of a day, due to factors such as a decrease from exercise done directly before measurement (i.e. inversely correlated), or an increase after lying down for a significant period of time (i.e. positively correlated). For example, one study revealed a mean decrease of 1.54 centimetres (0.6 in) in the heights of 100 children from getting out of bed in the morning to between 4 and 5 p.m. that same day.

A 2005 study found that male teenagers from the Dinaric Alps are the tallest people in Europe.

== Measurement ==
Height measurements are by nature subject to statistical sampling errors even for a single individual. In a clinical situation, height measurements are seldom taken more often than once per office visit, which may mean sampling taking place a week to several months apart. The smooth 50th percentile male and female growth curves illustrated above are aggregate values from thousands of individuals sampled at ages from birth to age 20. In reality, a single individual's growth curve shows large upward and downward spikes, partly due to actual differences in growth velocity, and partly due to small measurement errors.

For example, a typical measurement error of plus or minus 0.5 cm (0.2 in) may completely nullify 0.5 cm of actual growth resulting in either a "negative" 0.5 cm growth (due to overestimation in the previous visit combined with underestimation in the latter), up to a 1.5 cm (0.6 in) growth (the first visit underestimating and the second visit overestimating) in the same elapsed period between measurements. Note there is a discontinuity in the growth curves at age 2, which reflects the difference in recumbent length (with the child on his or her back), used in measuring infants and toddlers, and standing height typically measured from age 2 onwards.

Crown-rump length is the measurement of the length of human embryos and fetuses from the top of the head (crown) to the bottom of the buttocks (rump). It is typically determined from ultrasound imagery and can be used to estimate gestational age.

Until two years old, recumbent length is used to measure infants. Length measures the same dimension as height, but height is measured standing up while the length is measured lying down. In developed nations, the average total body length of a newborn is about 50 cm (20 in), although premature newborns may be much smaller.

Standing height is used to measure children over two years old and adults who can stand without assistance. Measure is done with a stadiometer. In general, standing height is about 0.7 cm (0.3 in) less than recumbent length.

Surrogate height measurements are used when standing height and recumbent length are impractical. For example, the Chumlea equation, which uses knee height, can be used to estimate the height of hospitalized patients when standard methods are impractical. Some other techniques include arm span, sitting height, and ulna length.

== See also ==
- Acceleration (human development)
- Anthropometry, the measurement of the human individual
- Human body weight
- Economics and Human Biology
- History of anthropometry
- Human physical appearance
- List of tallest people
- Pygmy peoples
- Overgrowth syndrome

== General and cited bibliography ==
- "Los españoles somos 3,5 cm más altos que hace 20 años" [Spaniards are 3.5 cm taller than 20 years ago]. 20 minutos (in Spanish). 31 July 2006.
- Aminorroaya, A.; Amini, M.; Naghdi, H. & Zadeh, A. H. (2003). "Growth charts of heights and weights of male children and adolescents of Isfahan, Iran" (PDF). Journal of Health, Population, and Nutrition. 21 (4): 341–346. PMID 15038589. S2CID 21907084. Archived from the original (PDF) on 19 September 2018.
- Bilger, Burkhard (29 March 2004). "The Height Gap". The New Yorker. Archived from the original on 2 April 2004.
- Bogin, Barry (2001). The Growth of Humanity. Hoboken, NJ: Wiley-Liss. ISBN 978-0-471-35448-2.
- Case, A. & Paxson, C. (2008). "Stature and Status: Height, ability, and labor market outcomes". The Journal of Political Economy. 116 (3): 499–532. Bibcode:2008JPoEc.116..499C. doi:10.1086/589524. PMC 2709415. PMID 19603086.
- "Health Survey for England – trend data". United Kingdom: Department of Health and Social Care. Archived from the original on 10 October 2004.
- Eurostat Statistical Yearbook 2004. Luxembourg: Eurostat. 2014. ISBN 978-92-79-38906-1. (for heights in Germany)
- Eveleth, P. B.; Tanner, J. M. (1990). Worldwide Variation in Human Growth (2nd ed.). Cambridge University Press. ISBN 978-0-521-35916-0.
- Grandjean, Etienne (1987). Fitting the Task to the Man: An Ergonomic Approach. London: Taylor & Francis. ISBN 978-0-85066-192-7. (for heights in U.S. and Japan)
- Habicht, Michael E.; Henneberg, Maciej; Öhrström, Lena M.; Staub, Kaspar & Rühli, Frank J. (27 April 2015). "Body height of mummified pharaohs supports historical suggestions of sibling marriages". American Journal of Physical Anthropology. 157 (3): 519–525. Bibcode:2015AJPA..157..519H. doi:10.1002/ajpa.22728. PMID 25916977. S2CID 205335354.
- A collection of data on human height, referred to here as "karube" but originally collected from other sources, is archived here. A copy is available here (an English translation of this Japanese page would make it easier to evaluate the quality of the data...)
- Krishan, K. & Sharma, J. C. (2002). "Intra-individual difference between recumbent length and stature among growing children". Indian Journal of Pediatrics. 69 (7): 565–569. doi:10.1007/BF02722678. PMID 12173694. S2CID 22427304.
- Miura, K.; Nakagawa, H. & Greenland, P. (2002). "Invited commentary: Height-cardiovascular disease relation: where to go from here?". American Journal of Epidemiology. 155 (8): 688–689. doi:10.1093/aje/155.8.688. PMID 11943684.
- "Americans Slightly Taller, Much Heavier Than Four Decades Ago". National Center for Health Statistics. 27 October 2004.
- Netherlands Central Bureau for Statistics, 1996 (for average heights)
- Ogden, Cynthia L.; Fryar, Cheryl D.; Carroll, Margaret D. & Flegal, Katherine M. (27 October 2004). "Mean Body Weight, Height, and Body Mass Index, United States 1960–2002" (PDF). Advance Data from Vital and Health Statistics (347): 1–17. PMID 15544194.
- Ruff, Christopher (October 2002). "Variation in human body size and shape". Annual Review of Anthropology. 31 (1): 211–232. Bibcode:2002ARAnt..31..211R. doi:10.1146/annurev.anthro.31.040402.085407.
- Sakamaki, R.; Amamoto, R.; Mochida, Y.; Shinfuku, N. & Toyama, K. (2005). "A comparative study of food habits and body shape perception of university students in Japan and Korea". Nutrition Journal. 4 31. doi:10.1186/1475-2891-4-31. PMC 1298329. PMID 16255785.
- 6. Celostátní antropologický výzkum dětí a mládeže 2001, Česká republika [6th Nationwide anthropological research of children and youth 2001, Czech Republic] (in Czech). Prague: Státní zdravotní ústav (SZÚ; "State Health Institute"). 2005. ISBN 978-8-07071-251-1.
