= Siddiqa Parveen =

Former tallest living woman (1988–2024)

- Born: 1987 or 1988; West Bengal, India
- Died: 14 August 2024 (aged 36); Gangarampur, West Bengal
- Other names: Siddiqa Parvin
- Known for: Tallest living female, tallest Indian woman
- Height: 7 ft 8 in (234 cm)

Siddiqa Parveen (1987 or 1988 – 14 August 2024) was an Indian woman listed by Guinness World Records as the tallest living woman. She was also the tallest Indian woman in recorded history at 7 ft 8 in (2.34 m).

== Biography ==
Siddiqa Parveen first became known in 2012 when India TV News reported her to be 8 ft 0 in (2.44 m) and 160 kilograms (350 lb).

In December 2012, she was measured lying down by Dr. Debasis Saha and found to be at least 7 ft 3.5 in (2.223 m), but her fully upright height was estimated to be at least 7 ft 8 in (2.34 m).

In early August 2024, her health suddenly started to deteriorate and she was admitted to Gangarampur Super Speciality Hospital. She died on 14 August 2024, aged 36.

== See also ==
- Dharmendra Pratap Singh - Tallest living man in India
- Vikas Uppal - Tallest ever Indian
- Sultan Kösen - Tallest living man
- Robert Wadlow - Tallest man ever
- Trijntje Keever - Tallest woman ever
- Zeng Jinlian - Tallest woman ever officially confirmed by Guinness World Records
