= Wadlow =

Wadlow is an English surname. Notable people with the surname include:

- Chris Wadlow, British solicitor and law professor
- Jeff Wadlow (born 1976), American screenwriter, producer and director
- Mark Wadlow (born 1962), English screenwriter
- Robert Wadlow (1918–1940), tallest person ever, US
- Stan Wadlow (1903–1989), Canadian politician and soccer player
- Tim Wadlow (born 1974), American sailor

== See also ==
- Robert Wadlow Museum in Alton, Illinois
