= Bao Xishun =

World's tallest man from 2005 to 2009

- 鮑喜順
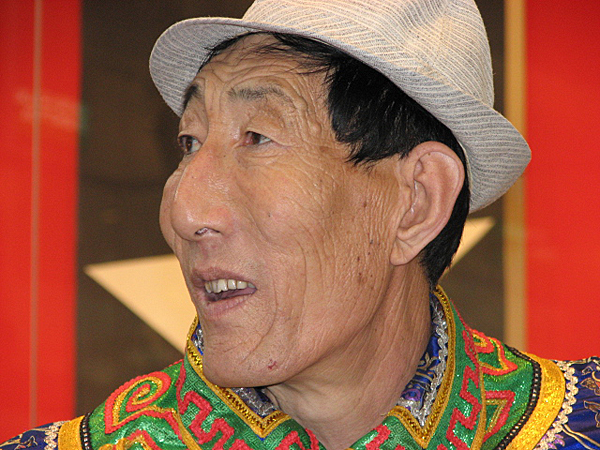
- Born: 2 November 1951 (age 75); Chifeng, Inner Mongolia, China
- Years active: 2004–present
- Known for: Former World's Tallest Man
- Height: 236 cm (7 ft 9 in)
- Spouse: Xia Shujuan
- Children: 1

Bao Xishun
- Simplified Chinese: 鲍喜顺
- Traditional Chinese: 鮑喜順
Transcriptions
Standard Mandarin
- Hanyu Pinyin: Bào Xǐshùn

Bao Xishun (sometimes rendered Bao Xi Shun; born 2 November 1951) is a Chinese herdsman from Chifeng, Inner Mongolia, recognized by Guinness World Records as one of the world's tallest living men at 236 cm (7 ft 9 in) tall. He was formerly certified as the tallest living man by the Guinness World Records. On 17 September 2009, Sultan Kösen overtook Bao Xishun as the tallest living man.

== Early life ==
Bao was born in a village on the edge of the Horqin grassland, part of Ongniud Banner under the administration of Chifeng. He is the second of five children, with two sisters and two brothers. Bao is ethnically Mongol. His parents were of average height, with his mother standing at 160 cm (5 ft 3 in) and his father at 180 cm (5 ft 11 in). The First Affiliated Hospital of Inner Mongolia Medical University attested that Bao did not have gigantism and that his pituitary gland showed no abnormalities. Bao experienced calcium deficiency and nutritional imbalances as a child, also developing rheumatism due to frequently sleeping outside without adequate clothing. He completed six years of primary school, after which Bao became a full-time farmer and herder, also working as a construction worker to earn work points within his commune. Bao can speak both Chinese and Mongolian, but is only literate in the latter.

Bao claims to have been of normal height until he was fifteen or sixteen years old, when he grew to 189 cm (6 ft 2 1/2 in). Bao took notice of his unusually tall height at age seventeen or eighteen. By the time he was 20, Bao stood 210 cm (6 ft 10 1/2 in). At his final height, Bao weighed in at 165 kilograms (364 lb), with his legs measuring 150 centimetres (4.9 ft) and his feet 38 centimetres (15 in) in length.

Bao's height caused him to have difficulty sleeping on the kang bed-stove, requiring a stool as a makeshift extension. In addition, his blanket, even when stitched together with leftover fabric, could only cover Bao's upper body, leaving his legs exposed to the cold and worsening his rheumatism. Bao also required double the amount of food, usually cornmeal porridge, to feel full at every meal, deciding early on to eat less to not overburden the family. His stature was advantageous during construction work, as he did not need a ladder when making mud roofs and had an easier time shovelling. Bao's overall physical constitution was relatively weak, however, and he is unable to stand for long periods of times without the use of a walking stick. Residents of Bao's village initially called him a "monster" for his height, but eventually came to regard him as a local curiosity, becoming recognized as "Chifeng's tallest herdsman" by The Best of Chifeng magazine.

== Career ==
In spring of 1970, Bao's father took him to Shenyang for rheumatism treatment, he met Leng Wanju, a basketball coach working for the People's Liberation Army, who, impressed with Bao's height, convinced Bao to join the military. He served in the People's Liberation Army for three years, during which time he also played for the Shenyang Military Region Basketball Team. Bao was provided custom-tailored clothes and underwent strength training in hopes of becoming a better athlete, but due to his rheumatism, his agility did not improve.

Following his discharge, Bao returned to Inner Mongolia to live with his parents and work on the farm, having become his clan's patriarch. Bao made no attempt to enter a romantic relationship upon his return, prioritising his parents' well-being and believing that his height would frighten away any women he was interested in. At age 40, Bao's leg pains worsened to the point that he could no longer perform physical labour. His family supported him for the next decade, with Bao contemplating leaving home without their knowledge to ease the financial burden and earn a living by posing for photos. His mother continued to make fitting clothes and shoes for her son. She still sewed his clothes after falling in the 1980s, right up until her death on 19 December 1991. Bao subsequently became a recluse, remaining home to tend to the family's sheep after his siblings moved away after marrying.

In September 2004, Xin Xing, a local restaurant owner, offered Bao a position as a greeter. Bao, having had uncomfortable experiences with curious onlookers during his visit to Shenyang, was reluctant to go to a larger city again and did not want to be treated as a living curiosity. Xin ultimately convinced Bao by revealing that he would pay ¥1,000 (the average annual earnings of a herdsman at the time was between ¥600 and ¥700) for Bao's services. Bao, dressed in his traditional Mongolian deel, handed out flyers to guests and passersby for ten days, greatly increasing the restaurant's customership and gaining attention by the press. Because some people were concerned with Bao's reliance on crutches, Xin arranged for a medical examination, which could not find a particular cause for his growth, but otherwise showed that he was in good health for his age. Bao also began participating in public welfare initiatives and appearing at commercial events. Bao, who was previously shy, gradually became more outgoing, once singing a Mongolian folk song on television.

In late 2004, a Chifeng newspaper contacted Guinness World Records to have Bao nominated as the world's tallest man against the incumbent holder, Radhouane Charbib. On 21 July 2005, Bao officially took the record, having been measured as 0.25 centimetres (0.098 in) taller than Charbib.

In December 2006, Bao was asked by veterinarians to assist them in removing shards of plastic from the stomachs of two dolphins. The dolphins had accidentally swallowed the shards, which had settled in their stomachs and caused a loss of appetite and depression. Veterinarians had been unable to remove them, so Xishun Bao used his 1.06-metre-long arms to reach into the dolphins' stomachs and remove the plastic manually. In 2007, Bao met He Pingping, the shortest mobile man, at a Guinness World Record holder meeting at Hotel Chelsea in New York City.

== Personal life ==
Bao married saleswoman Xia Shujuan on 24 March 2007. The Mongolian ceremony took place on 12 July 2007. Bao's son was born at a hospital in Zunhua, Hebei province on 2 October 2008. Bao appeared on the eleventh episode of The Amazing Race 16 as the "Pit Stop" greeter, which aired on 2 May 2010.

As of early 2024, Bao has remained largely at home, while his wife works at a community centre. Their son, Bao Tianyou, then aged 15, was in his last year of junior middle school and stood at "nearly two metres".

== See also ==
- List of tallest people
- Robert Wadlow, tallest man in history
- Öndör Gongor, a very tall man in early-20th century Mongolia
- Leonid Stadnyk
- Sultan Kösen, current tallest man according to Guinness Book of Records
- Clifford Ray, another person (former basketball player) to reach inside of a dolphin's stomach to save its life.
- Yao Defen
- Chandra Bahadur Dangi, shortest person in history
- Zeng Jinlian, tallest woman in history

Preceded by Radhouane Charbib	Tallest Recognized Person; January 15, 2005 – August 7, 2007	Succeeded by Leonid Stadnyk
Preceded by Leonid Stadnyk	Tallest Recognized Person; August 20, 2008 – September 17, 2009	Succeeded by Sultan Kösen
