= Leonid Stadnyk =

Ukrainian farmer who claimed to have stood at 2.57 m

- Леонід Стадник
- Born: Leonid Stepanovych Stadnyk; 5 August 1970; Zhytomyr Oblast, Ukrainian SSR, USSR
- Died: 24 August 2014 (aged 44); Podoliantsi, Chudniv Raion, Zhytomyr Oblast, Ukraine
- Height: 8 ft 5.5 in (2.578 m) (disputed); 7 ft 7 in (2.31 m) (according to photographic evidence)

Leonid Stepanovych Stadnyk (Ukrainian: Леонід Степанович Стадник; 5 August 1970 – 24 August 2014) was a Ukrainian man who claimed to have stood at 2.57 m (8 ft 5 in) though photographic evidence suggests he was not taller than 7 ft 7 in (2.31 m).

== Death ==
Stadnyk died at the age of 44 on 24 August 2014 from a brain hemorrhage.

== See also ==
- List of tallest people
- Bao Xishun, the previous holder of tallest man Guinness title
- Robert Wadlow (1918–1940), the tallest man in history
- Sultan Kösen, the current tallest man in Guinness title

Preceded by Bao Xishun	Tallest Recognized Person; 7 August 2007 – 20 August 2008	Succeeded by Bao Xishun
