= Dharmendra Pratap Singh =

Tallest living man in India

- Born: 1983 (age 42–43)
- Known for: Tallest living Indian
- Height: 2.46 m (8 ft 1 in)
- Political party: Samajwadi Party

Dharmendra Pratap Singh (born 1982) is an Indian who is among the tallest living people at 2.471 m (8 ft 1.3 in). He currently lives in Lucknow, Uttar Pradesh, India. He is currently listed as the tallest man in India by The Limca Book of Records. He became the tallest living Indian in 2007, after the death of Vikas Uppal, who was 2.51 m (8 ft 3 in).

== See also ==
- Robert Wadlow, tallest man ever
- Sultan Kösen, tallest living human
- Vikas Uppal, tallest Indian ever
- Siddiqa Parveen, tallest Indian woman
