= Vikas Uppal =

Tallest Indian ever

Vikas Kumar Uppal
- Born: 1 January 1986; Rohtak, Haryana, India
- Died: 30 June 2007 (aged 21); Delhi, India
- Other name: Vicky
- Known for: Tallest Indian
- Height: 8 ft 2 in (249 cm)

Vikas Kumar "Vicky" Uppal (1 January 1986 – 30 June 2007) was a native and resident of India, said to be India's tallest man until his death on 30 June 2007 when he died during a brain tumor operation in Delhi. In 2004, The Tribune reported him to be 2.51 m (8 ft 3 in) tall and still growing, being in his late teens.

Vicky Uppal was from the Rohtak district in the Indian state of Haryana. He was photographed for The Hindu in September 2006 at a rally held by the Indian National Lok Dal. He was purported by some to be 2.67 m (8 ft 9 in) tall, but other sources claimed he was 2.46 m (8 ft 1 in) tall. He could have been considered the world's tallest living man, but the Guinness Book of Records has strict verification criteria; hence, Guinness did not measure Uppal. He also had been said to have hands 33 cm (13 in) long and, feet 48 cm (19 in) long, and appears in photographs to be proportionate, not obviously a pathological (acromegalic, for example) giant. He also acted in a Bollywood movie, Rang De Basanti.

== See also ==
- List of tallest people
- Dharmendra Pratap Singh - tallest living Indian
- Robert Wadlow, tallest man ever
- Sultan Kösen, tallest living human
- Siddiqa Parveen, tallest Indian woman
