= Väinö Myllyrinne =

Finnish giant

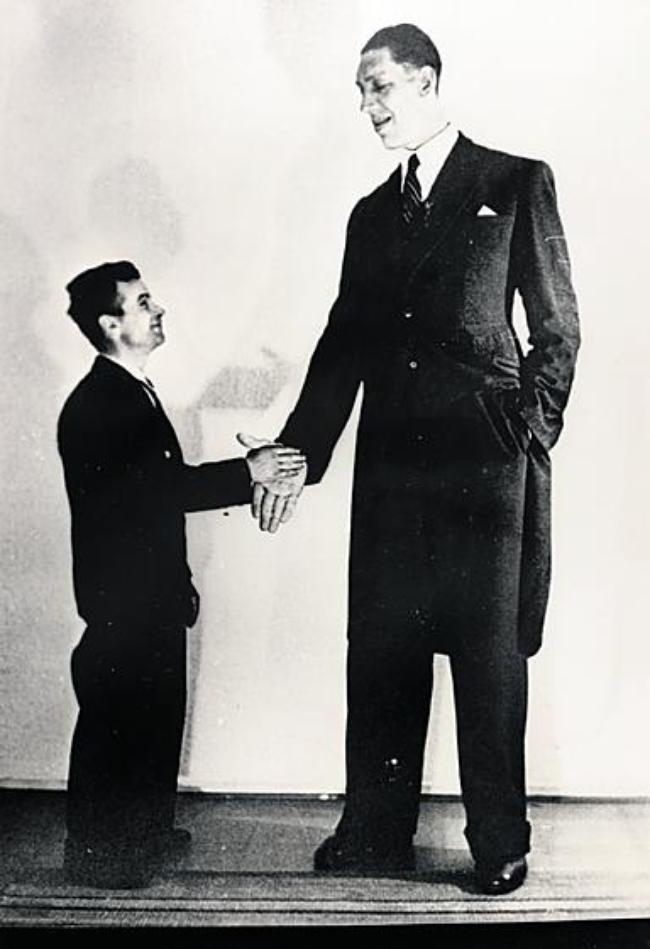
- Myllyrinne shaking hands with a man of average stature
- Born: 27 February 1909; Helsinki, Grand Duchy of Finland
- Died: 13 April 1963 (aged 54); Helsinki, Finland
- Known for: Fifth tallest undisputed man ever
- Height: 248 cm (8 ft 2 in)

Väinö Myllyrinne (27 February 1909 – 13 April 1963) was a Finnish acromegalic giant who was at one time (1940–1963) the world's tallest living person, and may have become the tallest after the death of Robert Wadlow. He stood 224 cm (7 ft 4 in) and weighed 141 kg (22 stone; 311 pounds) at the age of 21, but experienced a second phase of growth in his late thirties, attaining a height of 248 cm (8 ft 2 in).

Myllyrinne was born in Helsinki, Grand Duchy of Finland, and is considered the tallest soldier ever, having served in the Finnish Defence Forces. He underwent his conscript training in 1929 in the Viipuri Heavy Artillery Regiment, and was 220 cm (7 ft 3 in) tall and very strong. In the 1930s he travelled around Europe as a professional wrestler and circus performer. He returned to Finland in 1939 to serve in the Finnish Army during the Winter War. In 1946, he moved to Järvenpää and ran a chicken farm. He died in Helsinki in 1963 and is buried at Järvenpää.

In 1962, just a year before his death, he was measured by doctors at 2.48 m (8 ft 1.5 in). A newspaper report from 1947 stated that his height was 2.77 m (9 ft 1 in).

Preceded by Robert Wadlow	Tallest Recognized Person; 1940–1963	Unknown Title next held by Don Koehler
