= Bunford =

Bunford is a surname. Notable people with the surname include:

- Huw Bunford (born 1967), Welsh musician
- Jane Bunford (1895–1922), English tall woman
