= Bernard Coyne =

Bernard Coyne may refer to:

- Bernard Coyne (giant) (1897–1921), tallest person in the world at the time of his death
- Bernard Coyne (bishop) (1854–1926), Irish Roman Catholic bishop
