= Yao Defen =

Former tallest living woman (1972-2012)

Yao Defen (姚德芬)
- Born: July 15, 1972; Shucheng, Lu'an, Anhui, China
- Died: November 13, 2012 (aged 40); Shucheng, Liuan, Anhui, China
- Known for: Former tallest living woman World record holder
- Height: 7 ft 7.85 in (233.30 cm)

Yao Defen (Chinese: 姚德芬; pinyin: Yáo Défēn; July 15, 1972 – November 13, 2012) was a Chinese woman who was the tallest living woman, as recognized by Guinness World Records. She stood at 7 ft 8 in tall and weighed 346 lb (157kg). Her gigantism was due to a tumor in her pituitary gland.

== Early life ==
Yao Defen was born to poor farmers in the town of Liuan in the Anhui province of Shucheng County. At birth she weighed 2.8 kilograms (6.2 lb). When she was eleven years old, she was about 188 centimetres (6 ft 2 in) tall. She was 210 centimetres (6 ft 11 in) tall by the age of fifteen.

The story of this "giant woman" began to spread rapidly after she went to see a doctor at the age of fifteen for an illness. Medical doctors (who also saw her after years) properly diagnosed the illness but decided not to cure her, because her family did not have the 4000 yuan for the surgery. After that, many companies attempted to train her to be a sports star. The plans were abandoned, however, because Yao was too weak. Because she was illiterate, since 1992 Defen earned a living by traveling with her father and performing.

Yao's giant stature was caused by a condition called gigantism, wherein a large tumor in the pituitary gland of the brain releases too much growth hormone and causes excessive growth (Gigantism differs from acromegaly because growth hormone takes effect before growth plates are closed; in acromegaly, growth hormone takes effect after growth plates have closed). Around 2002 a hospital in Guangdong removed the tumor. In 2009, the TLC cable TV network devoted a whole night's show to her. She fell in her home and had internal bleeding of the brain. She recovered and received a visit from China's tallest man, Zhang Juncai.

== Death ==
Yao died on November 13, 2012, at the age of 40 from an unspecified ailment.

Preceded by Sandy Allen	Tallest Recognized Woman; 2008–2012	Succeeded by Sun Fang (2.21 m)

== See also ==
- List of tallest people
- Sultan Kösen, tallest living man
- Zeng Jinlian, the tallest woman in medical history
