= John Rogan =

Second tallest person in recorded history (1867–1905)

- Rogan c. before 1905
- Born: February 12, 1867; Hendersonville, Tennessee, U.S.
- Died: September 11, 1905 (aged 38); Gallatin, Tennessee, U.S.
- Other names: Willie, Bud Rogan, The Negro Giant
- Occupations: Salesman, artist, sharecropper
- Known for: Second tallest verified human in recorded history
- Height: 8 ft 9 in (267 cm)
- Relatives: William Rogan (father)

John William Rogan (February 12, 1867 (Note: Some sources list his birth year as 1871) – September 11, 1905) was an American sharecropper who was the second-tallest person ever at 8 ft 9 in (267 cm), behind Robert Wadlow. However, Rogan's height caused health problems and he was physically immobile and could not stand or walk.

== Biography ==
John Rogan was born in Hendersonville, Tennessee. He was the son of William Rogan, as the fourth of twelve children, his rapid growth began at the age of 13, due to gigantism of uncertain origin. This led to ankylosis, an abnormal rigidity of the skeletal joints. By the age of 15, he was unable to stand or walk.

As he was unable to perform physical labor due to his condition, Rogan made a living by selling portraits and postcards at a train station. An 1897 article in the Kansas City Journal mentions how a number of his drawings were published. He declined all offers to join carnivals and sideshows. He used a goat-pulled cart like a wheelchair and was a center of attention, often noted for his deep voice and playful attitude.

Rogan died on September 11, 1905, due to complications related to his condition. Evidence points to his burial having been on old Rogan farmland.

== Height and weight ==
In 1899, Rogan was measured at 8 ft 6 in (2.59 m). He is the second tallest person on record and was recorded as the tallest person ever at the time, a title also claimed by Franz Winkelmeier. Robert Wadlow's height surpassed Rogan's in 1939.

Rogan weighed between 175 lb (79 kg) and 205 lb (93 kg), often billed in newspapers as the "negro giant" and "living skeleton". Rogan's hands measured 11 in (28 cm) in length and his feet measured 13 in (33 cm) in length. Around the time of his death he measured 8 ft 9 in (2.67 m).

A newspaper article reported that his maternal grandfather was also a giant, requiring a larger saddle when he rode horses, hinting at a possible genetic inheritance.

== Gallery ==
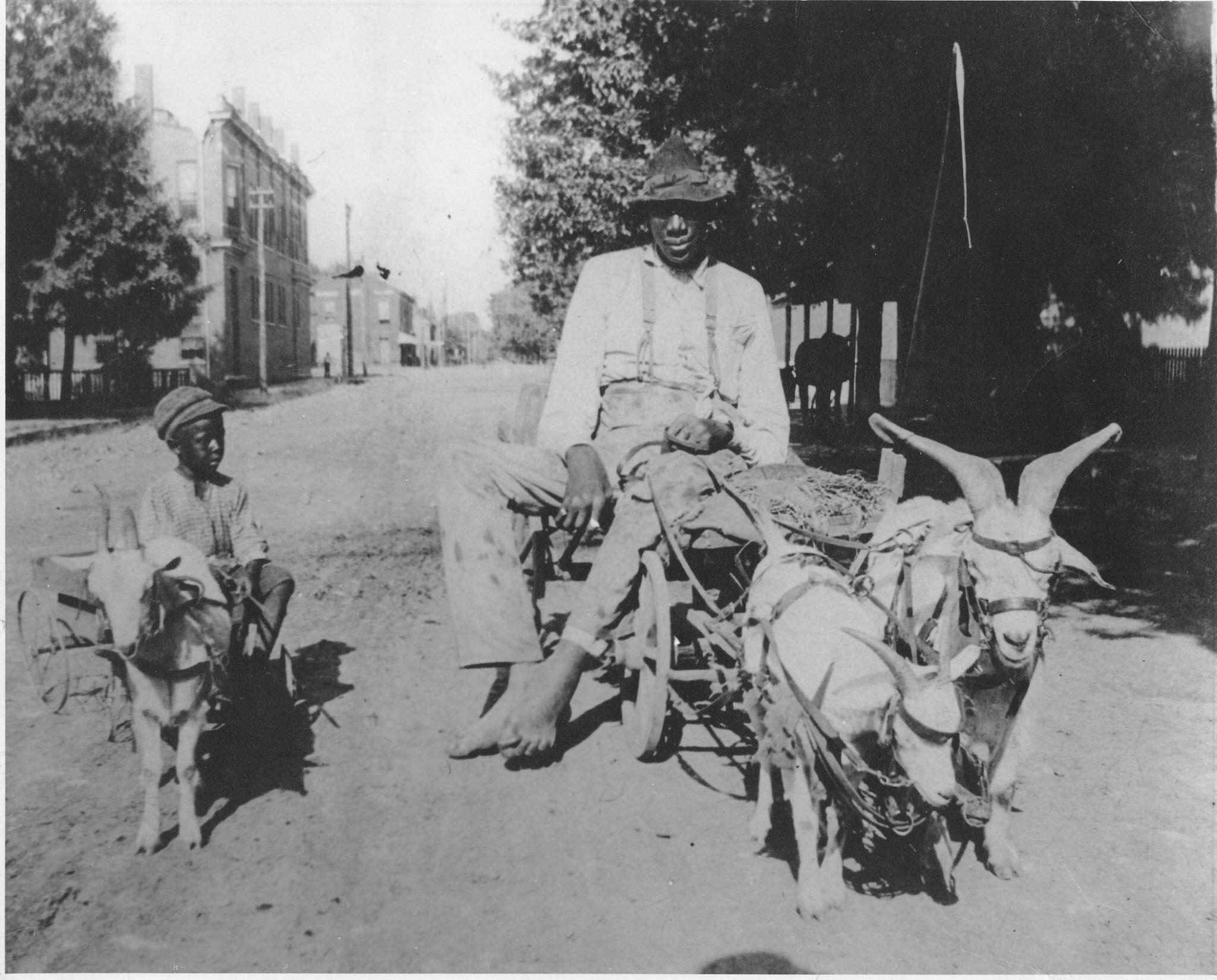
Rogan on his cart driven by his goats, in Gallatin, Tennessee.

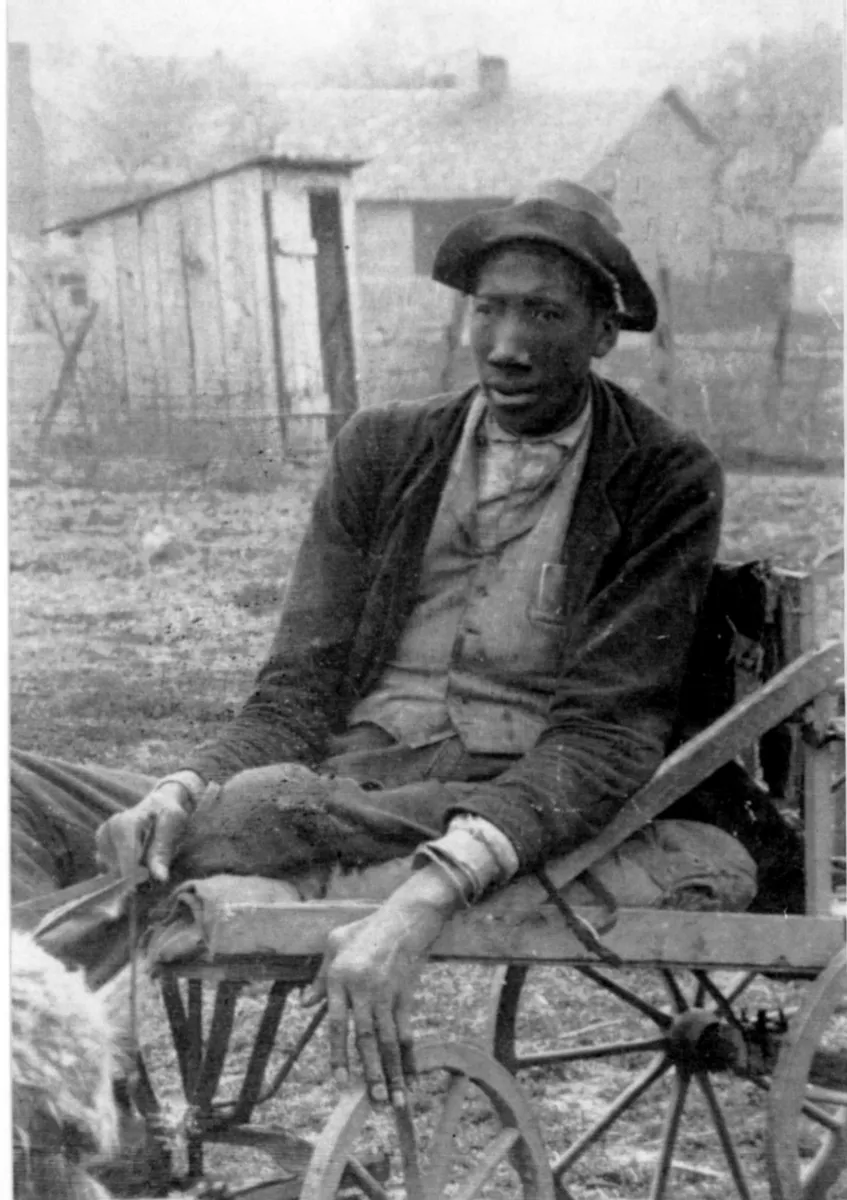
Rogan sitting in his cart

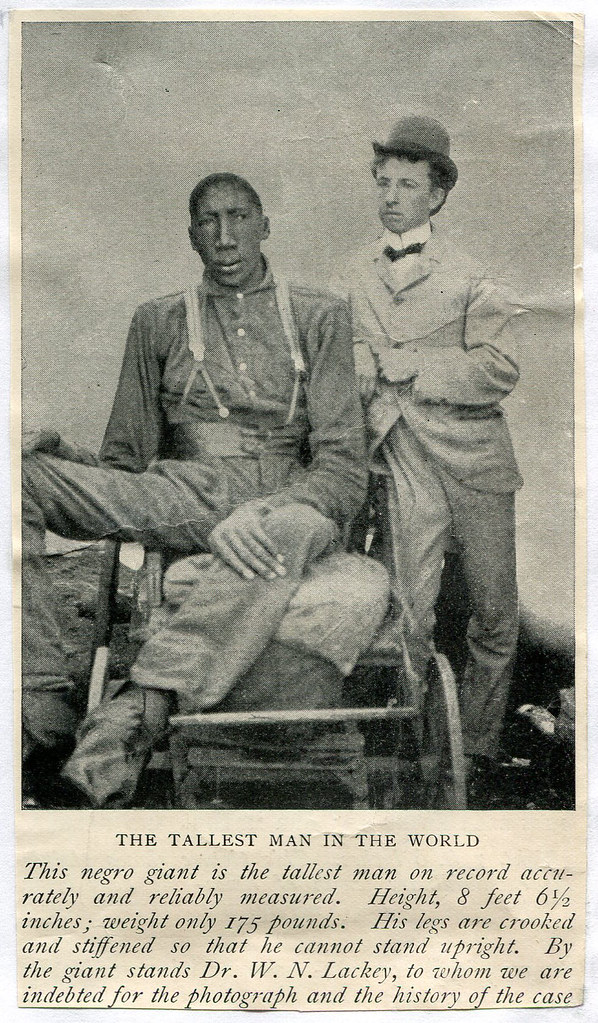
Rogan (left) and Dr. W.N. Lackey

== See also ==
- List of tallest people

== Notes ==
| Preceded by Franz Winkelmeier | Tallest recognized person 1898?–1905 | Succeeded by Bernard Coyne |
| Preceded by Franz Winkelmeier | Tallest recognized person ever 1899–1938 | Succeeded by Robert Wadlow |
