= Yilishen Tianxi Group =

Fraudulent Chinese medicine company

- Company type: Privately held company
- Industry: Health care, pyramid scheme
- Genre: defunct
- Founded: Liaoyang, Liaoning, People's Republic of China (1999)
- Founder: Wang Fengyou
- Headquarters: Liaoyang, People's Republic of China
- Area served: defunct
- Products: Traditional Chinese medicine
- Revenue: 15 billion yuan
- Website: http://www.tianxigroup.com/

The Yilishen Tianxi Group (Chinese: 蚁力神天玺集团; pinyin: Yǐ Lì Shén Tiān Xǐ Jí Tuán) was a Chinese company established in 1999 which sold traditional Chinese medicine products made from ants. More than one million people invested money in the company, purchasing and raising boxes of ants with the promise that they could sell the ants back for a profit, before it was exposed as a ponzi scheme in 2007.

== History ==
In 1999, Wang Fengyou, a Liaoning businessman, set up the Yilishen Tianxi Group to make health products whose main ingredients were ants, including a version of Viagra. In addition to advertising the products under the name Yilishen on television (endorsed by Bao Xishun, China's tallest man, and Zhao Benshan, China's most prominent comedian celebrity), investors were offered a significant return if they bought boxes of black mountain ants from the company and raised them to maturity. Buyers, most of whom were unemployed factory workers or peasants, were instructed to feed the ants sugar water, egg yolk and cake, with the promise that after three months, they could sell them back to the company. Returns on investment were reported to be anywhere between 30 and 60 percent, and many investors used the profits to buy more ants. Yilishen Tianxi built a factory to produce pills and wine made from the dead ants; Yilishen products were sold in more than 50,000 Chinese pharmacies, and the company's annual revenue was 15 billion yuan.

The company was endorsed by Chinese government officials, and Wang, now the chief executive, was photographed with the former Minister of Commerce of the People's Republic of China, Bo Xilai. In 2007, the company received a direct marketing license, seen by many as a government endorsement; Wang was also listed as one of "China's Top 10 Entrepreneurial Leaders".

In May 2007, the business began to fail; sales of the health products had decreased and Yilishen Tianxi was using investors' money as income. In addition, Wang had made donations totalling $1.4 million to charity and to the 2008 Summer Olympics, to pay for infrastructure such as a subway system in Liaoyang which had boosted the company's public image. It was also alleged that the company had spent a large amount of money bribing corrupt government officials in return for favourable treatment. In November, Yilishen Tianxi was unable to pay profits to its investors, and more than 10,000 protesting investors were met by riot police in the provincial capital Shenyang.

On 7 December 2007, Wang Fengyou was arrested by the public security bureau in Liaoning for disruption of public order after thousands of ant farmers staged public protests outside government buildings which it was alleged he instigated. His arrest and confession was shown on local television, and he admitted that he had been responsible for the protests. The company has since gone into liquidation.

Many of the investors have lost their family's life savings or their retirement pensions; several have committed suicide. One man set fire to himself in Tiananmen Square. Many of the ant farmers believe they are being monitored by the government, particularly after suggestions that they may disrupt the 2008 Summer Olympics in Beijing. Lindsey Hilsum, a British correspondent for Channel 4 News, reported investors were too frightened to show their faces on camera; several were briefly arrested after she interviewed them, and others had been beaten by police for protesting. Investors had been told to register with the local government, but there are reports that compensation will not be paid.

In February 2008, another man was sentenced to death in the same province of China after defrauding investors of three billion yuan (US$417 million) in a similar ant-breeding scheme.
