= Don Koehler =

American 'giant'

Don A. Koehler
- Born: September 1, 1925; Denton, Montana, U.S.
- Died: February 26, 1981 (aged 55); Chicago, Illinois, U.S.
- Height: 8 ft 2 in (249 cm)

Don A. Koehler (September 1, 1925 – February 26, 1981) is one of 29 known people in medical history to have verifiably reached a height of 8 feet (240 cm) or more. He was generally recognized as the tallest living man in the world from at least 1969 until his death in 1981. At one time, Koehler stood 8 ft 2 in (249 cm), a result of the medical condition gigantism.

He was born in Denton, Montana, United States. Koehler and his twin sister were born to parents of taller than average height. Their mother was 5 ft 10 in (178 cm); their father was 6 ft 2 in (188 cm). He started an abnormal period of growth when he was 10 years old. The Guinness Book of World Records confirmed Koehler at a standing height of 8 ft 2 in (249 cm) at his peak. His twin sister was 5 ft 9 in (175 cm) for a record difference of 2 ft 5 in (74 cm) between the twins.

As a youth, he lived with his family on the north side of Chicago, attending Amundsen High School.

Koehler wore shoes that were size 22, but he once stated that his most bothersome clothing problem was finding socks that fit him. He was later able to find a hosiery company in Pennsylvania that began custom-making socks for him.

== Career ==
For 25 years Koehler worked as a salesman for the Big Joe Manufacturing Company, retiring three years before his death. He considered his size to be an advantage, for potential customers would often want to meet with him out of curiosity, and they always remembered him.

== Later life and death ==
Later in life, he suffered from the medical condition kyphosis, resulting in (often severe) curvature of the spine. Koehler died in 1981 in Chicago from a reported heart condition, by which time he was estimated to be about 7 ft 10 in (239 cm) tall. He was 55 years old.

Per Koehler's wishes, his body was cremated, and his ashes scattered on Long Lake in Wisconsin where he liked to fish.

Unknown Title last held by Väinö Myllyrinne	Tallest Recognized Person c.1969–1981	Unknown Title next held by Zeng Jinlian
