= Jane Bunford =

English female giant

- Born: Jane Bunford; 26 July 1895; Bartley Green, Northfield, Birmingham
- Died: 1 April 1922 (aged 26); Bartley Green, Northfield, Birmingham
- Known for: Tallest recognised British person
- Height: 2.41 m (7 ft 11 in)

Jane Bunford (26 July 1895 – 1 April 1922) was an English woman who was the tallest person ever documented from the United Kingdom measuring 2.41 metres (7 ft 11 in) at the time of her death (adjusted for spinal curvature). She was the tallest woman in the world during her lifetime.

== Early life ==
Bunford's parents were John Bunford (14 March 1856 – 10 December 1916) and Jane Bunford (Nee Andrews) (April 1857 – 1934) of Bartley Green, Birmingham, UK. Her father was a metal caster.

== Accident ==
According to the Guinness Book of Records at the age of 11, Bunford had a head injury. It is believed that the injury permanently damaged her pituitary gland, releasing an excess of growth hormone which sent her growth out of control. While she was fairly tall for her age, her height was not unusual or exceptional before her accident at 5 ft 0 in.

== School ==
Bunford attended St. Michael's Secondary School in Bartley Green. At school she displayed a talent for embroidery but the desks and chairs became too uncomfortable for her to sit at. A Mrs Booth who knew Bunford said it was difficult for her to get through the school doors. As a result of both factors, Bunford's parents took her out of school. On her 13th birthday she was measured at 1.98 metres (6 ft 6 in) tall. On her 21st birthday Bunford was measured at 2.39 metres (7 ft 10 in) tall, her peak standing height. Mrs Booth said Bunford had to have her shoes specially made at Halesowen as she had size 17 feet.

== Later life ==
Bunford rejected several opportunities to benefit financially from her size and appearance. She had straight long auburn hair. In her final years Bunford became a recluse. She hated the attention her size brought her, and her spine developed a severe curvature. Because of this, Bunford could not stand fully erect towards the end of her life. By the end of her life, Bunford was also in pain because of joint problems and other ailments. She often baby-sat young children in the area, as a favour for neighbours.

== Death and funeral ==
Shortly before her death, Bunford was measured at 7 feet 7 inches (2.31 m) tall. It was estimated that she would have been 7 feet 11 inches (2.41 m), if she had not developed the spinal curvature.

Bunford died at her home in Jiggins Lane on 1 April 1922. According to her death certificate, Bunford died of hyperpituitarism and gigantism.

The funeral was held at St Michaels and All Angels Church, Bartley Green, on 5 April 1922. The coffin had been locked in the church overnight before the day of the funeral. According to undertaker's records published in General Practitioner, her coffin was 2.50 metres (8 ft 2 in) long and was probably the longest ever used for a UK funeral. Mrs. Booth claimed in February 1972 that no local people were allowed to enter the church. The story featured on ATV on 27 January 1972 and 14 March 1972.

== See also ==
- List of tallest people
- Zeng Jinlian, the tallest female in medical history

Preceded by Unknown	Tallest Recognized Woman ?-1982	Succeeded by Zeng Jinlian
Preceded by Trijntje Keever Alleged, Disputed	Tallest Recognized Woman ever ?-1982	Succeeded by Zeng Jinlian
Preceded by Unknown	Tallest Recognized British Person ever ?-present	Succeeded by -
