= Stadiometer =

Medical equipment

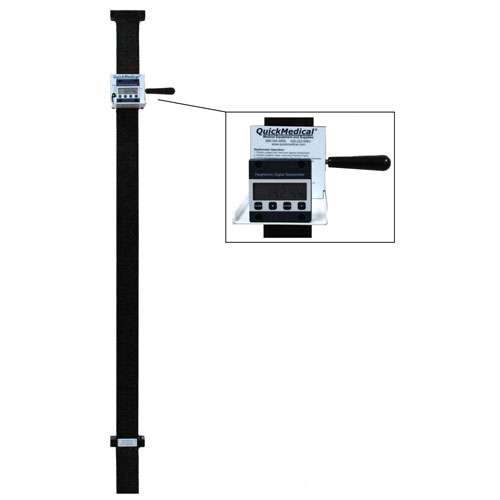
Digital stadiometer with close up insert of the device's headpiece.

A stadiometer is a piece of medical equipment used for measuring human height. It is usually constructed out of a ruler and a sliding horizontal headpiece which is adjusted to rest on the top of the head. Stadiometers are used in routine medical examinations and also clinical tests and experiments.

Devices with similar concept, although with higher resolutions, are used in industrial metrology applications, where they are called height gauges.

== See also ==
- Anthropometry
