= Franz Winkelmeier =

Austrian man who was one of the tallest humans in recorded history

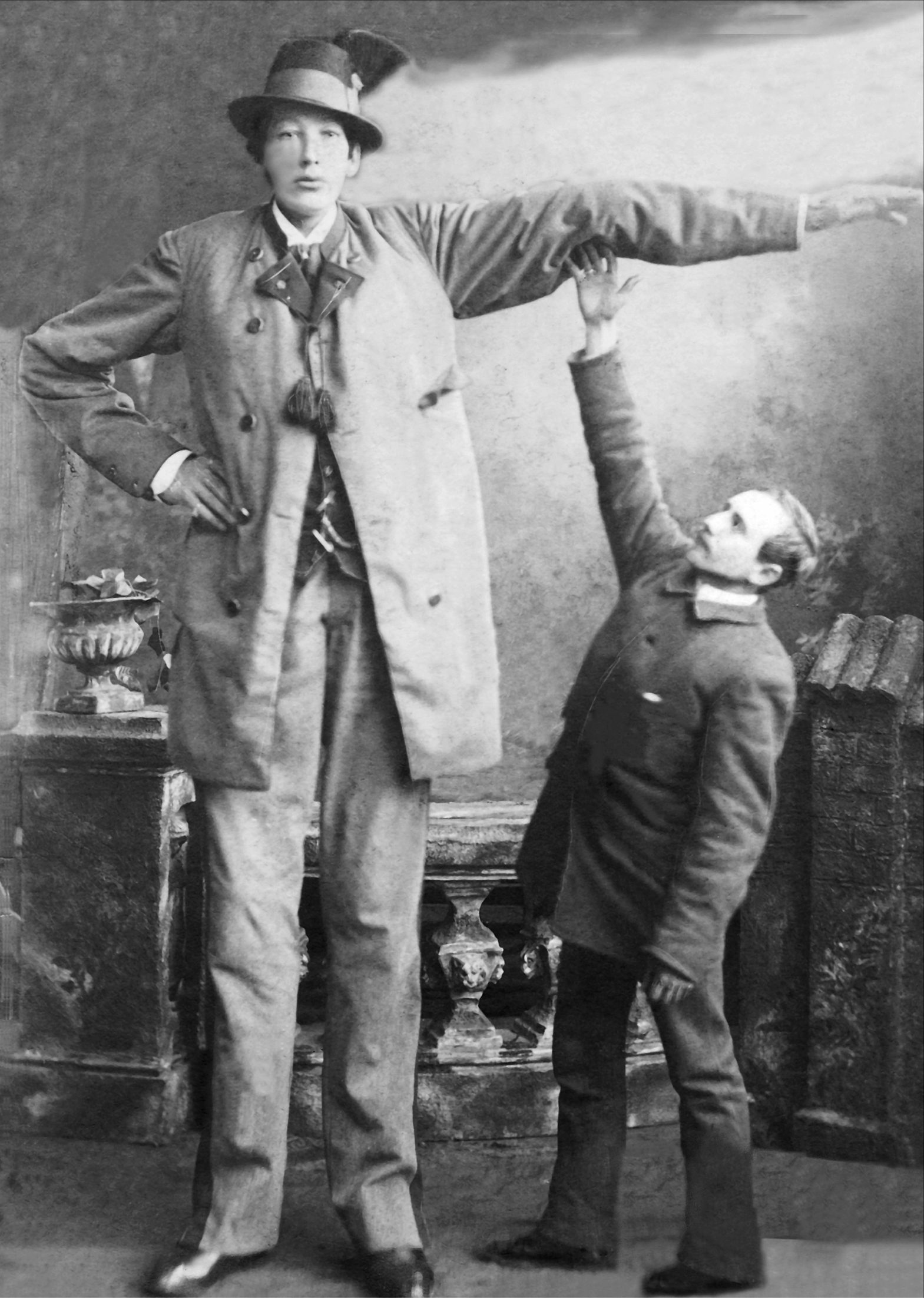
- Born: 27 April 1860; Lengau, Oberösterreich, Austrian Empire
- Died: 23 August 1887 (aged 27); Lengau, Austro-Hungarian Empire
- Other names: The Giant of Friedburg-Lengau, Riese (German for the "Giant")
- Notable work: Guard
- Height: 228 cm (7 ft 6 in)

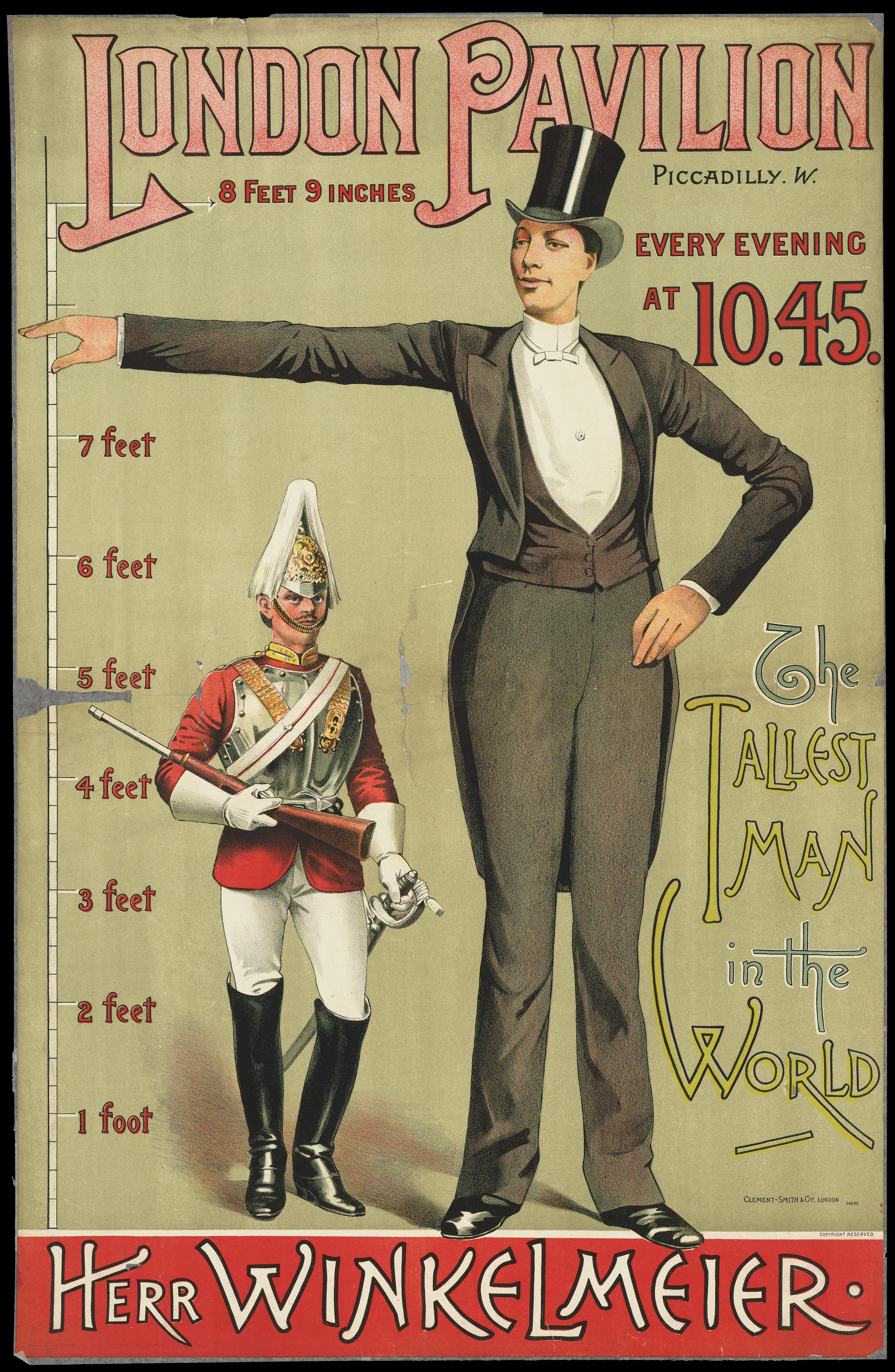
Poster advertising the tallest man in the world: Herr Winkelmeier.

Franz Winkelmeier (27 April 1860 – 24 August 1887) was an Austrian man who was promoted as the world's tallest man at 8 ft 6 in (2.59 m), however he was measured in 1885 at only 7 ft 6 in (2.28 m). He was known as the Giant (German: Riese) of Friedburg-Lengau.

== Biography ==
Franz Winkelmeier was born to a family of smallholding farmers in Lengau, Upper Austria. Two years after his birth, his parents bought the Schöscharngut between Friedburg and Lengau. Winkelmeier attended elementary school in Friedburg. Until the age of fourteen, his growth was normal.

Winkelmeier made his first public appearance as an anomaly on October 6, 1881 in Braunau. He was promoted by an efficient tailor from Friedburg, and appeared in Lower Austria, Steiermark, Carinthia, Görz, Triest, Fiume, Hungaria and Siebenbürgen.

In the summer of 1885, Winkelmeier lived in Tyrol, Austria. He performed at the Concordia-Theater in Berlin, Germany from September 1 until November 30, 1885; even the tall soldiers of Emperor Wilhelm I seemed to be dwarves beside him.

After appearing in more German cities, he moved on to the Folies Bergère theater in Paris, France. On November 9, 1886 he was hired by R. Rosinsky to go to London. There, at the London Pavilion, he performed on the same bill as the juggler Paul Cinquevalli, Katsnoshin Awata also a juggler, and the three acrobat troupes Craggs, Schäffers and Wartenburgs. On June 22, 1887 he was presented to Queen Victoria.

As soon as he finished his tours, Winkelmeier died of tuberculosis. He was buried in the cemetery in Lengau, Austria. There are many mementos of Winkelmeier in the restaurant Zum Riesen (The Giant Restaurant) in Miltenberg, Germany.

== Bibliography ==
- Mairhofer-Irrsee, Hans. Der Riese von Lengau
- Turrini, Peter. Der Riese vom Steinfeld. Oper von Friedrich Cerha
