= Gabriel Monjane =

Mozambique man with gigantism (1944–1990)

- Born: Gabriel Estêvão Monjane; 1944; Manjacaze, Gaza Province, Mozambique
- Died: January 21, 1990 (aged 45–46); Maputo, Mozambique
- Height: 8 ft 0.75 in (245.75 cm)

Gabriel Estêvão Monjane (1944 – January 21, 1990) is one of 29 known people in medical history to have verifiably reached a height of 8 feet (240 cm) or more.

Born in Manjacaze, Gaza Province, Mozambique, Monjane's abnormal growth, attributed to an overactive pituitary gland, started soon after birth. By the time he was 17, Monjane stood 239 cm (7 ft 10 in) He joined a Portuguese circus. When measured officially in 1987, Monjane was 245.7 cm (8 feet 3/4 inch). He also weighed 158 kg (348 pounds).

During his lifetime, especially late into his life, Monjane suffered leg problems. The Guinness Book of World Records stated that he was the tallest living man in their 1988 edition. Monjane died on January 21, 1990 after a fall at his home. Suleiman Ali Nashnush, another African, was named the tallest living man after his death.

== See also ==
- List of tallest people

| Preceded by Unknown: Closest is Zeng Jinlian who had the record six years earlier. | Tallest Recognized Person; 1988–1989 | Succeeded by Suleiman Ali Nashnush |
