= Alibey, Derik =

Village in Mardin Province, Turkey

Alibey
- Neighbourhood
- Location in Turkey
- Coordinates: 37.238°N 40.094°E
- Country: Turkey
- Province: Mardin
- District: Derik
- Population (2021): 657
- Time zone: UTC+3 (TRT)

Alibey (Kurdish: Elîbeg) is a neighbourhood in the municipality and district of Derik, Mardin Province in Turkey. The village had a population of 657 in 2021.

== Notable people ==
- Sultan Kösen
