= Bernard Coyne (giant) =

American giant

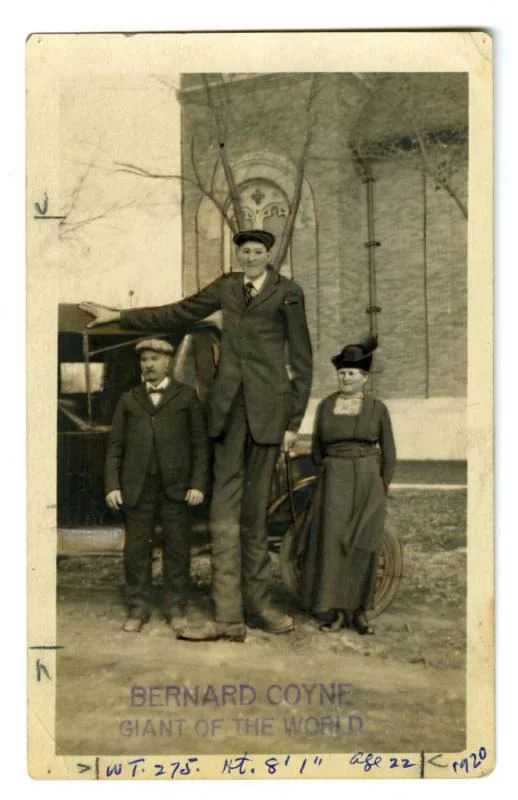
- Born: Bernard A. Coyne; July 27, 1897; Anthon, Iowa, United States
- Died: May 20, 1921 (aged 23)
- Known for: One of the tallest people ever
- Height: 8 ft 4 in (254 cm)

Bernard A. Coyne (July 27, 1897 – May 20, 1921) was an American who was one of the tallest and one of only 29 individuals in medical history to have stood 8 feet (240 cm) or more. Coyne may have reached a height of 8 feet 4 inches (2.54 m) tall at the time of his death in 1921. His World War I draft registration card, dated August 29, 1918, lists his height as 8 feet (240 cm). The Guinness Book of World Records stated that he was refused induction into the Army when he stood at a height of 7 feet 9 inches (236 cm).

Coyne was the tallest ever eunuchoidal infantile giant, a condition also known as gigantism. He was the tallest person in the world at the time of his death, and like Robert Wadlow, he was still growing. He reportedly wore size 24 (American) shoes.

Bernard Coyne died in 1921. He is buried in Anthon, Iowa, in a specially-made, extra-large coffin.

Preceded by Unknown: Closest is John Rogan	Tallest Recognized Person; 1915? – 1921	Succeeded by Unknown: Closest is Robert Wadlow
