= Zhang Juncai =

Chinese tall man

- 張俊才
- Born: Dingxiang County, Xinzhou, Shanxi, China
- Known for: fifth-tallest living person
- Height: 7 ft 11.3 in (242.1 cm)

Zhang Juncai (Chinese: 張俊才) is one of the world's tallest people, standing at least 2.42 meters (7 ft 11 in) tall. He is notable for visiting Yao Defen.

== Biography ==
He is from Shanxi Province, China. Zhang was verified as China's tallest man on 23 November 2010 at 2.42 meters (7 ft 11 in). He went to the hospital in April 2009, to visit his friend, the 2.33-meter (7 ft 8 in) tallest living woman Yao Defen.
