= Radhouane Charbib =

Tallest man between 1998–2005

- Born: Ridwan Sharbib; October 27, 1968 (age 56); Ras Jebel, Tunisia
- Occupation: Former world record holder
- Height: 7 ft 8.87 in (235.89 cm)

Radhouane Charbib (Arabic: رضوان شربيب Ridwan Sharbeeb, born October 27, 1968) was recognized by the Guinness Book of Records as the tallest living man, until January 15, 2005 when Bao Xishun was measured at Chifeng City Hospital, Inner Mongolia, China, and was recorded as being 2 millimeters taller.

Preceded by Alam Channa	Tallest Recognized Person; July 1998 – January 2005	Succeeded by Bao Xishun
