= Alton Museum of History and Art =

History museum in Alton, Illinois

Coordinates: 38°54′11″N 90°08′41″W

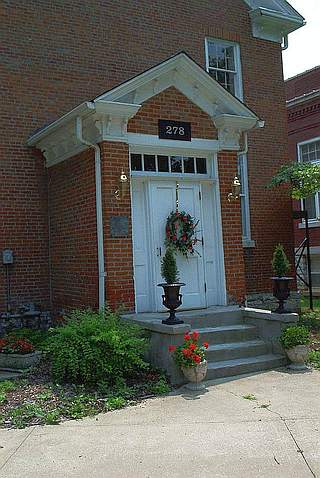
- Loomis Hall in 2012
- Former name: Robert Wadlow Museum
- Established: 1971
- Dissolved: 2020
- Location: Loomis Hall, Alton, Illinois
- Type: History museum

The Alton Museum of History and Art, sometimes known as the Robert Wadlow Museum, in Alton, Illinois was founded in 1971 as a not for profit organization. It is located in Loomis Hall, named for Rev. Hubbel Loomis, on the grounds of the former Rock Spring Alton Baptist Seminary established by missionary John Mason Peck, later renamed Shurtleff College, and presently the home of the Southern Illinois University School of Dental Medicine. The building, which has Underground Railroad history, was constructed as the original chapel/classroom of the seminary c.1820 and the sanctuary was modified in the early 1900s to be a two-story building with a rear classroom and laboratory addition. The building is the state's second oldest remaining college building.

Although most known for its collection related to Robert Wadlow (the Alton Giant), it also has exhibits on Lewis & Clark, the Alton Confederate Prison and the Lincoln–Douglas debates as well as that of the region's Native American populations. It serves to help preserve the history and heritage of its community; it continues to demonstrate the artistic interests and achievement of its residents.

The museum also owns two homes in the town, the Koenig House and the Wilhelm House, which were donated to the museum by Corida Koenig Hanna in 1987. The Koenig House was repaired in 1990, but both homes present challenges for the museum despite their uses for programming.

The museum temporarily closed in 2020 due to the COVID-19 pandemic and remains closed as of 2024.
