= Lengau =

- Municipality
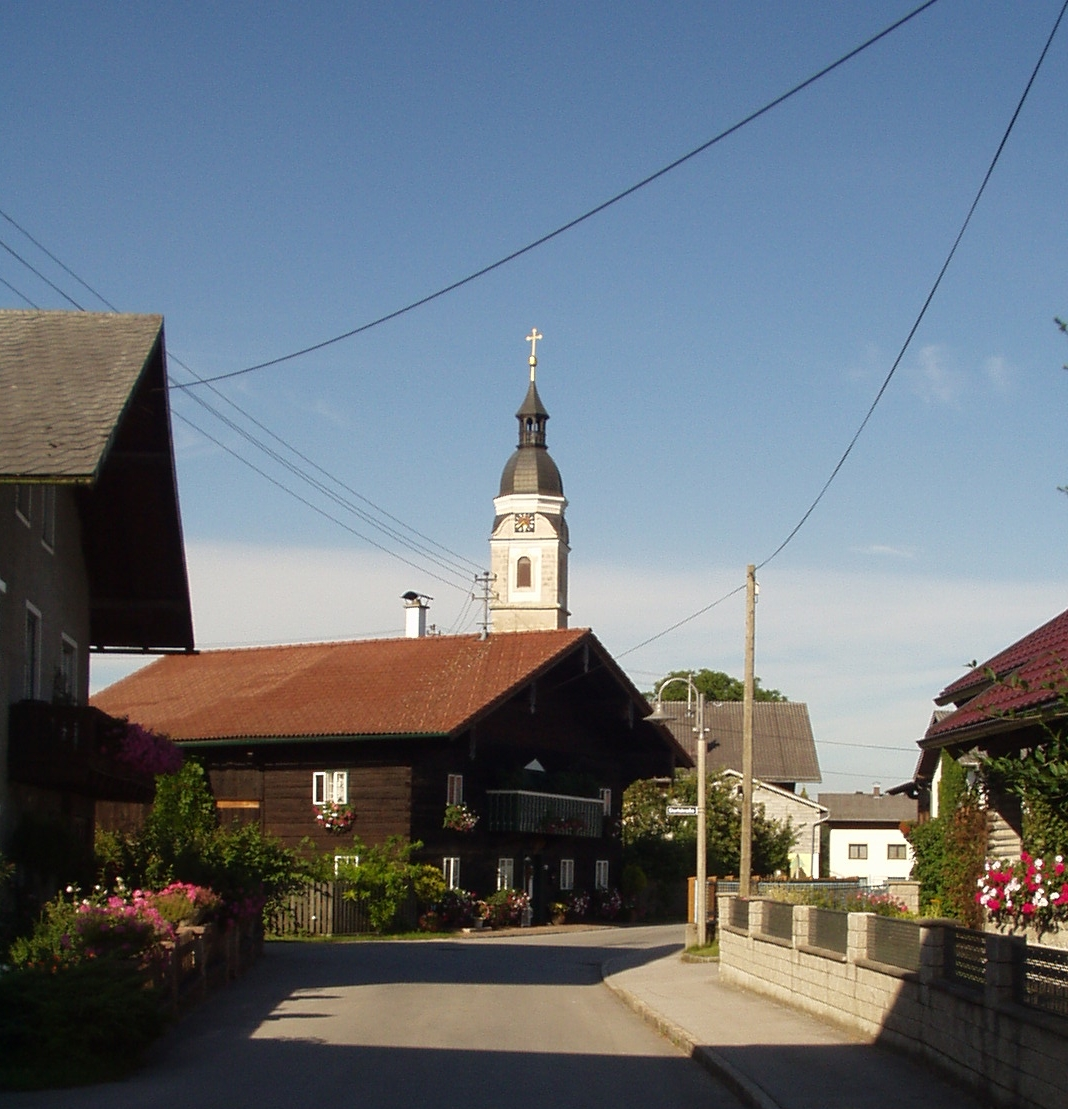

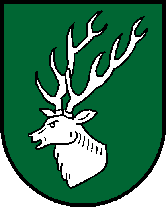
- Coat of arms

- Location within Austria
- Coordinates: 48°00′00″N 13°13′00″E
- Country: Austria
- State: Upper Austria
- District: Braunau am Inn

Government
  - Mayor: Erich Rippl (SPÖ)

Area
  - Total: 58.09 km^{2} (22.43 sq mi)
- Elevation: 532 m (1,745 ft)

Population (2018-01-01)
  - Total: 4,738
  - Density: 81.56/km^{2} (211.2/sq mi)
- Time zone: UTC+1 (CET)
  - Summer (DST): UTC+2 (CEST)
- Postal code: 5211
- Area code: 07746
- Vehicle registration: BR
- Website: www.gemeindelengau.at

Lengau is a municipality in the district of Braunau am Inn in the Austrian state of Upper Austria.
