= Chris Wadlow =

British solicitor

Christopher Michael Wadlow is a British solicitor who is Professor of Law at the University of East Anglia. He qualified as a solicitor in 1981 and practised with Simmons & Simmons in London until joining the University of East Anglia full-time as a Reader in 2004. He was appointed to a Chair in 2008. As a Christ's College, Cambridge graduate in Natural Sciences his major specialisation in practice was patent litigation, often with an international dimension. In Norwich, Wadlow teaches intellectual property. His main research interests are in or closely related to intellectual property and have three central themes: the place of the common law passing-off action within a wider category of unfair competition law; the public and private international law of intellectual property, including the potential for extraterritorial enforcement; and the harmonisation of substantive European patent law and patent litigation procedure.

== Bibliography ==
- The Unitary EU Patent System (edited with Justine Pila, Hart Publishing, 2015)
- The Law of Passing-off: Unfair Competition by Misrepresentation (3rd ed: Sweet and Maxwell: London 2004) and supplement (2005)
- Enforcement of Intellectual Property in European and International Law (Sweet and Maxwell London 1998)
