= Trijntje Keever =

Tallest woman ever

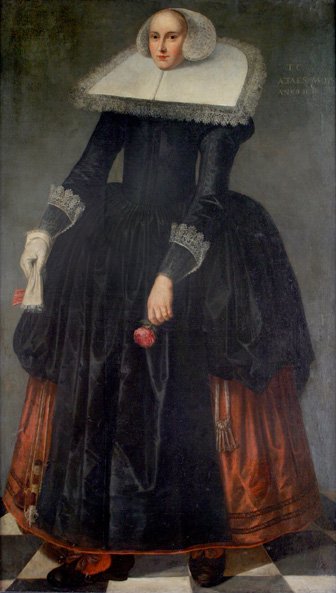
- Born: Trijntje Cornelisdochter Keever; 16 April 1616; Edam, Dutch Republic
- Died: 2 July 1633 (aged 17); Ter Veen, Dutch Republic
- Known for: Tallest female in recorded history (alleged); Third-tallest person ever (alleged)
- Height: 8 ft 6.5 in or 2.60 m

Trijntje Cornelisdochter Keever (10 or 16 April 1616 – 2 July 1633), nicknamed De Groote Meid ('The Tall Girl'), was a Dutchwoman alleged to be the tallest female in recorded history, standing 9 Amsterdam feet, an archaic measurement used in the Netherlands which measured 1 foot as 28.313 cm or 0.929 feet. In modern measurements, she measured 2.60 metres (8 ft 6.75 in) tall at the time of her death at age seventeen.

== Biography ==
Trijntje Keever was the daughter of Cornelis Keever and Anna Pouwels. Cornelis was a Dutch skipper and Anna was his maid; he married her on May 24, 1605. Trijntje was born on April 10 or 16, 1616, in Edam.

Keever's parents took her to carnivals to earn some money by letting people see her. Trijntje first received public attention when she was nine years old and had reached the height of 2 metres (6 ft 7 in). A royal company consisting of the Bohemian king Frederick V, Elector Palatine, his wife Elizabeth of Bohemia and the princess Amalia of Solms-Braunfels, living in The Hague at the time, visited her, curious about the "nine-year-old girl taller than every man in Europe".

Keever died of cancer at the age of 17 in Ter Veen. She was buried on 7 July 1633 in Edam, her town of birth. Her epitaph is said to have read, Trijntje Crelis groote meidt oudt 17 jaer, or, in English: “Trijntje Crelis, tall girl, 17 years of age”. In the townhall of Edam is a lifesize painting by an unknown artist portraying Keever in civilian clothes with a belt, holding at her right a keyring and at her left a pincushion and a sheath with a knife, fork, and spoon.

Her original shoes are also on display. If there were a size for the shoes, they would be European size 54 (36 cm or 14 inches long).

== See also ==
- List of tallest people
- Robert Wadlow, the tallest recorded person
- Zeng Jinlian, the tallest woman verified in modern times
