= Zeng Jinlian =

Tallest woman verified in modern times

- Born: 26 June 1964; Yuanjiang, Hunan, China
- Died: 13 February 1982 (aged 17); Yuanjiang, Hunan, China
- Known for: Tallest verified female ever
- Height: 246.3 cm (8 ft 1.0 in)

Zeng Jinlian (simplified Chinese: 曾金莲; traditional Chinese: 曾金蓮; pinyin: Zēng Jīnlián, 26 June 1964 – 13 February 1982) was a Chinese teenage girl who was the tallest woman of her time at 246.3 centimetres (8 ft 1.0 in), surpassing Jane Bunford's record. Following the death of Don Koehler, Zeng was the tallest living person from 1981 to 1982, during which time she surpassed fellow "eight-footers" Gabriel Estêvão Monjane and Suleiman Ali Nashnush.

== Biography ==
Zeng was born on 26 June 1964 in Yuanjiang, Hunan, to a poor farming family, as the youngest of four children, (Note: Zeng has three brothers, as confirmed by interviews with her, her parents and family photos, but due to a common misinterpretation that originates from a photo of Zeng posing with two other girls, Zeng is sometimes reported as having one brother and two sisters.) growing up in Nanzui Town by Muping Lake. Her parents Zeng Xianmao and Yu Xuemei (Note: Both are listed by the Wade-Giles spelling of their names, Tseng Hsien-mao and Yu Hsueh-mei, in most English sources) were 163 centimetres (5 ft 4 in) and 158 centimetres (5 ft 2 in), respectively, with all her siblings being in within similar height range, with a brother being measured at 158 centimetres (5 ft 2 in) at age 18. According to the family genealogy, however, Zeng had a great-granduncle who was recorded at 233 centimetres (7 ft 8 in) in height.

The cause of Zeng's gigantism was a tumor that caused her pituitary gland to overproduce human growth hormone. Her abnormal height development started when she was four months old. Zeng outgrew her mother by age five and at age 13, she stood 232 centimetres (7 ft 7 in), taller than the tallest man Robert Wadlow was at the same age, at 224 centimetres (7 ft 4 in). Zeng still attended school, starting at age 7 and graduating in 1980.

At age 16, Zeng was measured at 240 centimetres (7 ft 10 in) and weighed 147 kg (324 lbs) during a routine medical check for her diabetes, and only months later, within the same year, she overtook then-record holder Jane Bunford in height. Doctors proposed brain surgery to remove the tumor, but Zeng declined due to fear of medical intervention and a desire to keep her hair. By this point, Zeng had garnered regional prominence for her unusual stature, which led to visitors regularly coming to her home to meet her, almost a hundred on a single day during visiting peak. The local government provided Zeng with a yearly payment equivalent to US$670 (equivalent to $2,618 in 2025) to cover some of her living expenses. While she and her family mostly subsisted off fish from the nearby lake, Zeng reportedly ate 20 dumplings for breakfast and six bowls of rice with vegetables for dinner each day, consuming around 500 kg (1102 lbs) of food each year.

Zeng was generally described as being shy and reserved, but she was noted to have a passion for literature such as magazines and detective novels, as well as sports, particularly basketball, though she eventually stopped due to developing scoliosis related to her increasing height. She and her family noted that in addition to her long length of limbs, with her hands measuring 25.5 cm (10 in) and her feet 35.5 cm (1 ft 2 in) in length, Zeng was also physically strong, having reportedly been able to carry a bag of cement weighing 48 kg (108 lbs) at age four. She remained at home following the end of her school attendance due to her diabetes. To accommodate her great height, Zeng's family were contracted with local tailors and factories to manufacture several of her items custom-made, including her shirts, pants, shoes, chairs and bed, which measured 274 cm (9 ft) in length.

Zeng became known outside of China following her introduction in the Chinese health press. In interviews, Zeng voiced her appreciation for her friends and neighbors for treating her kindly and commented that despite her fame, she did not intend to leave her rural home county and planned to stay in the countryside for the rest of her life.

In March 1981, Zeng's issues with scoliosis and diabetes worsened. Because the curvature of her spine prevented Zeng from standing up straight, the Guinness World Records did not recognize Zeng as the world's tallest standing woman when they considered her for entry in 1981; Zeng's back problems eventually left her unable to walk and rely on a wheelchair for mobility.

== Death ==
Zeng died from complications of diabetes on 13 February 1982 in Yuanjiang while in hospital care, where she had been since December 1981. With her death, American woman Sandy Allen, standing 232 cm (7 ft 7 in) became the tallest living woman, while Mozambican Gabriel Estêvão Monjane became the tallest living person. Attending doctors reported that during her three month stay, Zeng had still been growing.

== See also ==
- List of tallest people
- Trijntje Keever and Ella Ewing, two women who may have been taller than Zeng Jinlian, although their exact heights are difficult to officially verify
- Robert Wadlow, the tallest man in history
- Zhang Ziyu, the tallest woman alive
- Sultan Kösen, the tallest man alive

== Notes ==
Records
Preceded by Jane Bunford	Tallest recognized woman 1982	Succeeded by Sandy Allen
Preceded by Don Koehler	Tallest recognized person 1982	Succeeded by Gabriel Estêvão Monjane
Preceded by Jane Bunford	Tallest recognized woman ever 1982 - present	Succeeded by -
