= Sultan Kösen =

Tallest living man (born 1982)

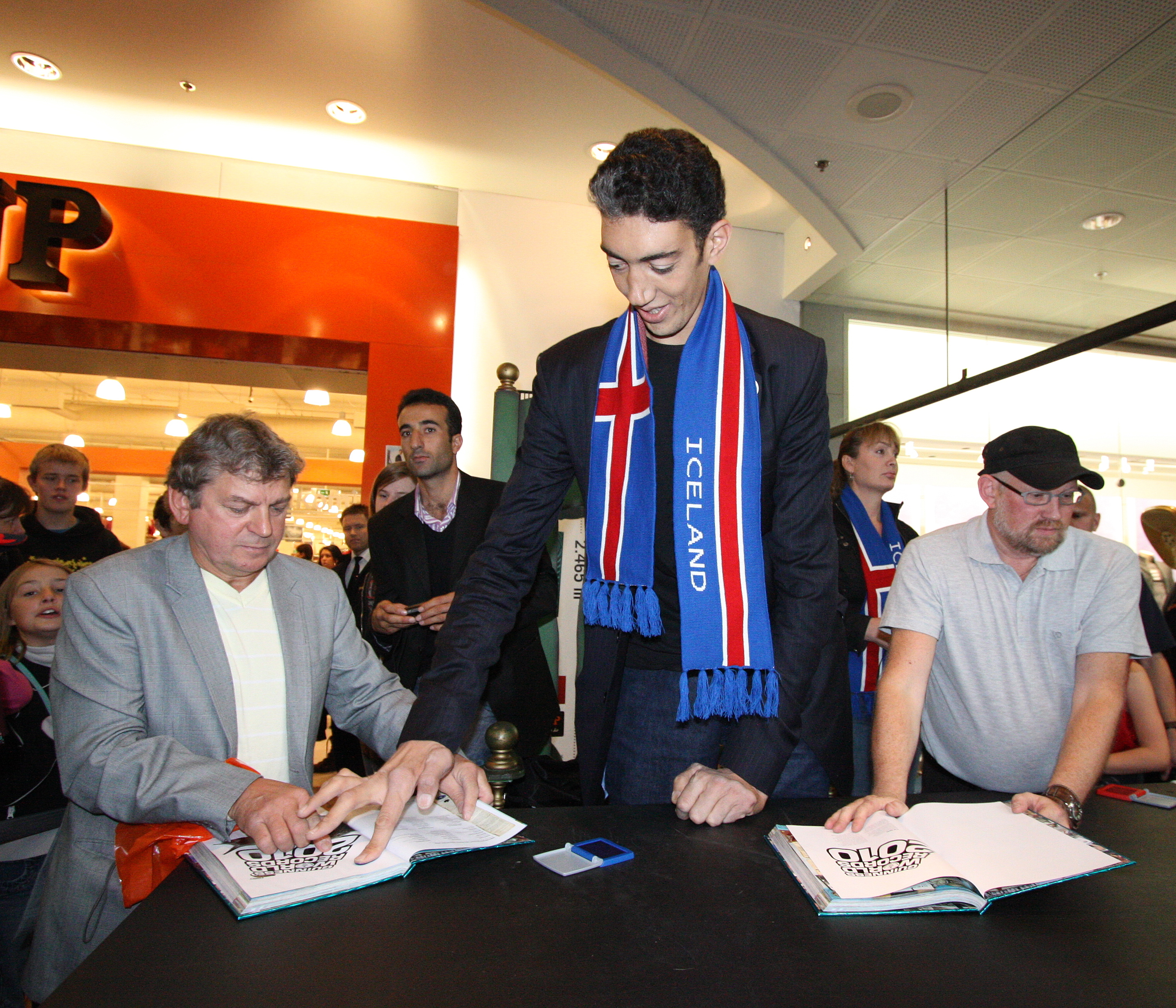
- Kösen in 2009
- Born: 10 December 1982 (age 43); Alibey, Mardin, Turkey
- Occupation: Farmer
- Known for: Tallest living man 7th verified tallest person in history
- Height: 251 cm (8 ft 3 in)
- Spouse: Merve Dibo (m. 2013; div. 2021)

Sultan Kösen (born 10 December 1982) is a Turkish farmer who holds the Guinness World Record for tallest living person at 251 cm (8 ft 2.82 in).

Kösen's growth resulted from the conditions gigantism and acromegaly, caused by a tumour affecting his pituitary gland. Due to his condition, he uses crutches to walk.

== Biography ==
Kösen, a Turkish man of ethnic Kurdish descent, was born in the village of Alibey in Mardin Province of Turkey. Kösen was unable to complete his education because of his height; he instead worked part-time as a farmer. He describes the advantages of being tall as being able to see a great distance and being able to help his family with domestic tasks such as changing light bulbs and hanging curtains. He lists disadvantages as not being able to find clothes for his legs measuring 126 cm (49.61 in) and for his arms with a sleeve length measuring 97 cm (38.19 in) or shoes that fit, as well as finding it difficult to fit into an average-sized car. His left foot measures 36.5 cm (14.4 in) and his right foot measures 35.5 cm (14.0 in), whereas his hands are the longest measured in a living person at 28.5 cm (11.2 in).

From 2002 to 2003, Kösen briefly played for Turkish basketball club Galatasaray S.K.

Starting in 2010, Kösen received Gamma Knife treatment for his pituitary tumour at the University of Virginia Medical School and was provided with medication to control his excessive levels of growth hormone. It was confirmed in March 2012 that the treatment was effective in halting Kösen's growth.

In October 2013, Kösen married Syrian-born Merve Dibo. In an interview, he said that his biggest problem with his wife was communication, as he speaks Turkish but his wife spoke only Arabic. The pair divorced in 2021 citing the language barrier as one of the key problems.

On 13 November 2014, as part of Guinness World Records Day, Kösen met, for the first time, the world's shortest man ever recorded, Chandra Bahadur Dangi (54.6 cm (1 ft 9 1/2 in), at an event in London. The difference between their heights was 196.4 cm (6 ft 5.32 in).

In 2014, Kösen joined the Magic Circus of Samoa and participated in various shows around the world.

In 2022, he celebrated his 40th birthday by visiting the Ripley's Believe It or Not! museum in Orlando, Florida, United States, and posing next to a life-sized statue of Robert Wadlow, the tallest man ever recorded, at 272 cm (8 ft 11.1 in).

== Records ==
On 25 August 2009, Kösen's standing height was recorded at 246.4 cm (8 ft 1 in) in his home country by Guinness World Records, overtaking former world record holder Bao Xishun, who stands 236.1 cm (7 ft 8 15/16 in) tall. Kösen also holds the current Guinness record for the largest hands, at 27.5 cm (10 7/8 in), and the second-largest feet: 36.5 cm (14 3/8 in) (left foot) and 35.5 cm (14 in) (right foot).

On 25 August 2010, according to the University of Virginia, a height of up to 254.3 cm (8 ft 4 1/8 in) had been confirmed by doctors, who stated that this might be Kösen's actual height, artificially lowered by scoliosis and bad posture.

On 9 February 2011, Kösen was remeasured by Guinness World Records at 251 cm (8 ft 2 7/8 in). They also remeasured his hands at 28 cm (11 in), which broke his previous record.

A 2026 Channel 4 documentary called The World's Tallest Man the Next Chapter featured Kösen.

== See also ==
- List of tallest people
- Robert Wadlow, the tallest man in recorded history
- Rumeysa Gelgi, the tallest woman alive (also from Turkey)
- Zeng Jinlian, the tallest woman in recorded history

Preceded by Bao Xishun	Tallest Recognized Person; 17 September 2009 –	Succeeded by Incumbent
