= Robert Wadlow =

Tallest person in recorded history (1918–1940)

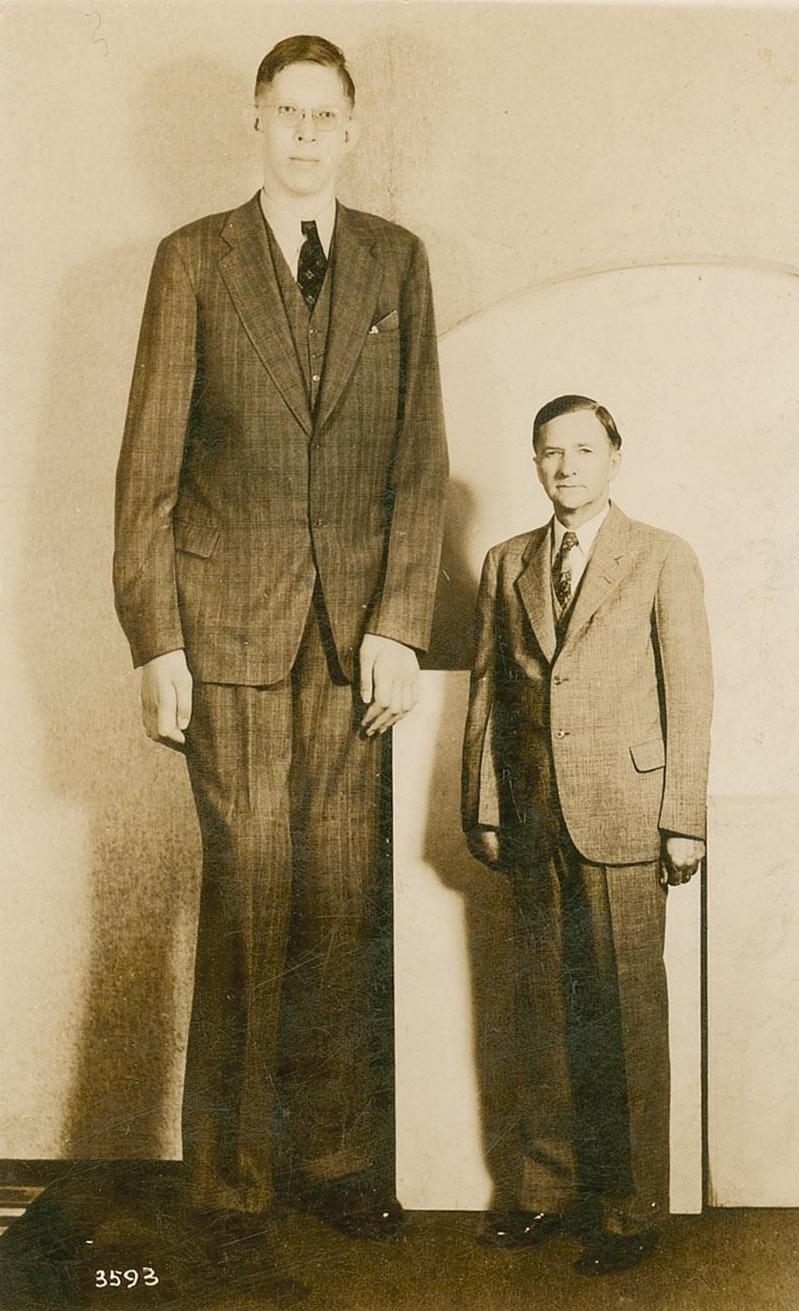
- Wadlow (left) with his father (who was 5 ft 11.5 in (1.82 m))
- Born: Robert Pershing Wadlow; February 22, 1918; Alton, Illinois, U.S.
- Died: July 15, 1940 (aged 22); Manistee, Michigan, U.S.
- Burial place: Oakwood Cemetery, Alton, Illinois
- Other names: The Gentle Giant; The Tallest Man Who Ever Lived; The Gentleman Giant; The Boy Giant; The Alton Giant; The Giant of Illinois
- Occupation: Advertiser
- Known for: Tallest verified human in recorded history
- Height: 8 ft 11.1 in (272.0 cm)

Robert Pershing Wadlow (February 22, 1918 – July 15, 1940), also known as the Alton Giant and the Giant of Illinois, was an American man known for being the tallest person in recorded history for whom there is irrefutable evidence. Wadlow was born and raised in Alton, Illinois, a small city near St. Louis, Missouri.

Wadlow's height was 8 ft 11.1 in (2.72 m) while his weight reached 439 lb (199 kg) at his death at age 22. His great size and his continued growth in adulthood were due to hypertrophy of his pituitary gland, which results in an abnormally high level of human growth hormone (HGH).

== Early life ==
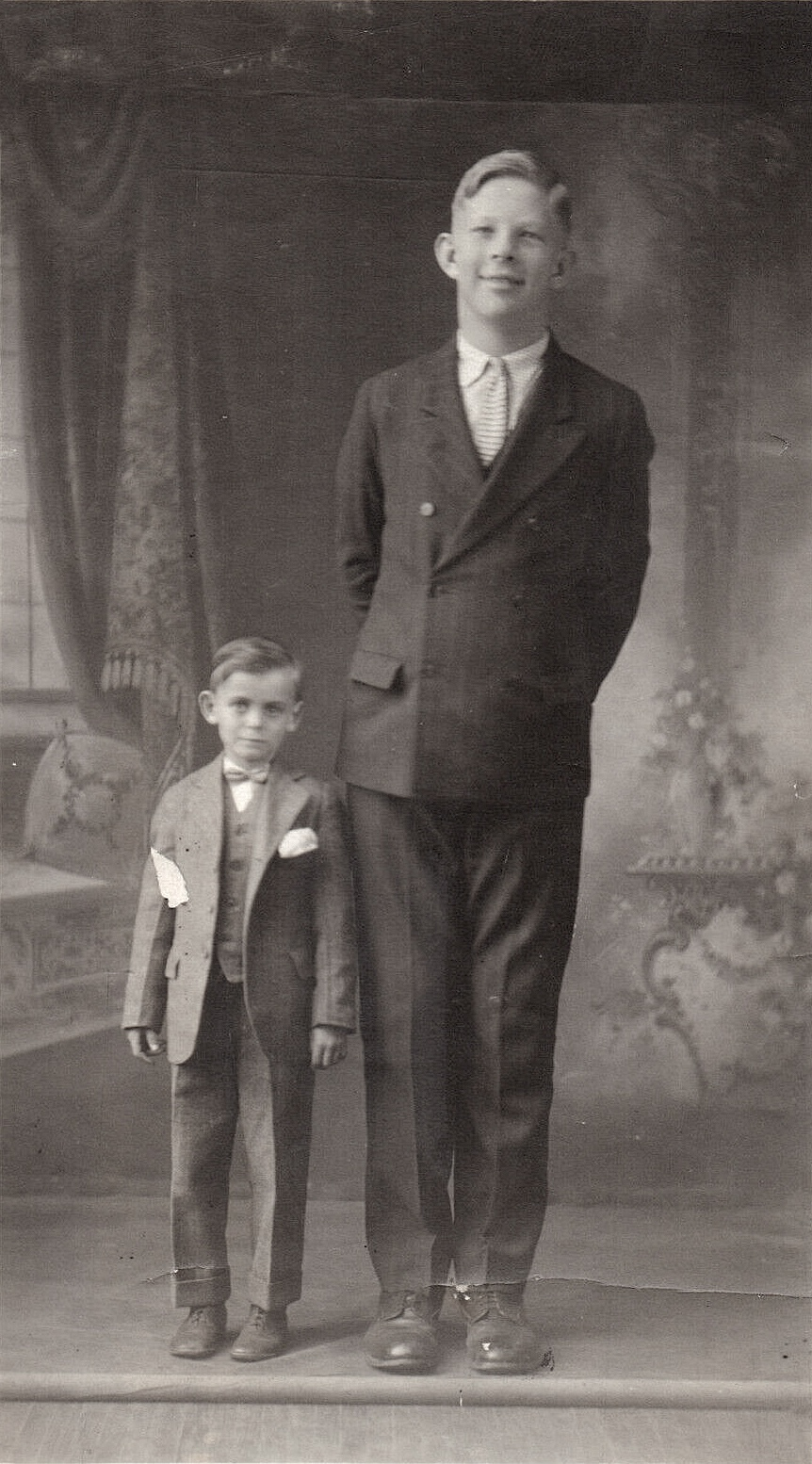
Wadlow, aged 9, beside a 10-year-old neighbor, circa January 1928.

Wadlow was born in Alton, Illinois, on February 22, 1918, to Harold Franklin and Addie May (née Johnson) Wadlow, with a typical birth weight of 8 lb 5 oz (3.77 kg) and was the oldest of five children. He was taller than his father by age 8, and in elementary school a special desk was made for him. His pituitary gland condition was diagnosed at the age of twelve. At the time, corrective surgery was dangerous and not guaranteed to work, so his parents decided against intervening.

He attended Alton High School, where he was involved in the German Club and Camera Club. By the time of his graduation in 1936, he was 8 ft 4 in (254 cm). He enrolled in Shurtleff College with the intention of studying law.

== Adulthood ==
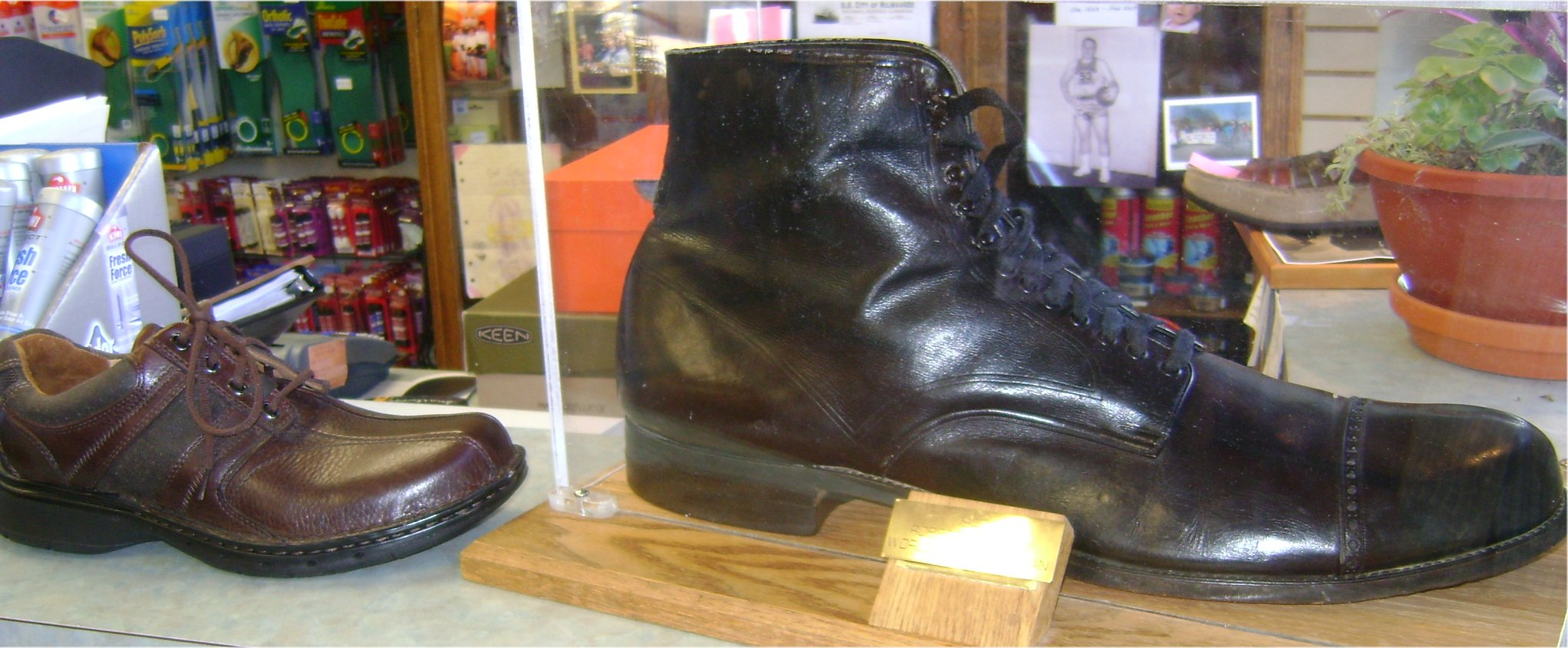
Wadlow's shoe (US size 37 AA; UK size 36 or approximately European size 75) compared to a US size 12

Wadlow required leg braces when walking and had little feeling in his legs and feet, but he never used a wheelchair.

Wadlow became a celebrity after his 1936 U.S. tour with the Ringling Brothers Circus, appearing at Madison Square Garden and the Boston Garden in the center ring (never in the sideshow). During his appearances, he dressed in his everyday clothes and refused the circus's request that he wear a top hat and tails.

In 1938, he began a promotional tour with the International Shoe Company, which provided him shoes free of charge, again only in his everyday street clothes. Wadlow saw himself as working in advertising, not exhibiting as a freak. He possessed great physical strength until the last few days of his life.

Wadlow belonged to the Order of DeMolay, the Masonic-sponsored organization for young men, and was later a Freemason. By November 1939, Wadlow was a Master Mason under the jurisdiction of the Grand Lodge of Illinois A.F.& A.M.

One year before his death, Wadlow passed John Rogan as the tallest person ever recorded. On June 27, 1940 (18 days before his death), he was measured by doctors at 8 ft 11.1 in (2.72 m).

== Death ==
On July 4, 1940, during a professional appearance at the Manistee National Forest Festival, a faulty brace irritated his ankle, leading to infection. He was treated with a blood transfusion and surgery, but his condition worsened and he died in his sleep on July 15.

His coffin measured 10 ft 9 in (3.28 m) long by 2 ft 8 in (0.81 m) wide by 2 ft 6 in (0.76 m) deep, weighed over 1,000 lb (450 kg), and was carried by twelve pallbearers and eight assistants. He was buried at Oakwood Cemetery in Alton, Illinois.

== Legacy ==
A life-size statue of Wadlow was erected opposite the Alton Museum of History and Art in 1986. He is one of the Guinness World Records ICONS of 2025.

Exhibits dedicated to Wadlow are featured in many Ripley's Believe It or Not! attractions, each featuring a life-size wax or animatronic figure of him.

== Height chart ==
Height and weight of Robert Wadlow, by age of measurement
Age	Height	Weight	Notes	Size of	Date
Birth	1 ft 8 in (0.51 m)	8 lb 5 oz (3.8 kg)	Normal height and weight	Average newborn	February 22, 1918
6 months	2 ft 10 1/2 in (0.88 m)	30 lb (14 kg)		2-year-old	August 22, 1918
1 year	3 ft 6 in (1.07 m)	45 lb (20 kg)	When he began to walk at 11 months, he was 3 ft 3 1/2 in (1.00 m) tall and weighed 40 lb (18 kg).	5-year-old	February 22, 1919
18 months	4 ft 3 1/4 in (1.30 m)	67 lb (30 kg)		8-year-old	August 22, 1919
2 years	4 ft 6 1/4 in (1.38 m)	75 lb (34 kg)		10-year-old	1920
3 years	4 ft 11 in (1.50 m)	89 lb (40 kg)		12-year-old	1921
4 years	5 ft 3 in (1.60 m)	105 lb (48 kg)		14-year-old	1922
5 years	5 ft 6 1/2 in (1.69 m)	140 lb (64 kg)	At 5 years of age, attending kindergarten, Wadlow was 5 ft 6 1/2 in (1.69 m) tall. He wore clothes that would fit a 17-year-old boy.	15-year-old	1923
6 years	5 ft 7 in (1.70 m)	146 lb (66 kg)		Height of average adult male (global average).	1924
7 years	5 ft 10 in (1.78 m)	159 lb (72 kg)		Height of average adult male in the United States.	1925
8 years	6 ft 0 in (1.83 m)	169 lb (77 kg)		Height of average adult male in the Netherlands.	1926
9 years	6 ft 2 1/2 in (1.89 m)	180 lb (82 kg)	Weighing 180 lb (82 kg), he was strong enough to carry his father (who was sitting in a living room chair) up the stairs to the second floor.		1927
10 years	6 ft 5 in (1.96 m)	211 lb (96 kg)			1928
11 years	6 ft 11 in (2.11 m)	241 lb (109 kg)			1929
12 years	7 ft 0 in (2.13 m)	287 lb (130 kg)			1930
13 years	7 ft 4 in (2.24 m)	270 lb (120 kg)	World's tallest Boy Scout		1931
14 years	7 ft 5 in (2.26 m)	331 lb (150 kg)			1932
15 years	7 ft 10 in (2.39 m)	354 lb (161 kg)			1933
16 years	8 ft 1 1/4 in (2.47 m)	374 lb (170 kg)			1934
17 years	8 ft 3 in (2.51 m)	382 lb (173 kg)	Graduated from high school on January 8, 1936 (not yet 18)	Sultan Kösen, who is, as of 2024, the tallest currently living man.	1935
18 years	8 ft 4 in (2.54 m)	391 lb (177 kg)			1936
19 years	8 ft 6 1/2 in (2.60 m)	480 lb (220 kg)			1937
20 years	8 ft 7 1/4 in (2.62 m)	488 lb (221 kg)			1938
21 years	8 ft 8 in (2.64 m)	491 lb (223 kg)			1939
22.4 years	8 ft 11.1 in (2.72 m)	439 lb (199 kg)	At death, he was the world's tallest man, according to Guinness World Records.		June 27, 1940

== See also ==
- Acromegaly
- Gigantism
- List of tallest people
- Trijntje Keever, the alleged tallest woman in recorded history
- Zeng Jinlian, the tallest woman officially confirmed by Guinness World Records in recorded history
- Sultan Kösen, the tallest man alive
- Siddiqa Parveen
- Adam Rainer, the only known human ever to be documented as both a dwarf and a giant

Records
Preceded by John Rogan	Tallest recognized person ever 1939–present	Incumbent
