= Pohl =

Pohl is a German surname of several possible origins.

Notable people with the surname include:

== 16th−19th centuries ==
- David Pohl (or Pohle; 1624–1695), German composer of the Baroque era
- Johann Baptist Emanuel Pohl (1782–1834), Austrian botanist
- Johann Ehrenfried Pohl (1746–1800), German botanist and physician

== 19th century ==
=== Arts and entertainment ===
- Anton Carl Ferdinand Pohl (1819–1887), German-Austrian music historian, archivist, and composer
- Richard Pohl (1826–1896), German composer and music author
- Franz Pohl (1864–1920), outsider artist
- Joseph Pohl (1864–1939), German botanical artist
- Adolph Joseph Pohl (1872–1930), Austrian artist and academic sculptor
- Klaus Pohl (1883–1958), Austrian film actor
- Max Pohl (1885–1935), Austrian stage and film actor
- Hermine "Hertha" Pohl (1889–1954), German writer
- Frederick J. Pohl (1889–1991), American playwright, literary critic, editor, and author

=== Science ===
- Julius Pohl (1861–1942), Austrian-German pharmacologist
- Esther Pohl Lovejoy (1869–1967), American physician and public health pioneer
- Robert Wichard Pohl (1884–1976), German physicist

=== Sports, military, and other ===
- Caroline Pohl (1851–1908), brothel proprietor and local identity of the Little Lon district in Melbourne, Australia
- Hugo von Pohl (1855–1916), German admiral
- Oswald Pohl (1892–1951), German SS officer executed for war crimes
- Maximilian Ritter von Pohl (1893–1951), German army and air force (Luftwaffe) officer
- Erich Pohl (1894–1948), German international footballer

== 20th century ==
=== Arts and entertainment ===
- Anna Neethling-Pohl (1906–1992), South African actress, performer and film producer
- Louis Pohl (1915–1999), American artist
- Frederik Pohl (1919–2013), American science fiction writer
- Witta Pohl (1937–2011), German actress

=== Science ===
- Herbert A. Pohl (Herbert Ackland, 1916–1986), discoverer of dielectrophoretic cell separation technology
- Erika Pohl-Ströher (1919–2016), German business executive, heiress, and collector of minerals
- William Francis Pohl (1937–1988), American mathematician
- Robert Otto Pohl (1929–2024), German-American physicist

=== Sportspeople ===
- Herbert Pohl (1916–2010), German international footballer
- Leonhard Pohl (1929–2014), German athlete
- Ernest Pohl (1932–1995), Polish football (soccer) player

=== Other ===
- Hermann Pohl (fl. 1910–1930), member of the Thule Society and the founder of the Germanenorden, ariosophic lodge in c. 1910–1930
- Reynaldo Galindo Pohl (1918–2012), Salvadoran lawyer and diplomat
- Karl Otto Pohl (1929–2015), German economist and Bundesbank head
- Gerhard Pohl (1937–2012), German politician
- Emmanuel Clive Pohl (An Australian businessman (investment manager) and philanthropist)

== Living people ==
- Jürgen Pohl (born 1964), German politician
- Ines Pohl (b. 1967), German journalist
- James L. Pohl (fl. 1978–), American lawyer and officer in the United States Army
- Emmanuel Clive Pohl, (born 1953), Businessman and Philanthropist

=== Arts and entertainment ===
- Kalle Pohl (1951), German comedian and actor
- Emily Pohl-Weary (1973), Canadian novelist, poet and university professor
- Lucie Pohl (1983), German-American actress and stand-up comedian
- Martin Pohl (1986), Czech rapper professionally known as Řezník
- Avery Kristen Pohl (2001), American actress and ballerina, best known for her portrayal of Esme Prince on the American soap opera General Hospital
- Markus Pohl (fl. 2005–), German musician and member of the German power metal band Mystic Prophecy

=== Historians ===
- Manfred Pohl (1944), German business historian
- Sabine Bergmann-Pohl (1946), German politician
- Walter Pohl (1953), Austrian historian and author
- Dieter Pohl (historian) (1964), German historian

=== Scientists and engineers ===
- Dieter Pohl (physicist) (1938), German/Swiss physicist
- Peter Pohl (1940), Swedish writer and mathematician
- Heinz-Dieter Pohl (1942), Austrian linguist
- Klaus Pohl (computer scientist) (1960), German professor of software systems engineering
- Jason Pohl (1981), chopper designer

=== Sportspeople ===
==== Ball sports ====
- Danny Joe Pohl (1955), American professional golfer
- Carsten Pohl (1965), German professional basketball coach
- Stephanie Pohl (1978), German beach volleyball player
- Shannon Pohl (1980), American badminton player
- Martin Pohl (1981), German former footballer
- Jannik Pohl (1996), Danish football forward

==== Ice hockey ====
- John Pohl (1979), American professional ice hockey player
- Kristin Elizabeth "Krissy" Wendell-Pohl (1981), American women's ice hockey player
- Petr Pohl (1986), Czech professional ice hockey player
- Patrick Pohl (1990), German professional ice hockey forward

==== Swimmers ====
- Marlies Pohl (1955), German former swimmer
- Stefan Pohl (1978), German former swimmer
- Nathalie Pohl (1994), German swimmer

==== Other types of sport ====
- Günther Pohl (1939), German long-distance and ultramarathon runner
- Klaus-Jürgen Pohl (1941), German former wrestler
- Hans-Peter Pohl (1965), German former winter sports athlete and Olympic skier in the Nordic combined discipline
- Stephanie Gaumnitz (née Pohl; 1987), German retired racing cyclist
- Michael Pohl (1989), German athlete

== Other uses ==
- Ernest Pohl Stadium, also called Górnik Zabrze Stadium, a multi-purpose stadium in Zabrze, Poland, named for Ernest Pohl

== See also ==
- Pöhl
- Pohl commutator
- Pohlman
- von Pohl
- Pohle (disambiguation)
- Pole (disambiguation)
- Poll (disambiguation)
