= Pol =

Pol or POL may refer to:

== Places ==
- Pol State, a former princely state in Gujarat, western India; originally Vijaynagar State after its first capital
- Pol, Iran, a city in Khamir County, Hormozgan province, Iran
- Pol, Lugo, a municipality in Spain
- River Pol, a small river in Cornwall, England
- POL, ISO-3166-1 alpha-3 code for the country of Poland

== Codes ==
- POL, International Olympic Committee country code for Poland - see List of IOC country codes
- pol, ISO 639-2 and ISO 639-3 language codes for the Polish language

== Transport ==
- POL, IATA airport code for Pemba Airport (Mozambique)
- POL, National Rail station code for Polsloe Bridge railway station, Devon, England
- POL, an abbreviation for port of loading

== People ==
=== Given name ===
- Pól, an Irish and Faroese given name, and a list of people so named
- Pol (given name), usually a form of Paul or Polydore, with a list of people so named
  - Pol Pot (1925–1998), Cambodian revolutionary and Communist dictator

=== Surname ===
- Agusti Pol (born 1977), Andorran footballer
- Alejandro Pol Hurtado (born 1990), Venezuelan football midfielder
- Alexander Pol (1832–1890), Ukrainian archaeologist and geologist
- Alice Pol (born 1982), French actress
- Antoine Pol (1888–1971), French poet
- Ben Pol (born 1989), Tanzanian singer and songwriter
- David Pol (born 1973), Canadian football player
- Ernest Pohl, also known as Ernst Pol (1932–1995), Polish footballer
- Ferran Pol (born 1983), Andorran footballer
- Francisco Pol Hurtado (born 1990), Venezuelan football midfielder
- Jan-Harm Pol (born 1942) is a Dutch-American veterinarian
- Miquel Martí i Pol (1929–2003), Catalan poet
- Nicolas Pol (born 1977), French contemporary artist
- Nicolaus Pol (c.1467–1532), Austrian physician and book collector
- Sandra de Pol (born 1975), Swiss footballer
- Santosh Pol (born 1974), Indian serial killer
- Sebastián Pol (born 1988), Argentine footballer
- Talitha Pol (1940–1971), Dutch actress and model, wife of John Paul Getty
- Victor de Pol (1865–1925), Italian-born Argentine sculptor
- Wincenty Pol (1807–1872), Polish poet and geographer

== Fictional characters ==
- Pol (character), in Melanie Rawn's Dragon Prince and Dragon Star trilogies

== Science and technology ==
- Pol (gene)
- POL valve, a fitting found on LPG cylinders
- Pol (HIV), a gene found in retroviruses
- Polystachya, abbreviation of a genus of orchid

== Other uses ==
- HNoMS Pol III, a Norwegian Navy World War II patrol boat
- Pol language, a Bantu language of Cameroon
- Pol (housing), in India, a district in an "old city" area occupied by families of a particular ethnic group or caste
- POL (magazine) (1968?–1986), an Australian monthly magazine
- /pol/, the "politically incorrect" board on 4chan
- Party of the Left, in the Yale Political Union
- "Petroleum, Oil, and Lubricants", Class III of U.S. Armed Forces classes of supply
- Abbreviation for politician

== See also ==
- Van der Pol, Dutch surname
- Pole (disambiguation)
- Pohl (disambiguation)
- Poll (disambiguation)
