= Pol (given name) =

Pol is a male given name. In Europe, it can be a form of Paul or Polydore, and sometimes of Apollonius or Leopold. It is most common in Belgium, Luxembourg, Andorra, and the Catalan speaking regions of Spain. The name in Cambodia and Thailand likely has a different origin. Notable people with this name include:

- Pol Abraham (1891–1966), French architect
- Pol Albrecht (1874–1975), Luxembourg composer, conductor and bandmaster
- Pol Amat (born 1978), Spanish field hockey player
- Pol Anoul (1922–1990), Belgian footballer
- Pol Antràs (born 1975), Spanish economist
- Pol Arias (born 1996), Andorran swimmer
- Pol Boël (1923–2007), Belgian industrialist and politician, grandson of Pol-Clovis
- Pol Clovis Boël (1868–1941), Belgian industrialist and politician
- Pol Braekman (1919–1994), Belgian sprinter
- Pol Bueso (born 1985), Spanish football defender
- Pol Bury (1922–2005), Belgian sculptor
- Pol Calvet (born 1994), Spanish football midfielder
- Pol Carreras (born 1990), Spanish alpine skier
- Pol Chomchuen (born 1959), Thai football coach
- Pol Cruchten (born 1963), Luxembourgian film director and producer
- Pol Demeuter (1904–1934), Belgian motorcycle racer
- Pol Duwez (1907–1984), Belgian material scientist
- Pol Espargaró (born 1991), Spanish Grand Prix motorcycle racer
- Pol Freixanet (born 1991), Spanish football goalkeeper
- Pol García (born 1995), Spanish football defender
- Pol Goffaux (1916–1977), Belgian boxer
- Pol Goossen (born 1949), Belgian film and television actor
- Pol Greisch (1930–2026), Luxembourgian dramatist, writer and actor
- Pol Heyvaert, Belgian stage director and designer
- Pol Hom (born 1946), Cambodian politician
- Pol Hoste (born 1947), Belgian writer
- Alen Pol Kobryn (1949–2023), American poet, novelist, and voice actor
- Pol Le Gourrierec (1921–1995), French diplomat
- Pol de Leon (Paul Aurelian) (died 575), Welsh-Bréton cleric and saint
- Pol Lirola (born 1997), Spanish football defender
- Pol Llonch (born 1992), Spanish football midfielder
- Pol Monen (born 1994), full name Pol Montañés Enrich, better known by his screen name Pol Monen, Spanish actor
- Pol Medina Jr. (born 1962), Filipino cartoonist
- Pol Mercier (1819–1874), French playwright
- Pol de Mont (1857–1931), Belgian writer and poet
- Pol Moya (born 1996), Andorran middle-distance runner
- Pol Pelletier (born 1947), Canadian actor, director, and playwright
- Pol Perritt (1891–1947), American baseball pitcher
- Pol Pla (born 1993), Spanish rugby player
- Pol Plançon (1851–1914), French operatic bass
- Pol Pot (1925–1998), Cambodian revolutionary and Communist dictator
- Pol Roigé (born 1994), Spanish football midfielder
- Pol Rosell (born 1991), Spanish racing driver
- Pol Sax (born 1960), Luxembourg writer
- Pol Schmoetten (born 1958), Luxembourg writer
- Pol Swings (1906–1983), Belgian astrophysicist
- Pol Theis (born 1991), Luxembourger attorney and interior designer
- Pol Toledo Bagué (born 1994), Spanish tennis player
- Pol Valentín (born 1997), Spanish football defender
- Pol Verschuere (born 1955), Belgian road bicycle racer

== See also ==
- Pól, an Irish and Faroese given name
- Pol (disambiguation), for other uses
