= Poling =

Poling may refer to:

- Poling (piezoelectricity), applying a strong electric field across piezoelectric materials
- Poling (horse), in equestrianism, hitting a horse on the legs to encourage it to clear a jump
- Poling System, rating system used to select college football national championship teams from 1924 to 1984
- Poling (metallurgy), a method for purification of copper in metallurgy
- Poling, a procedure for shunting cars on a railway
- Poling, a method of moving small watercraft using a setting pole

== Places ==
- Poling, West Sussex, England
- Poling, Indiana, U.S.
- Poling, West Virginia, U.S.
- Poling Preceptory, a priory in West Sussex, England

== People named Poling ==
- Al Poling (born 1957), American wrestler
- Chan Poling (born 1957), American musician
- Clark V. Poling (1910–1943), American war hero
- Daniel A. Poling (1884–1968), American clergyman
- Daniel Poling (born 1954), American politician
- Eleanor Poling, American radio personality, television host, and actress
- Harold Arthur Poling (1925–2012), American automobile businessman
- Jon Poling (born 1971), American neurologist
- Mary Poling (born 1946), American politician
- Samantha Poling, Scottish journalist

== See also ==
- Polling (disambiguation)
- Pole (disambiguation)
