= Poll =

Poll, polled, or polling may refer to:

== Forms of voting and counting ==
- Poll, a formal election
  - Election verification exit poll, a survey taken to verify election counts
  - Polling, voting to make decisions or determine opinions
  - Polling places or polling station, a.k.a. the polls, where voters cast their ballots in elections
- Poll, a non-formal election:
  - Opinion poll, a survey of public opinion
  - Exit poll, a survey of voters taken immediately after they have exited the polling stations
  - Straw poll, an ad-hoc or unofficial vote
  - Survey (human research)

== Agriculture ==
- Poll (livestock), the top of an animal's head
- Polled livestock, hornless livestock of normally horned species
- Polling, livestock dehorning

== Arts, entertainment, and media ==
- Poll (band), a Greek pop group of the 1970s
- Poll, the German title for the 2010 film The Poll Diaries

== Mathematics, science, and technology ==
- poll (Unix), a Unix system call
- POLL, DNA polymerase lambda
- Polling (computer science), actively and synchronously sampling an external device's status
- Polling system, a mathematical model where a single server visits a set of queues in some order

== People ==
=== Given name or middle name ===
- Silvia Poll Ahrens (born 1970), Central American swimmer with Olympic medal
- Poll Ashokanand (born 1940), Indian former cricketer
- Poll Shyamsunder (1924–1988), Indian cricketer

=== Surname ===
- Brian Poll (1941–1999), English cricketer
- Claudia Poll (born 1972), Central American swimmer with Olympic gold medal
- George St Poll (died 1550s), an English politician
- Graham Poll (born 1963), British referee
- Heinrich Wilhelm Poll (1877–1939), German anatomist and geneticist
- Jana Franziska Poll (born 1988), German volleyball player
- Jon Poll (born 1958), American film director
- Martin Poll (1922–2012), American film and television producer
- Max Poll (1908–1991), Belgian ichthyologist
- Mihkel Poll (born 1986), Estonian pianist
- Richard D. Poll (1918–1994), American historian, academic, author
- Thomas St Poll (died 1582), member of Parliament
- Kim Polling (born 1991), Dutch judoka

== Places ==
=== Austria ===
- Polling im Innkreis, a municipality in the district of Braunau am Inn in Upper Austria
- Polling in Tirol, a municipality in the district of Innsbruck-Land in Tyrol

=== Germany ===
- Poll, Cologne, a quarter of Cologne, Germany
- Polling, Mühldorf, a municipality in the district of Mühldorf in Bavaria
- Polling, Weilheim-Schongau, a municipality in the district of Weilheim-Schongau in Bavaria

== Other uses ==
- Deed poll, a legal document binding only to a single person or party
- Poll, the part of a claw hammer head containing its driving face
- Poll tax (disambiguation), several related forms of taxation
- Polling (usually spelled "poleing"), standing up with arms to the sides in unusual public spaces; a variant of planking
- Polling or pollarding, cutting the upper part of a tree and allowing it to regrow
- Push poll, an interactive marketing technique or political [mis-]information campaign designed to appear as an opinion poll
- Poll, the pet parrot of Andrew Jackson

== See also ==
- Paul (disambiguation)
- Pohl (disambiguation)
- Pohle (disambiguation)
- Pol (disambiguation)
- Pole (disambiguation)
- Poling (disambiguation)
  - Poling (metallurgy), removing oxides when refining a metal
- Pollard (disambiguation)
- Polly (disambiguation)
