= Polidori =

Polidori is an Italian surname. It originates from the Greek word "Πολύδωρος" (Polydoros), which is a compound of πολύς (polys, "many") + δώρον (doron, "gift"). Notable people with the surname include:

- Alessandro Polidori (born 1992), Italian footballer
- Ambra Polidori (born 1954), Mexican artist
- Enzo Polidori (1936–2021), Italian politician
- Erika Polidori (born 1992), Canadian softball player
- Frances Polidori (1800–1886), daughter of Gaetano
- Gaetano Polidori (1763–1853), Italian writer
- Giancarlo Polidori (born 1943), Italian cyclist
- Gianni Polidori (1923–1992), Italian art director
- Gino Polidori (1941–2014), American politician
- John William Polidori (1795–1821), Italian-English physician and writer, son of Gaetano
- Paolo Polidori (1778–1847), Italian cardinal
- Robert Polidori (born 1951), Canadian photographer

== Other ==
- Polidori Sausage, a food company
- Polidori RLA, a historical name for the now defunct Air Estates Airport

== See also ==
- Polydore (disambiguation)
