= Polarization =

Polarization or polarisation may refer to:

== Mathematics ==
- Polarization of an Abelian variety, in the mathematics of complex manifolds
- Polarization of an algebraic form, a technique for expressing a homogeneous polynomial in a simpler fashion by adjoining more variables
- Polarization identity, expresses an inner product in terms of its associated norm
- Polarization (Lie algebra)

== Physical sciences ==
- Polarization (physics), the ability of waves to oscillate in more than one direction; polarization of light allows the glare-reducing effect of polarized sunglasses
  - Polarization (antenna), the state of polarization (in the above sense) of electromagnetic waves transmitted by or received by a radio antenna
- Dielectric polarization, charge separation in insulating materials:
  - Polarization density, volume dielectric polarization
  - Dipolar polarization, orientation of permanent dipoles
  - Ionic polarization, displacement of ions in a crystal
  - Maxwell–Wagner–Sillars polarization, slow long-distance charge separation in dielectric spectroscopy on inhomogeneous soft matter
- Polarization (electrochemistry), a change in the equilibrium potential of an electrochemical reaction
- Concentration polarization, the shift of the electrochemical potential difference across an electrochemical cell from its equilibrium value
- Spin polarization, the degree by which the spin of elementary particles is aligned to a given direction
- Polarizability, an electrical property of atoms or molecules and a separate magnetic property of subatomic particles
  - Polarization function, a feature of some molecular modelling methods
- Photon polarization, the mathematical link between wave polarization and spin polarization
- Vacuum polarization, a process in which a background electromagnetic field produces virtual electron-positron pairs
- Polarization (cosmology), mechanisms for detecting astronomical polarization and the possible natural origins

== Social sciences ==
- Polarization (economics), faster decrease of moderate-skill jobs relative to low-skill and high-skill jobs
- Political polarization, when public opinion divides and becomes oppositional
  - Bipolarisation, two sides of opposition
- Social polarization, segregation of society into social groups, from high-income to low-income
- Group polarization, tendency of a group to make more extreme decisions than individuals' initial inclinations
  - Attitude polarization, when disagreement becomes more extreme as different parties consider evidence
- Racial polarization, when a population with varying ancestry is divided into distinct racial groups

== Others ==
- Polarization (album), an album by American jazz trombonist and composer Julian Priester
- Polarization, in many disciplines, is a tendency to be located close to one of the opposite ends of a continuum

== See also ==
- Polar (disambiguation)
- Polar opposite (disambiguation)
- Polarity (disambiguation)
- Pole (disambiguation)
- Reversal (disambiguation)
- Depolarization (disambiguation)
