= Pahlmann =

Pahlmann is a surname. Notable people with the surname include:

- Ingrid Pahlmann (born 1957), German politician
- William Pahlmann (1900–1987), American interior designer

== See also ==
- Pohlmann
