= Von Pohl =

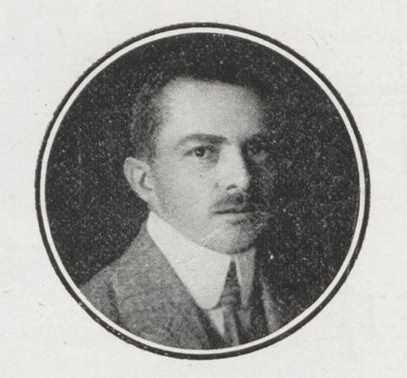
Gustav Freiherr von Pohl

The Von Pohl is the name of the briefadel family, part of the recent German nobility.

== Notable members ==
- Hugo von Pohl (1855–1916), German admiral
- Maximilian Ritter von Pohl (1893–1951), German army and air force (Luftwaffe) officer

== See also ==
- Pohl
- Pöhl
- Pohlman
