= Adolf Engler =

German botanist (1844–1930) noted for taxonomy

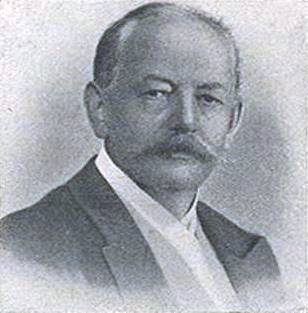
- Born: Heinrich Gustav Adolf Engler; 25 March 1844; Sagan, Prussia (now Żagań, Poland)
- Died: 10 October 1930 (aged 86); Berlin, Germany
- Education: University of Breslau
- Known for: Die Natürlichen Pflanzenfamilien
- Awards: Linnean Medal (1913)
- Scientific career
- Fields: Botany, plant taxonomy
- Workplaces: Botanical Institute of Munich; Kiel University; Friedrich Wilhelm University of Berlin
- Author abbrev. (botany): Engl.

Heinrich Gustav Adolf Engler (25 March 1844 – 10 October 1930) was a German botanist. He worked on plant taxonomy and phytogeography, such as Die natürlichen Pflanzenfamilien (The Natural Plant Families), edited with Karl A. E. von Prantl. His system of plant classification, the Engler system, is still used by many herbaria and is followed by writers of many manuals and floras. It is still the only system that treats all 'plants' (in the wider sense, algae to flowering plants) in such depth.

Engler published a prodigious number of taxonomic works. He used various artists to illustrate his books, notably Joseph Pohl (1864–1939), an illustrator who had served an apprenticeship as a wood-engraver. Pohl's skill drew Engler's attention, starting a collaboration of some 40 years. Pohl produced more than 33 000 drawings in 6 000 plates for Die naturlichen Pflanzenfamilien. He also illustrated Das Pflanzenreich (1900–1953), Die Pflanzenwelt Afrikas (1908–1910), Monographien afrikanischer Pflanzenfamilien (1898–1904) and the journals Engler's botanische Jahrbücher.

== Biography ==
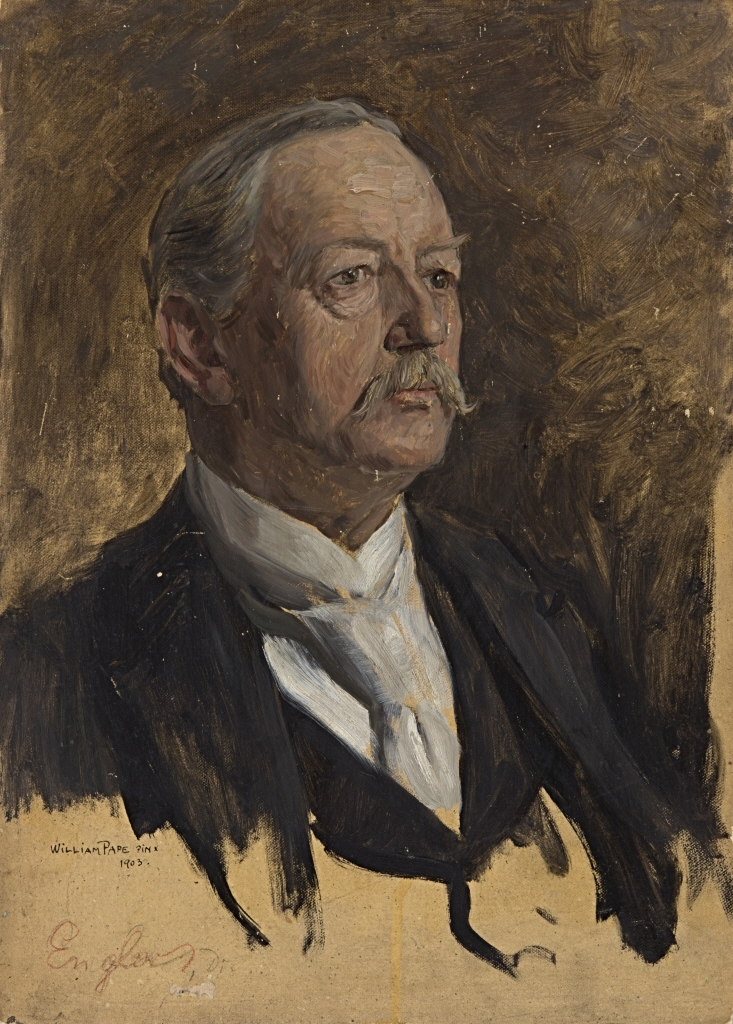
Portrait of Engler, by William Pape, 1903

Adolf Engler was born on March 25, 1844, in Sagan, Silesia, now Żagań, in western Poland as Heinrich Gustav Adolf Engler, and died in Berlin, Germany, on October 10, 1930.

He studied and obtained a PhD from the University of Breslau (now Wrocław, Poland) in 1866. After some years of teaching, he became, in 1871, custodian of botanical collections of the Botanisches Institut der Ludwig-Maximilians-Universität München (Botanical Institute of Munich), remaining there until 1878, when he accepted a professorship at the University of Kiel, where he stayed until 1884, teaching systematic botany. Also in 1878, Engler was elected into Leopoldina, German Academy of Natural History. He went back to Breslau in 1884, as director of the Botanical Garden, succeeding Goeppert, and appointed professor of botany at the University of Breslau. From 1889 to 1921, Engler was a professor at the Friedrich Wilhelm University of Berlin, and director of the Berlin-Dahlem Botanical Garden, transforming it into one of the greatest botanical gardens of the world.

He visited several regions of the world, enlarging the knowledge of floristic distribution, especially of Africa.

== Works ==
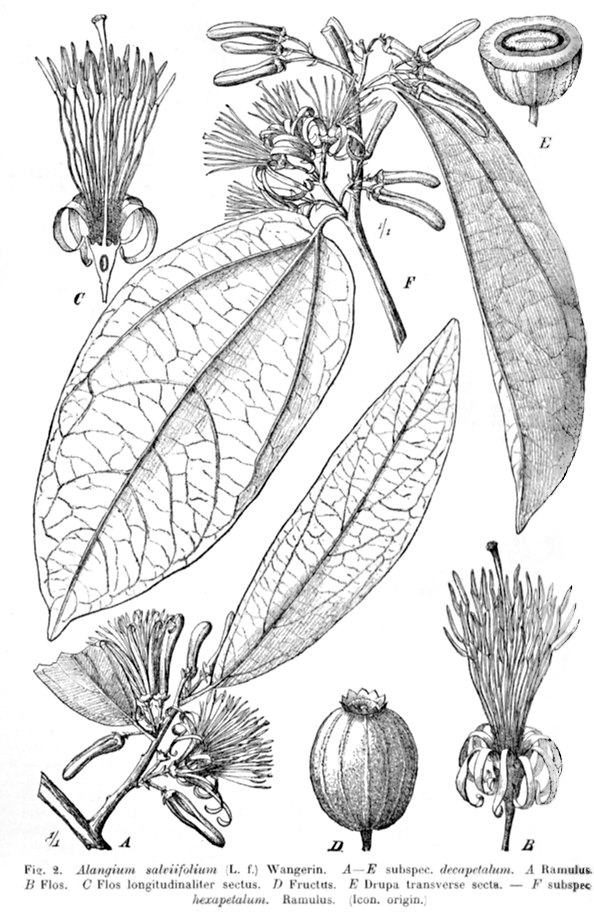
Alangium salviifolium plate from Das Pflanzenreich

=== Plant taxonomy ===
Besides his important work in general plant taxonomy, he was also an expert in some taxa, such as Saxifraga, Araceae, Burseraceae, and others. Engler edited the exsiccata Araceae exsiccatae et illustratae.

Adolf Engler collaborated with several other great botanists, including Alphonse de Candolle on the Monographiae Phanerogamarum (Monographs of Flowering Plants), and C.F.P. von Martius on the monumental work Flora Brasiliensis (Flora of Brazil).

He founded the journal Botanische Jahrbücher für Systematik, Pflanzengeschichte und Pflanzengeographie (Botanical Yearbook for Systematics, Plant Phylogeny and Phytogeography, ISSN 0006-8152), published in Leipzig, Germany, which has continued in publication from 1881 to the present. In 2010, this publication changed its name to Plant Diversity and Evolution: Phylogeny, Biogeography, Structure and Function, ISSN 1869-6155.

- Die Natürlichen Pflanzenfamilien (The Natural Plant Families), edited with Karl A. E. Prantl, with the collaboration of many notable experts, 1887–1915, 23 volumes: This enormous series is one of the very few detailed works (since Linnaeus) to attempt the classification of plants from algae to flowering plants, and constitutes an invaluable work. A second, incomplete edition was produced (1924–1980) in 28 parts by Duncker und Humblot Verlag, Berlin). Some volumes have been re-issued in English. The second edition was hard to use for many years because no part of it was indexed until 1984, when an index was published in the Annals of the Missouri Botanical Garden.
- Das Pflanzenreich (The Plant Kingdom), with the collaboration of many notable experts, 1900–1968: This monographic series on the plant kingdom is presently incomplete.
- Syllabus der Pflanzenfamilien, first published in 1892. The 12th edition, edited by H. Melchior & E. Werdermann, with the collaboration of many notable experts, was published between 1954 and 1964. This is the most recent summary of the Engler system and gives descriptions of the higher taxonomic levels, in two volumes.

=== Phytogeography ===
He was one of the pioneers in this field of science, highlighting the importance of factors such as geology on biodiversity, and defined biogeographical regions in 1879.

- Vegetation der Erde (Vegetation of the Earth), 1896, with O. Drude
- Die Pflanzenwelt Ost-Afrikas und der Nachbargebiete (The Plant World of Eastern Africa and the Adjacent Regions), 1895 (available at Biodiversity Heritage Library)

== Recognition ==
He received the Linnean Medal in 1913. The International Association for Plant Taxonomy established the Engler Medal in his honour in 1986, to be awarded for outstanding contributions to plant taxonomy.

Engler was elected an International Member of the American Philosophical Society in 1906. He was elected a foreign member of the Royal Netherlands Academy of Arts and Sciences in 1920. In 1925, he was elected an International Member of the United States National Academy of Science.

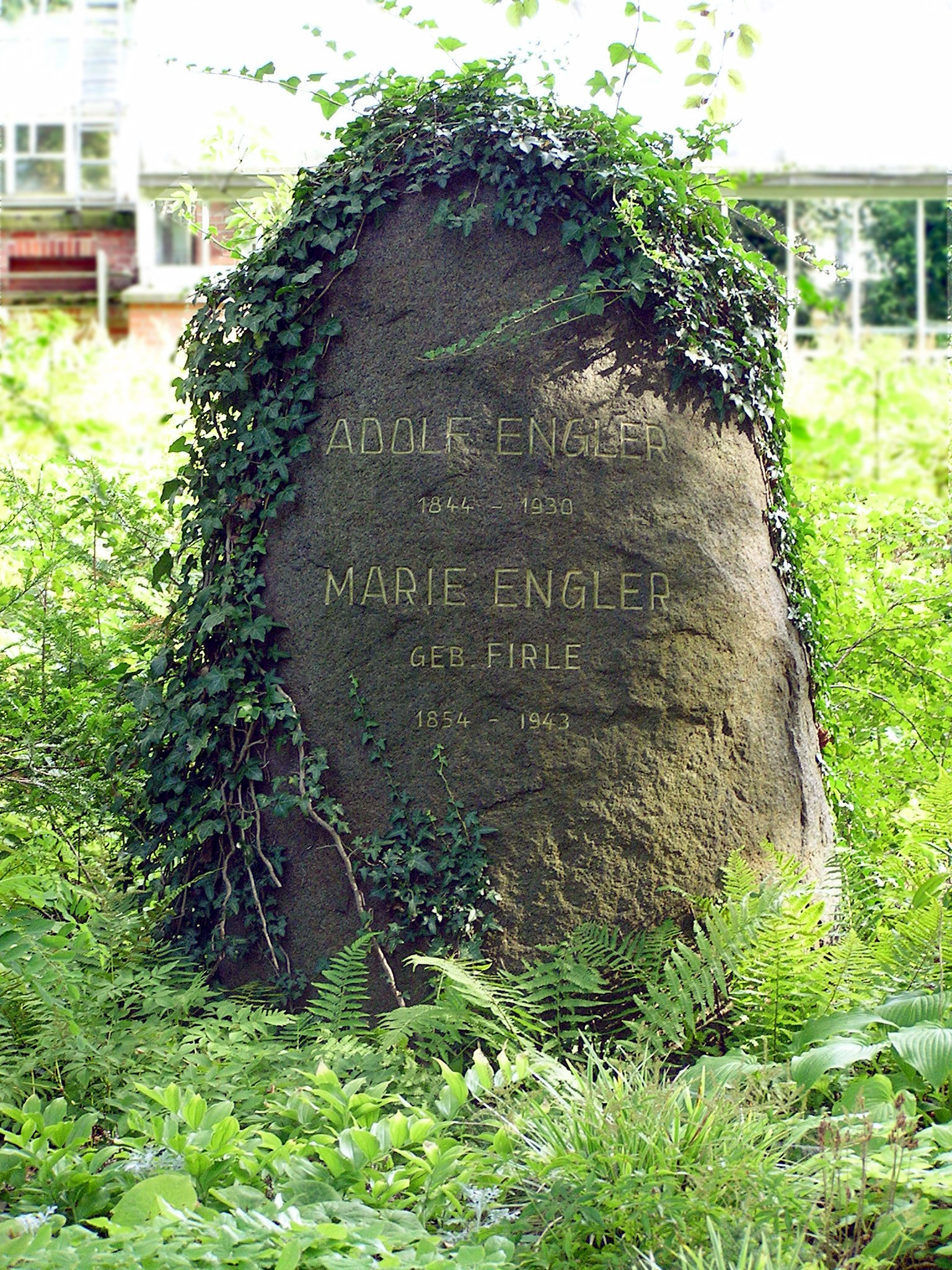
Engler's grave marker at the Berlin Botanical Garden

The journal Englera (ISSN 0170-4818) published by the Berlin-Dahlem Botanical Garden, Germany, is also named after him. Many genera (in various 'plant' groups) are named in his honour, such as Englerarum, Englerastrum (now a synonym of Coleus), Englerella (now a synonym of Pouteria Aubl.), Engleria, Englerina, Englerocharis, Englerodaphne, Englerodendron and Englerophytum. He is also honoured with Engleromyces, and Englerodothis (2 genera of fungi).

Engler is commemorated in the specific epithet adolphi.

== See also ==
- Engler system
- List of plants of Caatinga vegetation of Brazil
- List of plants of Cerrado vegetation of Brazil
- Phylogenetic system

== Bibliography ==
=== Works by Engler ===
- Engler, Adolf (1886). Führer durch den Königlich botanischen Garten der Universität zu Breslau. J.U. Kerns Verlag (Max Müller).
- Engler, Adolf; Prantl, Karl, eds. (1887–1915). Die Natürlichen Pflanzenfamilien nebst ihren Gattungen und wichtigeren Arten, insbesondere den Nutzpflanzen, unter Mitwirkung zahlreicher hervorragender Fachgelehrten. Leipzig: W. Engelmann.
- Engler, Adolf, ed. (1900–1968). Das Pflanzenreich: regni vegetablilis conspectus. Leipzig: W. Engelmann. (Published as a series of volumes or fascicles "Hefte" each containing one or more monographs. Each monograph has separate paging and index. The volumes are numbered in sequence of publication. The systematic sequence of the families is indicated on the cover page e.g. 225: Halorrhagaceae 1905 Hefte IV vol. 23), or
  - Schindler, A.K. (1905). "Halorrhagaceae". In Engler, Adolf (ed.). Das Pflanzenreich: regni vegetablilis conspectus (in Latin and German). Vol. 23. Leipzig: W. Engelmann.
- Engler, Adolf, ed. (1903). Syllabus der Pflanzenfamilien: eine Übersicht über das gesamte Pflanzensystem mit Berücksichtigung der Medicinal- und Nutzpflanzen nebst einer Übersicht über die Florenreiche und Florengebiete der Erde zum Gebrauch bei Vorlesungen und Studien über specielle und medicinisch-pharmaceutische Botanik (3rd ed.). Berlin: Borntraeger.

=== Works about Engler ===
- Lack, Hans Walter (2000). Botanisches Museum Berlin: Adolf Engler—Die Welt in einem Garten (The world in a garden) (in German). München, Germany: Prestel. ISBN 3-7913-2315-6.
- Stace, Clive A. (1989) [1980]. Plant taxonomy and biosystematics (2nd. ed.). Cambridge: Cambridge University Press. ISBN 978-0-521-42785-2.
- Morley, Thomas (1984). "An Index to the Families in Engler and Prantl's "Die Naturlichen Pflanzenfamilien'". Annals of the Missouri Botanical Garden. 71 (1): 210–228. doi:10.2307/2399064. JSTOR 2399064.
- Davis, Mervyn T. (August 1957). "A guide and an analysis of Engler's "Das Pflanzenreich"". Taxon. 6 (6): 161–182. Bibcode:1957Taxon...6..161D. doi:10.2307/1217029. JSTOR 1217029.
- Frans A. Stafleu. "Engler, Heinrich Gustav Adolf." Complete Dictionary of Scientific Biography. 2008.
- Frans A. Stafleu. An Engler episode. Occasional Papers of the Farlow Herbarium of Cryptogamic Botany No. 16, A Volume in Honor of Geneva Sayre on the Occasion of her 70th Birthday (June, 1981), pp. 147-151
- Adolf Heinrich Gustav Engler, Botaniker. Berlin 2002 Archived 2017-01-19 at the Wayback Machine

=== Websites ===
- IAPT (2016). "Awards presented by IAPT". Archived from the original on 2016-12-20.
