= Pole =

Pole or poles may refer to:

== People ==
- Polish people, people from the country of Poland
- Pole (surname), including a list of people with the name
- Pole (musician) (Stefan Betke, born 1967), German electronic music artist
- Spot Poles (Spottswood Poles, 1887–1962), American baseball player
- Pole Atanraoi-Reim (fl. from 1992), a Kiribati lawyer
- Pole baronets, three titles in the UK

== Astronomy and geography ==
- Poles of astronomical bodies
  - Celestial pole, two points where the axis of rotation intersects the celestial sphere
  - Orbital pole, two points at the end of the orbital normal
  - North magnetic pole of Earth
  - South magnetic pole of Earth
- Pole star, a visible star approximately aligned with a celestial pole
- Geographical pole, two points on Earth where its axis of rotation intersects its surface
  - North Pole
  - South Pole

== Arts and entertainment ==
- Pole (musician), German electronic music artist
  - Pole (album), by Pole, 2003
- Pole (Stockhausen), a 1970 composition by Karlheinz Stockhausen
- The Poles (band), a Canadian punk rock band
- Pole, a character in the game Yie Ar Kung-Fu
- Jill Pole, a character in C. S. Lewis's Chronicles of Narnia series

== Places ==
- Pole, Lubusz Voivodeship, Poland
- Pole, Botswana
- Poles, former name of Hanbury Manor, Ware, England
- Poles, a place in Highland council area, Scotland
- Poles, former name of Hanbury Manor, Ware, England

== Science and technology ==
- Pole, or terminal (electronics)
- Pole, in contact terminology of a switch
- Pole (unit of length), or perch or rod, a unit of length of various historical definitions
- Pole, either end of a magnet
- Pole (complex analysis), a certain type of mathematical singularity
- Pole, an element of perspective (geometry)
- Pole and polar, in geometry
- Prospective Outlook on Long-term Energy Systems (POLES), a world simulation model for the energy sector
- POLE (gene), in humans
- A component found in electric motors

== Objects ==
- Pole, a kind of stick or rod (disambiguation)
- Chinese pole, a vertical pole used for acrobatics
- Flagpole
- Qutb, Sufi spiritual leader
- Pole vault

== See also ==
- Axle
- Polar (disambiguation)
- Polarity (disambiguation)
- Polarization (disambiguation)
- Pole position (disambiguation)
- Pohl (disambiguation)
- Pohle (disambiguation)
- Pol (disambiguation)
- Poll (disambiguation)
