= Pirata (graphic novel) =

- First edition cover of Polgas:Ang Asong Hindi featuring Pirata
- Main characters: Polgas aka. Dobermaxx; Khalid
- Series: Polgas:Ang Asong Hindi
- Publisher: Pugad Baboy, Inc.

Creative team
- Writers: Pol Medina, Jr.
- Artists: Pol Medina, Jr.
- Pencillers: Pol Medina, Jr.
- Colorists: Pol Medina, Jr.

Original publication
- Published in: 1995
- Language: Filipino

Polgas and Khalid on the cover of a Pirata reprint.

Pirata (Filipino, Spanish and Portuguese for "pirate") is a full-color graphic novel written and illustrated by Filipino cartoonist Pol Medina, Jr. and first published in 1995 by Pugad Baboy, Inc. The characters and storyline of Pirata are derived from Medina's comic strip Pugad Baboy, which is published in the Philippine Daily Inquirer and is compiled annually in book form.

Unlike the book compilations of comic strips that had appeared beforehand in the Philippine Daily Inquirer, Pirata contains original, never-before published material. Medina began working on the graphic novel in February 1994, announcing its creation in PB5, the fifth Pugad Baboy compilation, as the first of a series of comics called "The Adventures of Polgas - Ang Asong Hindi" (The Dog Who Isn't) with the supposed publishing date of May 1994. However, it took slightly over a year to complete it, instead of the two months estimated. Priced a moderate Php 85.00 in 1995 (about US$ 3.27 in 1995), it is 42 pages of a Pugad Baboy adventure centered on Polgas' acquaintance and friendship with a Muslim pirate named Khalid.

Pirata has a more serious atmosphere compared to Medina's previous work, both in terms of theme and materials used—all pages of the first edition were printed on glossy paper, a practice not very common for comics printed in the Philippines at that time. It has been reprinted since.

In the tenth Pugad Baboy compilation, Pugad Baboy X, Medina admitted that during the time he was making Pirata, he was dealing with a lot of personal issues. Pirata's serious tone, he related, was a reflection of his angst due to these crises.

== Synopsis ==
Khalid, a repentant pirate, is rescued by the Pugad Baboy residents after he is nearly killed by his erstwhile brothers-in-arms in the Red Marlin Group under the command of Luna, who are under the impression that he is responsible to the death of their leader Hamid Mustafa. Polgas saves his life several times as a Red Marlin hit squad attempts to finish the job. As rogue elements of the Navy and the Red Marlin finally catch up with Khalid and take him, Doc Sebo, Tomas and Dagul captive, Polgas dons his Dobermaxx persona and rescues the group which had been taken on board a ship in North Harbor. Khalid in turn saves Dobermaxx's life as Luna was about to shoot him from behind. It is soon revealed that Luna himself murdered Hamid; the Red Marlin take him with them as Khalid allows them to escape. The rogue Navy elements are taken into custody by the authorities.

Khalid is later accepted as the Red Marlin's new leader. He plans to surrender the pirate group to authorities and will soon testify during the court martial of Major Velasquez, the rogue Navy group's commander.

== Subplot on Polgas' origin ==
A relevant subplot in Pirata relates the origin of Polgas' human-like behavior, especially his ability to speak. It is revealed that his mother was a pure-bred Golden Retriever named Cecilia owned by a rich customs inspector named Lupito C. Nakpil, otherwise known as "King Louie". This man was so well-off that Cecilia had a diamond-studded collar and three golden earrings. Cecilia had a mongrel for a mate and when she gave birth to six puppies(four males and two females) all of whom resembled their sire, Nakpil was furious. Polgas' father soon disappeared and that evening, Nakpil's men served asocena as pulutan. Polgas and his siblings were separated from their mother and Nakpil left home for his resthouse in Tagaytay, taking Cecilia with him. Her forced removal from the presence of her offspring caused one of her golden earrings to fall off, of which Polgas retrieved.

=== Dagul and Polgas meet ===
The puppies soon went their separate ways and Polgas grew so desperate that he decided to commit suicide. Lying down in the middle of a road, he waited for a vehicle to run him over. One of the vehicles stopped and the driver, Dagul, took Polgas home with him. He was cleaned up and fed, but would not eat. After a week of no food intake, Dagul took him to a veterinarian, who injected Polgas with a sedative and put him under intravenous therapy. The vet also discovered the golden earring in Polgas' mouth. Dagul had Polgas' left earlobe pierced and had him wear the earring. Polgas grew to trust his master, Dagul, who named him "Polgas"; from Dagul's grandfather's name "Apolonio" and "pulgas", the Spanish-derived Filipino word for "flea".

=== Origin of Polgas' speech abilities ===
Dagul worked as a chef and was fond of cooking exotic dishes. One of Polgas' favorites was a bibingka topped with chicken skin cracklings, feta cheese, century egg and balut chicks. This concoction had a teratogenic effect upon him, triggered by the radiation coming off his master's television set. The physical changes in Polgas included the ability to talk and imitate his master's behavior, causing him over time to evolve into a more human-like being. Tomas, Dagul's neighbor, soon noticed Polgas' special abilities and with funding from an unknown philanthropist, the "special intelligence unit" known as the Organized Canine Bureau was established with Polgas, initially codenamed "Wisedog" as its first operative. His first mission was to go undercover and take down the "Dognap King" Atong Damuho as related in the story arc Wisedog.

=== Nakpil gets his comeuppance ===
Polgas has not forgotten "King Louie" however; in his spare time he would do research on Lupito Nakpil's whereabouts. He went looking for Nakpil at his Tagaytay resthouse, but did not find him there. He had reportedly gone into hiding in Zamboanga after the 1986 EDSA Revolution when the new administration began investigating his unexplained wealth. Polgas assumed that Nakpil had taken his mother with him. It soon became obvious that Nakpil had abandoned Cecilia in Tagaytay; as Polgas passed by a market, he saw several drug addicts beating an old, dirty dog. After dispatching the addicts, Polgas saw two gold earrings on the dog's right ear. It was indeed Cecilia; his mother recognized him and licked his nose one last time before she died.

As the Red Marlin Group takes Khalid and the others captive, Polgas recognizes Luna for who he really is—Lupito Nakpil. He later exacts some measure of revenge as he repeatedly shoots Luna pointblank in the face with his garapata gun. Luna was taken by the Red Marlin when it was revealed that he murdered Hamid. It is assumed that he was given a pirate's execution at sea by the group.

== Miscellaneous notes ==
- Polgas' mother Cecilia's name is an homage to Pol Medina, Jr.'s own mother Cecilia, further evidence that the cartoonist treats Polgas as an alter ego.
- A speech balloon meant for Khalid on the tenth frame of page 39 in the first edition of Pirata has no words in it; it may be a typographical error.
- Medina misspelled the word "yacht" in the graphic novel twice as "yatch" (sic).
- Khalid claims Major Velazquez is a commander in the Philippine Navy. However, Majors are Army ranks, and their Navy counterparts are Lieutenant Commanders.
- In the first edition of Pirata, a two-page readers' corner can be found between pages 15 and 16 wherein Medina answered readers' comments about Pugad Baboy. It was included because the graphic novel was supposed to be the first of a quarterly comic series. Later editions of Pirata omitted this.
