= Pole position (disambiguation) =

Pole position is a racing term identifying a starting position at the front of the grid.

Pole Position may also refer to:

- Pole Position, a 1982 motor-racing video game
- Pole Position II, the 1983 sequel to the 1982 video game
- Pole Position (board game), a board game published in 1989 by Piatnik
- Pole Position (TV series), a 1984 animated cartoon series
- Elegant Machinery or Pole Position, a Swedish synthpop band formed in 1988
