= Pohle (disambiguation) =

Pohle is a municipality in Lower Saxony, Germany.

Pohle is also the name of:

- Andreas Pohle (born 1981), German athlete
- Christian Nikolai Richard Pohle (1869–1926), German botanist
- David Pohle (1624–1695), German composer

== See also ==
- Pohl (disambiguation)
- Pole (disambiguation)
- Poll (disambiguation)
- Pohle's fruit bat, an African megabat
