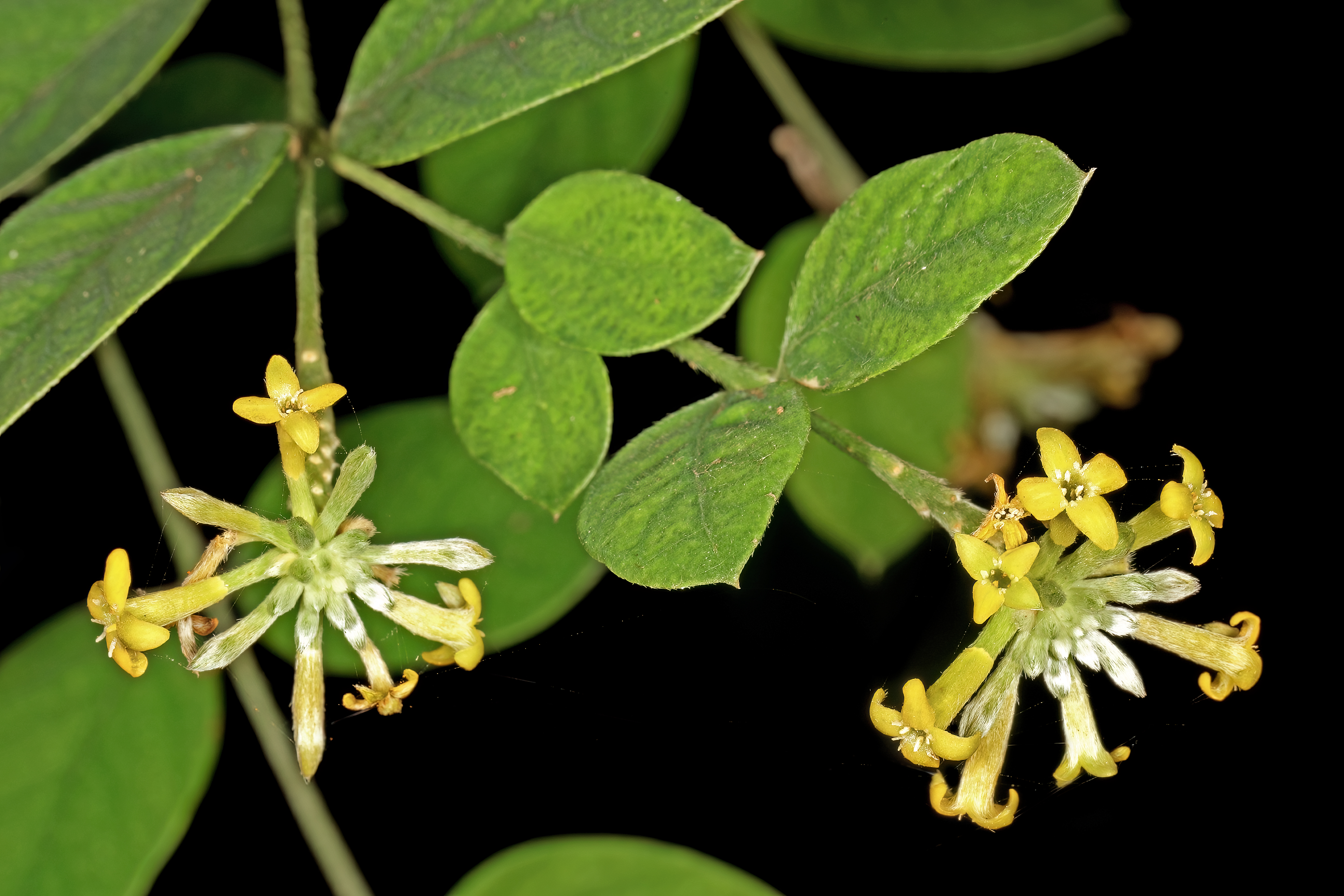
- Englerodaphne ovalifolia

Scientific classification
- Kingdom: Plantae
- Clade: Tracheophytes
- Clade: Angiosperms
- Clade: Eudicots
- Clade: Rosids
- Order: Malvales
- Family: Thymelaeaceae
- Genus: Englerodaphne; Gilg (1894)

= Englerodaphne =

Genus of plants

Englerodaphne is a genus of flowering plants belonging to the family Thymelaeaceae.

Its native range is from southern Sudan to southern Africa; it is found in Cape Provinces, KwaZulu-Natal and Northern Provinces (of South Africa), Kenya, Sudan, Tanzania and Uganda.

The genus name of Englerodaphne is in honour of Adolf Engler (1844–1930), a German botanist, and also daphne, a genus of evergreen shrubs in the family Thymelaeaceae. It was first published and described in Bot. Jahrb. Syst. Vol.19 on page 274 in 1894.

Species known:

- Englerodaphne ovalifolia (Meisn.) E.Phillips
- Englerodaphne pilosa Burtt Davy
- Englerodaphne subcordata (Meisn.) Engl.
