= Pugad Baboy =

Comic strip by Pol Medina Jr.

- Cover of Katorse (2002), the 14th compilation of Pugad Baboy, which features all major characters of the comic strip series.
- Author: Pol Medina, Jr.
- Website: rappler.com/pugad-baboy
- Current status/schedule: On hiatus due to author's health reason.
- Launch date: May 18, 1988 (PDI); June 17, 2013 (Rappler); March 5, 2018 (Philippine Star)
- End date: June 4, 2013 (PDI); March 1, 2018 (Rappler); March 9, 2019 (Philippine Star)
- Publisher(s): Philippine Daily Inquirer (formerly), The Philippine Star (formerly)
- Genre(s): Humor, political satire

Pugad Baboy (literally, "swine's nest" in Tagalog) is a comic strip created by Filipino cartoonist Apolonio "Pol" Medina, Jr. The strip is about a Manila community of mostly obese people – "fat as pigs" (baboy is Tagalog for pig).

It started appearing in the Philippine Daily Inquirer on May 18, 1988, and was published exclusively in the Inquirer line of newspapers (Broadsheet Inquirer and its free concise sister tabloid called Inquirer Libre and tabloids Bandera and Tumbok.) Its popularity has spawned numerous compilations, a live-action television series, and merchandise such as T-shirts and figurines.

The strip not only showcases domestic life; occasionally, it features adventure, drama, and pure spoof sequences. More often, the strip mirrors the general sentiment of the Filipino people on relevant topics such as corruption in the government as well as Filipino pop culture. In this respect, the strip has been likened to Garry Trudeau's Doonesbury. Sometimes, political satire is woven into some ordinary strips and adventure stories.

== History ==
September 2006: Dagul mentions Wikipedia in the third panel from Pugad Baboy nineteen. An English approximation of his dialog would be: "Ragnarok has replaced patintero (a traditional game), video conferencing has replaced lunch meetings, and Google and Wikipedia have replaced the library!"

Medina conceived the strip while working under contract in Iraq in 1986. On May 18, 1988, he pitched his strips to the Philippine Daily Inquirer. His strip, named after a friend's piggery in Bulacan, was accepted on the spot.

Medina originally spelled "Pugad-Baboy" with a hyphen in the strip itself, though not in the title.

For many years, the strip was exclusively a black-and-white daily. A full-color Sunday strip in the same paper debuted on October 3, 2004. The full-colored strips ended their run sometime in 2009. Before the tabloid Inquirer Libre debuted, the strip appeared exclusively in the Inquirer broadsheet.

In a strip published in September 2006, Medina commented on online life substituting for physical contact. He mentioned Wikipedia as one of the alternatives to library visits, the other being Google.

The Inquirer decided to discontinue carrying Pugad Baboy in its comics section beginning June 5, 2013, after a strip for the June 4 edition reportedly lambasted hypocrisy among Christians against homosexuals when certain sectarian schools condone such students among their ranks. The newspaper later clarified that the cartoonist was not actually fired and the strip would just be suspended from publication until an internal investigation had been carried out. However, Medina officially resigned from the paper on June 7, 2013. Online news website Rappler later hired him, with the strip being published as a webcomic on the site starting June 17, 2013. The new version offers readers alternative punchlines with the respective voting options.

Its final strip on Rappler, depicting a portal, appeared on March 1, 2018. The strip returned to print media with its first appearance in the Philippine Star and its sister publications, Pilipino Star Ngayon and Pang-Masa, on March 5, 2018.

== Characters ==
=== The Sungcals ===
The Sungcal family reflects aspects of traditional and stereotypical families, with a housewife and an overseas contract worker as members, with a domestic helper to supplement. "Sungkal" is a Tagalog word for the term "digging a hole with a (pig's) snout".

- Dagul (Adagulfo Sungcal Jr.), often referred to with the title Mang (Mister) – i.e. Mang Dagul – The patriarch of the family. He works as a chef in a five-star hotel where he specializes in unorthodox dishes. He is often shown at home, usually voicing out on the state of affairs in the Philippines. He is also highly xenophobic. Over the years, he studies different martial arts like karate, arnis and aikido (like Medina), and he also dabbles in tennis and golf. He calls his wife "Honeycured." "Dagul" is Filipino slang for someone or something big. At the end of The Returnee story arc, the Tangaras lend Dagul money so he can quit his job and start his own small restaurant in his house's front yard.
- Debbie (Debra Anne Sungcal) – The matriarch of the family, a loving traditional housewife and mother. Her recurring traits include a love for bargain shopping, indecision regarding actual purchases (sometimes on purpose), and complaining about decisions she lets Dagul make (much to Dagul's annoyance and regret). Also, she extremely highly dislikes any honest opinion Dagul gives her about her figure and/or clothes she wears or tries on – to the point of throwing him out of the house, despite her demanding honest opinions in the first place. She is also the constant victim of disgusting table conversations between her husband, Polgas and sometimes with Utoy. She calls her husband "Sweet Ham."
- Kules (Hercules Sungcal) – The eldest son, a building engineer in Saudi Arabia. When not working, he reads letters from pen pals, goes on blind dates (usually with funny consequences), hangs out with his friend 'Adre (short for compadre; see below), or thinks about the events back in the Philippines. Much like Kules, Medina was formerly a contract worker in Saudi Arabia. The origin of his name is often mistaken to be that of the legendary Greek hero of the same name, when in fact, he is named after the Lockheed C-130 Hercules aircraft. After marrying Mandana, Kules resigned from his overseas job and returned to Pugad Baboy for good, sporting longer hair.
- Tiny (Cristina Sungcal) – The teenage daughter. Her name is not only an obvious misnomer, but also a testament to her vanity and denial regarding her size. She asserts herself as sexy and repeatedly insists that her waistline is 28 inches (the last time this was true was when she was 9 or 10 years old). She does commit herself to diets that often end in failure. Her cooking leaves much to be desired by her family, and is sometimes inedible (in one strip, she naively uses papaya soap in place of the fruit). She studies in the University of Santo Tomas, where Medina graduated in 1983 with a degree in architecture. There, she takes up mass communication, a course the university does not actually offer. She is currently being courted by Brando, whose name is always mistaken by Bab and Dagul, and Tiny correcting them all the time. But in the beginning she allowed herself to be courted by Bab, and this happened only for a short period of time. She also is a cosplaying enthusiast.
- Utoy (Adagulfo Sungcal III) – The youngest son. Intelligent and musically talented (playing the saxophone), he behaves much like other children his age. Medina initially depicted him as a clueless infant, but he later aged him to about eight years old probably to give a child's insight on current events (eight is also the age of most of the child characters in this strip). Despite his youth, he claims Jolen as his girlfriend. In a "Boy Scout" story arc, Medina gives him an absurdly versatile Swiss Army Knife (apart from the usual tools, his knife comes equipped with such things as a refrigerator, a Nintendo video game console complete with television, and an all-terrain vehicle). The tool returns in Pugad Baboy 25 with a mini-sniper rifle that fires foam pellets.
- Mandana (Mandana Ahmadi-Sungcal) – Kules' wife, and a spy of Iranian origin. Known as the "most hated by the Muslims who give Islam a bad name," Mandana amassed a huge amount of fortune from collecting bounties of famous terrorists. Among her modus operandi is to convince wives of terrorists to betray them and become her informant. How and when she fell in love with Kules is unknown, but she ordered her partner Amir to offer Kules dowries to marry her. When a group of Islamists kidnapped Kules and ordered Mandana to bomb the US Embassy in exchange for her fiancé's life, she did not hesitate and obliged. She was assumed killed in action - Kules shot her to save the embassy, though the boat she was piloting still destroyed it. However, it was later revealed that she faked her death in order to deceive the Muslim extremists on her trail, and that what Kules shot was a dummy. It was heavily implied that non-terrorist casualties in the embassy destruction were faked also in order to throw off the Muslim extremists. She re-emerged and reunited with Kules after five years, marrying in a civil ceremony in Tagaytay. She can finally speak Tagalog fluently, as seen in the March 21, 2016, strip here and as of January 25, 2018 here, she's pregnant with her and Kules' first child. She gave birth to a girl, while Kules was away.
- Zara (Lazara Armaiti Sungcal) – Kules and Mandana's infant daughter. She took a lot from her Iranian heritage and her mother's temperament. She never once cried since her birth, something that Mandana claimed she got from her while admitting that her first time crying was when she shot her father who forcefully arranged her to marry an old man.

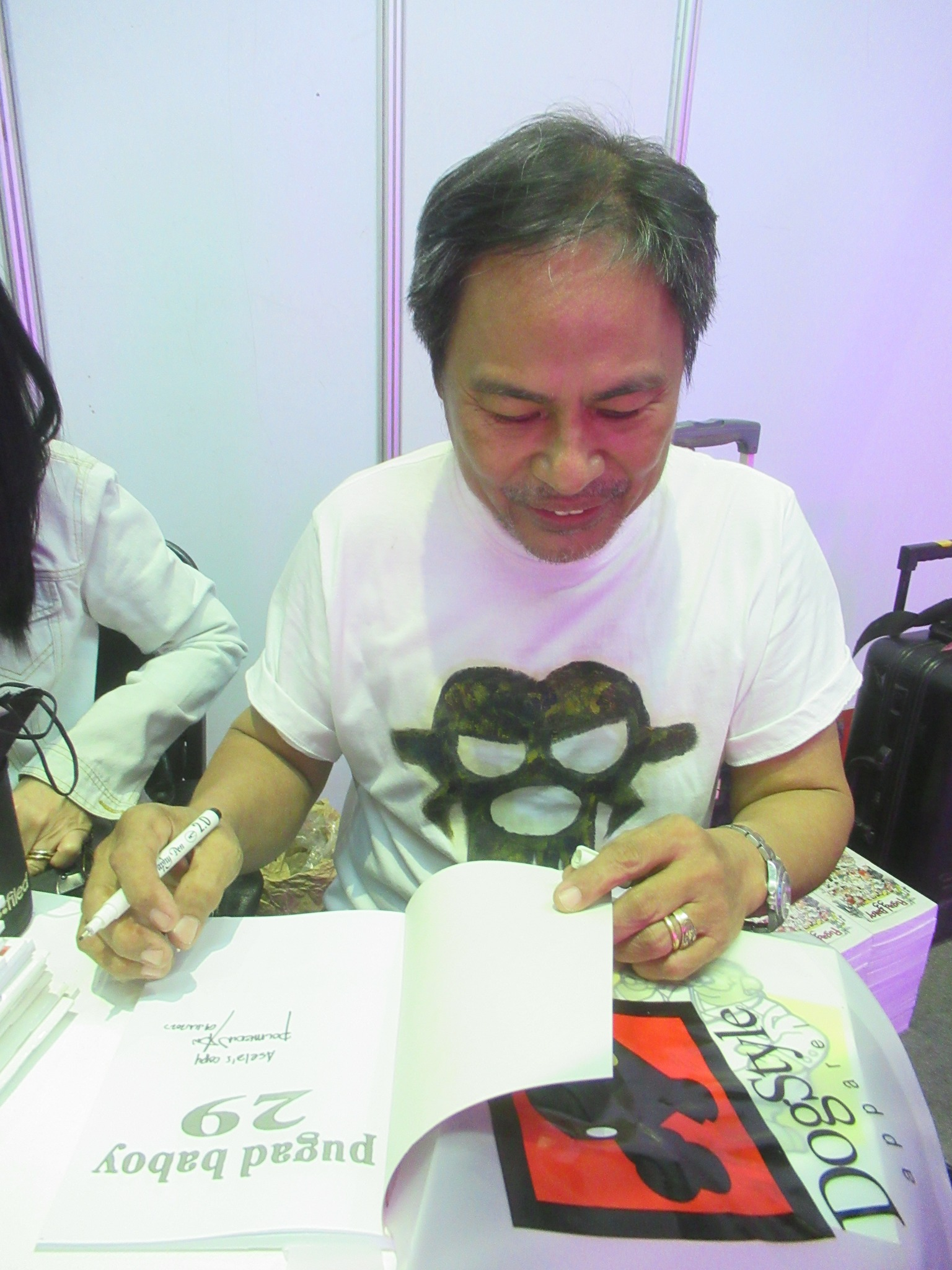
Book signing of Pugad Baboy

==== Polgas ====
Polgas (derived from the Spanish and Tagalog pulgas for "flea") is the Sungcals' anthropomorphic family dog. Notable for his human characteristics such as speech, optional bipedalism, use of clothing and general behavior, he is called ang asong hindi (the dog who isn't) in material outside the strip proper because of his human characteristics. He acts as an extra member of the Sungcals and is his master Dagul's drinking buddy. However, he still behaves like a typical dog when he chooses to, though usually when he takes a bite out of people or leaks on them, most often Dagul.

Polgas was initially a normal dog which walked on all fours, albeit one who wore shirts and undershirts like Dagul. Medina eventually gave him the ability to talk, followed by other human characteristics like a more humanlike physique. Originally, Brosia, a former ventriloquist, supplied Polgas's voice, but Medina was so dissatisfied with the idea that he abandoned it completely. Medina later explained in a 1995 spin-off graphic novel entitled Pirata that Polgas developed human characteristics due to his master's exotic version of bibingka (rice cake) and exposure to radiation emitted by television sets. Apparently, the combination had a teratogenic effect on him, somewhat similar to the mutation of the Teenage Mutant Ninja Turtles.

Medina eventually developed the character into a "man (dog) of action", humorously saving the human characters from danger during story arcs, and later a full-fledged action hero involved with more serious activities. Polgas became a deep penetration agent of a fictional military division called the Organized Canine Bureau (OCB). This organization spoofs the TV series Wiseguy, which features a fictional branch of the FBI called the Organized Crime Bureau, responsible for the protagonist Vinnie Terranova's activities.

Medina's OCB was originally formed to combat the pilfering of stray dogs being sold in Metro Manila for their meat. Wisedog's second mission took place in Baguio, where the selling and eating of dog meat is an illegal industry. (See The Baguio Connection). Polgas's original call sign in the OCB was Wisedog (a homage to Wiseguy). Later, he changed his call sign to Dobermaxx after he and some other residents of Pugad Baboy were accidentally sent to and returned from the year 2078. Subsequently, he is sometimes referred to as "Agent Delta" or simply "Delta".

As an agent, Polgas was issued with a prototype garapata (tick) gun, which shoots droplets of tick sweat that causes itching that lasts for six months. Later, he was issued a tiny surveillance robot flea named "Gary" and ballistic arnis sticks. After his first mission, he was issued a customized Porsche 959, the Thunderdog. As a result, from his adventure in 2078, he acquired a technologically advanced garapata gun. Later he also acquired the Thunderpuppy, a Harley Davidson V-Rod motorcycle.

As Wisedog/Dobermaxx, Polgas has fought many foes over the years, ranging from the mundane (drug pushers) to the fantastic (a lord of supernatural creatures). His most prominent foe is Atong Damuho (Renate Domingo), erstwhile drug pusher, dognapper, illegal logger and most recently, magic mushroom courier.

He appears in many other guises such as Dr. Sigmund Floyd (a spoof of Sigmund Freud), Pol Torero (WWE's The Undertaker; the term sepulturero or sepultorero translates to gravedigger, thus referring to him as "si Pol Torero"), Amorsolo (a non-existent Ninja Turtle, likely referencing National Artist Fernando Amorsolo), Aquapol (Aquaman), Growlsbuster (spoofing The Ghostbusters), Darth Paul (spoofing Darth Maul), Polverine (a spoof of Wolverine, an X-Men character) and many others.

=== The Tangaras ===
The Tangaras are two siblings from Gingoog City that both share a close relationship with the Sungcals, they are one of Pugad Baboy's few thin, slim residents. Their surname is a play on tanga, a Tagalog word for "stupid".

- Brosia (Ambrosia Tangara) – The Sungcal family's housemaid. She is brainless, as characterized by her nonsensical remarks and her mesmerization by reading materials in English. Medina eventually elaborated on this trait and said she couldn't afford to advance her studies. She does possess excellent math skills regarding financial issues such as bank accounts, deposits, salary computations, currencies, etc. As said by Dagul in Pugad Baboy 17, "'Pag sa pera nga pala 'di ka tanga no?" ("So, you're not dumb when it comes to money, huh?") She makes up for her general lack of intelligence (or formal schooling) with witty jokes, insults and pranks on the community's various residents. Her most frequent victim is Dagul, whose semi-baldness becomes the butt of her jokes, much to his chagrin. As revealed in The Bourney Ambrosity, there was an attempt by Polgas to recruit Brosia in the OCB, under the codename of "Amrita", but she was unable to absorb any of the physical, linguistic, and technical training, or so they thought; the amnesia inflicted on her in the storyline brings out this myriad of abilities, including dealing with English, but appear to be inaccessible if her original Brosia persona is active.
- 'Adre (Cesar "Butch" Tangara) – Brosia's older brother and Kules's best friend and fellow worker in Saudi Arabia. He shares the same interests and sentiments with Kules, sometimes with photos of their penpals. His relation to Brosia was revealed when he went home to the Philippines for a vacation (Kules was also home at the time). Adre is now also resigned from a job in Saudi Arabia following his best friend's wedding and now currently resides back to the Philippines for good. 'Adre is short for kumpadre or male best friend.

=== The Sabaybunots ===
The Sabaybunots reflect a very violent but tolerably quiet household. "Sabay, bunot!" is used by the Philippine military as an oral Tagalog command during martial ceremonies when the drawing of weapons is called for, as in the drawing of officers' swords. It roughly means "draw simultaneously". This may be in homage to Tomas' military background.

- Tomas, also known as Sarge (M/Sgt. Tomas Sabaybunot) – Representing the Philippine's military branch, he is a master sergeant of the Philippine Air Force. While said to be fearless and often trigger-happy, his "chauvinist pig" lifestyle is ironically neutralized by his dominant wife. He is often reduced to doing inane chores, and any attempt to complain about said chores results in physical battery by his wife, hilariously, to the point of that he considers wartime more peaceful than his domestic life. His name could be a pun on toma, Filipino slang for alcoholic drinks; Tomas does like to drink a lot, as does his cousin Igno. Tomas also likes to spend his "extra time" at disco bars, though this occasionally leads him to having gout. And though he has a large collection of guns, he suffers from a severe fear of needles. At the end of The Returnee story arc, Tomas retired from the military service following his new business, a new coffee plantation and a new military training facility in Cavite. The Tangeres' new farm is right beside his new place. He was stuck in Master Sergeant rank, joking that if he became a pimp to an officer who was unnamed, he will be promoted.
- Barbie (Barbara Q. Sabaybunot) – Tomas's wife. She frequently orders Tomas around, probably due to his chauvinism, his womanizing, and her extremely feministic views. This difference of opinion often turns into a physical altercation, such as Barbie giving a tiptoeing Tomas her trademarked uppercut whenever he arrives home in the wee hours of the morning drunk and/or smeared with the scent of women's perfume. Her maiden name (Barbie Q.) is a pun on barbecue. In Pugad Baboy 18, her first name was rendered "Barbara-Queen" (possibly after a local barbecue franchise called Grill Queen). She often spends her free time doing physical workouts (lifting weights, etc.). She is also hinted as a born-again Christian, as she holds or attends prayer meetings, and describes Tomas as "born-against," because of his sinful ways. Even in the realm of weapons, Barbie outguns her husband. Tomas is usually portrayed with his service pistol while Barbie often has an Uzi. Recently, Barbie was pregnant and born twin boys, which Tomas wanted to reach out for his friends for names, rejecting Noli's name Carl and Marcus, names made from Karl Marx.
- Paltik (Paul Thomas Sabaybunot), the couple's eldest son. While his friend Utoy can be described as the "brains", he can be described as the "jester". Quite mischievous in many ways, he often sleeps in class and is clearly much more interested in other areas, such as teasing his buck-toothed teacher, Miss Nobatos, typically comparing her face to that of a horse. He is also fond of bribing and blackmailing his own father, usually in exchange for some pocket money or other favors. His nickname is a Filipino term that means "homemade gun." The Philippine military also uses the term paltik to specifically refer to a handgun. The name is probably used by the cartoonist in reference to Paltik being a smaller version of his father, Tomas, who always likes to carry big guns.
- Darius and Draven (Darius Gerardo and Draven Bertino Sabaybunot), the couple's infant twin sons. Their first names were derived after the characters from League of Legends courtesy of Paltik while their second names are a nod after Barbie's twin uncles.

==== Igno ====
Igno (Benigno Ramos; not to be confused with the Sakdalista movement founder of the same name) – Introduced to the series in 1998 as a bodyguard for Mao's son Jong, Igno is Tomas' cousin and an ex-convict from the actual National Bilibid Prison in Muntinlupa. He claims he was incarcerated because of a Breach of Contract with his former boss, who employed him as a bodyguard. Possibly due to his being an ex-convict, he is actually more competent in survival skills than his cousin. He specializes in "improvised weapons employment", and even took a part-time job as a bounty hunter at one time in order to earn some cash. He drinks very often, but is afraid of ghosts and the supernatural. In fact, his frequent drinking caused his breath, blood and urine to become highly flammable, especially while drunk. Igno is also extremely tough and invulnerable, able to shrug off most things that, at worst, would have destroyed a normal person's body. His name is a play on ignoramus. At the end of the Returnee, Igno starts his own high-tech greenhouse beside his kubo. During the epilogue chapters of the "Dugo ng Shinobi" Arc, 33 years later, an aged Igno is still seen to be in good health despite his history of maintaining a very dangerous and unhealthy lifestyle.

=== The Lamouns ===
Lamon is a Tagalog verb meaning "to eat [food] in great quantities", or more loosely, "pig out", and is commonly used as a label pertaining to one's gluttony. The surname was spelled "Lamon" at first.

- Bab (Roberto Lamoun) – the resident true-blue hippie who is lazy and unemployed, although he sometimes moonlights as a folk singer and part-time PE teacher at Utoy, Paltik, and Joma's school. He is also unlucky in love, especially with Tiny, who was once his girlfriend for only two seconds. He has applied for and held many jobs over the years, but these never get off the ground. His job undertakings are described as "first-day, last-day" as he is often fired on his first day at work. Bab is usually referred by the rest of the community as a bad example and an occasional drug addict. When a story focuses on his addiction, he is said to be "using" marijuana (though one never actually sees him "using" the drug) and is sometimes seen with several marijuana leaves in his possession. Bab has also gotten himself infected with gonorrhea (shown in a minor arc in Pugad Baboy 19) and other sexually transmitted diseases on occasion. At the end of The Returnee story arc, the Tangeres lend Bab money so he can start his own artisanal bakery.
- Jolen (Joanne Elena Lamoun) – Bab's much younger sister. She is more intelligent than Bab (or at least more diligent), and is often reminded by their mother never to follow in her brother's footsteps, despite the many realities her brother himself imparts to her. She is also Utoy's girlfriend and often goes out with him, though they are both only eight to nine years old. She has a speech impediment as she pronounces her k's and s's as t's. However, this only manifests itself while she is singing. Jolen or holen is the Filipino term for marbles.
- Tita Cel (Cecilia Lamoun) – Bab and Jolen's mother. She disapproves of her son and dotes on her daughter. She despises Bab's smoking vice, as this led to the death of her husband (Rodrigo Lamoun, as mentioned in Pugad Baboy XI). She has no qualms in hiding her disappointment of her near-useless son and states it outright, as seen in Pugad Baboy X.
- Daddy (Rodrigo Lamoun) – Bab and Jolen's late father, and Tita Cel's husband. In one strip, it is mentioned that he died of lung cancer while working as a rabbit farmer in Tagaytay. Hence how he is used as a scare tactic by Tita Cel whenever she catches her son smoking, to no avail. It is also mentioned in one arc by Polgas (posing as Dr. Sigmund Floyd) that Bab's only fear is his father.

=== The Tangeres ===
- Ka Noli (Nolasco M. Tangere) – the resident communist who is a proud member of the New People's Army. While he believes in the merits of communism and calls most of the other residents capitalists, not only does he manage to have drinking sessions with them, but he is also very good friends with them. Tomas, a natural enemy, is his best friend. Ironically, Medina says he and his son enjoy playing Monopoly. As time went on, his espousing of his beliefs occurred less and less frequently to the point of readers being reminded that he is of the NPA only in the most subtle of situations. As such, jokes about his Ilocano heritage and the mountain-based lifestyle that comes of being in the NPA are often cracked at his expense instead. Because of him, Tomas is able to find allies in the NPA whenever the need arises, such as in Retraining, though not always. His name is derived from the title of Noli Me Tangere, the first novel of the Philippine national hero, Jose Rizal. Recent strips have shown that Ka Noli and his wife Ka Beza had officially defected from the New People's Army, as of Pugad Baboy: The Returnee 122, updated November 29, 2016, at Rappler.com. They started their own farm beside Tomas' new training facility, specializing in exotic animals. Because they still hold socialist beliefs, they also lend money to other Pugad Baboy residents such as Dagul and Bab, so that their business benefits their neighbors and friends as well.
- Joma (Jose Maria Tangere) – Ka Noli and Ka Beza's eldest son. While he is aware of his father's beliefs, he hangs out with Utoy and Paltik often and attends the same school they do. He is named after Jose Maria "Joma" Sison, founder of the Communist Party of the Philippines.
- Ka Beza (Bezalie Tangere), Ka Noli's wife, who appears to have an "allergic reaction to soldiers," resulting in Tomas being her target practice whenever she's around. Just like her husband Nolasco, she had also defected from the New People's Army (as of Pugad Baboy: The Returnee 122, updated November 29, 2016, at Rappler.com.) Her name "Ka Beza", is a reference to the word Cabeza, which means, "The head of a small town/county or barangay".
- Melo (Marx Engels Tangere), Ka Noli and Ka Beza's infant son. His name is a reference to Karl Marx and Friedrich Engels, co-authors of the Communist Manifesto.

=== The Tangs ===
- Mao (Mauricio Tang) – the resident Chinese-Filipino who hails from Fujian Province and owns a sari-sari store (a small retail store) in Pugad Baboy. He often believes in business sense, earning money and he sometimes brandishes a sword on whoever earns his ire, especially those who do not pay their dues. His name is play on ma-utang, which in Tagalog, translates roughly to "one who likes to borrow money."
- Pao (Paulino Tang) – the resident homosexual and Mao's son. A friend of Tiny, his tastes and attitude are typically gay. This even caused him trouble once when he was mistaken for a pregnant woman by a horde of monsters and he did not want to admit his real gender. His father once expressed disappointment over him as he remarked that Pao has a resemblance to basketball player "Gelli Codiñela." He also owns a beauty parlor and works his way through college at the same time. His name is a play on pa-utang, which, in Tagalog, translates roughly to "Can I borrow some money?". It is mentioned in one arc that he has a brother named "Jong" (Ji Ong) who works in Taiwan.
- Coleen (Anne Coleen Tang) - Introduced to the strip in January 2013, Coleen is Pao's sister that stayed and studied in China. She is the opposite of Pao in some aspects, being a lesbian and possessing a very athletic body due to her vegetarianism. As evidenced in her exchanges with Father Marty, she's also an atheist. Her full name is a play of the Tagalog Phrase Ang Kulintang, "The Kulintang" (an indigenous musical instrument of the Maguindanao, Philippines).
- Jong (Jong Tang) - Mao's other son and Pao and Coleen's brother. He resides in Taiwan and was introduced during Pugad Baboy 11 when he pays his family in the Philippines a visit. Like his father, he's a clever and cunning businessman.

=== The Cabalfins ===
- Senator Cabalfin (Sen. Usurpo Cabalfin) – the resident member of the Philippine Senate. He is seen more playing children's games and spending people's taxes on his own indulgences rather than doing his job as a legislator. He is created by Medina as a reflection of corrupt government officials. His personal name Usurpo is derived from the word usurp. Cabalfin once served as the prime antagonist in the Conspigracy arc.
- Madame Cabalfin (Diana Elizabeth Cabalfin), Senator Cabalfin's equally corrupt wife (based on Imelda Marcos).
- Bong (Enrique Noel Cabalfin), Senator and Madame Cabalfin's son and Sen. Cabalfin's only legitimate child, who is not really part of the inner circle of the other four kids.

=== Other characters ===
- Joboy (Joey Boy Llabe) – the resident mechanic who has a knack for cars and often likes to drive fast (in fact, he is a speed maniac). His last name is the Filipino word for wrench, from the Spanish llave. Formerly the fattest resident of Pugad Baboy but due to acquiring Diabetes, his diet had reduced his weight significantly.
- Father Marty (Fr. Mario Martinez), the town Priest and Bab's priest-friend, he studied canon law at the Vatican before moving back to Pugad Baboy.
- Tata Mads (Amado Pascala) – the resident musician who once taught Tiny voice lessons and sometimes comes to Dagul to comment on his awful singing. His name is a play on tamad ("lazy") due to the seemingly easy-going lifestyle of musicians and other people in the field of creative arts; though his appearances in the strip have decreased over the years, he does not appear to be truly lazy.
- Doc Sebo (Miguel Sebo, MD) – the resident physician who specializes in circumcision, but is generally shown to be weak and incompetent in anything else in his profession. In early strips, he prescribes only one kind of medicine – aspirin. Sebo is Tagalog for congealed fat or solidified lard.
- Miss Nobatos (Eusebia Nobatos) – Utoy, Paltik, Joma, and Jolen's teacher. She often rages at Paltik for his jokes and actions, particularly when he refers to her as a horse, and takes too many doses of aspirin because of him and any other shenanigans her other students cause. Her name is a play on the Spanish term novatos, meaning "new race horse."
- Patrolman Durugas (PFC Romeo Durugas) – a police officer who often apprehends drivers mostly for no apparent reason and receives bribes from them. Dagul happens to be one of those disgruntled motorists. He is created by Medina based on the Filipinos' general view on policemen as corrupt. In Tagalog, mandurugas means "one who cheats".

=== Recurring minor characters ===
There are also recurring characters in the strip, including:

- Barbie's mother (unnamed), the stereotypical mother-in-law for Tomas from Parañaque who rues about death and her home city's water problem;
- Dagul's mother (Brenda), an ironically thin yet overly concerned woman;
- Boy Bura and Boy Tibar (real names never mentioned), bodyguards of the Cabalfin family;
- Lucio (last name never mentioned), Sen. Cabalfin's accountant;
- Attorney Adriano (first name never mentioned), the fiscal;
- Doctor Rosa, a dentist who scares her patient with a pair of dental pliers whenever she gets agitated or teased by the characters;
- "Principal Schwarzenegger" (Arnold Palacio), the ugly school principal who is as exasperated as Miss Nobatos when it comes to seeing Paltik in his office;
- Nadir Hamid Mohammad, Kules's employer and is the subject of many smelly jokes as part of the Filipino stereotypical view that Arabs are foul-smelling;
- Jacques Vousvoulez, Dagul's French employer and the head chef of the hotel where Dagul works. His name is a French stylization of "bubuli", the Filipino word for skink. It was revealed by Debbie that his wife's name is Fifi;
- Rosanna (last name not mentioned), a buxom local mestiza, who as part of a running gag, is a frequent victim of coconut thieves (often Bab, Tomas and Igno) but not before being viewed naked by these thieves through her window. Her character and name are based on the sexy Filipina actress, Rosanna Roces;
- Frostee (a play on the word prostitute, of which she is), the sexy Japayuki (a female Filipino worker in Japan);
- Mang Igme (full name never mentioned), a fishball vendor who believes that the fishball industry is the solution to the poverty in the Philippines;
- Brando, Tiny's current boyfriend, being a chef from Malate has unfortunately earned him the ire of the very much paranoid Mang Dagul, who feels the former will replace him as the family's chef. However, Dagul seems to have grown a little more comfortable with him as he no longer seems to hold anything against him sometimes;
- The Los Kosas Muntinlupas, a trio of fellow ex-inmates and Igno's supposed friends. Wakali who is bald and has a mole on his nose, Lino who is the skinny one, and Don who has a shaved head and moustache. Though they have appeared on previous book covers and have a cameo appearance in Benigno Ramos: Bounty Hunter, they are introduced properly in Pugad Baboy XX;
- Dado (Dado Galang, M.D.), a practicing veterinarian, Dado's most notable trait is an unusual brand of lycanthropy -a result of his mother's maternal craving for dog meat- which he can control and benefit from outside his werewolf form in terms of his sensory abilities. Originating from Pampanga, he has since moved to Manila and occasionally returns to aid Polgas in other battles, such as in The Bourne Ambrosity; and others.
- Amir Saeed – Mandana's partner and subordinate. It was revealed by Polgas that he is British-Pakistani. His surname, however, was not revealed.
- Ms. Winnie Catala – Pugad Baboy Academy Librarian. Only seen in some few strips in various book compilations. Her name was revealed in Pugad Baboy 24, page 2. She despises loud noises and unruly behavior inside the Pugad Baboy Library.
- Penny - the recent new character of Pugad Baboy and she was introduced to the strip in December 2016, dubbed as a small female person, she was a cashier in Bab's Bakeshop, she's previously worked with Pao in a Beauty Hair Salon, and she's also Bab's secretary, accountant and saleswoman in the bakeshop.
- Otep – the delivery and errand boy of Bab's Bakeshop. An impatient and short-tempered PWD with Poliomyelitis. He is also sometimes called Osep.
- Ken – a deaf PWD who works as a waiter for the restaurant of the Sungcals.
- Alice – Doc. Sebo's Nurse. An outstanding Nurse despite having Down syndrome.
- Annie – the head of charcuterie at the Tangere Family's Farm. Despite being blind, she had a very keen sense of smell and revealed herself to be a psychic.
- Mr. Severo Morales – the resident bitter old man. He is judgmental and cares a lot of being politically correct. His favorite pastime is visiting popular websites looking for comments that can offend him in order to have an excuse to enter an argument.
- Nash – Coleen's Dwarf friend. Initially, he was dismissed as a figment of Coleen's imagination until Annie, revealed to have a Third Eye confirmed his existence.
- Pablo – the local Shinobi and later Samurai vigilante that protects the Pugad Baboy's indigenous settlement, 'Manggahan' from evil elements.

Other minor characters in the strips serve as antagonists to the residents. See: Villains of Pugad Baboy. On the other hand, the Pugad Baboy gang are often aided by friends and acquaintances they meet during these escapades. See each article of the story arcs for info on these allies.

Prominent personalities, both local and foreign, have also made cameo appearances in Pugad Baboy. Among them are presidents Ramos, Estrada, and Arroyo, martial artist Ernesto Presas, politicians Robert Jaworski, Rene Saguisag and Richard Gordon, singer Freddie Aguilar, comedian Leo Martinez, boxer Manny Pacquiao, Pope John Paul II, Mel Gibson, and Michael Jackson.

Medina drew many of the above minor characters for the covers of some compilations, but these did not appear in the selected strips. Some of these appeared either earlier in the comic strip's run (such as Father Marty) while others were just mere extras (such as the Los Kosas Muntinlupas, Igno's former fellow inmates in Bilibid Prison). Many of these were only given official names in "character guide" supplements in compilations (such as the inmates and the school principal, mostly hitherto unnamed). These names are then carried over to future strips.

== Stylistic elements ==
British English words are prevalent in the strip (like -ise words) and Medina uses these kinds of words in his own write-ups.

=== Age ===
The characters are typically ageless, and their actual ages are usually vague. The few characters whose present ages are stated are Dagul (48), and the kids (8 or 9). Utoy and 'Adre are the only characters to have visibly aged in the strip through the years, barring flashbacks (Utoy first appeared as a baby; 'Adre has lately lost some of his hair). A "holdover hippie" from the 1960s, Bab nevertheless seems to be only in his twenties or thirties, which would be impossible in real life. In the early-1990s story arc Ang Hiwaga ng Dueñas (published in Pugad Baboy 4) the faith healer Mang Danilo, an old acquaintance, mentions that Bab was teenaged at the time of Woodstock (Bab immediately covers the faith healer's mouth as the word "Woodstock" is mentioned). A series of strips published in Pugad Baboy X (1998) implies that Bab is at least over 28 years old. In the same compilation, Tita Cel mentions that Jolen is 27 years younger than Bab and since the stock age of the Pugad Baboy children is 8–9, Bab is possibly 35–36. The first volume of the Polgas Comics collections has a story called "Class Reunion" illustrated by Jerald Dorado which has Bab attending an elementary class reunion for the 'Batch of 1969' which further enforces this view of his age.

=== Recurring jokes ===
One of the strip's running gags is the depiction (or at least the description) of Arabs having very foul body odor. Examples of this running gag are Kules' Saudi friend, which the former calls Lancaster (because the friend smells like the langka or jack fruit), and the stinky concentrated chemical agent PSSI (pawis ng singit ng sundalong Iraqi or Iraqi soldier's jock sweat) mentioned in the story arc The Baguio Connection. This running gag is likely based on the author's personal experience. It is also reasonable, considering that the desert atmosphere in most Arab countries prevents their people from taking daily baths. Other such gags include the monotonous diet of chicken in Saudi Arabia (also likely based on personal experience), Paltik's blatant aversion to the "coming of age" ritual of circumcision, and Polgas and Dagul de-appetizing Debbie on the breakfast table. And stereotyped Iraqis are seen in earlier works.

=== Authorial presence ===
Medina usually voices out his takes on events, people and the like through Polgas and Mang Dagul. (Polgas is also recurringly shown as a comic strip artist, like his creator.) According to Medina, the characters he most identifies with are Polgas, Mang Dagul, and Utoy; like him, they wear earrings on their left ears. Medina himself has even appeared once in the strip proper, holding a cartooning workshop in Palawan, though he avoids breaking the fourth wall by not referring to himself as the strip's creator.

== Major story arcs ==
As mentioned earlier in this article, the strip does not showcase domestic life alone as Medina has created story arcs which involve the various characters in adventurous, dramatic or other plotted situations.

There is no standard as how long a story arc may last, since it can run from several weeks to a few months. The story arc is only titled when it is included in a compilation.

This list below contains named story arcs that last at least 15 strips long and which compilation each appears.

- Bakasyon (15 strips, The Best of Pugad Baboy) - The gang's vacation in La Union is rudely interrupted by Taokoy (mermen).
- Baboy Scouts (24 strips, Pugad Baboy 3) - The kids go on a camping trip with their Scoutmaster, and are captured by a band of Amazons who want the Scoutmaster to impregnate their queen!
- Wisedog (17 strips, Pugad Baboy 3) - Polgas, alias Wisedog, investigates a series of pet dog disappearances.
- The Baguio Connection (51 strips, Pugad Baboy 3) - Kules, Tomas, Noli, Bab, Joboy and Pao, plus Wisedog, investigate ube jam spiked with cannabias sativa in Baguio.
- Retraining (45 strips, Pugad Baboy 4) - Tomas is sent for retraining, and soon becomes involved in stopping a ring that sells children to gay pedophiles
- The Malunggay Conflict (30 strips, Pugad Baboy 4) - in Ilocos, the gang must help Ka Kwate fight off the attempted annexation of his land by Ka Damuseyn (parody of the First Gulf War).
- Ang Hiwaga ng Dueñas (52 strips, Pugad Baboy 4) - the gang's vacation in Dueñas turns into a rescue mission when Pao is mistaken for a pregnant woman, and kidnapped by supernatural beings to use as a human sacrifice.
- Feminist (34 strips, PB5) - Barbie and Debbie take on Tomas and Dagul in a battle to prove who is the weaker sex.
- Olympig Games (19 strips, PB5) - the Pugad Baby residents compete in a series of hilarious Olympic-style games featuring traditional Filipino events such as patintero, gagamba (spider) fighting, Tex and holen (marbles).
- 2078 (45 strips, PB5) - the gang get transported to 2078, learning about the future of the Philippines. Polgas meets Dobermaxx, and helps him fight a gang of drug pushers.
- Maidnappers (88 strips, PB5) - Tiny's Filipino-American cousin Gwen visits, accompanied by her yaya Gloria. Brosia and Gloria are mistaken for Gwen and kidnapped.
- The Olongapo Caper (49 strips, Pugad Baboy 6) - Bab and Joboy's trip to Olongapo turns sour when they have to help their new friend Philip save his sister Pinky from a prostitution ring.
- Oplan Paglalanse (23 strips, Pugad Baboy 7) - the Pugad Baboy kids (Utoy, Paltik and Joma) join Polgas in forming a vigilante group (The Walang Payat Gang) to punish the corrupt police officers preying on the citizens of Pugad Baboy.
- Alamang Boy (26 strips, Pugad Baboy 7) - the disappearance of Tomas' goat leads to trouble when Senator Cabalfin's son is accused of the crime.
- Col. Manyakis (35 strips, pugad baboy 8) - the tables are turned when Tomas' new superior, Lieutenant Colonel Violeta Kainam, begins sexually harassing him. Tomas soon has reason to suspect that she is involved in criminal activities.
- Father Marty (21 strips, Pugad Baboy 9) - Bab's childhood friend Father Marty, a new Catholic priest, returns to Pugad Baboy.
- Kulto (41 strips, Pugad Baboy 9) - the Walang Payat Gang suspect that Bong Cabalfin has become involved in a doomsday cult
- James Bab (38 strips, Pugad Baboy X) - Polgas, as Dobermaxx, recruits Bab as a spy (spoof of James Bond). However, James Bab's first mission soon gets him involved in battling a gang of bank robbers.
- Matrona (23 strips, Pugad Baboy X) - Bab gets the surprise of his life when Girlie, his mom's (Tita Cel's) friend, turns out to be a cougar who hits on him.
- Apo Hikers (62 strips, Pugad Baboy XI) - the Pugad Baboy gang and Dobermaxx join forces with guide Mel and his bobcat named Bobcat to fight illegal loggers on Mount Apo.
- Paraiso (54 strips, Pugad Baboy XII) - Dagul, Debbie and Khalid aid Dobermaxx in fighting off illegal fishermen from mainland China in Palawan.
- Private Investigator! (77 strips, PB the 13th) - Dagul becomes Bardagul Kapote, private investigator. Assisted by sidekick Brossy (Brosia), they try to solve the mystery of a bombing in a mall cinema.
- Babman (37 strips, Katorse) - Bab becomes Babman, the Pork Knight, as he tries to protect Gothom City from goons tying to scare them off.
- Aso (88 strips, Kinse!) - Polgas' investigations of a dope farm in Pampanga take a crazy turn when a werewolf gets involved!
- Benigno Ramos: Bounty Hunter (71 strips, Pugad Baboy Sunday Comics) - Igno is hired by the Ang brothers to catch Rudolf Cruz, but must use his wits to survive when the police try to bring him in alongside Rudolf!
- Bodyguard (53 strips, Pugad Baboy 21) - Tomas has trouble guarding VIP Cris, the spoiled son of General Caldera.
- Green Heroine (87 strips, PB 24) - Tiny, as Obesa Vanidosa, Pao and a Korean named Mr. Shin investigate a series of possible terrorist acts.
- The Bourne Ambrosity (126 strips, 25) - an amnesiac Brosia suddenly gains crazy spy skills in a spoof of The Bourne Identity.
- Ang Punyal ni Devlino (71 strips, 27) - Polgas, the Walang Payat Gang, Brosia and Coleen join forces to save the other Pugad Baboy residents from the revenge of the supernatural creatures.
- The Girl from Persia (74 strips, 28) - Kules gets into all sorts of trouble on a vacation home when the Iranian girl he is courting, Mandana, turns out to be involved with terrorists!
- Mad Mountain Nectar (57 strips, 29) - Dobermaxx investigates when he encounters a honey that boosts people's physical strength!
- The Returnee (127 strips, XXX) - Tomas goes on the run when a military mission to retrieve a returnee turns sour.
- Dugo ng Shinobi (115 strips, 31) - Bardagul Kapote, James Bab, and Igno investigate a string of murders that implicate the neighborhood scrap collector, Pablo.

Not included in the list above is Planet of the Dogs, Medina's homage/parody to Planet of the Apes. This story arc (which appeared in Disi-Sais!) is relatively short at only nine strips long. Since that arc, it took Medina three years before he came up with Benigno Ramos: Bounty Hunter, and then another three with Bodyguard.

== Books and merchandise ==
The first compilation of Pugad Baboy comic strips was originally part of a thesis by Frank Aldana, a student of De La Salle University. This compilation became so popular that Medina himself made more. Typically, a new compilation is released near the start of each year. Including Aldana's compilation, there are currently 34 Pugad Baboy compilation books:

- Pugad Baboy One (originally, The Very Best of Pugad Baboy)
- The Best of Pugad Baboy (officially, this is the second compilation)
- Pugad Baboy 3
- Pugad Baboy 4
- PB5 (Pugad Baboy 5)
- Pugad Baboy 6
- Pugad Baboy 7
- pugad baboy eight
- Pugad baboy 9
- Pugad Baboy X (commemorating the tenth anniversary of the comic strip)
- Pugad Baboy XI
- Pugad Baboy XII
- PB the 13th (Pugad Baboy 13)
- Katorse (Pugad Baboy 14)
- Kinse! (Pugad Baboy 15)
- Disi-Sais! (Pugad Baboy 16)
- 17 (Pugad Baboy 17)
- 18 eighteen (Pugad Baboy 18)
- Pugad Baboy Sunday Comics (first one in full color)
- Pugad Baboy nineteen
- Pugad Baboy XX (commemorating the twentieth anniversary of the comic strip)
- Pugad Baboy 21
- Pugad Baboy 22
- Pugad Baboy Sunday Comics 2 (second one in full color)
- Pugad Baboy 23
- Pugad Baboy 24
- 25 (Pugad Baboy 25)
- Pugad Baboy Sunday Comics 3 (half colored, half not colored. This is the last of the Sunday Comics Series)
- 26 (Pugad Baboy 26)
- 27 (Pugad Baboy 27)
- 28 (Pugad Baboy 28)
- 29 (Pugad Baboy 29)
- XXX (Pugad Baboy 30th Anniversary Special)
- Pugad Baboy 31
- Pugad Baboy 32
- Pugad Baboy 33
- Pugad Baboy 34

Medina also made other Pugad Baboy original works:

- Pugad Baboy: Endangered Species - a coloring book by Pol Medina.
- Pugad Baboy: Philippine Games - another coloring book by Medina.
- Pirata – an original graphic novel about Polgas befriending a reformed Muslim pirate named Khalid and their quest for the pirate group to surrender. It was intended to be the first of a graphic novel series called Polgas – Ang Asong Hindi, but was made a stand-alone graphic novel because of the time and effort given to its creation, as well as the seriousness and darkness of its story compared to the hilarity of Pugad Baboy itself.
- Two Polgas – Ang Asong Hindi books actually appeared, sporting a smaller, regular-sized format than Pirata. Printed in black and white, unlike Pirata, they were produced as a joint effort between Medina and the Alamat Comics Group, an independent comics company. These books were Baboyani (a portmanteau of baboy and bayani, Filipino for "hero") an alternate universe adventure which recasts the characters as rebels in the late-19th century Philippine Revolution against Spanish rule; and Conspigracy, a story that takes place during an excursion in Laguna. Nolan Clemente (who is credited as Medina's inspiration for the character Ka Noli) wrote the scripts for both books. In actuality, Medina only contributed the art for the covers and title pages; the rest of the art was done by other artists. The afterword for the second book teased the production of a third story which would supposedly see the Pugad Baboy characters go into space, but this was never produced.
  Christmas-themed Polgas P-gurine c. 1995
- Pugad Baboy Adbyenturs featuring an original story called Gayuma, set sometime after Pugad Baboy 5. The story had Bab finally succeed in convincing Tiny to fall in love with him, while also coming up against a familiar foe. The comic was illustrated in full color by artists from Alamat, where Medina was only somewhat involved. The story was written by Eric Santos, who also co-wrote Conspigracy.
- Polgas comics – a "magazine" of original strips by Medina and other artists which also contained a spoof "horoscope" and some exotic recipes, saw at least two issues.
- Green Papaya - a full-colored strip focusing on the character of Pablo, one of the five missing siblings of Polgas, who resides in Hawaii. The short-lived strip was created for a publication marketed for Overseas Filipino Workers in the United States. The few strips that saw publication were included in the 20th Pugad Baboy book.
- Pugad Baboy: Marcos Special - a full-color compilation of Pugad Baboy strips focused around the topic of Ferdinand Marcos and the issue of Martial Law in the Philippines.
- The Blood Of The Shinobi - The very 1st all original English comic book series by Pol Medina, Jr. was launched in 2018.
- Pugad Baboy Presents: Dagul X Brando: A Cook Book - The very 1st all original Tagalog cook book created also by Pol Medina, Jr. was launched in 2024
- Green Village: A Pugad Baboy Prequel - A full-color series of strips set prior to the events of the main Pugad Baboy series. The story focuses on the Pugad Baboy kids befriending a group of orphans and a rescued dog who happens to be one of the five missing siblings of the character of Polgas. The strip began serialization in the first issue of the Komiket Magazine published and released on February 28, 2026 and will continue to run throughout the next few issues of the magazine.

The popularity of Pugad Baboy also spawned some merchandise such as DogStyle Apparel and Polgas P-gurines (a set of figurines depicting Polgas and some Polgas characters). They are currently distributed by Medina's company, Pol Medina Jr. Novelties.

On September 25, 1993, Pugad Baboy was made into a live-action TV show called Rated PB (Pang-Bayan) – Pugad Baboy Sa TV. Directed by Leo Martinez, the show featured Edgar Mortiz (Bab), Giselle Sanchez (Brosia) and Rudy Meyer (Mang Dagul) among the cast. Though the show was live-action, the opening logo featured limited animation. Some of the episodes were based upon earlier plots in the strip, while others followed a skit show format. It was aired on GMA 7 and lasted only two seasons, 15 episodes in all.

In the ninth book, Medina states that he dreams of making a Pugad Baboy cartoon.

Besides Pugad Baboy books, Medina has also published compilations of his editorial cartoons for the Philippine Daily Inquirer, called the Ink and Politics series. The cartoons sometimes feature Pugad Baboy characters. Polgas always appears on covers of these books. Three books were initially published as the newspaper stopped hiring him as substitute political cartoonist in around 2006, but Medina later created a fourth compilation based upon political illustrations he created during his brief time with Philippine Star.

Medina includes photos and caricatures of himself in some of the strip's compilations.

Some Pugad Baboy characters can be seen on the ads of Dencio's, a notable restaurant chain in the Philippines. They are also featured as endorsers of Quake Overload Cakes, a line of pastries made by snack company Jack 'N Jill. Animation has been done by another great Pinoy artist, Arnold Arre
