= Van der Pol =

Van der Pol (also "Van de Pol", "Van de Poll", "Van den Pol" or "Van Pol") is a Dutch, toponymic surname, originally meaning "from the raised land". Notable people with the surname include:

Van der Pol(l) / Vanderpol

- Alfred Vanderpol (1854–1915), French engineer, philanthropist and author
- Anneliese van der Pol (born 1984), Dutch-born American actress and singer
- Balthasar van der Pol (1889–1959), Dutch physicist
  - a.o. known for the Van der Pol oscillator and the Bonhoeffer-van der Pol model
- Jaap van der Poll (1914–2010), Dutch javelin thrower
- Jos van der Pol (born 1961), Dutch conceptual and installation artist
- Liesbeth van der Pol (born 1959), Dutch architect

Van de Pol

- Piet van de Pol (1907–1996), Dutch billiards player

Van den Pol

- Anthony van den Pol (1949–2020), Yale Professor of Neurosurgery

Van Pol

- Christiaan van Pol (1752–1813), Dutch flower painter
- Thijs van Pol (born 1991), Dutch football forward
- Vera van Pol (born 1993), Dutch artistic gymnast
- Louis van der Pol (1896–1982), Dutch impressionist painter

== See also ==
- 10443 van der Pol, main-belt asteroid named after Balthasar van der Pol
- Pol (disambiguation)
- Van de Poll, Dutch noble family
- Jacob R. H. Neervoort van de Poll (1862–1924), Dutch entomologist
