= Polarity =

Polarity may refer to:

== Science ==
- Electrical polarity, direction of electrical current
- Polarity (mutual inductance), the relationship between components such as transformer windings
- Polarity (projective geometry), in mathematics, a duality of order two
- Polarity in embryogenesis, the animal and vegetal poles within a blastula
- Cell polarity, differences in the shape, structure, and function of cells
- Chemical polarity, in chemistry, a separation of electric charge
- Magnetic polarity, north or south poles of a magnet
- Polar reciprocation, a concept in geometry also known as polarity
- Trilinear polarity, a concept in geometry of the triangle
- Polarity of a literal, in mathematical logic

== Humanities ==
- Polarity (international relations), a description of the distribution of power within the international system
- Polarity of gender, when a word takes the opposite grammatical gender than expected
- Polarity item, in linguistics, the sensitiveness of some expression to negative or affirmative contexts
- Affirmation and negation, also known as grammatical polarity
- Sexual polarity, a concept of dualism between masculine and feminine

== Other uses ==
- Polarity (game), a board game
- Polarity (Decrepit Birth album), 2010
- Polarity (Norman album), 2003
- Polarity (The Wedding album), 2007

== See also ==
- Astrological sign § Polarity – Polarity and the four elements
- Polar (disambiguation)
- Polarization (disambiguation)
- Pole (disambiguation)
- Dualism (disambiguation)
- Symmetric bilinear form § Orthogonal polarities
