= Polar =

Polar(s) may refer to:

== Geography ==
- Geographical pole, either of the two points on Earth where its axis of rotation intersects its surface
  - Polar climate, the climate common in polar regions
  - Polar regions of Earth, locations within the polar circles, referred to as the Arctic and Antarctic

=== Places ===
- Polar, Wisconsin, town in Langlade County, Wisconsin, United States
  - Polar (community), Wisconsin, unincorporated community in Langlade County, Wisconsin, United States

== Arts, entertainment, and media ==
=== Music ===
- Polar (album), second album by the High Water Marks
- Polar Music, a record label
- Polar Studios, music studio of ABBA in Sweden
- Polars (album), an album by the Dutch metal band, Textures

=== Other uses in arts, entertainment, and media ===
- Polar, a 2002 novel by T. R. Pearson
- Polar (webcomic), a webcomic and series of graphic novels by Víctor Santos
  - Polar (film), a 2019 Netflix film adaption of the comic series
- PoLAR, the journal of the Association for Political and Legal Anthropology

== Brands and enterprises ==
- Polar Air Cargo, an American airline
- Polar Airlines, a Russian airline
- Polar Beverages, an American soft drink company
- Polar Caravans, a Swedish caravan manufacturer
- Polar Electro, a Finnish manufacturer of sports training computers
- Sisu Polar, a truck model series produced by the Finnish heavy vehicle producer Sisu Auto

== Linguistics ==
- Grammatical polarity, a grammatical category of affirmative vs. negative
- Polar question, a question that can be answered yes or no

== Mathematics ==
- Polar point group, a symmetry in geometry and crystallography
- Pole and polar (a point and a line), a construction in geometry
  - Polar cone
  - Polar coordinate system, uses a central point and angles
  - Polar curve (a point and a curve), a generalization of a point and a line
  - Polar set, with respect to a bilinear pairing of vector spaces

== Science and technology ==
- Chemical polarity, a concept in chemistry which describes how equally bonding electrons are shared between atoms
- Polar (satellite), a satellite launched by NASA in 1996
- Polar (star), a strongly magnetic cataclysmic variable star system
- POLAR III and POLAR II, a pedestrian test dummy created by Honda, used to study pedestrian injuries in road traffic accidents
- Polars (software), an open-source software library for data manipulation

== Other uses ==
- Polar (musician), Norwegian electronic music producer

== See also ==
- Festival Polar de Cognac, a French festival focused on crime fiction
- Polar curve (aviation), a diagram that depicts the gliding performance of an aircraft
- Polar fleece, an insulating synthetic wool fabric
- Polar organelle, a specialised region of the cell membrane found surrounding the flagella base(s) in some bacteria
- Polar overdominance a form of genetic mutation
- Polarity (disambiguation)
- Polarization (disambiguation)
- Pole (disambiguation)
