= Englerocharis =

Scientific classification
- Kingdom: Plantae
- Clade: Tracheophytes
- Clade: Angiosperms
- Clade: Eudicots
- Clade: Rosids
- Order: Brassicales
- Family: Brassicaceae
- Genus: Englerocharis; Muschl.

Genus of plants

Englerocharis is a genus of flowering plants belonging to the family Brassicaceae.

Its native range is Peru and Bolivia.

The genus name of Englerocharis is in honour of Adolf Engler (1844–1930), a German botanist, and also; charis, a Greek word meaning "grace, kindness, and life". It was first published and described in Bot. Jahrb. Syst. Vol.40 on page 276 in 1908.

Known species:

- Englerocharis ancashensis Al-Shehbaz, A.Cano & Trinidad
- Englerocharis blanca-leoniae Al-Shehbaz, P.Gonzáles & A.Cano
- Englerocharis cuzcoensis Al-Shehbaz
- Englerocharis dentata Al-Shehbaz & A.Cano
- Englerocharis pauciflora Al-Shehbaz
- Englerocharis peruviana Muschl.
