= Nicolas Pol =

French contemporary artist

- Born: 1977 (age 48–49); Paris
- Education: École nationale supérieure des beaux-arts
- Known for: Painter

Nicolas Pol (born 1977, Paris) is a French contemporary artist.

== Biography ==
He lives in Africa and in France where he graduated from the École nationale supérieure des beaux-arts and from the University of la Sorbonne, specialized in cinéma.

He works and lives in Paris.

== Exhibitions ==
=== Group shows ===
- Plus que vrai, École nationale supérieure des beaux-arts, Paris, 2005
- J'en rêve, Fondation Cartier, Paris, 2005
- Parisites, avec Julien Berthier et Lilly Phung, London, 2006

=== Solo shows ===
- Martus Maw, New York City, 2009
- Mother of Pouacrus The Old Dairy, London, 2010
- Neverlodge, New York City, 2012
- EPEKTASIS, Istanbul, 2012
- After Modern Vermin Control, Milan, 2013
- Hurts twice as much, OSME Galley, Vienna, 2015
- Institut Culturel Bernard Magrez, Bordeaux, 2016
- Le froid, le feu et le fouet, Galerie D.X, Bordeaux, 2018

== Music ==
- 2014 : Twin Arrows, artwork, with Check Morris Twin Arrows, le nouvel album
