= Depolarization (disambiguation) =

Depolarization or depolarizer may refer to:

- Depolarization, a decrease in the absolute value of a cell's membrane potential
- Depolarizer, a substance used to depolarize an electrochemical cell
- Depolarization ratio, the intensity ratio between the parallel component and the perpendicular component of Raman scattered light
- Depolarizer (optics), a device for randomizing the polarization of light
