= Emmanuel Clive Pohl =

Australian businessman and philanthropist

Dr Emmanuel Clive (Manny) Pohl AM
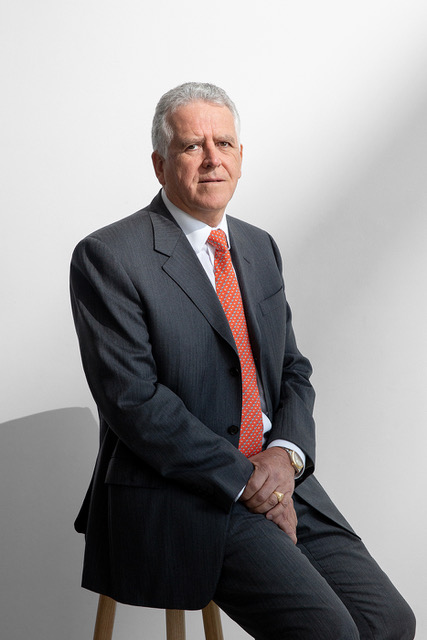
- Born: Johannesburg, South Africa
- Citizenship: Australian (since 1986)
- Occupation: Businessman
- Known for: Entrepreneurship (investment market), philanthropy
- Spouse: Gail Pohl
- Children: Hilton Pohl, Jared Pohl, Jason Pohl

Emmanuel Clive (Manny) Pohl, AM, is an Australian businessman (investment manager) and philanthropist.

== Business career ==
=== Stockbroking ===
After four years operating as a consultant, Pohl joined Ed Hern Rudolph Inc., a then medium sized brokerage firm based at the Johannesburg Stock Exchange (JSE). Over his four years at the firm (January 1986-May 1989), he twice achieved a personal ranking in the annual Financial Mail Stockbrokers’ Ratings (now the ‘Financial Mail Ranking the Analysts Survey’).

During his tenure at Davis Borkum Hare & Co Inc (1989-1994) Pohl was a member of the South African delegation to the 1991 Annual Meeting of the Board of Governors of the World Bank and the International Monetary Fund in Bangkok.

=== Australia (1994-present) ===
In July 1994, after settling in Queensland, Pohl took up the position of Private Portfolio Manager with Westpac Investment Management, Ltd Brisbane. He left Westpac in December 1995 to join Queensland-based Wilson HTM Ltd stockbrokers (now Wilsons) as Managing Director of its wholly owned subsidiary, Wilson HTM Asset Management (WAML), described by Pohl in 2002 as a “bottom-up stock picker” whose overall investment process was automated and “military”.

==== Hyperion Asset Management ====
In 1996 Wilson HTM Asset Management was rebranded Hyperion Asset Management (Hyperion) and with the support of Wilson HTM Ltd the executives acquired an equity stake of fifty percent. As Chief Executive Officer, Managing Director and Chairman of the Investment Committee (1996-July 2012), Pohl grew the company to over $3 billion funds under management.

Pohl led Hyperion during the 2008 financial crisis, from its 24.21% loss to nearly break even in the 2008-2009 fiscal year, enabling the fund to retain its Lonsec investment research product rating of ‘Recommended’.

==== ECP Asset Management ====
In 2012 Pohl sold his stake in Hyperion. In July that year, Pohl founded and is currently chairman of EC Pohl and Co. (ECP), and executive chairman and chief investment officer of subsidiary ECP Asset Management, which has been ranked among the top four fund managers in Australia over the past decade.

In 2019, Pohl’s investment management strategy, was credited with delivering a long-term return of 12.5 percent in comparison to the general market’s 8 percent. In Mercer’s survey of investment performance over the 2020 year, ECP Asset Management performed best of the reviewed mid-caps for the year’s performance with 46.4% growth, and the best over a three-year period at 28.3% growth annually.

In a 2019 profile, the company was listed as having top ranking among 64 asset management firms over the preceding year, and ranked sixth overall for the preceding five years. As with Hyperion under Pohl's directorship, ECP employees are directed to only invest in the fund’s portfolios “… so that there is total alignment of interests. That’s what I think creates a really successful fund management business.”

=== Other affiliations ===
- Freeman, City of London Pohl was granted Freedom of the City of London in 2015.
- Liveryman, Worshipful Company of Loriners, London, UK. Pohl was nominated in 2017 for acceptance into the Worshipful Company of Loriners.

=== Recognition ===
Pohl has been profiled as a leading Australian investment manager by several major industry publications over the past two decades: Independent Financial Advisor (2002) and (2009); The Australian Financial Review (2009) and (2014); AFR Smart Investor (2010); The Financial Standard (2013); Corporate Finance International (2019), and The Australia Business Executive (2019)

Pohl has been twice ranked among the city’s most influential people, in 2014 and 2015.

== Philanthropy ==
=== Pohl Foundation ===
In 2014 Pohl founded the Pohl Foundation, a Deductible Gift Registered charity. The Foundation receives approximately 5% of EC Pohl & Co’s after-tax profit annually. The Foundation’s philanthropy is enhanced by Pohl’s personal charitable support to various causes across the arts, environment, health and well-being sectors, as well as the broader community.

=== Arts ===
Pohl has been a supporter of the Art Gallery of New South Wales’ Conservation Department since 2016, over which time the Pohl Foundation has provided grants to support the restoration of major paintings.

Apart from his major support for AGNSW projects, Pohl was also a Bronze Benefactor of The Arts Centre Gold Coast, now branded Home of the Arts (HOTA) in 2014, 2015 and 2016.

=== Environment ===
Pohl personally supports the Save the Rhino charity. due to the spurious belief in its inherent medicinal properties.

Pohl is also a shareholder in the Olifants River Game Reserve (ORGR), situated in the Balule Nature Reserve, Limpopo Province of the Lowveld, South Africa. ORGR has held nature reserve status since 1983, and after the removal of all fencing in 2005, is now an ecologically integral part of the Greater Kruger National Park/Great Limpopo Transfrontier Park.

Pohl has been a Currumbin Wildlife Sanctuary trustee since 2011, a year after its establishment. The Trustee is the registered charity for the Currumbin Wildlife Sanctuary, and raises funds to care for the sanctuary’s hospital. As trustee, Pohl proposed the establishment of a long-term capital base for the Foundation, and worked with the foundation’s legal team to change the constitution; EC Pohl & Co provided initial seed funding. Following the devastating bushfire season of 2019-2020, colloquially known as Australia’s ‘Black Summer’, EC Pohl & Co devised and held their first Charity Golf Day bushfire appeal in support of Currumbin Wildlife Sanctuary.

=== Higher learning ===
Pohl has been a member of the University Council as well as the Chancellor’s Circle of Bond University, since 2016.

Since its inception in 2010, Pohl has been a supporter of Bond University's annual Indigenous Gala, which raises funds to expand the range of Indigenous scholarships available at the university. In its first ten years, the gala raised over $2.5 million towards Indigenous scholarships, grants and bursaries. In addition, Pohl donates charitable funds annually via the Cancellor’s Circle, which also assists Indigenous students through grants and bursaries.

== Honours ==
Pohl was awarded the Member of the Order of Australia medal in the 2019 Queen's Birthday Honours List (conferred 10 June 2019) for "significant service to the finance sector, and to the community”.”

== Personal life ==
In 1986 Pohl became a naturalised Australian citizen.

He maintains offices in New South Wales and Queensland and lives on the Gold Coast, Queensland.
