= Pol Medina Jr. =

Filipino cartoonist (born 1962)

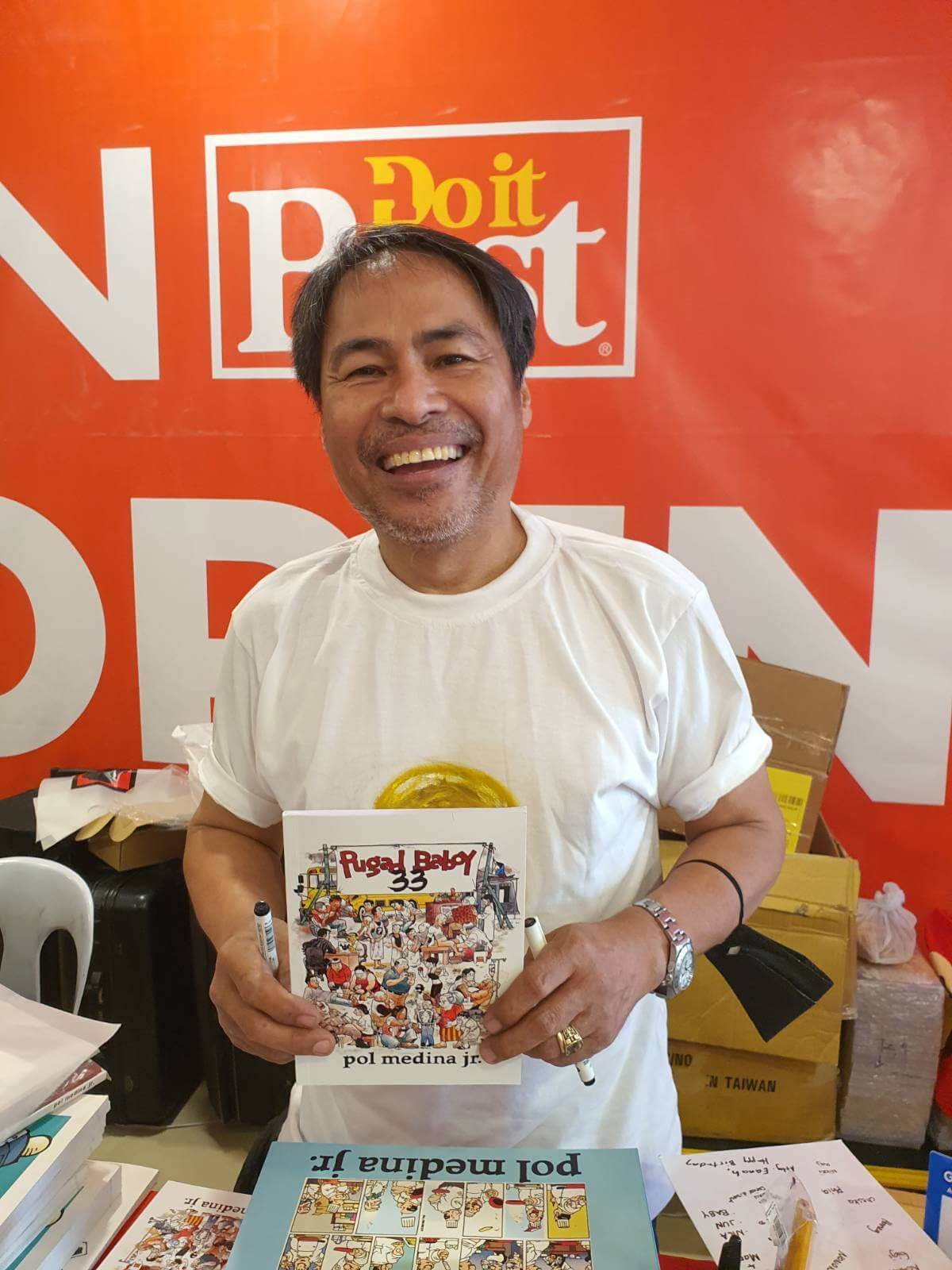
- Pol Medina Jr. at Komiket 2023
- Born: April 6, 1960 (age 66)
- Areas: Writer, Penciller, Inker, Editor, Publisher, Letterer
- Notable works: Pugad Baboy; Blood of the Shinobi

Apolonio "Pol" Medina Jr. (born April 6, 1960) is a Filipino cartoonist best known for his comic strip Pugad Baboy.

== Biography ==
=== Education and early career ===
Pol Medina graduated from the University of Santo Tomas in 1983 with a degree in Architecture. In 1985, a year after securing his professional license, he went to Iraq at the height of the Iran–Iraq War to work for an Italian construction company. It was at this juncture that he experienced "the most maddening" two years of his life.

=== Pugad Baboy ===
In 1986, Medina started scripting and drawing characters for a new cartoon about a community of fatsos and a dog named Polgas. A year later, he worked as an architect for a firm in San Juan, Metro Manila, where he became Chief Architect. On May 18, 1988, Medina debuted Pugad Baboy on the Philippine Daily Inquirer on May 18, 1988. Despite earning only ₱35 per strip, Medina decided to quit his architecture and become a full-time cartoonist. His career picked up when he published his first compilation book The Very Best of Pugad Baboy, but he was only earning a small percentage of the book's gross sales. Pugad Baboy Book 9 became the first book self-published by Medina and his wife. In 1994, Medina published the Pugad Baboy graphic novel Pirata.

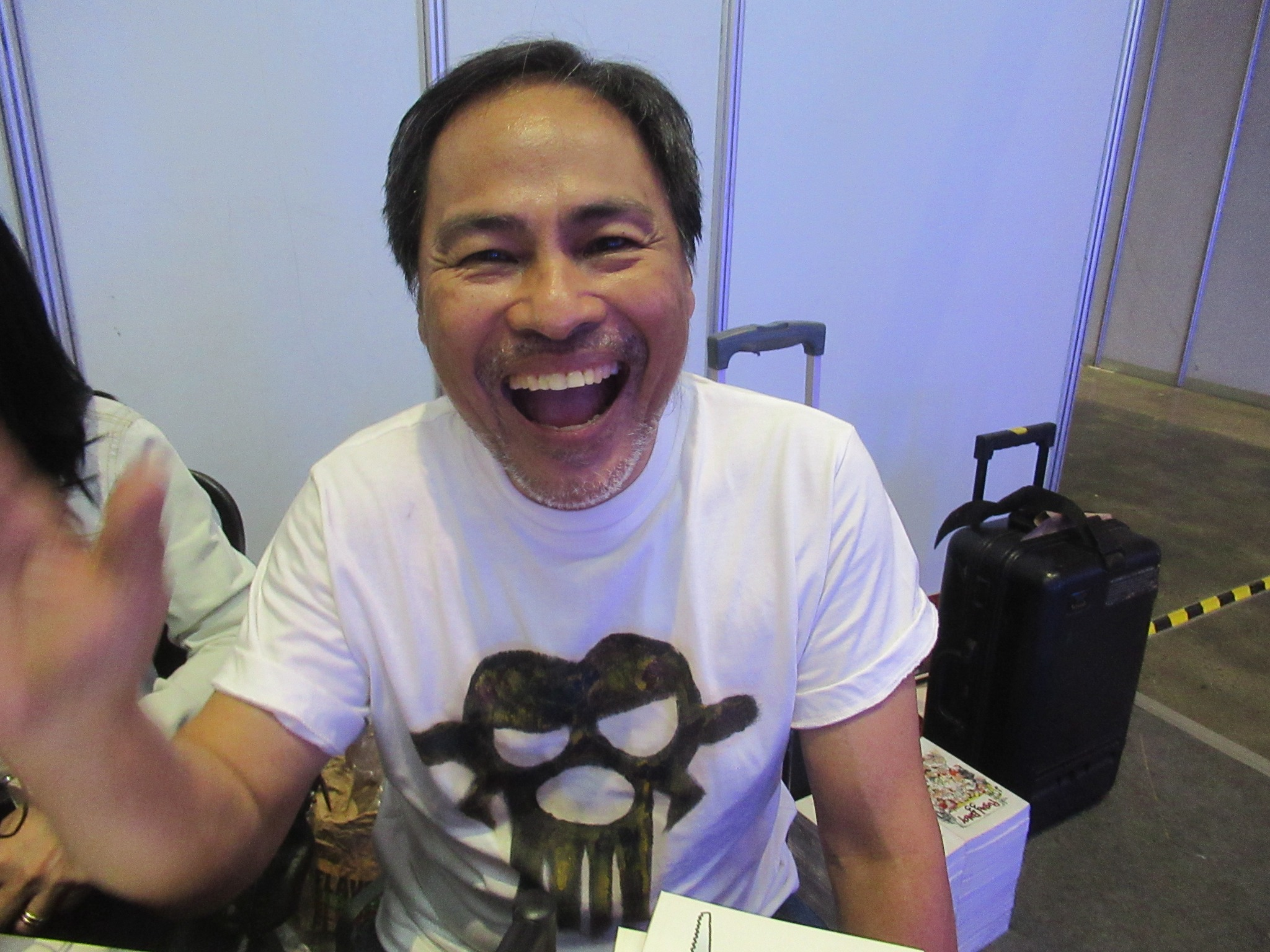
Pol Medina Jr. at Philippine Book Festival

In September 1992, Medina co-founded Pugad Baboy, Inc. with seven other people. The company adopted Ad Astra Per Aspera for its motto, inspired by Harper Lee's Pulitzer Prize-winning novel, To Kill a Mockingbird. Three years later, the company folded when he left in order to pursue a career in the advertising industry. Medina currently has another company, Pol Medina Jr. Novelties, dedicated to merchandise based on the strip, including compilations.

=== Resignation and later career ===
On June 8, 2013, after a 25-year run with Pugad Baboy, Medina formally resigned from the Inquirer after St. Scholastica's College threatened to sue the paper over his June 4 strip, which reportedly lambasted hypocrisy among Christians against homosexuals when certain sectarian schools condone such students among their ranks. Five days later, he transferred to Rappler, continuing Pugad Baboy as a web comic.

Since March 5, 2018, Medina has been working for The Philippine Star and its sister publications Pilipino Star Ngayon and Pang-Masa. In addition, he published his first all-English graphic novel Blood of the Shinobi.
