= Adolf Pohl =

Austrian artist

Adolph Joseph Pohl was an Austrian artist and academic sculptor who lived from 1872 to 1930. He is known for his cast bronze sculptures. Most bronze sculptures are cast in series. Some are numbered with the total number of the series and the individual number of the piece.

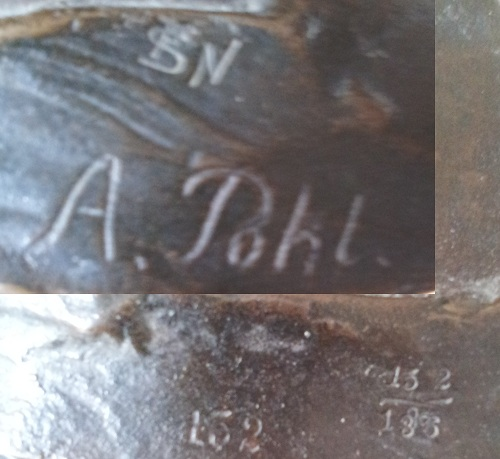
Example of serial numbers, and Pohls Signature

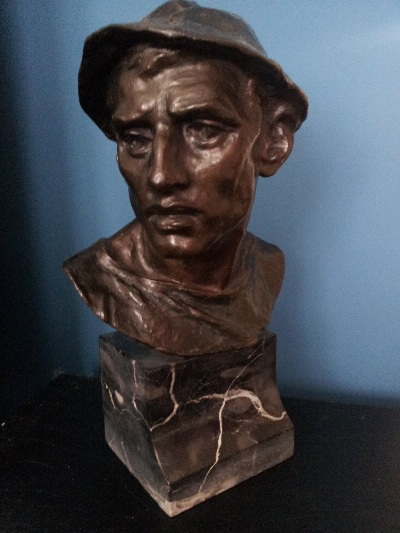
A miner by Pohl. Pohl created several sculptures of miners

== Life and work ==
Pohl was probably born in Vienna, and he probably created sculptures of children's for the side stairs to the side wings of the "Julius-Tandler-Familienzentrum" in Vienna (around or before 1925). He was probably a member of the "Wiener Werkstatte".
