= Alejandro Pol Hurtado =

Venezuelan footballer (born 1990)

Personal information
- Full name: Alejandro Andrés Pol Hurtado
- Date of birth: 29 March 1990 (age 36)
- Place of birth: Caracas, Venezuela
- Height: 1.75 m (5 ft 9 in)
- Positions: Attacking midfielder; winger

Team information
- Current team: FK Nevėžis

Youth career
- 2003–2004: Espanyol

Senior career*
Years	Team	Apps	(Gls)
2007–2008	Monagas		
2008–2009	Universidad Central		
2009–2010	Ternana	0	(0)
2010–2011	Srem	2	(0)
2011–2012	Universidad Central		
2013	Deportivo Petare		
2013–2016	Universidad Central		
2017	Hermandad Gallega		
2018–	FK Nevėžis		
- * Club domestic league appearances and goals as of 1 April 2018

Alejandro Andrés Pol Hurtado (born 29 March 1990) is a Venezuelan footballer playing as midfielder for FK Nevėžis.

== Career ==
Born in Caracas, Alejandro Pol Hurtado had a spell in Spain with RCD Espanyol youth team in 2003–04.

He started his senior career in 2007 playing with Monagas Sport Club playing in the 2007–08 Venezuelan Primera División. In the following season, he moved to Universidad Central de Venezuela FC, usually known as UCV FC or simply Universidad Central.

In 2009, he took his chance again in Europe, this time as a senior, and played with Italian side Ternana Calcio in the 2009–10 Lega Pro Prima Divisione. The following season, he crossed the Adriatic and settled in Serbia where he played with FK Srem in the Serbian First League.

In 2011, he returned to Venezuela, and has been playing back with his former club, Universidad Central. Aside a half-season he spent with Deportivo Petare in the 2012–13 Venezuelan Primera División, he remained with UCV FC from 2011 to 2016.
