= Pole Position (board game) =

Car racing based board game

Pole Position is a board game published in 1989 by Piatnik.

== Contents ==
Pole Position is a game in which each player has three cars which use cards for movement, and play is on a single lane track.

== Reception ==
Brian Walker reviewed Pole Position for Games International magazine, and gave it 4 stars out of 5, and stated that "As the track differs each time the replay value of the game is high. There is considerable scope for strategy and for frustrating the plans of others. All in all, a fine game."

Pole Position was nominated for the 1988 Spiel des Jahres.
