= Heinz-Dieter Pohl =

Austrian linguist and onomatologist

- Born: 6 September 1942 (age 84)

Academic background
- Education: University of Vienna

Academic work
- Discipline: Linguistics, onomatology
- Institutions: University of Klagenfurt

Heinz-Dieter Pohl (born 6 September 1942 in Vienna, Austria) is an Austrian linguist and onomatologist.

== Life ==
Pohl is the son of gymnasium professor Heinz Pohl and Hermine Pohl. He studied classical philology and history at the University of Vienna, later comparative linguistics (Indo-European studies) with a focus on Slavic studies.

From 1967 to 1972 Pohl worked at the University of Vienna's Institute for General and Indo-European Linguistics, and in 1972 moved to the University of Pedagogic Sciences (now known as the University of Klagenfurt) as the professor of general and diachronic linguistics from 1979. Pohl retired on 1 October 2007 but is still active in research and education.

Focus areas of Pohl's later research include the study of placenames, German–Slovenian language contact (and historical-linguistic study of the Carantanian language), Bavarian–Austrian dialectology, Austrian German, ancient historical linguistics, diachronic-comparative study of languages and sociolinguistics.

Pohl is a corresponding member of the Slovenian Academy of Sciences and Arts, the Austrian Board on Geographical Names (AKO) and the Standing Committee on Geographic Names (StAGN). He is also a member of the Society for the Bavarian Language and Dialects (FBSD), which studies Bavarian languages in Germany, Austria and Italy (South Tirol).

From 2000 to 2007 Pohl was a member of the Muttersprache society in Vienna.

== Awards ==
On 10 November 2005 Pohl was awarded the Einspieler Prize of the Council of Carinthian Slovenians (Narodni svet koroških Slovencev) and the Christian Cultural Society (Krščanska kulturna zveza) of the Christian-conservative Advocacy Organisation of Slovenians in Klagenfurt. According to the award committee, the linguists of the university "have greatly helped to ease the view of the Carinthian past and to see bilingualism as somewhat self-explanatory".

== Partial bibliography ==
- Kleine Kärntner Mundartkunde, mit Wörterbuch. Heyn, Klagenfurt 1989, ISBN 3-85366-545-4 (republished in 2007 as Kleines Kärntner Wörterbuch).
- Zur Geschichte und zur Unabhängigkeit Sloweniens und Kroatiens. Hintergründe und historische Daten zum Zerfall Jugoslawiens (Klagenfurter Beiträge zur Sprachwissenschaft 1-18/1991-1992 [1993] 5-60).
- Kärnten – deutsche und slowenische Namen / Koroška – slovenska in nemška imena. In: Österreichische Namenforschung. Zeitschrift der Österreichischen Gesellschaft für Namenforschung, issue 2–3. Year 28. Praesens, 2000, ISSN 1028-1495. Later work: Unsere slowenischen Ortsnamen Mohorjeva/Hermagoras, Klagenfurt 2010, ISBN 978-3-7086-0521-0
- Die Sprache der Kärntner Küche. Hermagoras, Klagenfurt 2004, ISBN 978-3-7086-0026-0.
- Contribution: Slowenisches Erbe in Kärnten und Österreich. Ein Überblick. In: Karl Anderwald, Peter Filzmaier, Karl Hren (ed.): Kärntner Jahrbuch für Politik 2005. Kärntner Druck- und Verlagsgesellschaft, Klagenfurt 2005, ISBN 3-85391-244-3, pp. 127–160 (312 pages [PDF; 1,5 MB]).
- Die österreichische Küchensprache. A lexicon of Austrian culinary specialities (with linguistic explanations). Praesens, Vienna 2007, ISBN 978-3-7069-0452-0.
- With Birgit Schwaner: Das Buch der österreichischen Namen. Ursprung - Eigenart - Bedeutung. Pichler, Vienna 2007, ISBN 978-3-85431-442-4.
- Kleines Kärntner Wörterbuch. 2nd expanded edition. Heyn, Klagenfurt 2007, ISBN 978-3-7084-0243-7 (Original publication: 1989).
- Von Apfelstrudel bis Zwetschkenröster. A small handbook of Austrian culinary linguistics. Ueberreuter, Vienna 2008, ISBN 978-3-8000-7369-6.
- Unsere slowenischen Ortsnamen / Naša slovenska krajevna imena. Mohorjeva / Hermagoras, Klagenfurt 2010, ISBN 978-3-7086-0521-0 (285 pages).
- With V.I. Lewizkij: Geschichte der deutschen Sprache. Winnyzja, Nowa Knyha Verlag 2010 (co-operation and translation from Ukrainian, ISBN 978-966-382-169-6, 254 pages).
- Die Bergnamen der Hohen Tauern (OeAV document #6). Oesterreichischer Alpenverein & Nationalpark Hohe Tauern, Innsbruck 2009 (2nd edition 2011).
- With Willi Seifert: Die Bergnamen der Zillertaler Alpen, ein Gipfelbuch der besonderen Art. Ginzling, Hochgebirgs-Naturpark Zillertaler Alpen 2019 (https://www.naturpark-zillertal.at/; 144 pages, 2nd expanded edition in construction).
