= Joseph Pohl =

German botanical artist

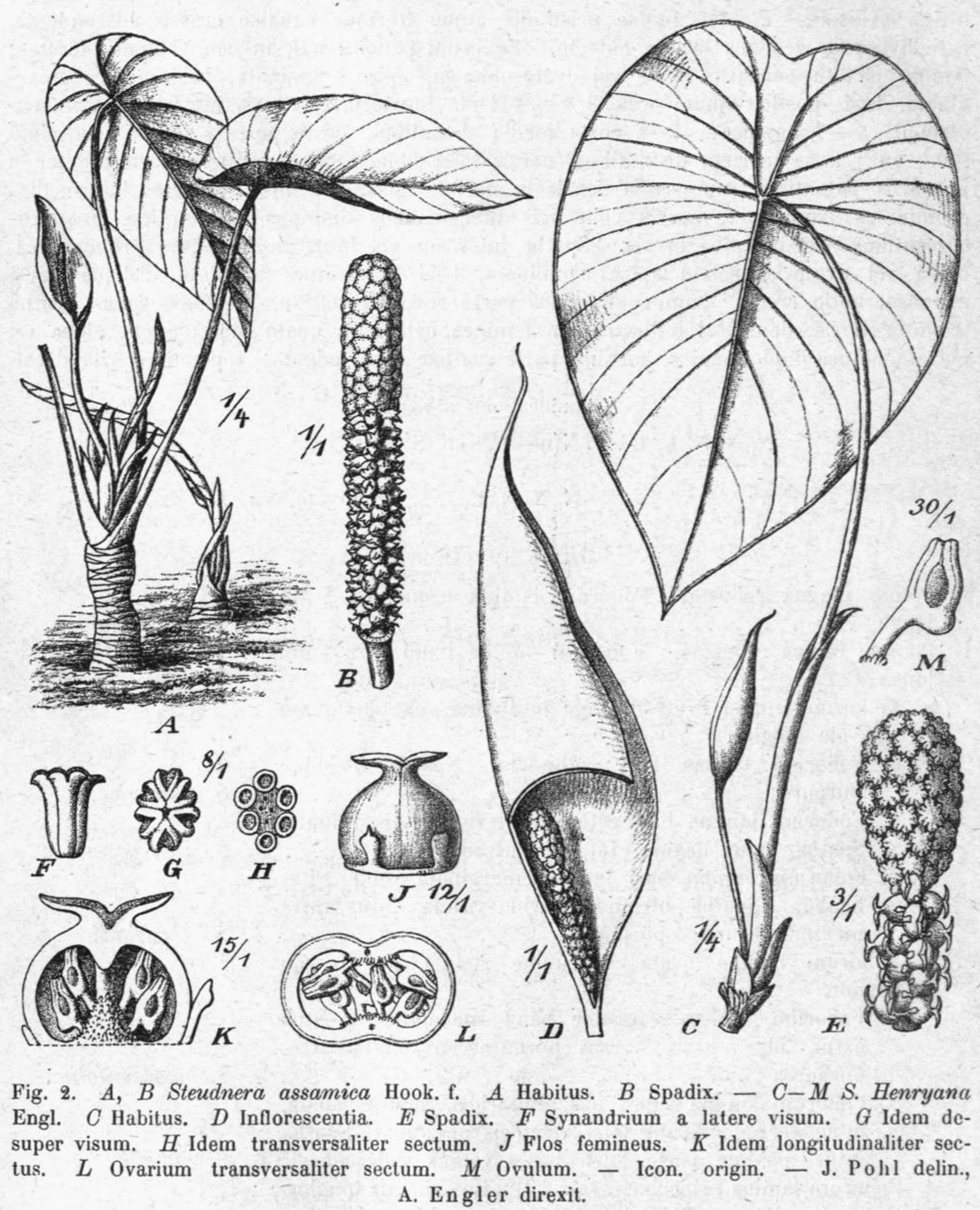
Steudnera assamica Hook.f.

Joseph Pohl (1864–1939) was a German botanical artist born in Breslau (now Wrocław, Poland).

Apprenticed as an engraver, Pohl collaborated with botanist Adolf Engler (1844–1930) for over forty years on several of Engler's important works. Pohl's work is acclaimed for its accuracy and not its artistic quality. His illustrations are considered especially valuable due to destruction of many of the actual plants midst the bombing of the Berlin herbarium during World War II. The following are a list of Engler's major publications that Pohl provided illustrations for:

- Die natürlichen Pflanzenfamilien (1887–1909)
- Das Pflanzenreich (1900 et seq.)
- Die Pflanzenwelt Afrikas (1908–10)
- Monographien afrikanischer Pflanzenfamilien (1898–1904)

He also provided most of the illustrations for the journal Engler's Botanische Jahrbücher, and created orchid illustrations for Carl Friedrich Philipp von Martius' Flora Brasiliensis. Engler named the botanical genus Pohliella from the family Podostemaceae in Pohl's honor.
