= Poll tax (disambiguation) =

A poll tax is a tax of a fixed amount applied to every individual regardless of income.

Poll tax may also refer to:

- Poll tax (Great Britain), officially the "Community Charge", a former system of local taxation in the late 20th century
- Poll taxes in the United States, versions of the poll tax once levied in the United States as a precondition to voting
- New Zealand head tax, a poll tax once levied on Chinese immigrants
- The Jewish poll tax in the Polish-Lithuanian Commonwealth

== See also ==
- Chinese head tax in Canada
- Peasants' Revolt, in 14th-century England, in response to a poll tax
