= Poling, West Virginia =

Poling
- Unincorporated community
- Location within the state of West Virginia Poling (the United States)
- Coordinates: 38°41′20″N 80°26′9″W
- Country: United States
- State: West Virginia
- County: Webster
- Elevation: 1,217 ft (371 m)
- Time zone: UTC-5 (Eastern (EST))
  - Summer (DST): UTC-4 (EDT)
- GNIS ID: 1555384

Poling is an unincorporated community in Webster County, West Virginia, United States.
