= Engleria =

Scientific classification
- Kingdom: Plantae
- Clade: Tracheophytes
- Clade: Angiosperms
- Clade: Eudicots
- Clade: Asterids
- Order: Asterales
- Family: Asteraceae
- Subfamily: Asteroideae
- Tribe: Astereae
- Subtribe: Homochrominae
- Genus: Engleria; O.Hoffmann

Type species
- Engleria africana O.Hoffmann

Synonyms
- Adenogonum Welw. ex Hiern

Genus of flowering plants

Engleria is a genus of African flowering plants in the family Asteraceae.

Species

- Engleria africana O.Hoffm. - Namibia
- Engleria decumbens (Welw. ex Hiern) Hiern - Namibia, Angola
