= Polydore (disambiguation) =

Polydore is a given name, a form of Polydorus. It may refer to:

Given name:

- Polydore Beaufaux (1829–1905), Belgian painter
- Polydore Beaulac (1893–1981), politician in the Quebec, Canada
- Count Maeterlinck Maurice Polydore Marie Bernard (1862–1949), Belgian playwright, poet, and essayist
- Polydore de Keyser (1832–1898), lawyer and Roman Catholic Lord Mayor of London
- Moïse Polydore Millaud (1813–1871), journalist, banker and entrepreneur who founded Le Petit Journal
- Charles Polydore de Mont (1857–1931), Belgian writer and poet
- Frederick Polydore Nodder (1770–1800), English flora and fauna illustrator, copperplate engraver, miniature painter
- Hippolyte and Polydore Pauquet, French brothers and natural history illustrators
- Polydore Plasden, one of the Catholic Forty Martyrs of England and Wales (died 1591)
- Jean Louis Florent Polydore Roux (1792–1833), French painter and naturalist
- Polydore Veirman (1881–1951), Belgian rower who won two Olympic silver medals
- Polydore Vergil (1470–1555), Italian humanist scholar, historian, priest and diplomat, who spent most of his life in England

Music:

- Polydore (Polydorus), opera by the French-Italian composer Jean-Baptiste Stuck

== See also ==
- Polydora (disambiguation)
- Polydor Records, a British record label that operates as part of Universal Music Group
- Polidor, a Crémerie-Restaurant in Paris, France
- Raymond Poulidor (1936–2019), a French professional racing cyclist
