= Maximilian Ritter von Pohl =

German general in the Luftwaffe during World War II

- Born: 15 April 1893
- Died: 26 July 1951 (aged 58)
- Military career
- Allegiance: Weimar Republic, Nazi Germany
- Branch: Luftwaffe
- Rank: General der Flieger
- Commands: Kommandierender General der Luftwaffe in Mittelitalien
- Conflicts: World War II
- Awards: Knight's Cross of the Iron Cross

Maximilian Ritter von Pohl (15 April 1893 – 26 July 1951) was a general in the Luftwaffe during World War II. He was a recipient of the Knight's Cross of the Iron Cross of Nazi Germany.

== Awards and decorations ==
- Knight's Cross of the Iron Cross on 15 June 1944 as General der Flieger and commanding general of the Luftwaffe in Mittelitalien (central Italy)
