= Poling (metallurgy) =

A metallurgical method employed in the purification of copper which contains copper oxide as an impurity and also in the purification of tin which contains tin oxide (stannic oxide or "SnO_{2}") as an impurity. The impure metal, usually in the form of molten blister copper, is placed in an anode furnace for two stages of refining. In the first stage, sulphur and iron are removed by gently blowing air through the molten metal to form iron oxides and sulfur dioxide. The iron oxides are skimmed or poured off the top of the copper and the gaseous sulfur dioxide exits the furnace via the off-gas system. Once the first oxidation stage is complete, the second stage (reduction or poling) begins. This involves using a reducing agent, normally natural gas or diesel (but ammonia, liquid petroleum gas, and naphtha can also be used), to react with the oxygen in the copper oxide to form copper . In the past, freshly cut ("green") trees were used as wooden poles. The sap in these poles acted as the reducing agent. The heat of the copper makes the pole emit wood gas(CO_{2} and H_{2}) that reduces the cuprous oxide to copper.

It was the use of these greenwood poles gave rise to the term "poling."

Care must be taken to avoid removing too much of the oxygen from the anode copper, as this will cause other impurities to change from their oxide to metallic states and they will remain in solid solution in the copper, reduce its conductivity and change its physical properties. Also upper surface can be covered with coke to prevent reoxidation of metal.
