= Pól =

Pól is a masculine given name in both the Irish and Faroese languages.

== Persons with the name ==
- Pól Brennan, (born 1956), Irish, musician.
- Pól Callaghan, Northern Irish, politician.
- Pól Ó Foighil, (1928–2005), Irish, politician and activist for Irish-speaking.
- Pól Jóhannus Justinussen (born 1989), Faroese footballer.
- Pól Thorsteinsson, (born 1973), Faroese, a footballer.

== See also ==
- List of Irish-language given names
- Paul (name)
