= Pohl (disambiguation) =

Pohl is a German surname.

Pohl or Pöhl may also refer to:

- Pohl, Germany, a place in Rhineland-Palatinate
- Pöhl, a place in Saxony, Germany
- Karl Otto Pöhl (1929–2014), German economist
- Hans Pöhl (1876–1930), Estonian politician

== See also ==
- Von Pohl, a surname
