= Pohlmann =

Pohlmann or Pohlman is a surname. Notable people with the surname include:

- Alexander Pohlmann (1865–1952), German politician
- Anthony Pohlmann, German officer
- Dirk Pohlmann (born 1959), German journalist
- Eric Pohlmann (1913–1979), Austrian actor and voice actor
- Floyd Pohlman (1907–1997), American politician from Nebraska
- Hermann Pohlmann (1894–1991), German aerospace engineer
- Ingo Pohlmann (born 1972), German musician and song writer
- Jan-Wilhelm Pohlmann (born 1986), German politician
- Jens Pohlmann (born 1978), German water polo player
- Jonas Pohlmann (born 1996), German politician
- Marcus Pohlmann (born 1950), American political scientist

== See also ==
- Eric Poehlman, American discredited academic
- Harry C. Pohlman Field, baseball field located in Beloit, Wisconsin
- Margarete Poehlmann (1856–1923), German educator and politician
- Robert von Pöhlmann, German ancient historian
