= Deaths in January 2012 =

The following is a list of notable deaths in January 2012.

Entries for each day are listed alphabetically by surname. A typical entry lists information in the following sequence:

- Name, age, country of citizenship and reason for notability, established cause of death, reference (and language of reference, if not English).

== January 2012 ==
=== 1 ===
- Gary Ablett, 46, English footballer (Liverpool, Everton, Birmingham City), non-Hodgkin lymphoma.
- Bob Anderson, 89, British Olympic fencer (1952) and fight choreographer (Star Wars, The Lord of the Rings, The Princess Bride).
- Alfredo Battisti, 86, Italian Roman Catholic prelate, Archbishop of Udine (1972–2000).
- Jorge Andrés Martínez Boero, 38, Argentine motorcycle racer, Dakar Rally crash.
- Elizabeth Brumfiel, 66, American archaeologist.
- Pauli Burman, 78, Finnish journalist and politician.
- Frank Cioffi, 83, American philosopher.
- Diego Cuenca, 84, Spanish footballer.
- Alvin Devane, 88, American soldier.
- Marino Di Teana, 91, Italian Argentine sculptor.
- Hilda Feste, 98, Norwegian woman, murdered.
- Ingeborg Finke-Siegmund, 92, German pianist and piano teacher.
- Anders Frandsen, 51, Danish singer and television presenter.
- Rebecca Fromer, 84, American historian and writer, co-founder of the Magnes Collection of Jewish Art and Life.
- Kiro Gligorov, 94, Macedonian politician, first democratically elected President (1991–1999).
- Jan Groover, 68, American photographer.
- Hermann Guggiari, 87, Paraguayan engineer and sculptor.
- Frank Horwill, 84, British athletics coach.
- Ed Jenkins, 78, American politician, Representative from Georgia (1977–1993).
- Alessandro Liberati, 57, Italian medical researcher, cancer.
- Nay Win Maung, 49, Burmese physician and pro-democracy activist, heart attack.
- Fred Milano, 72, American doo-wop singer (The Belmonts, Dion and the Belmonts), lung cancer.
- Tommy Mont, 89, American college football coach and NFL player, heart failure.
- Marcelle Narbonne, 113, French supercentenarian, oldest European living person.
- Carlos Soria, 63, Argentine politician, Secretary of Intelligence (2002), Governor of Río Negro (since 2011), shot.
- Yafa Yarkoni, 86, Israeli singer, Alzheimer's disease.

=== 2 ===
- Beatriz Bandeira, 102, Brazilian communist, human rights activist, poet and writer.
- Ian Bargh, 76, British-born Canadian jazz pianist, lung cancer.
- Alicia Baro, 93, American human rights activist.
- David W. Barron, 76, British computer scientist.
- Peg Belson, 90, British health activist.
- Ivan Calin, 76, Moldovan politician, Acting President of the Moldovan Parliament (2009).
- William P. Carey, 81, American businessman (W. P. Carey & Co.) and philanthropist.
- Joseph Henry Condon, 76, American computer scientist, engineer and physicist.
- Ioan Drăgan, 46, Romanian footballer (FC Brașov), colorectal cancer.
- Vivi Friedman, 44, Finnish film director, cancer.
- Silvana Gallardo, 58, American actress (MacGyver, Starsky and Hutch, Babylon 5), cancer.
- Liv Godin, 93, Norwegian missionary.
- Yoshiro Hayashi, 89, Japanese golfer.
- Gordon Hirabayashi, 93, American civil rights activist (Hirabayashi v. United States).
- Jim Huber, 67, American sports commentator (CNN, TNT).
- Anatoly Kolesov, 73, Russian wrestler, Olympic gold medalist (1964).
- Howie Koplitz, 73, American baseball player (Detroit Tigers, Washington Senators).
- Helmut Müller-Brühl, 78, German conductor.
- Larry Reinhardt, 63, American rock guitarist (Iron Butterfly, Captain Beyond), liver cirrhosis.
- Alan Rowlands, 82, English pianist.
- Ambjørg Sælthun, 89, Norwegian politician.
- Otto Scrinzi, 93, Austrian journalist and politician.
- Hans Schepers, 81, German Olympic water polo player.
- Paulo Rodrigues, 25, Brazilian footballer, car crash.
- H. Edwin Young, 94, American economist, Chancellor of the University of Wisconsin–Madison (1968–1977).

=== 3 ===
- Charles W. Bailey II, 81, American journalist and novelist (Seven Days in May), Parkinson's disease.
- Gene Bartow, 81, American college basketball coach (UAB, UCLA), stomach cancer.
- Gordon Buttrey, 85, Canadian ice hockey player (Chicago Blackhawks).
- Jack R. Carl, 92, American football, basketball, and track coach.
- Robert L. Carter, 94, American civil rights activist (Sweatt v. Painter) and judge, complications from a stroke.
- Minnie Sue Coleman, 85, American artist.
- Ray Costict, 56, American football player (New England Patriots).
- Miguel Couturier, 61, Mexican actor (Miss Bala, Once Upon a Time in Mexico), cancer.
- Ellen Currie, 81, American writer and advertising executive.
- Willi Entenmann, 68, German football player and coach, heart attack.
- Juan Escudero, 91, Spanish footballer.
- Margaret Feeny, 94, British councillor.
- Fong Fei-fei, 60, Taiwanese singer and actress, lung cancer.
- Lars Lennart Forsberg, 78, Swedish film director.
- Mounir Fourar, 39, Algerian man, one of the tallest men in the world.
- Bryan Hickman, 30, American football player (Cleveland Browns), suicide.
- John David Lewis, 56, American political scientist.
- Winifred Milius Lubell, 97, American illustrator and writer, heart failure.
- Joaquín Martínez, 81, Mexican-born American actor (Jeremiah Johnson, Die Another Day), pancreatic cancer.
- Osamu Matsubara, 94, Japanese businessman, chairman of Books Kinokuniya, heart failure.
- Stepan Oshchepkov, 77, Russian canoeist, Olympic gold medalist (1964).
- Mikhail Romadin, 71, Russian artist.
- Josef Škvorecký, 87, Czech writer and publisher, cancer.
- Miguel Terekhov, 83, Uruguayan-born American ballet dancer and teacher, complications of lung fibrosis.
- Jenny Tomasin, 73, British actress (Upstairs, Downstairs), hypertensive heart disease.
- Wylie Vale, 70, American endocrinologist.
- Vicar, 77, Chilean cartoonist.
- Bob Weston, 64, British guitarist and songwriter (Fleetwood Mac), gastrointestinal hemorrhage. (body found on this date)
- Harold Zirin, 82, American astronomer.

=== 4 ===
- Eve Arnold, 99, American photographer.
- Ruben Ayala, 89, American politician, California State Senator (1974–1998), first elected Mayor of Chino, California (1964–1966).
- Jiří Bárta, 76, Czech pianist and composer.
- Totti Bergh, 76, Norwegian jazz saxophonist.
- C.O.D., American musician, stroke.
- James F. Crow, 95, American geneticist.
- Angela von den Driesch, 77, German archaeologist and veterinarian.
- Stephen M. DuBrul Jr., 82, American businessman.
- Harry Fowler, 85, British character actor.
- Gatewood Galbraith, 64, American lawyer and author, complications from chronic emphysema.
- Sinake Giregire, 74, Papua New Guinean businessman and politician.
- Sir Archibald Glenn, 100, Australian industrialist, Chancellor of La Trobe University.
- Patricia Mather, 88, Australian zoologist.
- Kerry McGregor, 37, British singer and reality contestant (The X Factor), bladder cancer.
- Bob McKenzie, 83, Australian football player.
- Kalpana Mohan, 65, Indian actress.
- Carmen Naranjo, 83, Costa Rican novelist, poet and essayist, cancer.
- Hisako Ōishi, 75, Japanese politician, member of the House of Councillors, respiratory failure.
- Rod Robbie, 83, Canadian architect.
- Xaver Unsinn, 82, German Olympic ice hockey player and coach.
- Hans Wahli, 84, Swiss Olympic athlete.
- David Wheeler, 86, American theatrical director.

=== 5 ===
- Richard Alf, 59, American businessman, co-founder and chairman of San Diego Comic-Con, pancreatic cancer.
- François-Marie Algoud, 91, French royalist and author.
- Selwyn Baptiste, 75, Trinidadian-born British musician and festival organiser.
- Sigurður Bjarnason, 96, Icelandic politician and diplomat.
- Don Carter, 85, American professional bowler, complication from pneumonia and emphysema.
- Samson H. Chowdhury, 86, Bangladeshi businessman.
- George Dargo, 76, American legal scholar, skin cancer.
- Mirtha Dermisache, 71, Argentine artist.
- Hilmar Duerbeck, 63, German astronomer.
- Idwal Fisher, 76, Welsh rugby player.
- Thelma Forbes, 101, Canadian politician.
- Hikaru Hayashi, 80, Japanese composer.
- Frank Ackerman Hill, 92, American U.S. Air Force officer, commander of the 33rd Air Division.
- Frederica Sagor Maas, 111, American silent film screenwriter (The Plastic Age), playwright, memoirist and author.
- Isaac Díaz Pardo, 91, Spanish artist.
- Amit Saigal, 46, Indian rock magazine publisher, concert promoter and musician, drowned.
- Alexander Sizonenko, 52, Russian basketball player, world's tallest person (1991).

=== 6 ===
- Kenneth Andrews, 90, British historian.
- Louise Gibson Annand, 96, Scottish artist.
- James R. Arnold, 88, American space scientist.
- Tom Ardolino, 56, American drummer (NRBQ).
- Roger Boisjoly, 73, American aerospace engineer, anticipated the Space Shuttle Challenger disaster, cancer.
- Azer Bülbül, 44, Turkish singer and actor, heart attack.
- Harlin Butterley, 84, Australian Anglican priest and Dean of Hobart from 1972 to 1980.
- Gabriel Cadis, 60, Israeli attorney, chairman of the Jaffa Orthodox Church Association, stabbed.
- John Celardo, 93, American comic strip artist (Tarzan, Buz Sawyer).
- Harry Fearnley, 88, English footballer.
- Bob Holness, 83, South African-born British quiz show host and actor (Blockbusters).
- Eleutherios Katsaitis, 82, Greek-born British Orthodox hierarch, Auxiliary Bishop of Archdiocese of Great Britain (1987–1994), smothered.
- W. Francis McBeth, 78, American composer.
- Frank James McGarr, 90, American former senior (and chief) judge of the District Court for the Northern District of Illinois.
- Basil Payne, 88, Irish poet.
- Ellen Pence, 63, American sociologist and social activist, creator of the Duluth Domestic Abuse Intervention Project, breast cancer.
- Thomas Virgil Pittman, 95, American senior (former chief) judge of the District Court for the Southern District of Alabama and judge for the Middle District of Alabama.
- Sybil Plumlee, 100, American teacher and police officer.
- Spike Pola, 97, Australian football player.
- John Pollock, 87, English author.
- Louis Rech, 85, Italian-born Luxembourgish politician, Mayor of Dudelange (1985–1993).
- Clive Shell, 64, Welsh international rugby player.

=== 7 ===
- Ibrahim Aslan, 77, Egyptian novelist and short story writer, heart failure.
- Tony Blankley, 63, British-born American commentator, newspaper editor and child actor, stomach cancer.
- Karen Ramey Burns, 64, American forensic anthropologist.
- Glenn Cox, 80, American baseball player (Kansas City Athletics).
- Bert Daikeler, 83, American politician, member of the Pennsylvania House of Representatives.
- George Gabin, 80, American artist and art educator.
- Francella Mary Griggs, 91, American nun, advocated for federal recognition of the Confederated Tribes of Siletz Indians.
- George Livingston, 78, American politician, first elected black mayor of Richmond, California (1985–1993), diabetes.
- Hideaki Nitani, 81, Japanese actor (Tokyo Drifter), pneumonia.
- Charlie Pawsey, 88, English rugby league player.
- Henri Puppo, 98, French cyclist.
- Herbert Wilf, 80, American mathematician.

=== 8 ===
- Jan Håkan Åberg, 95, Swedish organist and composer.
- Dave Alexander, 73, American blues singer and pianist, suicide by gunshot.
- Artax, 17, American Champion Thoroughbred racehorse, winner of the 1999 Breeders' Cup Sprint, Carter Handicap and Vosburgh Stakes.
- Franz Berger, 71, Austrian Olympic wrestler.
- Andrea Bosic, 92, Italian actor.
- Françoise Christophe, 88, French actress.
- Herb Clarke, 84, American television weatherman (WCAU-TV), NATAS Governor's Award winner (2007), Alzheimer's disease.
- Robert M. Colleary, 82, American writer.
- Franz Dorfer, 61, Austrian Olympic boxer (1976).
- Gunnar Dyrberg, 90, Danish resistance fighter, head of Holger Danske (1943–1945).
- Edarem, 79, American television presenter and internet celebrity.
- Israel Getzler, 91, Jewish-British historian.
- T. J. Hamblin, 68, British haematologist, cancer.
- Svetlana Kharitonova, 79, Russian actress, after long illness.
- Dmitry Machinsky, 74, Russian archaeologist.
- John Madin, 87, English architect.
- Charles Morris, 85, British politician, MP for Manchester Openshaw (1963–1983).
- Clarence C. Pope, 81, American prelate, Episcopal Bishop of Fort Worth (1986–1994).
- Graham Rathbone, 69, Welsh footballer, dementia.
- Bernhard Schrader, 80, German theoretical chemist.
- Alexis Weissenberg, 82, Bulgarian-born French pianist.

=== 9 ===
- Zubair Ahmed, Bangladeshi student, beaten.
- Rebeca Anchondo Fernández, 85, Mexican politician.
- Tubby Bacon, 81, American baseball team owner (Milwaukee Braves) and oenophile.
- Louis Boekhout, 92, Dutch-born Canadian painter.
- Paul Rice Camp, 92, American academic.
- Ron Caron, 82, Canadian ice hockey administrator, General Manager of the St. Louis Blues (1983–1993, 1996).
- Ernie Carson, 74, American jazz musician.
- Jock Collaquo, 77, Hong Kong hockey player.
- Brian Curvis, 74, Welsh former Commonwealth welterweight champion boxer, leukaemia.
- Alex DeCroce, 75, American politician, New Jersey General Assembly Minority Leader (since 2004).
- Bill Dickie, 82, Scottish football administrator.
- Ruth Fernández, 92, Puerto Rican contralto and politician, Senator (1973–1981).
- Takashi Fujinama, 80, Japanese translator, pneumonia.
- Bridie Gallagher, 87, Irish singer.
- Augusto Gansser-Biaggi, 101, Swiss geologist.
- Floro Garrido, 59, Spanish soccer player and manager, multiple organ failure.
- Francis Golffing, 101, Austrian-American poet, essayist, teacher, and translator.
- Christian-Joseph Guyonvarc'h, 85, French philologist, specializing in Celtic studies.
- Junsaku Koizumi, 87, Japanese painter and pottery artist, pneumonia.
- Mae Laborde, 102, American actress (Pineapple Express, It's Always Sunny in Philadelphia).
- Vern McGrew, 82, American Olympic athlete.
- Robert Nelson, 81, American filmmaker, cancer.
- John Both Puok, 48, South Sudanese politician.
- William G. Roll, 85, American psychologist and parapsychologist.
- Malam Bacai Sanhá, 64, Guinea-Bissauan politician, President (1999–2000; since 2009).
- Larry Solway, 83, Canadian radio personality and author.
- László Szekeres, 90, Hungarian physician.
- Pyotr Vasilevsky, 55, Belarusian football player and coach.
- Aldo Zenhäusern, 60, Swiss Olympic ice hockey player (1976).

=== 10 ===
- Fred Bateman, 74, American economic historian.
- Paul Antoine Bohoun Bouabré, 54, Ivorian politician and economist, kidney problems.
- Alfonso de Bourbon, 79, American claimant of Spanish royalty, traffic accident.
- Jim Congrove, 65, American politician, heart complications.
- Maurice Dantin, 82, American attorney and politician.
- Azeem Daultana, 32, Pakistani politician, Member of the National Assembly, road accident.
- José Freire de Oliveira Neto, 83, Brazilian Roman Catholic prelate, Bishop of Mossoró (1984–2004).
- Vince Gibson, 78, American college football coach.
- Jack Heron, 85, American college basketball coach (Sacramento State University).
- Kyra T. Inachin, 43, German historian.
- Lila Kaye, 82, British actress.
- Isi Metzstein, 83, German-born British architect.
- Jean Pigott, 87, Canadian politician and businesswoman, MP for Ottawa—Carleton (1976–1979).
- Pir of Pagaro VII, 83, Pakistani politician and spiritual leader, heart attack.
- Cliff Portwood, 74, English footballer and singer, lung disease.
- Alfred Pyka, 77, German footballer.
- Mary Raftery, 54, Irish journalist (States of Fear).
- Takao Sakurai, 70, Japanese boxer, Olympic gold medalist (1964), esophageal cancer.
- Gevork Vartanian, 87, Soviet intelligence agent, Hero of the Soviet Union.

=== 11 ===
- Fatima al-Aqel, 54, Yemeni human rights activist.
- Sarah E. Beard, 90, American medical researcher.
- Richard Bruno, 87, American costume designer (Raging Bull, Goodfellas, The Color of Money), kidney failure.
- Frank Cook, 76, British politician, MP for Stockton North (1983–2010), lung cancer.
- Bohumil Golián, 81, Slovak volleyball player, Olympic silver (1964) and bronze (1968) medalist.
- Gilles Jacquier, 43, French journalist, 2003 recipient of the Albert Londres Prize, grenade attack.
- Edgar Kaiser Jr., 69, Canadian businessman and philanthropist, owner of the Denver Broncos (1981–1984).
- V. Madhusudhana Rao, 88, Indian film director.
- Mario Maranzana, 82, Italian actor and voice actor.
- Chuck Metcalf, 81, American double-bassist.
- Wally Osterkorn, 83, American basketball player.
- Steven Rawlings, 49, British astrophysicist.
- Ivor Rees, 85, Welsh Anglican prelate, Bishop of St David's (1991–1995).
- Mostafa Ahmadi Roshan, 32, Iranian nuclear scientist, car bomb.
- Christoffer Selbekk, 72, Norwegian businessman and ski jumper.
- Colm Tucker, 59, Irish rugby union player.
- David Whitaker, 80, English composer and songwriter.
- Ross Wightman, 82, New Zealand rugby union player.

=== 12 ===
- Bjørn G. Andersen, 87, Norwegian geologist.
- John Beech Austin, 94, British aviator.
- Sadao Bekku, 89, Japanese composer, pneumonia.
- Glenda Dickerson, 66, American theatre director.
- Brian C. Downey, 61, Canadian politician.
- Basil Gordon, 80, American mathematician.
- Reginald Hill, 75, British crime writer (Dalziel and Pascoe).
- Natalee Holloway, 18 (in 2005), American student, missing since 2005. (declared legally dead on this date)
- Bill Janklow, 72, American politician, Attorney General (1975–1979) and Governor of South Dakota (1979–1987, 1995–2003); U.S. Representative (2003–2004), brain cancer.
- Shiv Kumari of Kotah, 95, Indian Hindu royal.
- MS-1, 55, Mexican professional wrestler, car accident.
- Charles H. Price II, 80, American businessman and diplomat.
- Hannes Råstam, 56, Swedish journalist.
- Rosalind Runcie, 79, British pianist, widow of Robert Runcie.
- Rubina Shergill, 29, Indian television actress.
- Jim Stanley, 76, American football coach (Oklahoma State Cowboys), cancer.
- John G. Watkins, 98, American psychologist.
- Jorge Wilmot, 83, Mexican potter.

=== 13 ===
- Anton Blom, 87, Norwegian journalist.
- Rauf Denktaş, 87, Cypriot politician, founder and first president of the Turkish Republic of Northern Cyprus, multiple organ failure.
- Guido Dessauer, 96, German paper engineer and art collector.
- Dilys Elwyn-Edwards, 93, Welsh composer.
- Felipe Fernández, 78, Argentine basketball player.
- Morgan Jones, 83, American actor (The Twilight Zone).
- Lefter Küçükandonyadis, 86, Turkish Olympic footballer (Fenerbahçe) and coach, pneumonia.
- Oscar Valentín Leal Caal, 41, Guatemalan politician, Congressman (since 2008), shot.
- Artie Levine, 86, American boxer.
- Billie Love, 88, British actress and photographer.
- Armand Mercier, 78, American politician, Mayor of Lowell, Massachusetts (2004–2006).
- Curt Meyer-Clason, 101, German writer and translator.
- Miljan Miljanić, 81, Serbian footballer, coach and administrator.
- Abdollah Mojtabavi, 87, Iranian wrestler.
- Richard Threlkeld, 74, American television journalist (CBS News), traffic collision.
- Bob Wright, 76, American biographer and politician, Chairman of the Utah Republican Party (1977–1979), Alzheimer's disease.
- Andrzej Krzysztof Wróblewski, 76, Polish journalist.

=== 14 ===
- Howard H. Bell, 98, American historian.
- Charles E. Bishop, 90, American academic.
- Janey Buchan, 85, Scottish politician, MEP for Glasgow (1979–1994).
- Anthony J. Calio, 82, American physicist and businessman, congestive heart failure and lung cancer.
- Mircea Ciumara, 68, Romanian politician, Minister of Finance (1996–1997), cancer.
- Joseph T. Collins, 72, American herpetologist.
- Carol Creiniceanu, 72, Romanian football player.
- Ekuikui IV, 98, Angolan king of Bailundo, disease.
- Dan Evins, 76, American entrepreneur, founder of Cracker Barrel Old Country Store.
- Robbie France, 52, British drummer (Skunk Anansie, Diamond Head, UFO), ruptured aorta.
- Charles Howard, 87, Australian Roman Catholic leader, Superior General of the Marist Brothers (1985–1993).
- Pearse Hutchinson, 84, Irish broadcaster and writer, member of Aosdána.
- Arfa Karim, 16, Pakistani student, world's youngest Microsoft Certified Professional (2004–2008), idiopathic epilepsy seizures.
- Lasse Kolstad, 90, Norwegian actor.
- Antonio Mistrorigo, 99, Italian Roman Catholic prelate, Bishop of Treviso (1958–1988).
- Giampiero Moretti, 71, Italian racing driver, winner of the 24 Hours of Daytona (1998), founder of Momo.
- Kaoru Nishimoto, 88, Japanese shogi player, pneumonia.
- Mila Parély, 94, French actress.
- Finn Pedersen, 86, Danish Olympic gold medal-winning (1948) rower.
- Dame Lesley Strathie, 56, British civil servant, Permanent Secretary to HM Revenue and Customs (2008–2011), cancer.
- Txillardegi, 82, Spanish writer and politician.
- Rosy Varte, 88, French actress.
- Zelemkhan Zangiyev, 37, Russian footballer.

=== 15 ===
- Mika Ahola, 37, Finnish enduro rider, motorcycle crash.
- Richard Bader, 80, Canadian quantum chemist.
- Gelareh Bagherzadeh, 30, Iranian student, shot.
- Ed Derwinski, 85, American politician, U.S. Representative from Illinois (1959–1983); United States Secretary of Veterans Affairs (1989–1992), merkel cell carcinoma.
- Claes Egnell, 95, Swedish sport shooter and Olympic silver medal-winning (1952) pentathlete.
- Manuel Fraga, 89, Spanish politician, President of the Xunta of Galicia (1990–2005), founder of the People's Party and co-father of Spanish Constitution, heart failure.
- Sir Robert Freer, 88, British military officer, Deputy Commander of RAF Strike Command (1978–1980).
- Carlo Fruttero, 85, Italian writer.
- Ben Hana, 54, New Zealand vagrant.
- Eisuke Hinode, 70, Japanese politician, member of the House of Councillors, gall bladder cancer.
- Eduard Ivanov, 73, Soviet ice hockey player, World and Olympic champion.
- Samuel Jaskilka, 92, American Marine Corps general, pneumonia.
- Matteo La Grua, 97, Italian priest and exorcist.
- Pirkko Länsivuori, 85, Finnish Olympic sprinter.
- Michael Mussa, 67, American economist, heart failure.
- Samuel B. Nunez Jr., 81, American politician, President of the Louisiana State Senate (1983–1988; 1990–1996).
- Ib Spang Olsen, 90, Danish cartoonist and author, recipient of the Hans Christian Andersen Award.
- Chris Pavlou, 72, Australian football player.
- Jerry Poteet, 75, American martial arts instructor.
- Rafael Rincón González, 89, Venezuelan musician.
- Jack Roberts, 58, American climber, fall.
- Hulett C. Smith, 93, American politician, Governor of West Virginia (1965–1969).
- Peter Veness, 27, Australian journalist, brain cancer.
- Homai Vyarawalla, 98, Indian photojournalist, first Indian woman to work as a photojournalist.
- Victor Yngve, 91, American linguist.

=== 16 ===
- Mohammed al-Awwad, 53–54, Syrian general, shot.
- Joe Bygraves, 80, Jamaican born British former British Empire heavyweight champion boxer.
- Juan Carlos, 66, Spanish footballer.
- Jimmy Castor, 71, American funk and R&B saxophonist ("Troglodyte (Cave Man)"), heart failure.
- L. Ted Coneybeare, 86, Canadian TV producer and educational consultant.
- Mike Current, 66, American football player (Denver Broncos, Miami Dolphins, Tampa Bay Buccaneers), apparent suicide by gunshot.
- Efron Etkin, 59, Israeli actor and voice actor, cancer.
- Sigursteinn Gíslason, 43, Icelandic football player and manager, cancer.
- Pierre Goubert, 96, French historian.
- Lorna Kesterson, 86, American newspaper editor and journalist (Henderson Home News), Mayor of Henderson, Nevada (1985–1993).
- Dave Lee, 64, British comedian, cancer.
- Gustav Leonhardt, 83, Dutch harpsichordist and conductor.
- David Phiri, 74, Zambian businessman, Governor of the Bank of Zambia.
- The Senator, c. 3500, American pond cypress tree, largest in the world, fire.
- Valentine Rusantsov, 72, Russian hierarch, Primate of the Russian Orthodox Autonomous Church (1996–2012).

=== 17 ===
- Mukarram Khan Atif, Pakistani journalist and reporter, shot.
- Kearney Barton, 80, American record producer.
- Frank A. Camm, 89, American military engineer, cancer.
- Colin Campbell, 80, Canadian Roman Catholic prelate, Bishop of Antigonish (1986–2002).
- F. Elwood Davis, 96, American lawyer.
- Aengus Fanning, 69, Irish journalist, editor of the Sunday Independent, cancer.
- Janet Folkes, 52, English academic, cancer.
- Carlos Guirao, 57, Spanish musician.
- Julius Meimberg, 95, German air force pilot (Luftwaffe), recipient of the Knight's Cross of the Iron Cross.
- Johnny Otis, 90, American R&B singer-songwriter.
- Piet Römer, 83, Dutch actor (Baantjer).
- Mohamed Rouicha, 61, Moroccan folk singer.
- R. W. Schambach, 85, American evangelist, heart failure.
- Marty Springstead, 74, American baseball umpire, heart attack.
- Tom Tellefsen, 80, Norwegian actor.
- Uncle Chichi, 24–26, American dog, unofficial world's oldest dog (2011–2012).

=== 18 ===
- Karen Brazell, 73, American academic, professor and translator of Japanese.
- Sir Tom Cowie, 89, British entrepreneur.
- Thérèse Delpech, 63, French nuclear proliferation expert, apparent heart attack.
- Carlos Figueroa, 80, Spanish Olympic equestrian.
- Ray Finch, 97, British studio potter.
- Tom Gilmartin, 87, American politician.
- Mel Goldstein, 66, American television meteorologist (WTNH), multiple myeloma.
- Anthony Gonsalves, 84, Indian film music composer.
- Georg Lassen, 96, German naval officer, World War II U-boat commander.
- Joseph Noiret, 84, French poet.
- Yuri Rasovsky, 67, American writer and producer, esophageal cancer.
- Giuseppe Vedovato, 99, Italian politician.

=== 19 ===
- Peter Åslin, 49, Swedish ice hockey player, Olympic bronze medal-winner (1988), stroke.
- Giancarlo Bigazzi, 71, Italian composer ("Gloria", "Self Control", "No Me Ames").
- Sarah Burke, 29, Canadian freestyle skier, world champion (2005), cardiac arrest following skiing accident.
- Maurice Casey, 88, New Zealand judge.
- Elena Catena, 91, Spanish academic and feminist.
- Rudi van Dantzig, 78, Dutch choreographer.
- Giovanni De Andrea, 83, Italian Roman Catholic prelate, vice-president of Labour Office of the Apostolic See (1989–2007).
- Peter de Francia, 90, British artist.
- Charles Fecher, 94, American author.
- Colonel Stone Johnson, 93, American civil rights activist.
- Beverly McDermott, 85, American casting director (Cocoon, Scarface, Lenny).
- Gene Methvin, 77, American journalist and magazine editor.
- Patrick Geoffrey O'Neill, 87, British academic.
- Gert Puzicha, 67, German boxer.
- Winston Riley, 65, Jamaican reggae musician and producer, complications of shooting.
- On Sarig, 85, Israeli children's book author.
- Errol Scorcher, 55, Jamaican reggae disc jockey, ruptured blood vessel.
- Richard Sheirer, 65, American public servant, officer-in-charge of the rescue and recovery effort after the September 11 attacks, pulmonary edema.
- Gilbert Temmerman, 83, Belgian politician, MP (1971–1989), Mayor of Ghent (1989–1994), Minister of State.
- Jacqueline Grennan Wexler, 85, American Roman Catholic nun and university president.

=== 20 ===
- Enenche Akogwu, 31, Nigerian journalist and cameraman, shot.
- John F. Baker Jr., 66, American Medal of Honor recipient.
- Billy 'Silver Dollar' Baxter, 85, American film producer.
- Ruthilde Boesch, 94, Austrian singer.
- Edna Bourque, 96, Canadian volunteer.
- Larry Butler, 69, American music producer.
- Stella Cunliffe, 95, British statistician.
- Peter Collins Dorsey, 80, American jurist.
- Lucy Faulkner, 87, Northern Irish journalist.
- Dolores Guinness, 75, German baroness and socialite.
- Etta James, 73, American blues singer ("At Last"), leukemia.
- Nikhat Kazmi, 53, Indian film critic, breast cancer.
- Ioannis Kefalogiannis, 79, Greek politician, MP (1958–1964; 1974–2004) and Minister of the Interior (1992–1993).
- John Levy, 99, American jazz double-bassist and manager.
- Bill Mardo, 88, American sportswriter, Parkinson's disease.
- M. I. Markose, 89, Indian politician.
- Marion Mathie, 86, British actress (Lolita).
- Mario Pastega, 95, American businessman and philanthropist.
- Jiří Raška, 70, Czech ski jumper, Olympic gold medalist (1968), heart disease.
- Margaret Renwick, 88, Canadian politician.
- Alejandro Rodriguez, 93, American psychiatrist and academic.
- Robert Fortune Sanchez, 77, American Roman Catholic prelate, Archbishop of Santa Fe (1977–1993), Alzheimer's disease.
- Edna Sheen, 67, American makeup artist (Philadelphia, Courage Under Fire, Akeelah and the Bee).
- Patrick Shovelton, 92, British civil servant and obituarist.
- Dudley Thompson, 95, Jamaican politician and diplomat.
- Michael Welsh, 85, English politician, Member of Parliament (1979–1992).
- Walter Whitehurst, 77, English footballer.

=== 21 ===
- Daniel Alba, 71, Mexican Olympic wrestler.
- Bilal al-Berjawi, 27, Lebanese terrorist, drone strike.
- Saud Nasser Al-Saud Al-Sabah, 68, Kuwaiti royal, diplomat and politician.
- Stan Austman, 75, Canadian curler, cancer.
- Albert Baskakov, 83, Russian physicist.
- J. R. Boone, 86, American football player (Chicago Bears).
- Roy John Britten, 92, American molecular biologist.
- Cliff Chambers, 90, American baseball player.
- Chea Soth, 83, Cambodian politician.
- Vincenzo Consolo, 78, Italian writer.
- Emmanuel Cooper, 73, British potter and writer.
- Ernie Gregory, 90, English footballer.
- Gerre Hancock, 77, American organist.
- Troy Herriage, 81, American baseball player (Kansas City Athletics).
- Jonathan Idema, 55, American scam artist, complications from AIDS.
- Eiko Ishioka, 72, Japanese costume designer (Bram Stoker's Dracula, Immortals, The Cell), Oscar winner (1993), pancreatic cancer.
- Irena Jarocka, 65, Polish singer.
- John D. Lowry, 79, Canadian film restorer.
- Una Mulzac, 88, American bookseller.
- Salma Mumtaz, 85, Pakistani actress, diabetes.
- Jeffrey Ntuka, 26, South African footballer, stabbed.
- Vasco Ramires Sr., 72, Portuguese Olympic equestrian.
- Tang Xiaodan, 101, Chinese film director.
- Jodie-Anne White, 44, Australian dancer and choreographer, artistic director of the Ballet Theatre of Queensland, cancer.
- Slavko Ziherl, 66, Slovenian psychiatrist and politician.

=== 22 ===
- Massimo Baistrocchi, 69, Italian diplomat and writer, Ambassador to Namibia (2001–2004), heart attack.
- Sarah Cullen, 62, British radio and television journalist.
- Jesus Elbinias, 82, Filipino judge.
- Roy Ewans, 94, British aerodynamicist.
- Alfred Gescheidt, 85, American photographer, cancer.
- Earle R. Gister, 77, American acting teacher.
- Rita Gorr, 85, Belgian opera singer.
- André Green, 84, French psychoanalyst.
- Jim Irwin, 77, American sportscaster (WTMJ), voice of the Green Bay Packers, complications from kidney cancer.
- Moisés Kaiman, 97, Polish-born Mexican rabbi.
- Sir Simon Marsden, 63, British photographer.
- Andy Musser, 74, American sportscaster (Philadelphia Phillies, Philadelphia 76ers).
- Joe Paterno, 85, American college football coach (Penn State Nittany Lions), lung cancer.
- Yauhen Shatokhin, 64, Belarusian painter and political activist.
- Pierre Sudreau, 92, French politician, inspired The Little Prince.
- Clarence Tillenius, 98, Canadian artist and conservationist.
- Dick Tufeld, 85, American voice actor and announcer, voice of Robot B-9 on Lost in Space.

=== 23 ===
- David Atkinson, 71, British politician, MP for Bournemouth East (1977–2005), bowel cancer.
- Jeanne Quint Benoliel, 92, American nurse.
- Viviana Bontacchio, 52, Italian football player.
- Amol Bose, 69, Bangladeshi actor, heart attack.
- Wesley E. Brown, 104, American jurist, senior (former chief) judge of the District Court for Kansas (since 1962).
- Anthony Capo, 52, American mobster-turned-informant (DeCavalcante crime family), heart attack.
- Marge Carey, 73, British union leader, President of USDAW (1997–2006), motor neurone disease.
- Arne Christiansen, 85, Norwegian judge.
- Libby Clark, 94–95, American journalist, Alzheimer's disease.
- Ovidiu Constantinescu, 79, Romanian mycologist.
- Marcel De Boodt, 85, Belgian academic.
- Erik Haaest, 76, Danish journalist and author.
- Jugal Kishore, 98, Indian physician.
- Maurice Meisner, 80, American historian.
- Miloš Pojar, 71, Czech author and diplomat.
- Bingham Ray, 57, American independent film executive, complications from strokes.
- Bill Robb, 84, Australian politician, member of the New South Wales Legislative Assembly for Miranda (1978–1984).
- Gerhard Schröder, 90, German television executive.
- Slacker, British electronic music producer.
- Stig Vig, 63, Swedish singer (Dag Vag).

=== 24 ===
- Kurt Adolff, 90, German racing driver.
- Theodoros Angelopoulos, 76, Greek film director, hit by motorcycle.
- Sukumar Azhikode, 85, Indian writer, critic, and orator, cancer.
- Jane Bashara, 56, American marketing manager, strangulation.
- James C. Bliss, 78, American electrical engineer and entrepreneur.
- Antony Barrington Brown, 84, British designer, photographer and explorer.
- James Farentino, 73, American actor (Dynasty, ER, Melrose Place), sequelae from hip fracture.
- J. Joseph Garrahy, 81, American politician, Governor of Rhode Island (1977–1985).
- Vadim Glowna, 70, German actor and film director.
- Paul S. Goodman, 74, American organizational theorist.
- Arild Haaland, 92, Norwegian philosopher.
- Carolina Isakson Proctor, 81, Colombian First Lady (1986–1990).
- Moira Milton, 88, Scottish amateur golfer.
- Patricia Neway, 92, American operatic soprano and musical theatre actress (The Sound of Music), Tony Award-winner.
- W. Allen Pepper Jr., 70, American jurist, federal judge for the Northern District of Mississippi (since 1999), heart attack.
- Bruce Riutta, 67, American Olympic ice hockey player, complications from heart surgery.
- Stig Sæterbakken, 46, Norwegian writer.
- Pierre Sinibaldi, 87, French footballer and manager.
- William Crossley, 3rd Baron Somerleyton, 83, British aristocrat and courtier, Master of the Horse (1991– 1999).
- Carleton B. Swift Jr., 92, American intelligence officer.
- Gyula Tarr, 80, Hungarian Olympic wrestler.
- Althea Wynne, 75, British sculptor.

=== 25 ===
- Sir Alfred Ball, 91, British air marshal.
- Paavo Berglund, 82, Finnish conductor.
- Josef Brunner, 83, German politician.
- Veronica Carstens, 88, German First Lady (1979–1984).
- Carlos Escarrá, 57, Venezuelan politician, Attorney General (since 2011), heart attack.
- Emil Hossu, 70, Romanian actor, cardiac arrest.
- Kazimierz Jasiński, 65, Polish Olympic cyclist, cancer.
- Jacques Maisonrouge, 87, French businessman, chairman of IBM World Trade Corporation.
- Mabel Manzotti, 73, Argentine actress (Besos en la Frente, Vidas robadas), complications from a stroke.
- Len McIntyre, 78, British rugby league player.
- Andrew MacNaughtan, 47, Canadian photographer.
- Merab Megreladze, 55, Georgian football player.
- Abid Ali Nazish, 40, Afghan actor, shot.
- Franco Pacini, 72, Italian astronomer.
- Émile Paganon, 95, French skier.
- Mark Reale, 56, American heavy metal guitarist (Riot), Crohn's disease.
- Nick Santino, 47, American actor, suicide by drug overdose.
- Mary Semans, 91, American heiress and philanthropist.
- Robert Sheran, 96, American politician and judge.
- Charles Stanmore, 87, Australian Olympic fencer.
- Kosta Tsonev, 82, Bulgarian actor.
- Jean Wells, 56, American game designer.
- Alexander Zhitinsky, 71, Russian writer.

=== 26 ===
- Ian Abercrombie, 77, British actor (Seinfeld, Army of Darkness, Star Wars: The Clone Wars), kidney failure.
- Bahjat Abu Gharbieh, 95–96, Palestinian politician.
- Dimitra Arliss, 79, American actress (The Sting, General Hospital, Xanadu), complications from a stroke.
- Iggy Arroyo, 60, Filipino politician, Representative from the 5th District of Negros Occidental (since 2004), cardiac arrest.
- Alfredo Avelín, 84, Argentine politician, Governor of San Juan (1999–2002), multiple organ failure.
- Valentin Blazhes, 75, Soviet and Russian folklorist and literary scholar.
- Bud Byerly, 92, American baseball player (St. Louis Cardinals, Cincinnati Reds).
- Kartar Singh Duggal, 94, Indian writer.
- Alex Eadie, 91, British politician, MP for Midlothian (1966–1992).
- M. O. H. Farook, 74, Indian politician and diplomat, Governor of Kerala (since 2011).
- Clare Fischer, 83, American composer.
- Robert Hegyes, 60, American actor (Welcome Back, Kotter; Cagney & Lacey), heart attack.
- Seui Laau, 69, American Samoan politician.
- Roberto Mieres, 87, Argentine racing driver.
- Miguel Nazar Haro, 87, Mexican intelligence chief, head of the Dirección Federal de Seguridad (1978–1982).
- Stan Smith, 79, Australian VFL football player.
- Colin Tarrant, 59, British actor (The Bill), suicide by exsanguination.
- Juan Fremiot Torres Oliver, 86, Puerto Rican Roman Catholic prelate, Bishop of Ponce (1964–2000).
- Robert Turner, 91, Canadian composer.

=== 27 ===
- Hikmat Mizban Ibrahim, 80, Iraqi politician, Minister of Finance (1995–2003).
- Russ Arnold, 90, American bridge player.
- Fernanza Burgess, 51, American football player.
- Tom Campbell, 84, Canadian politician, Mayor of Vancouver (1967–1972).
- Chen Chuanxi, 95, Chinese conductor.
- Robert Collins, 87, British rower.
- Greg Cook, 65, American football player (Cincinnati Bengals), complications from pneumonia.
- Kay Davis, 91, American jazz singer.
- Reza de Wet, 59, South African playwright, leukaemia.
- Ted Dicks, 83, English composer.
- Thomas Fennell, 84, Canadian politician.
- Jeannette Hamby, 78, American politician, Oregon State Senator (1983–1999), stroke complications and cancer.
- Deepika Joshi-Shah, 36, Indian singer and voice actress.
- Todd Lynn, 47, American stand-up comedian and actor (My Wife and Kids).
- James Metcalf, 86, American sculptor.
- Richard K. Olney, 64, American physician, pioneer in clinical research on amyotrophic lateral sclerosis.
- Hermano Pablo, 90, American evangelist and broadcaster.
- Bogusława Pietkiewicz, 67, Polish Olympic diver.
- István Rózsavölgyi, 82, Hungarian runner, Olympic bronze medalist (1960), heart problems.
- Juan Sarrachini, 65, Argentine footballer.
- Kazimierz Smoleń, 91, Polish museum director and Holocaust survivor.
- Kevin White, 82, American politician, Mayor of Boston (1968–1984).

=== 28 ===
- Bob Armstrong, 50, American ice hockey player.
- Diana Bliss, 57, Australian public relations consultant and theatre producer, wife of Alan Bond.
- Richard C. Butler, 83, British farmer and merchant banker.
- Joseph Curran, 89, American college basketball coach (Canisius).
- Don Fullmer, 72, American boxer, lymphoid leukemia.
- Keriman Halis Ece, 98, Turkish beauty pageant queen, pianist and fashion model, Miss Turkey 1932.
- Roman Juszkiewicz, 59, Polish astrophysicist.
- Chand Mal Lodha, 93, Indian judge.
- Andrew McMillan, 54, Australian writer and music journalist.
- Paul F. O'Rourke, 87, American politician.
- Don Starkell, 79, Canadian adventurist and author.

=== 29 ===
- Karin Aasma, 85, Estonian-Swedish art historian.
- Lee Adler, 88, American historic preservationist.
- Yomi Bankole, 52, Nigerian table tennis player.
- L. Basavaraju, 92, Indian scholar.
- Damien Bona, 56, American journalist, writer and film historian, heart attack.
- Henrique da Silva Horta, 91, Portuguese vice admiral and colonial administrator.
- John H. Davis, 82, American author, Alzheimer's disease.
- Tatiana Dorofeeva, 64, Russian linguist, orientalist and translator.
- Predrag Dragić, 66, Serbian writer.
- Nijaz Duraković, 63, Bosnian author and politician.
- Ranjit Singh Dyal, 83, Indian Army general.
- Borys Fedorenko, 65, Ukrainian painter.
- Hellen Huisman, 74, Dutch voice actress.
- François Migault, 67, French racing driver.
- Syed Abu Nasar, 79, Indian professor of electrical engineering.
- Kell Osborne, 72, American singer.
- Goody Petronelli, 88, American boxing trainer and manager (Marvin Hagler).
- John Rich, 86, American television director (All in the Family, Benson, The Dick Van Dyke Show), heart failure.
- Oscar Luigi Scalfaro, 93, Italian politician, Minister of the Interior (1983–1987); President (1992–1999) and Lifetime Senator (since 1999).
- Gabriel Lawrence Sengol, 83, Indian Roman Catholic prelate, Bishop of Tiruchirapalli (1990–1997).
- J. O. Urmson, 96, British philosopher.
- Camilla Williams, 92, American opera singer, complications from cancer.

=== 30 ===
- Eladio Acosta Arteaga, 95, Colombian Roman Catholic prelate, Archbishop of Santa Fe de Antioquia (1988–1992).
- Rolf Appel, 90, German chemist.
- Frank Aschenbrenner, 86, German-born American football player (Chicago Hornets, Montreal Alouettes).
- Don Blenkarn, 81, Canadian politician, MP for Mississauga (1972–1974) and Mississauga South (1979–1993).
- Terence Cowley, 83, Australian cricketer.
- Klaus Goldschlag, 89, Canadian ambassador.
- Helmi Höhle, 87, German Olympic fencer.
- George Lambert, 83, American Olympic silver (1956) and bronze (1960) medal-winning modern pentathlete.
- Abdelhamid Mehri, 85, Algerian resistance fighter and politician.
- Doeschka Meijsing, 64, Dutch novelist.
- Michael D. Ryan, 66, American jurist, Justice of the Arizona Supreme Court (2002–2010), apparent heart attack.
- Idichapuli Selvaraj, 73, Indian actor.
- Frederick Treves, 86, British actor (The Elephant Man).
- Johann Carl Vogel, 79, South African physicist.
- Bill Wallace, 64, American author.

=== 31 ===
- Stefano Angeleri, 85, Italian footballer and coach.
- Everardus Antonius M. Baaij, 90, Dutch-born South African Roman Catholic prelate, Bishop of Aliwal (1973–1981).
- Mani Ram Bagri, 91, Indian politician.
- Rick Behenna, 51, American baseball player (Atlanta Braves, Cleveland Indians), cancer.
- Anthony Bevilacqua, 88, American Roman Catholic prelate, Archbishop of Philadelphia (1988–2003).
- Leslie Carter, 25, American singer and reality star (House of Carters), drug overdose.
- H. John Caulfield, 75, American optical physicist.
- Bob Citron, 79, American entrepreneur and aerospace engineer, prostate cancer.
- Tristram P. Coffin, 89, American folklorist.
- Zelda Curtis, 88, British journalist and feminist.
- Stacy Doris, 49, American poet, cancer.
- Felicia Eze, 37, Nigerian Olympic footballer.
- Ayelet Galena, 2, American child, born with dyskeratosis congenita, lung complications.
- Juan Carlos Gené, 82, Argentine actor and playwright.
- John Hughes, 66, American drug counselor.
- Mikel Japp, 59, Welsh musician and songwriter.
- Siddika Kabir, 80, Bangladeshi teacher, television show host and cookbook author.
- Petros Karatroupkos, 82, Greek-born Zambian Orthodox hierarch, Bishop of Zambia (2001–2003).
- Mike Kelley, 57, American artist and musician (Destroy All Monsters), suicide. (body found on this date)
- Bob LaPointe, 66, American high school and college football coach.
- Peadar Maher, 87, Irish politician, TD for Laois–Offaly (1951–1961).
- Clara Nomee, 73, American politician, first female Chairperson of the Crow Nation (1990–2000).
- Sid Ottewell, 92, English footballer (Nottingham Forest F.C.).
- Al Rio, 49, Brazilian comic book artist, suicide by hanging.
- Antonio Segura, 64, Spanish comics writer.
- King Stitt, 71, Jamaican singer, complications from prostate cancer and diabetes.
- Dorothea Tanning, 101, American surrealist painter, printmaker and sculptor.
- Bob Thalman, 89, American football player and coach.
