= List of radio evangelists =

This is a list of preachers who reached their parishioners through the medium of radio.

Radio evangelists
| Name | Lifespan | Branch | Organization or church |
|---|---|---|---|
| A. A. Allen | 1911–1970 | Pentecostal | |
| Garner Ted Armstrong | 1930–2003 | Evangelical | Worldwide Church of God |
| Herbert W. Armstrong | 1892–1986 | Evangelical | Worldwide Church of God |
| Batsell Barrett Baxter | 1916–1983 | Nondenominational Christianity | Churches of Christ |
| Dave Breese | 1926–2002 | Evangelical | |
| C. W. Burpo | 1904–1982 | Fundamentalist | Bible Institute of the Air |
| E. Howard Cadle | 1884–1942 | Independent | |
| S. Parkes Cadman | 1864–1936 | Liberal Protestant | |
| Charles Coughlin | 1891–1979 | Roman Catholic | |
| Percy Crawford | 1902–1960 | Fundamentalist | |
| W. A. Criswell | 1909–2002 | Baptist | Southern Baptist Convention |
| M. R. DeHaan | 1891–1965 | Independent | |
| Sheldon Emry | 1926–1985 | Christian Identity | America's Promise Ministries |
| Theodore Epp | 1907–1985 | Mennonite | |
| Tony Evans | born 1949 | Evangelical | |
| Paul Edwin Finkenbinder, known as Hermano Pablo | 1921–2012 | Evangelical | |
| Charles E. Fuller | 1887–1968 | Baptist | |
| Oliver B. Greene | 1915–1976 | Fundamental Independent Baptist | |
| Mordecai Ham | 1877–1961 | Independent Baptist | |
| Billy James Hargis | 1925–2004 | Fundamentalist | Church of the Christian Crusade |
| Noah Hutchings | 1922–2015 | Fundamentalist | Southwest Radio Church |
| Sergei Kourdakov | 1951–1973 | Evangelical | |
| Carl McIntire | 1908–2002 | Presbyterian | Bible Presbyterian Church |
| John W. Murray | 1913–1996 | | |
| Walter A. Maier | 1893–1950 | Lutheran | |
| John MacArthur | born 1939 | Fundamentalist | Grace Community Church |
| Aimee Semple McPherson | 1890–1944 | Pentecostal | Foursquare Church |
| J. Frank Norris | 1877–1952 | Independent Baptist | |
| Lester Roloff | 1914–1982 | Fundamental Independent Baptist | |
| Robert P. Shuler | 1880–1965 | Southern Methodist | |
| Chuck Swindoll | born 1934 | | Stonebriar Community Church |
| Omega Townsend, known as Prophet Omega | 1927–1992 | | |
| Alma Bridwell White | 1862–1946 | | Pillar of Fire International |
| Jack Wyrtzen | 1913–1996 | Evangelical | Word of Life Fellowship |

== See also ==
- List of television evangelists
