= Nishimoto =

Nishimoto (written: 西本) is a Japanese surname. Notable people with the surname include:

- Hiroyuki Nishimoto (西本 裕行, 1927–2015), Japanese actor
- Joe M. Nishimoto (1919–1944), United States Army soldier and Medal of Honor recipient
- Kaoru Nishimoto (西本 馨, 1923–2012), Japanese shogi player
- Katsuko Nishimoto (西本 勝子, 1950–2025), Japanese politician
- Kenta Nishimoto (西本 拳太, born 1994), Japanese badminton player
- Kimiko Nishimoto (西本喜美子, 1928–2025), Brazilian-born Japanese photographer and internet celebrity
- Makoto Nishimoto (西本 誠, born 1986), Japanese politician
- Masataka Nishimoto (西本 雅崇, born 1996), Japanese footballer
- Noriko Nishimoto (西本 則子, 1940–2016), Japanese-Australian puppeteer
- Rimi Nishimoto (西本りみ, born 1994), Japanese voice actress
- Scott Nishimoto, American politician
- Takashi Nishimoto (西本 聖, born 1956), Japanese baseball player and coach
- Takeshi Nishimoto (born 1974), Japanese guitarist and composer
- Tatsuhiro Nishimoto (西本 竜洋, born 1980), Japanese footballer
- Tetsuo Nishimoto (西本 哲雄, born 1950), Japanese volleyball player
- Tomomi Nishimoto (西本 智実, born 1970), Japanese conductor
- Yoshimitsu Nishimoto (西本 宣充, born 1968), Japanese weightlifter
- Yukio Nishimoto (西本 幸雄, 1920–2011), Japanese baseball player and manager

== See also ==
- Miku Nishimoto-Neubert, Japanese classical pianist
- 10193 Nishimoto, a main-belt asteroid
- Nishimoto Trading Co., Ltd., a Japanese import/export company
