= Richard Olney (disambiguation) =

Richard Olney (1835–1917) was United States Attorney General and Secretary of State .

Richard Olney may also refer to:

- Richard Olney II (1871–1939), member of the United States House of Representatives from Massachusetts
- Richard K. Olney (1947–2012), American physician and pioneer in clinical research on amyotrophic lateral sclerosis
- Richard Olney (food writer) (1927–1999), American painter, cook, food writer, editor and memoirist
