= Fujinuma =

Fujinuma (written: 藤沼) is a Japanese surname. Notable people with the surname include:

- Ai Fujinuma (藤沼 亜衣, born 1982), Japanese table tennis player
- Takashi Fujinama (藤沼 貴, 1931–2012), Japanese translator and philologist
- Takumu Fujinuma (藤沼 拓夢, born 1997), Japanese footballer

== See also ==
- Fujinuma Dam, a dam in Sukagawa, Fukushima Prefecture, Japan
