= Feigin =

Feigin (Feygin, Fejgin, Faygin) is a Jewish surname. It is a matronymic surname derived from the Yiddish female name Feig, Feige, Feiga. "Feigins" is the legal Latvian spelling of the surname according to the law on Latvian names.

Notable people with the surname include:

- Alexandra Feigin (born 2002), Bulgarian figure skater
- Anatol Fejgin (1909–2002), Polish communist
- Andrzej Krzysztof Wróblewski (born Fejgin; 1935–2012), Polish journalist
- Dov Feigin, (1907–2000), Israeli sculptor
- Leo Feigin, also known as Aleksei Leonidov, disk jockey and musical producer, founder of Leo Records
- Mark Feygin, (born 1971), Russian lawyer and human rights activist
- Moisey Feigin, (1904–2008), Russian artist
- Movsas Feigins, (1908–1950), Latvian chess master
- Ralph Feigin, (1938–2008), American pediatrician
- Sarah Feigin (1928–2011), Latvian-born Israeli composer

== See also ==
- Fagin, fictional character in the Charles Dickens novel Oliver Twist
