= Elwood Davis =

Elwood Davis can refer to:

- F. Elwood Davis (1915–2012), American lawyer, civic leader and philanthropist
- J. Elwood Davis (active 1915–1920), American football player and coach
