= Burpo =

Burpo is a surname. Notable people with the surname include:

- C. W. Burpo (1904–1982), American radio evangelist
- George Burpo (1922–2015), American baseball player
- Preston Burpo (born 1972), American soccer player and coach
- Todd Burpo (born 1968), American author and pastor, wrote Heaven Is For Real
