= Feste (surname) =

Feste is a surname. Notable people with the surname include:

- Hilda Feste (1913–2012), Norwegian murder victim
- Shana Feste (born 1975), American film director and screenwriter

== See also ==
- Feste, character in William Shakespeare's Twelfth Night.
- Alte Feste, historic building in Windhoek, Namibia.
