= Grua (surname) =

Grua or La Grua, used as a surname, may refer to:

- Carlo Grua (1700–1773), Italian composer
- Emmy La Grua (1831–1869), Italian opera singer
- Kenton Grua (1950–2002), American explorer
- Matteo La Grua (1914–2012), Italian Roman Catholic priest and exorcist of the Franciscan Order
- Shawn Ellen LaGrua (1962), American judge
