= List of mayors of Dudelange =

This is a list of mayors of the Luxembourgish commune with town status of Dudelange.

== List of Mayors ==
| Name | Start | End |
|---|---|---|
| Jean Magnette | 1797 | 1798 |
| Michel Krips | 1798 | 1799 |
| Jean Michel Philippart | 1799 | 1801 |
| Michel Weber | 1801 | 1804 |
| Max Boland | 1804 | 1805 |
| Orphée Bernard | 1805 | 1807 |
| Frantz Plutot | 1807 | 1814 |
| Jean Baptiste Schmitt | 1815 | 1821 |
| Jean Pierre Gérard | 1822 | 1836 |
| Pierre Theis | 1836 | 1844 |
| Michel Berwick | 1844 | 1849 |
| Jean Antoine Philippart | 1849 | 1854 |
| Michel Landtgen | 1854 | 1861 |
| Henri Steichen | 1861 | 1863 |
| Franz Theis | 1864 | 1882 |
| Michel Adolphe Sinner | 1882 | 1893 |
| Pierre Theis (first time) | 1894 | 1896 |
| Jean Nieles | 1897 | 1902 |
| Pierre Theis (second time) | 1903 | 1914 |
| Jean Berchem | 1914 | 1920 |
| Michel Gindt | 1920 | 1925 |
| François Scholer | 1925 | 1928 |
| Emile Ludwig | 1929 | 1935 |
| Théodore Thiel | 1935 | 1946 |
| Jean Fohrmann | 1946 | 1965 |
| René Hartmann | 1965 | 1973 |
| Nicolas Birtz | 1973 | 1984 |
| Louis Rech | 1985 | 1993 |
| Mars Di Bartolomeo | 1994 | 2004 |
| Alex Bodry | 2004 | 2014 |
| Dan Biancalana | 2014 | present |
