= Louis Rech =

Louis Rech; born Luigi Rech; (7 December 1926 – 6 January 2012) was a Luxembourgish politician and trade unionist. A member of the Luxembourg Socialist Workers' Party, Rech served as Mayor of Dudelange between 1985 and 1993.

Born as one of six children in Faller, Sovramonte, Province of Belluno, Italy, Rech's parents emigrated to Dudelange, in southern Luxembourg, when he was one year old, in order for Rech's father to work in the Arbed steel mill. They lived in Dudelange's Italian Quarter, speaking Italian in everyday life and retaining Italian traditions. Despite this, Rech didn't return to Italy until the age of 35, having naturalised as a Luxembourgish citizen in 1956.

Rech progressed from the trade union movement to involvement in the Luxembourg Socialist Workers' Party (LSAP). In 1985, he became Mayor of Dudelange, becoming the first Italian Luxembourger to hold the position of mayor in any commune.

== Footnotes ==
Political offices
Preceded by Nicolas Birtz	Mayor of Dudelange; 1985–1993	Succeeded by Mars Di Bartolomeo
