= Tubby Bacon =

American baseball owner, oenophile, and underwriter

Robert H. Bacon Jr. (1930 – January 9, 2012), nicknamed "Tubby," was an American businessman. He served as part owner of the Milwaukee Braves of Major League Baseball. Bacon also sat on the board of the Independence Bank of Chicago and was a known underwriter of Lloyd's of London.

Bacon was raised on the North Shore of Chicago. He graduated from New Trier High School in Winnetka, Illinois, and the University of Illinois at Urbana–Champaign, with a degree in marketing, in 1952. Bacon served in the United States Army for two years, and then worked for his father's press clipping agency, Bacon's Clipping Bureau. He later became president of the company.

Bacon was a noted oenophile and was one of "Chicago's leading gastronomes." He was honored by the government of France for his knowledge of French wine in 1990.

Bacon and his wife, Juliet, had four children. He died on January 9, 2012, in Northwestern Memorial Hospital after a long illness.
