= Fatima al-Aqel =

Yemeni activist for people with disabilities

- Born: 1957; Yemen
- Died: January 11, 2012 (aged 54–55); Yemen
- Occupation: Activist
- Known for: Activism for individuals with disabilities

Fatima al-Aqel (Arabic: فاطمة العاقل; died January 11, 2012) was an activist for individuals with disabilities. She directed most of her efforts advocating for women with blindness in Yemen. The president of the Arab Association for Human Rights, Raja Al-Masabi, said her work had been key to educating women with visual impairment in Yemen.

== Biography ==
While studying at Cairo University, Al-Aqel lost her sight. She finished her degree, despite her new disability, getting a bachelor of arts and receiving a diploma in Islamic studies.

Al-Aqel opened the first school for blind women in Yemen in 1995. Later, she founded an organization, the Al-Aman Organization Blind Women Care (AOBWC, جمعية الأمان لرعاية الكفيفات) in 1997 in order to further the opportunities for blind women in education and the workforce. The country of Yemen has a high rate of blindness and eye diseases, many of which are treatable. However many Yemenis can't afford treatment, or in some cases, receive poor medical advice, and go blind as a result. In 2012, it was estimated that there were around 76,000 blind Yemenis, most of them living in rural areas. In Yemen, people with disabilities face difficult challenges receiving education and access to social and public services.

Al-Aqel wanted women in Yemen to be able to be an active part of society and able to continue their education and be able to obtain employment. AOBWC as a group supports the education of women with blindness in order to help them take part in social and political spheres. Her group also helps adapt literature to Braille. The group also works closely with the Education Ministry and other similar foundations. In 2001, Al-Aqel entered into a mutual cooperation agreement between AOBWC and the British Cultural Council began.

In 2012, Al-Aqel was honored by the Balqis Award, an annual $20,000 prize which is given to recognize the contributions of women's groups in Yemen. Al-Aqel was also honored at the third annual "Festival of the Blind" in Sana'a in 2013 for her work in AOBWC as she strove to create a "more compassionate and considerate world for the blind."
