= Felipe Fernández =

Argentine basketball player

Personal information
- Born: 9 July 1933
- Died: 13 January 2012 (aged 78)
Medals
Men's basketball
Representing Argentina
Pan American Games
Silver medal – second place	1955 Mexico City	Team

Felipe Fernández (9 July 1933 – 13 January 2012) was an Argentine basketball player.
