= Borys Fedorenko =

Ukrainian painter (1946–2012)

- Born: February 23, 1946; Sydorivka, Cherkasy Oblast, Ukrainian Soviet Socialist Republic, Soviet Union
- Died: January 29, 2012 (aged 65)
- Known for: Painting

Borys Fedorenko (Ukrainian: Федоренко Борис Михайлович; February 23, 1946 — January 29, 2012) was a Ukrainian painter. Member of National Union of Artists of Ukraine since 1985.

== Works ==
=== Selected works ===
- The Wheelright, 1969
- New Darnytsia, 1988
- On the border, 1989
- The Breath of Autumn, 1989
- The Lake, 1989
- Autumn evening, 1989
- Angels in Paradise, 1995
- On Pasture, 1996
- On the field, 1997
- Snow in the mountains, 1997
- Outside the village, 1998
- May, 1998
- Dubovica. Sunny day, 1998
- Numana. Italy, 1999
- Homeland, 1999
- Cool morning, 1999
- The Street. Korsun-Shevchenkivskyi, 2000
- Castle on the River Ros, 2001
- On the outskirts of the village. Evening, 2002

== Museums ==
- uk:Кременчуцький краєзнавчий музей
- uk:Корсунь-Шевченківська художня галерея
- Memorial museum of Ivan Piddubny, Bohoduhivka, Cherkasy Oblast
- it:Pinacoteca civica Francesco Podesti
- it:Pinacoteca comunale Donatello Stefanucci
- Palazzo Buonaccorsi
- East Slovak Gallery
- de:Mußbach (Neustadt) museum
- Gemäldegalerie, Berlin
- Musée des beaux-arts de Bordeaux
- Private collections in Italy, Ukraine, Germany, Slovakia, Japan

== Exhibitions ==
=== Solo ===
Year	Venue	City	Country
1989	Luhansk Regional Art Museum	Luhansk	Soviet Union
1993	Ukrainian Society for the Protection of Monuments of History and Culture	Kyiv	Ukraine
1993	Pinacoteca Comunale "Donatello Stefanucci"	Cingoli	Italy
1993	Macerata Provincial Museum	Macerata	Italy
1994	Neustadt Municipal Museum	Neustadt	Germany
1995	Neustadt Municipal Museum	Neustadt	Germany
1995	Macerata Provincial Museum	Macerata	Italy
1996	The International Convention Center "Ukrainian House"	Kyiv	Ukraine
1997	Hegenberg Municipal Museum	Hegenberg	Germany
1998	Gemäldegalerie	Berlin	Germany
1999	Gemäldegalerie	Berlin	Germany
1998	Taras Shevchenko National Museum	Kyiv	Ukraine
1998	East Slovak Gallery	Košice	Slovakia
1999	Ukrainian Cultural Foundation	Kyiv	Ukraine
2001	Taras Shevchenko National Museum	Kyiv	Ukraine
2001	Ukrainian Cultural Foundation	Kyiv	Ukraine

=== Republican ===
Year	Subject	City	Country
1987	Republican art exhibition dedicated to the 70th anniversary of the Great October Revolution	Kyiv	Soviet Union

=== Collective ===
Year	Subject	City	Country
1992—1997	Medzinarodna Skupina Vytvarnikov na Slovensku	Dubovica	Slovakia
1993	Le Groupe Ukrain'Art	Bordeaux	France
1994	Soviet Realist and Impressionist Painting	London	United Kingdom
1995	XLV Rassegna d'Arte G.B. Salvi e Piccola Europa	Sassoferrato	Italy
1998—2000	Medzinarodny Plener Vytvarnikov na Slovensku	Dubovica	Slovakia
2002	Art exhibition of paintings of Ros' art group	Korsun-Shevchenkivskyi	Ukraine

== Awards ==
- The First prize and Gold medal laureate in pan-European painting competition "Cingoli il lago e il cane" in Cingoli, Italy
- Awarded the badge uk:Знак пошани
