= Yoshimitsu Nishimoto =

Japanese weightlifter

Personal information
- Nationality: Japanese
- Born: 16 March 1968 (age 57)

Sport
- Sport: Weightlifting

Yoshimitsu Nishimoto (西本 宣充, Nishimoto Yoshimitsu, born 16 March 1968) is a Japanese weightlifter. He competed at the 1992 Summer Olympics and the 1996 Summer Olympics. In the 1992 Summer Olympics in Barcelona, he finished 8th in the Heavyweight I category (≤100 kg), his best Olympic performance.
