= Daniel Alba =

Mexican wrestler

Personal information
- Born: 8 November 1940 Chihuahua, Mexico
- Died: 21 January 2012 (aged 71)

Professional wrestling career

Daniel Alba (8 November 1940 – 21 January 2012) was a Mexican wrestler. He competed at the 1968 Summer Olympics.
