= Jack R. Carl =

American football and basketball player and coach

Biographical details
- Born: October 18, 1919; Kittanning, Pennsylvania, U.S.
- Died: January 3, 2012 (aged 92)

Playing career

Football
- 1938–1940: Denison

Baseball
- c. 1940: Denison

Track
- c. 1940: Denison

Coaching career (HC unless noted)

Football
- 1941: East Palestine HS (OH) (assistant)
- 1946: Indiana (B team)
- 1947–1948: Hanover
- 1949–1953: Denison

Basketball
- 1941–1942: East Palestine JHS (OH)
- 1946–1947: Indiana (B team)
- 1947–1949: Hanover

Track
- 1947–1949: Hanover
- 1949–1954: Denison

Head coaching record
- Overall: 37–19–1 (college football); 23–21 (college basketball)

Accomplishments and honors

Championships
- Football; 1 Hoosier (1948)

Jack Reese Carl (October 18, 1919 – January 3, 2012) was an American football, basketball, and track coach. He served as the head football coach at Hanover College in Hanover, Indiana from 1947 to 1948 and at his alma mater, Denison University in Granville, Ohio, from 1949 to 1953, compiling a career college football record of 37–19–1. Carl was also the head basketball coach at Hanover from 1947 to 1949, tallying a mark of 23–21.

Carl lettered in football, baseball, and track at Denison before graduating in 1941. He began that fall in East Palestine, Ohio, where he was and assistant football coach at East Palestine High School and taught physical education and coached basketball at the East Palestine's junior high school. He entered the United States Navy and spent 32 months overseas during World War II as a lieutenant. He was with the first wave of amphibious assaults and invasion of the following islands: Tarawa in the Gilbert Islands on 20 Nov 1943; Kwajalein invasion on 31 Jan 1944; Guam invasion on 21 Jul 1944; and Leyte Gulf in the Philippines on 20 Oct 1944. While at Leyte, Carl was the Beachmaster in charge of all traffic coming in and out of the landing zone. General MacArthur and his staff upon arrival requested a dry landing but the docks were too badly damaged during the battle. Sporting a freshly pressed khaki uniform, MacArthur hoped to tie onto a pier and majestically strut ashore dry and immaculate as befit the American Caesar come to take back his beloved islands where both he and his Medal of Honor winner father had served and had deep roots. The beachmaster, however, had other ideas. When the Higgins boat filled with top brass got bogged down fifty yards out, he didn’t have time to devote to finding them one of the few intact piers. As the absolute authority, the beachmaster barked “Let ‘em walk!” And thus was the famous image of MacArthur wading ashore in knee-deep water, ruining the perfect creases on his trousers. What photographers took to be MacArthur’s steely look of determination as he strode ashore was actually him glaring at the impertinent beachmaster. (When he saw the photo later, however, the general immediately realized its dramatic imagery and opted to purposefully wade in on subsequent landings. Those who saw his later landings proffered the myth that the original was staged. It was not.)

After the war, Carl coached the varsity "B" squad in football at basketball at Indiana University Bloomington, where he worked for a Master of Science degree in physical education. In April 1947, he was appoint head coach in football, basketball, and track at Hanover.

Carl resign from his post at Denison in March 1954 to enter private business in Norwalk, Ohio. He was replaced as head football coach by Keith W. Piper, who was worked as Carl's line coach for three seasons. Carl was elected to the Denison Hall of Fame in 1997 for Football, Track & Field, and Baseball.

== Head coaching record ==
=== College football ===
Year	Team	Overall	Conference	Standing	Bowl/playoffs
Hanover Panthers (Hoosier Conference) (1947–1948)
1947	Hanover	7–1	5–1	T–2nd	
1948	Hanover	6–2	6–0	T–1st	
Hanover:		13–3	11–1		
Denison Big Red (Ohio Athletic Conference) (1949–1953)
1949	Denison	5–3	4–2	5th	
1950	Denison	4–4	3–3	8th	
1951	Denison	4–3–1	3–2–1	T–4th	
1952	Denison	4–4	4–2	5th	
1953	Denison	7–2	4–2	T–4th	
Denison:		24–16–1	18–11–1		
Total:		37–19–1			
National championship Conference title Conference division title or championship game berth
