= Slavko Ziherl =

Slovenian psychiatrist

Slavko Ziherl (September 23, 1945 – January 21, 2012) was a Slovenian specialist in psychiatry.

== Early life and education ==
Ziherl was born in Ljubljana in 1945. He graduated from the University of Ljubljana Faculty of Medicine in 1970, and specialised in neuropsychiatry at the University Psychiatric Clinic Ljubljana in 1976 and in psychiatry in the Netherlands in 1993. He held a Ph.D. in the field of psychiatry. He specialised in psychiatry in Great Britain for one year, and attended advanced studies in the US, Great Britain and Canada. Ziherl resided in Ljubljana. He was married with two children.

== Career ==
From 1978 to 1990 Ziherl was the head of the Centre for Treatment of Alcohol Addiction of the University Psychiatric Hospital in Ljubljana, and from 1994 to 1996 he was the head of the Centre for Clinical Psychiatry of the University Psychiatric Hospital, and until 1998 he was the medical director of the Psychiatric Hospital of the University Medical Centre. After the independence of the Ljubljana Psychiatric Hospital, he was the general director until 2000, and since 2004, he was the medical director of this hospital. Since 1976, he was working in the outpatient clinic for treating sexual disorders, and since 1996, he was the head of the clinic.

Ziherl had been a university teacher of psychiatry at the Ljubljana Faculty of Medicine since 1997, and since 1996 he was the holder of the subject Forensic Psychopathology at the Ljubljana Faculty of Law. He was heading postgraduate studies for psychotherapy at the Ljubljana Faculty of Medicine since 1994. He was the holder of the subject Forensic Psychiatry for the master's degree in criminal law at the Faculty of Law. He also held lectures in psychopathology at the postgraduate level at the Ljubljana Faculty of Medicine. He was the national coordinator for specialisation in psychiatry and the chief mentor to specialists of psychiatry.

Ziherl was a member of the Health Council at the Ministry of Health (1997–2002). Since 1999, he was a member of the Committee for Expert Medical Issues at the Medical Chamber of Slovenia. From 1996 to 2000 he was the president of the Association of Psychiatrists, and in 2004 he was re-elected for the president of the Association of Psychiatrists. He was the president of the Extended Expert Council for Psychiatry. In 1995, he was the representative of the Association of Psychiatrists and Slovenian health care centres in the European Union of Medical Specialists (UEMS), Section of Psychiatry and the European Board of Psychiatry (EBP). In 2001, he became vice-president of the EBP.

== Publications ==
Ziherl was the author of books on controlling alcohol, on autohypnosis, several articles and chapters in the professional literature, as well as the co-editor and author of several chapters in a textbook on psychiatry. He translated 10 psychological handbooks from English into Slovenian. He also wrote about Nazi treatment and extermination of the mentally ill. His bibliography amounts to more than 190 titles. He also published articles in newspapers and magazines and appeared on radio and television programs.

== Later life and death ==
In his last years, he was an active member of the Liberal Democracy of Slovenia party. He also was a Ljubljana City Councillor. He died in Ljubljana on 21 January 2012 due to heart disease.
