= Paul F. O'Rourke =

Paul F. O'Rourke (August 31, 1924 – January 28, 2012) was a founding member of Operation USA and its first board chair, the first Director of the California State Office of Economic Opportunity, a public health advisor to Senator Robert F. Kennedy and numerous state and federal agencies, and a Board Chairman of the San Francisco Trauma Foundation.

== Education and early career ==
Born August 31, 1924, in Cambridge, Massachusetts, O'Rourke was a 1948 graduate of Harvard University Medical School and an early proponent of equal access to health care for underprivileged and disenfranchised populations. In 1959, while in his early 30s, he left a private practice in Marin County, California, to serve the state's migrant laborers, minorities, and the poor.

O'Rourke earned a Master's of Public Health Degree in Epidemiology at UC Berkeley, and in 1960 took his first public sector job as Director of Public Health Services in Imperial County, an agricultural region with the state's highest rates of infant mortality and tuberculosis.

== Imperial County ==
The Imperial Valley was at the time the focus of AFL-CIO efforts to unionize farm laborers, whose wages averaged 90 cents an hour. Under pressure from local growers and out of concern for the agricultural economy, the county Board of Supervisors directed O'Rourke to withhold health services from strikers and union sympathizers among the farm worker ranks, but he did not comply.

When more than 40 strikers were arrested and incarcerated in the county's jail, O'Rourke was asked by the state to confirm that conditions at the jail were safe and sanitary. O'Rourke concluded that the jail was not adequate to house that many people. His report to that effect was considered by the Board of Supervisors to be insubordinate, and they discharged him from his post.

The California Department of Health Services then threatened to withhold state funding from Imperial County unless O'Rourke was reinstated, and although he did continue in his position for several more months, he ultimately resigned, stating that the political environment prevented him from carrying out the mission of the department. O'Rourke submitted his resignation one year from the date he accepted the position.

== Public service ==
Shortly thereafter in 1962, he was appointed as Chief of Farm Worker Health Services for the California State Department of Health. He was considered the California state specialist in poverty matters and in 1964 became Special Assistant for Anti-Poverty Programs to Governor Edmund G. "Pat" Brown, who appointed him the first Director of the State Office of Economic Opportunity, an outgrowth of President Lyndon B. Johnson's War on Poverty. In that role Dr. O'Rourke helped coordinate the efforts of state agencies to establish equal access to housing, employment, education, and health services.

He continued to advise federal agencies on matters of migrant health, public hospitals, and community clinics in rural settings and was an advisor to the U.S. Senate Health Committee during development of the Medicaid program. O'Rourke also served as a public health consultant to the NAACP and the Legal Defense Fund, and advised the U.S. Department of Health and Human Services on the enforcement of Title Vl, the Civil Rights Act of 1964.

In 1967, O'Rourke began work with Senator Robert F. Kennedy on community health programs in the Bedford-Stuyvesant neighborhoods in Brooklyn, N.Y. and was the founding Director of the East Palo Alto Neighborhood Health Center from 1967 to 1970.

He served as a health policy analyst and advisor to the California State Senate on issues and legislation including industrial relations, occupational disability, mental health, injury prevention, and Worker's Compensation reform. In 1990 O'Rourke became a consultant to California's Little Hoover Commission, providing oversight of Medi-Cal and other state health programs.

Throughout his career, O'Rourke served as a consultant to the National Association of County Governments, and continued to assist cities and municipalities in setting up public health programs. His areas of expertise included neighborhood health centers, HMO development and regulation and serving groups with special needs, including the homeless, the aged, and those disabled by mental illness, developmental disorders, substance abuse, and HIV infection.

== Later career ==
O'Rourke authored and co-authored several publications on public health and health care systems. He traveled and lectured on disease and injury prevention, emergency medical systems, and disaster preparedness in low-income communities here and abroad.

He remained professionally active into his 70s, securing funding to encourage minority students to pursue professions in healthcare as adjunct faculty at UC Davis in the Minority Health Recruitment program. He was involved in domestic and international relief efforts as medical advisor and board chairman of Operation USA, a Los Angeles-based nonprofit disaster relief and community development agency. He traveled extensively throughout his life and maintained an abiding interest in politics, public health, and world affairs.

== Death and legacy ==
O'Rourke died on January 28, 2012, at his home in Aptos, California, at 87 years old. He was described by author Wendy Brooks as "a fiery Irishman" and at his death, USA Today journalist Linda Bixby said: "Paul O'Rourke was eloquent, scrappy, witty, and courageous. He proudly swam against the tide of prevailing wisdom, political expediency, and the medical establishment in service to the underprivileged, long before there was the political will or funding to do so. He never walked away from a fight, never compromised his principles, and never gave up on a person or a cause he believed in. Paul exemplified in both his personal and professional lives his deeply held conviction that every person has the right to be treated with fairness, dignity, and respect, and that serving those less fortunate is both an obligation and a privilege".

O'Rourke was survived by his wife of 45 years, Marilyn Citron O'Rourke (former mayor of Benicia, California) and his eight children.
