= Ellen Currie =

America author

Rose Ellen Currie
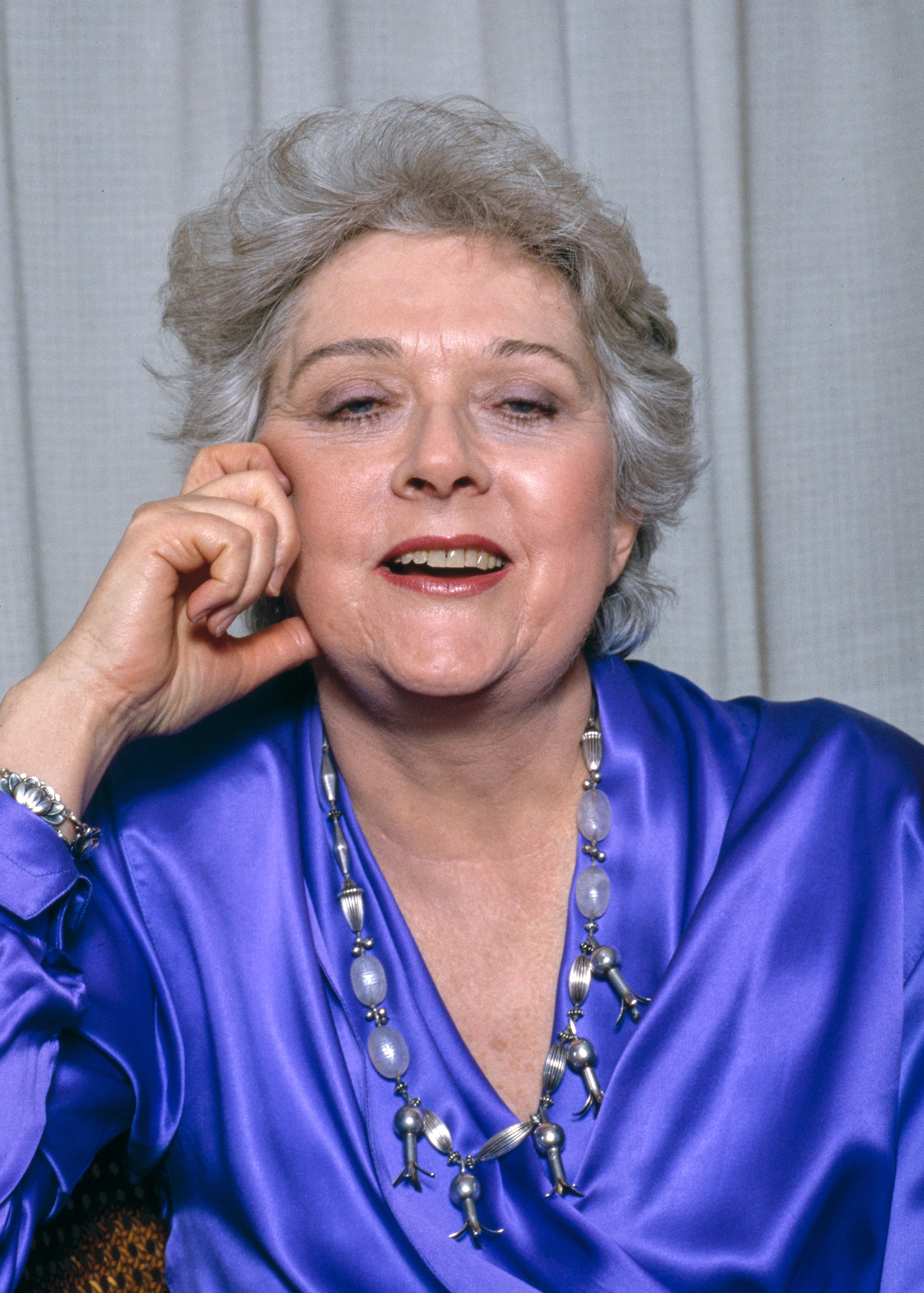
- Currie in 1987
- Died: January 3, 2012 (aged 81–82); Pennington, New Jersey
- Occupation: writer

Rose Ellen Currie (1930 – January 3, 2012) was a writer and advertising executive known for her first novel, Available Light.

Currie was born in Long Island, New York. Her father was an electrician and her mother was Scottish. As a young woman she corresponded with J. D. Salinger who told her that her stories "reek of talent."

Currie graduated from Adelphi University. She worked as a copywriter and later vice president for the J. Walter Thompson advertising agency. While doing graduate work at Columbia University, she wrote several short stories, primarily humorous, about Irish Americans, which were published in The New Yorker and selected for two O. Henry collections. The first novel she wrote was left in a taxicab and never recovered.

Her first published novel, Available Light, was a magical realist look at a romance gone bad in contemporary New York which came out in 1986. The New York Times said that it "takes risks and its sound is original," while the Chicago Tribune called it "wildly funny, weirdly accomplished and compulsively quotable." She received a Guggenheim Fellowship in 1987. Her second published work, a collection of "wonderful short stories" according to the New York Times, was Moses Supposes. It came out in 1994 and was a National Book Award finalist. Both books were republished by Mariner Books in 2006.
