= John Both Puok =

South Sudanese politician

John Both Puok (c. 1963 – January 9, 2012) was a South Sudanese politician. After the 2010 election, he served as Minister of Agriculture in the Unity state. Prior to being appointed minister, Puok had served as a member of the Unity state council of the Sudan People's Liberation Movement. He died on January 9, 2012, whilst undergoing treatment for lung cancer in India. He was 48.
