= Gene Methvin =

American pilot and journalist (1934–2012)

- Born: Eugene Hilburn Methvin; September 19, 1934; Vienna, Georgia
- Died: January 19, 2012 (aged 77); McLean, Virginia
- Occupations: Journalist, editor, commentator
- Notable credit: Reader's Digest
- Spouse: Barbara Lester Methvin
- Children: Helen Methvin Payne, Claudia Methvin
- Family: Claude M. Methvin, Jr., Madge Hilburn Methvin

Eugene Hilburn "Gene" Methvin (September 19, 1934 – January 19, 2012) was an American pilot, journalist, and senior editor for the Reader's Digest Washington, D.C., bureau. A self-described "shoe leather reporter," Methvin contributed more than 100 articles to Reader's Digest and its 48 editions, reaching more than 100 million readers worldwide. His articles covered topics ranging from the U.S. Supreme Court, civil liberties and constitutional law, to U.S. defense posture, Kremlin politics, U.S.-Soviet relations, organized crime and international terrorist groups. An article by Methvin in the January 1965 Reader's Digest, "How the Reds Make a Riot," won the magazine the award for public service in magazine journalism given annually by the Society for Professional Journalists.

Methvin's work on communism, crime and corruption earned him not only the respect of his peers, but influence in government. His articles in Reader's Digest helped rally necessary support for legislation that would go on to become law and, in 1983, he was appointed by President Ronald Reagan to the President's Commission on Organized Crime. Methvin supervised the commission's investigation and hearing on labor-management racketeering. Marvin Wolfgang, past president and fellow of the American Society of Criminology, wrote of Methvin, "No journalist or reporter knows more about criminology."

Along with his work with Reader's Digest, Methvin also authored two books: The Riot Makers: The Technology of Social Demolition, 1970, and The Rise of Radicalism: The Social Psychology of Messianic Extremism, 1973.

In 1995, the Washington, D.C. chapter of the Society of Professional Journalists named Methvin to its "Hall of Fame" for "exemplary professional achievements, outstanding service to other members of the profession and lifelong dedication to the highest standards of journalism."

== Early life ==
Methvin was born in Vienna, Georgia to Claude M. Methvin, Jr. and Madge Hilburn Methvin, editors and publishers of a local paper, The Vienna News.

Methvin began his journalism education by sleeping on a bale of newsprint every Thursday night while his parents met the weekly deadline. At the age of four, he got into a bucket of ink behind the family's flatbed cylinder press, and not even a gasoline bath could get all the printer's ink out of him. He started as a reporter (leg man only) before he could write, for at the age of five he would wander around the streets of his home town with pad and pencil asking residents to write down their news for him. Vienna, with a population of 2000, was a two-newspaper town in those days, chiefly as a result of his father's differences with a number of courthouse officials over a lynching, expressed in front-page editorials. Once while covering his beat, young Methvin encountered an assembly of grownups in one store gathered around the cracker barrel, and they offered a number of humorous quotes about the alleged superiorities of the opposition newspaper. Reporter Methvin promptly provided editorial comment: "Y'all are just a bunch of old damn fools," he declared. Whereupon he looked up and saw the town's Baptist preacher standing in the circle, so he quickly amended his copy: "All 'cep you, 'cause you work in the church-house," he said. Which, the preacher later declared from the pulpit, proved the youngster would make a good editor "because he knows who to call a damn fool and who to let alone."

Growing up in Vienna in the 1930s and 1940s had a major impact on Methvin’s work throughout his life. Methvin’s parents published The Vienna News, known for its opposition to Jim Crow laws. Methvin’s parents received death threats from Ku Klux Klan members for their views. In his later years he would recall that, "as a young man I considered myself a liberal, because I was against lynching. When I got to Washington, to my surprise, I learned I was a conservative."

Methvin studied journalism at the University of Georgia School of Journalism. On campus he served as a member of the debate team and was a four-year letterman on UGA's football team under legendary coach, Wallace Butts. He belonged to Sigma Nu fraternity, and the Society of Professional Journalists, (Sigma Delta Chi), which named him the outstanding male graduate of 1955. He was also a member of Phi Beta Kappa, and worked briefly as a reporter on the Atlanta Constitution. He graduated with a Bachelor of Arts in Journalism degree, cum laude, with a supplementary major and postgraduate study in law at the University of Georgia School of Law. As a journalism student, Methvin admired the works of H.L. Mencken, doing a class project on Mencken's The American Mercury

After college, he enlisted in the U.S. Air Force. Methvin would spend three years as a jet fighter pilot flying the F-86 and F-102 all-weather interceptors.

== Journalism career ==
In 1958 he joined the Washington Daily News as a general assignment reporter. He did graduate study in philosophy and international relations at the Youngstown, American and George Washington Universities. In 1960 he joined the Reader's Digest Washington bureau, and served as associate editor and senior editor until 1996. He then retired from full-time staff and became a contributing editor until February 2002 when he ended his 42-year career with the magazine.

Methvin had a special interest for stories involving crime, corruption and the Cold War. Among Methvin's favorite targets was labor unions. “I consider myself fortunate to have been allowed to play the piccolo in the great parade of American democracy for nearly half a century,” Methvin wrote before his death. “During that time, the American people defeated and brought down two evil empires: the Teamsters Union and the Soviet Union, and I and my piccolo had a hand in both. That is enough for me.”

Methvin was the prime author of a series of hard-hitting Reader's Digest articles in 1970-72 that played a key role in shaping the federal government's war on organized crime. The proposed Organized Crime Control Act of 1970, including the famous "RICO" statute, was snugly corked in committee in Congress, and Chairman Emanuel Celler (D., N.Y.) of the House Judiciary Committee was determined to kill it there. But so much mail poured in to Congress as a result of two Methvin articles ("How the Mafia Preys on the Poor," September '70; and "The Mafia War on the A&P," July '70) that a discharged petition forced Celler to bring the legislation to the floor for a vote. "I've got to get that blankety-blank Reader's Digest off my back," he grumbled. When the bill passed overwhelmingly, 341 to 26, Sen. John McClellan, its chief architect, expressed his thanks to Methvin for his "especially significant contribution to the passage of this measure." And Attorney General John N. Mitchell sent him a pen used by President Richard Nixon to sign the bill, expressing the Administration's gratitude "for the part you played in bringing this important crime legislation into being." Ironically, three years later it was this law's limited testimonial immunity provision that enabled the Senate Watergate Committee to compel White House Counsel John Dean to testify, leading ultimately to Mitchell's subsequent imprisonment and President Nixon's resignation.

Methvin and the Digest were sued for $4 million by an organized crime figure named in one of his articles. After he presented his documentation and deposition on his investigation, a New York State judge dismissed the suit, declaring, "Documentation supplied by defendants showed they acted responsibly in extensively investigating all aspects of the story, which was imbued with legitimate public concern." Methvin declared he would have been happy to have the judge's ruling engraved on his tombstone.

Methvin also tackled the "religion" of Scientology in a 1980 article titled, "Scientology: Anatomy of a Frightening Cult".

His "swan song" was a July 2001 article about a rank-and-file crusader who helped break the back of a corrupt racketeering organization in the New York City employees union, American Federation of State, County and Municipal Employees Union District Council 37.

== Personal life ==
In 1959 Methvin married Barbara Lester of Byromville, Georgia, and the couple had two daughters, Helen and Claudia. Barbara was killed on March 31, 2000, by a speeding car as she crossed the road in front of their home. In 2011, he established the Methvin Distinguished Professorship in Southern Literature at the University of Georgia in her honor.
