= Osamu Matsubara =

Osamu Matsubara (松原 治, Matsubara Osamu; October 7, 1917 – January 3, 2012) was a Japanese businessman, business executive, and former chairman and CEO of Books Kinokuniya.

Matsubara was President of Kinokuniya Company Ltd., the parent company of Books Kinokuniya, from October 1980 to November 2002. In November 2002, he became the Chief Executive Office and board chairman for Kinokuniya Company Ltd. Outside Japan, Matsubara oversaw the 2007 relocation of Books Kinokuniya's New York City location from Rockefeller Center to a new, 23,800 sq. feet, three-floor store across from Bryant Park. The store, with its 250,000 items, is considered the largest Japanese bookstore in the United States. The inventory of the New York location includes an equal amount of Japanese and English books, which is in line with the company's goal to offer a wide assortment of titles in both Japanese and English.

Osamu Matsubara died from heart failure on January 3, 2012, at the age of 94.
