= Jack Roberts (climber) =

American rock and ice climber

Jack Roberts (May 29, 1952 – January 15, 2012) was an American rock and ice climber.

Roberts had climbed in Alaska, South America, and Europe in addition to the continental United States. He wrote on climbing and published the ice climbing guide Colorado Ice. Colorado Ice was originally published in 1998 and a revised and updated edition was issued in 2005.

On January 15, 2012, Roberts was climbing Bridal Veil Falls near Telluride, Colorado, and fell 60 feet. He suffered a heart attack and broken hip, and died on the scene after unsuccessful resuscitation attempts by a rescue team.
