= Massimo Baistrocchi =

Italian painter (1942–2012)

Massimo Baistrocchi (August 17, 1942 – January 22, 2012) was an Italian writer, artist, freelance journalist and diplomat who served as Italy's Ambassador to Namibia from 2001 to 2004, as well as Ambassador to Ghana, Togo, Nigeria, and Benin.

== Biography ==
Baistrocchi was born on August 17, 1942, in Karuizawa, Japan. He worked as journalist, and wrote articles for Italian and overseas magazines and other publications. His books and articles focused on numerous subjects, such as travel, culture and socio-economic issues. His books were often influenced by his diplomatic postings, including "Namibian Elegy," which included poems focusing on key Namibian geographical features, including the Spitzkoppe, the Orange River, the Fish River Canyon and Sossusvlei. In 2000 was edited his novel “Orme di sciamani” by Alberto Perdisa Editore - Bologna (ISBN 88-8372-044-X). He held art exhibitions around the world including Spain, Japan, South Korea, Ghana, Portugal, Egypt, and Hong Kong.

He joined the Ministry of Foreign Affairs as a press officer in 1970. He was appointed as Italian ambassador to Ghana and Togo in May 1996, holding that diplomatic post until 2001. Massimo Baistrocchi was appointed Ambassador to Namibia from 2001 to 2004. He was reportedly so fond of the country that he purchased a Namibian home. Baistrochhi returned to Italy following the end of his posting in Namibia, where he served as President of the Interministerial Commission for the Recovering of Works of Art. During the late 2000s, Baistrocchi was once again sent to Africa, serving first as Italy's ambassador to Nigeria and then as ambassador to Benin. He then retired from the diplomatic corp, but returned to their home in Windhoek, Namibia, once a year.

Baistrocchi died from a heart attack in Windhoek, Namibia, on January 22, 2012, at the age of 69. He was survived by his wife, Adriana, and his daughter Allegra. An exhibition of his art was held at the National Art Gallery of Namibia on January 27, 2012, as a tribute.
