= Charles Fecher =

American author and editor

Charles Fecher (November 1, 1917 – January 19, 2012) was an American author and editor who is best known for his works about Jacques Maritain and H.L. Mencken. Fecher also wrote about issues concerning the Catholic Church. He won awards from the Catholic Press Association in 1977 and 1978 for his weekly column entitled "Books in Review" which appeared in the Baltimore Catholic Review.

Fecher was born in Baltimore, Maryland, to Adam and Elizabeth Fecher. He married Muriel Burmeister in 1953. They had two children.

== Selected bibliography ==
- The Philosophy of Jacques Maritain (1953)
- Parish Council Committee Guide (1970)
- Mencken: A Study of His Thought (1978)
- The Diary of H. L. Mencken (editor, 1989)
