= Deepika Joshi-Shah =

Indian singer and actress

Deepali Joshi-Shah
- Born: 29 July 1975; Mumbai, Maharashtra, India
- Died: 27 January 2012 (aged 36); Kuwait
- Other name: Deepali Joshi
- Occupations: Singer; actress; voice actress

Deepali Joshi-Shah (29 July 1975 – 27 January 2012) was an Indian singer, actress and voice actress who spoke Hindi, Kannada, and Marathi.

== Early life ==
Deepali was born in Mumbai and did her early education at Atomic Energy Central School in Anushaktinagar. She started leaning Hindustani Classical Music at an early age from Pt. Dinkar Jadhav and then went to get a BA in music from SNDT University in Mumbai. She also began singing Hindi film songs and performing at various functions. She also won the mega finals of 'Awaaz ki Duniya' awarded by Khayyam sahab.

== Career ==
Deepali was a successful performing artist who had done many shows in India and abroad, including USA, Canada, Spain, and several other countries. Having given playback for films in Marathi, Gujrati, and Bhojpuri, she also did playback for a Hindi film "Kuch to gadbad hai" produced by Venus. She sang for an album produced by an Indian Television channel "E-24". She did voice overs for several jingles, testimonials and documentary films.

She gave Hindi-dubbed voices to roles in The Lord of the Rings.

== Death ==
At the age of 36, she was killed in a car crash and died in Kuwait, on the Friday night of 27 January 2012. The singer and her manager were on their way to a hotel from Kuwait International Airport after their arrival from Mumbai, India, when their car was hit by a speeding vehicle from behind off the Airport Road, wrecking one side of it and killing Shah on the spot. The driver of the car, an employee of the Al-Mulla Group, and a staff member were also injured in the accident. Al-Mulla Group was the official organizer of the show. She is survived by her husband, parents and an older sister.
