= Murder of Zubair Ahmed =

2012 murder in Dhaka, Bangladesh

- Part of Violence of Bangladesh Chhatra League
- Location: 23.8825°N 90.2482°E; Jahangirnagar University, Savar, Dhaka, Bangladesh
- Date: January 9, 2012; 14 years ago c. 12:00 am — 5:00 am (UTC+6)
- Target: Zubair Ahmed
- Attack type: Murder
- Perpetrators: See the § List of accused section
- No. of participants: 14 (Note: As per the wanted poster issued by Jahangirnagar University.)
- Motive: Power struggle

The murder of Zubair Ahmed took place on 9 January 2012, at Jahangirnagar University in Savar, Bangladesh. Zubair Ahmed, a student of the university’s English Department, was attacked by members of the Bangladesh Chhatra League (BCL) during a conflict between rival factions of the organization. He later succumbed to his injuries.

Thirteen BCL members were charged in connection with the murder. In 2015, five were sentenced to death, and six received life imprisonment. The university also took disciplinary action against several students involved.

== Background ==
Zubair Ahmed was a second-year student in the English Department at Jahangirnagar University, belonging to the 37th batch. He was a residential student of Bangabandhu Sheikh Mujibur Rahman Hall and was originally from Kalapara Upazila of Patuakhali District.

Prior to the incident, Ahmed was associated with a faction of the Bangladesh Chhatra League (BCL) led by Rashedul Islam Shafin, former president of the suspended hall committee. In early 2011, tensions escalated between factions within BCL following an anti-terrorism rally.

On 2 February 2011, the Shafin-led group was evicted from the hall by police and university administration, and the opposing faction, led by Shamim and Sharif, assumed control. This faction was reportedly aligned with the then-vice chancellor Shariff Enamul Kabir. The conflict between the two factions continued, eventually leading to the attack on Ahmed in January 2012.

== Murder ==
On 8 January 2012, a group of 12 to 16 second-year students from Rafiq-Jabbar Hall, led by Ishtiaq Mehboob Arup, attacked Ahmed on the campus of Jahangirnagar University. Ahmed, who was affiliated with a rival faction of the Bangladesh Chhatra League, sustained fatal injuries in the assault.

He was initially taken to Enam Medical College Hospital in Savar, and later transferred to United Hospital in Dhaka. He succumbed from his injuries in the early hours of 9 January 2012.

The attack occurred amid ongoing conflict between two BCL factions on campus. According to police, the assailants may have been motivated by revenge, having previously been subjected to ragging by first-year students.

== Aftermath ==
=== Protests ===
The murder triggered widespread protests across Jahangirnagar University. A section of the Bangladesh Chhatra League, along with other student organizations, general students, and faculty members, united to initiate an anti-violence movement under the banner “Jahangirnagar Against Terrorism”. The movement was organized by Soumya Joydeep, then-president of the Student Union.

At a press conference held at Dhaka Reporters Unity, a group of university faculty members, under the banner of the Teachers' Society, called for a judicial investigation into the murder.

On 15 January 2012, students organized a protest rally and a torch procession with four principal demands. On 9 January 2014, a day-long solidarity gathering, photo exhibition, and cultural protest program were held on campus at the base of the Shahid Minar. These events were again organized under the banner of “Jahangirnagar Against Terrorism”.

One year later, on 9 January 2015, Anti-Terrorism Day was observed with a photo exhibition, a candlelight vigil, protest rallies, and screening of a documentary on campus violence.

Protesters accused the group within the Bangladesh Chhatra League allegedly responsible for the murder of having close ties to then Vice-Chancellor Shariff Enamul Kabir. Professor Nasim Akhtar Hossain, convener of the Teachers' Society, criticized the administration, stating that many of the accused were still present on campus and the authorities had failed to take action despite being aware of their presence.

In response to the protests from students and faculty, several university officials resigned from their positions, including Vice-Chancellor Sharif Enamul Kabir, Security Officer Azim Uddin, Proctor Arju Mia, and other members of the Proctorial Committee.

The university’s legal officer, Mahtab Uzz Zahid, stated that the institution had "fully cooperated with the investigating bodies regarding testimony and evidence, and expressed hope that the court would deliver the maximum penalty to those found guilty".

=== Reactions ===
Years following the murder, Ahmed's family expressed "deep disappointment" over the slow progress of the case. His elder brother, a faculty member at Leading University in Sylhet, stated that the university administration had been uncooperative when approached for information related to the case.

He further criticized law enforcement, saying, "No new suspects have been arrested in the case, and even after such a long time, the police still claim that the accused are absconding. It's clear there is a lack of effort on their part".

On 9 January 2023, at a gathering organized by “Jahangirnagar Against Terrorism”, Professor Raihan Rain commented on the lack of accountability and the ineffectiveness of the justice system, stating, "The punishment given to Zubair's murderers is equivalent to that for killing a bird".

== Judicial proceeding ==
=== Investigation and charges ===
Following the murder, the then-registrar of Jahangirnagar University, Hamidur Rahman, filed a first information report at the Ashulia Police Station against unidentified individuals. Police officer Mir Shaheen Shah Parvez was assigned as the investigating officer.

On 8 April 2012, a charge sheet was submitted to the Dhaka Magistrate Court, accusing 13 students from the university's 37th batch. Trial proceedings formally began on 8 September 2012. Due to slow progress, the case was transferred to Dhaka’s Speedy Trial Tribunal-4 on 13 August 2013. Tribunal Judge ABM Nizamul Haque ordered the prompt initiation of the trial.

=== List of accused ===
A total of 13 individuals were charged in connection with the murder. All of them were second-year students from the 37th batch of Jahangirnagar University, residing in Rafiq-Jabbar Hall at the time of the incident.

| Accused | Department | Verdict | Current status |
|---|---|---|---|
| Shafiul Alam Setu | Statistics | Life imprisonment | |
| Abhinandan Kundu Offy | Statistics | Life imprisonment | |
| Ashikul Islam Ashik | Zoology | Death sentence | Fugitive (Note: Fled to Malaysia) |
| Khan Muhammad Riaz Sohan | Zoology | Death sentence | Fugitive |
| Jahid Hasan | Zoology | Death sentence | |
| Kamruzzaman Sohag | Philosophy | Life imprisonment | |
| Ishtiaq Mehboob Arup | Philosophy | Life imprisonment | Fugitive |
| Rashedul Islam Raju | Philosophy | Death sentence | |
| Mahbub Akram | Political science | Death sentence | Fugitive |
| Mahmudul Hasan | History | Acquitted | |
| Mazharul Islam | History | Life imprisonment | |
| Nazmus Saqib Topu | Microbiology | Life imprisonment | |
| Nazmul Hasan Plabon | Public Administration | Acquitted | |

=== Trial ===
During the investigation, four individuals were arrested and gave confessional statements in court. Zahid Hasan was the first to be arrested and was placed on a three-day remand. By 13 February 2014, testimonies were recorded from 10 of the 37 listed prosecution witnesses, including the former pro-vice-chancellor of the university, Md. Farhad Hossain.

On 19 January 2014, six of the accused allegedly threatened two students, Syed Nazmul Hossain and Rajibul Islam, who had been participating in protests organised following the murder. The two students filed a general diary entry at Kotwali Police Station.

On 6 February 2014, the tribunal ordered the accused to explain why their bail should not be revoked. On February 23, the bail of four accused was cancelled, but all four escaped from the courtroom due to negligence by court authorities.

By 28 November 2014, 27 witnesses had completed their testimony. On that date, only two of the accused were present in court; the others remained fugitives and had not yet been re-arrested.

=== Verdict ===
The verdict in the case was delayed multiple times. It was initially scheduled for 4 February 2015, but postponed, leading to student protests on campus. The final verdict was delivered on 8 February 2015, where five individuals were sentenced to death, and six others received life imprisonment. On the day of the verdict, only five convicts were present in court, while the rest were absconding.

During the pronouncement of the judgment, the presiding judge remarked:

The murder is a consequence of unethical activities among student organizations in public universities.
— Judge ABM Nizamul Haque, presiding judge

This was the first case in which a Bangladeshi public university murder trial resulted in the maximum penalty for the convicted. However, as of January 2024, the verdict had not yet been implemented.

=== Appeals ===
The appeal hearings began on January 2, 2018, in the Appellate Division. Najmul Hasan Plabon and Mahmudul Hasan Masud were acquitted due to lack of evidence. At that time, only seven of the original thirteen accused were in custody. On January 24, four additional defendants, Mazharul Islam, Shafiul Alam, Kamruzzaman, and Abhinandan Kundu, were also acquitted during the appeal proceedings.

== See also ==
- Murder of Abrar Fahad
