= Moisés Kaiman =

- Born: 1913; Szczuczyn, Poland
- Died: 22 January 2012 (aged 98–99); Monterrey, México
- Occupation: Rabbi
- Spouse: Sarah Dublin

Rabbi Moisés (Moshe) Kaiman (1913 – 22 January 2012) was the rabbi for the Jewish community of Monterrey, Mexico, from 1944 until his death in 2012. Besides his rabbinical duties, he acted as a liaison between the local Jewish community and the city's religious and political figures. He was a contributor to several newspapers and published six books.

== Biography ==
Born in Szczuczyn, Poland, in an observant Jewish family, he became known for his knowledge and oratory. At 13, he left his home to study at the Rabbinical Seminary in Bialystock. According to anecdotes, his teachers and classmates used to call him "Moshe the sage". At 18, he graduated and received the title of rabbi.

Kaiman fled Europe during World War II. His parents and siblings, and his wife's family, were murdered by the Nazis at the Auschwitz concentration camp.

In 1941, Kaiman arrived in Cuba, where he was hired as a rabbi. His children were born while he worked there. In 1944 he moved to Monterrey in Mexico, after a friend from his hometown of Szczuszyn convinced him to work as the rabbi of the small local Jewish community there.

Given the small size and limited resources of the community, he not only performed the duties of rabbi, but had to take on other tasks including hazzan, mohel, shochet and teacher. He was the rabbi of Monterrey for 68 years, making him the longest serving rabbi in the world. He became a Mexican citizen in 1993.

From his arrival, he formed a cordial relationship with members of other religions and of the local community in general, and promoted peaceful co-existence and inter-religious dialog. He formed a close friendship with Archbishop and Cardinal Adolfo Suárez Rivera, who referred to him as "brother". He maintained friendly ties with his successor Cardinal Francisco Robles, who subsequently became Archbishop of Guadalajara. He was part of the committee that received Pope John Paul II on both of his visits to the city, and received a thank you note from the Vatican for the Hebrew Bible he gave the Pope as a present.

Between 1993 and 2006, he wrote a popular weekly column Desde la Sinagoga (From the Synagogue), in a local newspaper El Norte with advice on daily life. From 2007 to 2009, he wrote "Cartas de la Sinagoga" (Letters from the Synagogue) for the same newspaper. He also collaborated with El Porvenir and El Diario de Monterrey, and for the New York-based Algemeiner Journal.

== Published works ==
Rabbi Kaiman wrote six books:

- Consejos bíblicos para la familia Mexicana (Biblical Advice for the Mexican Family)
- ¿Cuál es el buen camino? (What is the Good Road?)
- ¿Quién no quiere vivir bien? (Who Doesn't Want to Live Well?)
- La estrella de David (The Star of David)
- Amarás a tu prójimo como a ti mismo (Love Thy Neighbor as Thyself)
- Todos somos hijos de un solo Dios (We are all Children of the Same God)

== Awards ==
- Medalla al Mérito Diego de Montemayor (Shield of Merit Diego de Montemayor), given by the City of Monterrey in 1993
- Medalla al Mérito Cívico Presea Estado de Nuevo León (Shield of Civic Merit State of Nuevo León), given by the State Government in 2005
- A plaza in Parque Fundidora bears his name since 2009 as an initiative of the Consejo Interreligioso de Nuevo León (Nuevo León Inter-religious Council)
- Decano del Consejo Interreligioso del Gobierno del Estado de Nuevo León (Dean of the Inter-religious Council of the Government of the State of Nuevo León)

== Bibliography ==
- Ana Portnoy (8 December 2009). "Reconocen al Rabino Moisés Kaiman. Por su ecumenismo, dedican plaza del Parque Fundidora a líder judío". Gusto por la historia (in Spanish).
- Félix Barrón (22 January 2012). "Recuerdan su fe, amor y sabiduría". El Norte (in Spanish).
