= Rafael Rincón González =

Venezuelan musician (1922–2012)

- Born: September 30, 1922; Maracaibo, Zulia state, Venezuela
- Died: January 15, 2012 (aged 89)
- Occupation: musician
- Known for: more than 600 songs
- Notable work: Pregones Zulianos
- Awards: his compositions are the musical patrimony of the Zulia state

Rafael Rincón González (30 September 1922–15 January 2012) was a Venezuelan musician. He is a composer of more than 600 songs, including “Pregones Zulianos," which was recorded by the Royal Philharmonic Orchestra. He was named to the orders of San Sebastián and Diego de Losada (1997). On August 23, 1993, his compositions were determined to be the musical patrimony of the Zulia state.

== See also ==
- Venezuela
- Venezuelan music
