= Petros Karatroupkos =

Petros Karatroupkos (1929 – January 31, 2012) was the Greek Orthodox bishop of Zambia 2001–2003.
