= Kenneth Andrews (historian) =

British historian

Kenneth Raymond Andrews, FBA (26 August 1921 – 6 January 2012) was a British historian. He was Professor of History at the University of Hull from 1979 to 1988.

A specialist in the history of English exploration, Andrews was known for his work on Elizabethan privateers, in particular Sir Francis Drake.
