= Miloš Pojar =

Miloš Pojar (1940 – 23 January 2012) was a Czech (and Czechoslovak prior to 1993) historian, writer and diplomat. Pojar oversaw the establishment of diplomatic relations between the former Czechoslovakia and Israel following the Velvet Revolution. He became the first Czech ambassador to Israel following the revolution. Pojar served as ambassador from 1990 until 1994. His son, Tomáš Pojar, currently serves as the Ambassador of the Czech Republic to Israel, as of February 2012.

The majority of Pojar's books and articles focused on Jewish history and themes, though the government of Communist Czechoslovakia forbid him from publishing his work from 1970 until 1990. After returning from Israel, Pojar became the director of the Jewish Museum in Prague's Educational and Cultural Center in the 1990s and a lecturer at the New York University's Prague campus.

His last book, completed shortly before his death, explored the relationship between Tomáš Garrigue Masaryk and the Jewish people.

Pojar died at a hospital in Prague on 23 January 2012 at the age of 71.
