= Giuseppe Vedovato =

Italian politician (1912–2012)

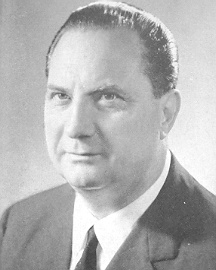
Giuseppe Vedovato

Giuseppe Vedovato (13 March 1912 – 18 January 2012) was an Italian politician. He was born in Greci.

He lost his father in the First World War in 1916 and his mother in 1924. In 1930 he joined the Royal Higher Institute of Social and Political Sciences "Cesare Alfieri". In 1937 he was appointed chief editor of the Rivista di studi politici internazionali (International Journal of Political Studies), founded three years earlier. In 1951 he was elected provincial councillor for the Christian Democrats and in 1953 he became a deputy, going on to become a senator, a position he held until 1976.

He was head of the Christian Democrat group and then president of the Parliamentary Assembly of the Council of Europe from 1972 to 1975. The Assembly made him an honorary president in 2003.

He was also President of the Italian Association of Former Members of Parliament. Vedovato was Professor Emeritus of history at the University of Rome "La Sapienza". He amassed a large library of political and theological works which he donated to the Council of Europe in 1987, and then repatriated to Italy when the Council of Europe closed its library in 2007. He is the author of several books and numerous articles.

== Bibliography ==
- The question of the administration of Italian colonies in Africa under trusteeship (1947)
- Politica Estera Italiana E Scelta Europea (1979)
- La Hongrie vers l'Europe: de la vocation a l'intégration (1998)
- Storia Della CISL Di Venezia: 1950-1968 (2004)
