= Albert Baskakov =

Russian scientist (1928–2012)

Альберт Павлович Баскаков
- Born: March 1, 1930; Tver Oblast
- Died: January 21, 2012 (aged 81); Yekaterinburg
- Education: Moscow Power Engineering Institute
- Scientific career
- Fields: Heat treating

Albert Pavlovich Baskakov (Russian: Альберт Павлович Баскаков; 1 March 1928 - 21 January 2012) was a Soviet and Russian scientist in the field of heat treating and a professor of thermophysics.

== Early life ==
Albert Pavlovich Baskakov was born in 1930 in Tver Oblast, Russia.

In 1950, Baskakov graduated from the Faculty of Energo Mashinostroitelnythe of the Moscow Power Engineering Institute. After his graduation he remained at the institute to work and continue his studies, receiving the title of candidate of science.

== Career ==
Baskakov moved to the Ural Polytechnic Institute, where he worked as an Assistant Professor (1956-1964), Head of the Department (1964-1998), Professor (1998-2011) and Professor Consultant (2011-2012). From 1961 to 1963, he was responsible for the research laboratory of the Ural Branch of the USSR Academy of Sciences. In 1964, Baskakov became the head of the department of industrial heat and power engineering. His primary field of scientific interest was thermophysics: namely, the combustion and the use of solid fuels.

While at Ural State Technical University, Baskakov created a scientific school on the study of fluidized systems and heat treatment of metals in a fluidized bed. In the 1980s, he developed a process of heat treatment of parts that was adopted by many enterprises of the defense industry of the USSR.

Baskakov led the construction of the first 10 MW Russia boiler with a circulating fluidized bed installed on a coal mine in Tulgan.

== Recognition ==
Throughout 1980s and 1990s, he received awards, including: fellowship of the RSFSR (1988), the N. A. Markevich NTO Mashpom the USSR (1983), and the top prize for the European Union's competition for energy savings at its Energy Centre (1995).

Baskakov authored 15 textbooks and monographs and published over 600 journal articles, conference presentations and patients.

== Death ==
Baskakov died on January 21, 2012.

== Publications ==
- "Heat-energy basis of high-speed acid-free heating and thermal treatment in the fluidized bed"
