= Angela von den Driesch =

German archaeologist and veterinarian

Prof. Dr. Angela von den Driesch
- Born: Angela Felicitas Karpf; 11 July 1934; Dresden, Germany
- Died: 4 January 2012 (aged 77); Munich, Germany
- Education: LMU Munich
- Known for: A Guide to the Measurement of Animal Bones from Archaeological Sites (1976)
- Spouse: Karl von den Driesch (m. 1966)
- Scientific career
- Fields: Zooarchaeology; History of veterinary medicine
- Institutions: Institut für Paläoanatomie, Domestikationsforschung und Geschichte der Tiermedizin; LMU Munich
- Theses: Anatomical study of the inner lymphatic system of the testicle (Dr. med. vet., 1963); Osteoarchäologische Untersuchungen auf der Iberischen Halbinsel (Dr. habil., 1970)

Angela von den Driesch (11 July 1934 – 4 January 2012) was a German archaeologist and veterinarian. She was a professor and director of the Institut für Paläoanatomie, Domestikationsforschung und Geschichte der Tiermedizin at LMU Munich.

== Education and career ==
Angela Felicitas Karpf was born on 11 July 1934 in Dresden, but her family moved to Tegernsee, Bavaria after the Second World War. She studied at the Ludwig-Maximilians-Universität München (now LMU Munich) and the University of Zurich, first reading Romance languages, then veterinary medicine. She was awarded the degree of Doctor Medicinae Veterinariae by LMU Munich in 1963 for her thesis on the lymphatic system of the testicle. She married Karl von den Driesch in 1966.

In 1965, Angela von den Driesch joined Munich's newly founded Institut für Paläoanatomie, Domestikationsforschung und Geschichte der Tiermedizin (Institute for Palaeoanatomy, Domestication Research and the History of Veterinary Medicine), directed by Joachim Boessneck. She completed her habilitation thesis, on the osteoarchaeology of the Iberian Peninsula, in 1970. She was made a university professor in 1978 and succeeded Boessnick as the director of the Institute for Palaeoanatomy in 1991. On her retirement in 1999, she managed to persuade the university not to close the institute, and as of 2019 was the only combined Lehrstuhl in palaeoanatomy and veterinary history in Germany.

== Legacy ==
A festschrift in von den Driesch's honour, Historia animalium ex ossibus, was edited by Cornelia Becker, Henriette Manhart, Joris Peters, and Jörg Schibler and published in 1999. Thirty-seven papers were contributed in German, English and French. On her death, an international symposium in her memory was held at Koç University in Istanbul.

Von den Driesch began building a reference collection of vertebrate bones when she joined the Institute for Palaeoanatomy in the 1960s, which grew to become one of the largest osteological collections in the world. At the time of her death in 2012, it contained over 20,000 specimens representing 2,700 taxa. When she retired in 1999, von den Driesch arranged for the collection to be given to the Bavarian state. It was later merged with the state anthropological collection and is now known as the Bavarian State Collection for Anthropology and Palaeoanatomy (Staatssammlung für Anthropologie und Paläoanatomie).
