= Erik Haaest =

Danish journalist, author and holocaust denier

- Born: Erik Hansen; 14 March 1935; Toftegaard, Hundslev, Kølstrup, Denmark
- Died: 23 January 2012 (aged 76)
- Occupations: Journalist and author
- Known for: Books on Danish pro-Nazi collaborators

Erik Haaest (14 March 1935 – 23 January 2012) was a controversial Danish journalist and author.

On 18 July 2007 the newspaper Information wrote that Haaest in September 1977 had published a pamphlet asserting that the Nazi concentration camp gas chambers never existed and that the Diary of Anne Frank was a forgery. This caused the Danish Arts Council to be condemned since it had funded Haaest's research into Danes who had served in the SS. Information subsequently brought a retort from Haaest where he claimed to have been deliberately misquoted and referred to the allegations as an outrageous lie made to discredit and sabotage his authorship regarding Danish pro-Nazi collaborators.
