= Mukarram Khan Atif =

Pakistani journalist

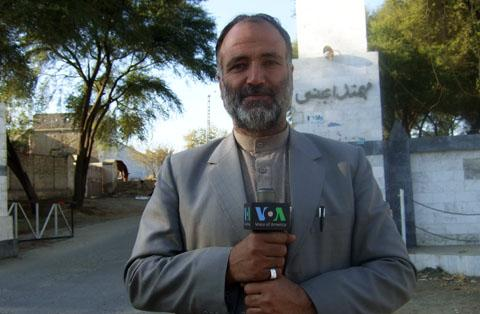
Mukarram Khan Atif

Mukarram Khan Atif (died 17 January 2012) was a Pakistani journalist and reporter working for Dunya News and Deewa Radio. He was killed in Pakistan on 17 January 2012 by the Tehrik-i-Taliban Pakistan because of his anti-Taliban reporting. He was the first reporter killed in Pakistan in 2012.

== Personal life ==
Mukarram Khan Atif had one wife and no children. He had arrangements to marry a second wife in February 2012. He had two brothers, the younger one named Muslim Khan. Mukarram Khan Atif and his family were native to the Mohmand tribal region. They were relocated after receiving threats from militants to Shabqadar, a subdivision of the Charsadda district roughly 15 miles north of Peshawar.

== Career ==
Mukarram Khan Atif was a reporter for Dunya TV and Deewa Radio, a Pashto language radio channel of the Voice of America's Pashto language service. He had been working for Deewa Radio since 2006. Atif was also the President of the Mohmand Agency Press Club.

Safiullah, the bureau chief of Dunya TV, stated that Atif was a pleasant, hard worker. David Ensor, director for Voice of America, stated "Atif risked his life on a daily basis to provide his audience with fair and balanced news from this critical region and we mourn the loss of our colleague." Atif was trained to educate journalists on how to protect themselves.

== Death ==
On 17 January 2012 Mukarram Khan Atif was praying in a mosque near Peshawar after sunset. Local police officers told reporters that two armed men came in and killed him with several shots, some to the head. They fled on motorcycles. Nasruminallah, an Imam at the mosque, was also injured in the attack.

Atif was taken to Lady Reading Hospital in Peshawar where Rahim Jan, a senior doctor, stated that he was dead before he arrived.

His funeral prayer was offered on the Subhan Khur high school grounds. Police were present to avert any unwanted actions at the funeral and burial grounds. Despite the fears of attack, many different people, including members of Tribal Union of Journalists and journalists from Peshawar, attended the funeral. No government officials attended. Atif was buried in Akhwand Zafar Baba graveyard of Shabqadar.

=== Tehrik-i-Taliban claim responsibility ===
Ehsanullah Ehsan, a spokesperson for the Tehrik-i-Taliban Pakistan, claimed responsibility for Atif's murder. In a telephone conversation with Peshawar journalists, Ehsan stated "We have been warning him to stop his propaganda against us in the foreign media. He did not include our version in his stories."

== Reactions ==
Many people condemned Mukarram Khan Atif's murder. The list includes:

- The United States embassy in Pakistan.
  - On 18 January 2012 The United States Embassy in Pakistan condemned Atif's murder stating .Mr. Atif's reporting on security and extremism from the tribal belt brought to light the threat extremism poses to the peace and stability of Pakistan and the region.. We admire his commitment to finding the truth wherever it led him, in accordance with the highest principles of his profession. We urge a full and transparent investigation that identifies the culprits of this crime and brings them to justice. The United States stands in solidarity with the journalists of Pakistan. A free and open press is the best guarantee of the freedom and security of the Pakistani people."
- Irina Bokova, Director-General of the United Nations Educational, Scientific and Cultural Organisation (UNESCO).
- Tanvir Shahzad, president of the Electronic Media Reporters Association
  - Shahzad asked the government to take action against those responsible. He stated that "Atif's death is irreparable loss; he was a brave and dedicated journalist."
- Dr. Firdous Ashiq Aawan, Minister for Information and Broadcasting
- Tariq Chaudhry, acting president for Pakistan Federal Union of Journalist and Secretary General Amin Yousuf

In response to Atif's death, Reporters Without Borders stated "The Pakistani authorities must at all costs take action to protect journalists, especially those who are subjected to threats. Otherwise, there will be no improvement in conditions."
