= Johann Carl Vogel =

Johann Carl Vogel FRSSAf
- Born: 7 September 1932; Pretoria, South Africa
- Died: 30 January 2012 (aged 79)
- Education: University of Pretoria, Heidelberg University
- Known for: isotope physicist
- Spouse: Ursula Weidemann
- Scientific career
- Workplaces: Council for Scientific and Industrial Research
- Doctoral advisor: Otto Haxel

Johann Carl "John" Vogel (7 September 1932 – 30 January 2012) was a South African isotope physicist with a specific interest in archeology for which he used radiocarbon dating to establish timeframes.

== Career ==
Vogel was born on 7 September 1932 in Pretoria. He obtained a BSc in chemistry in 1951, and a MSc in 1955, both from the University of Pretoria. He moved to Germany to study at Heidelberg University where he obtained a doctorate under Otto Haxel in 1959. The subject of his thesis was determination of carbon isotope fractionation factors.

In 1961 Vogel wanted to move back to South Africa, but there being no suitable job available for him he instead moved to the Netherlands and obtained the position of head of the Radiocarbon Dating Laboratory at the University of Groningen. The position had become available after the death of Hessel de Vries. Vogel later became a professor of isotope geology at Groningen.

In 1967 Vogel returned to South Africa and set up a laboratory at the Council for Scientific and Industrial Research in Pretoria. Vogel was head of the Quaternary Dating Research Unit until 1997, when he retired. During his career he developed techniques for dating unburnt bone and contributed to radiocarbon dating programmes.

From 1986 to 1988 he was President of the South African Archaeological Society. In 1988, Vogel received the De Beers Gold Medal from the South African Institute of Physics in 1988. He was a Fellow of the Royal Society of South Africa.

Vogel was married to Ursula Weidemann, a professor of Ancient History at the University of South Africa. He died on 30 January 2012.
