= Helmi Höhle =

German fencer (1924–2012)

Personal information
- Born: 13 October 1924 Offenbach am Main, Germany
- Died: 30 January 2012 (aged 87)
- Height: 1.66 m (5 ft 5 in)
- Weight: 64 kg (141 lb)

Sport
- Sport: Fencing
- Club: FC Offenbach
Medal record
Representing West Germany
World Fencing Championships
Silver medal – second place	1957 Paris	Team foil
Silver medal – second place	1958 Philadelphia	Team foil
Bronze medal – third place	1959 Budapest	Team foil

Helmi Höhle (13 October 1924 – 30 January 2012) was a German fencer. She finished in fourth place with the German foil team at the 1960 Summer Olympics. She won three medals in this event at the world championships in 1957–1959.
