= Hermano Pablo =

Puerto Rican Christian evangelist

- Born: Paul Edwin Finkenbinder; September 24, 1921; Santurce, Puerto Rico
- Died: January 27, 2012 (aged 90); Irvine, California
- Education: Zion Bible Institute; Central Bible College
- Occupation: Evangelist
- Years active: 1942–1997
- Organization: Hermano Pablo Ministries
- Website: message2conscience.com

Paul Edwin Finkenbinder, known as Hermano Pablo (September 24, 1921 – January 27, 2012) was a Puerto Rican Christian evangelist who was involved in radio and television evangelical broadcasting in Latin America. He created and for many years ran the program "Un mensaje a la conciencia" ("A Message to the Conscience"). He and his wife Linda traveled extensively across Latin America conducting seminars, conferences and evangelistic crusades.

== Early years ==
Finkenbinder was the son of Frank and Aura Finkenbinder, both missionaries, and was born in Santurce, Puerto Rico. He grew up speaking both English and Spanish. He studied at Zion Bible Institute in East Providence, Rhode Island and at Central Bible College in Springfield, Missouri. He married his wife Linda in 1942, and was ordained by the Assemblies of God in 1947.

== El Salvador ==
After a short time in New Mexico, Finkenbinder and his wife moved to El Salvador in 1942. He began a radio ministry, Latin American Radio Evangelism, in 1955, and in 1960 added a television program, which reportedly had 100,000 weekly viewers in El Salvador.

== California ==
After 21 years of living and evangelizing in El Salvador, Finkenbinder and his family relocated to Costa Mesa, California, where they established the ministry headquarters in 1964. He would remain in California for the duration of his life, although he continued to travel extensively throughout Latin America in support of crusades and special evangelistic events. After a dispute relating to interdenominational organizations, he withdrew from the Assemblies of God in 1972, but returned to the denomination in 1988.

He received an honorary doctorate from Southern California College in Costa Mesa (now Vanguard University of Southern California) in 1993.

In 1997 the program was reported to air "on more than 2,000 radio stations and in more than 27 countries". Around that time, Finkenbinder decided to retire from the ministry, which was taken over by Charles Ray Stewart and his wife, also named Linda. The ministry states that all the airtime on both radio and television are donated, and estimates that the current value of radio and TV airtime donated has been as high as $64 million.

== Death ==
On January 25, 2012, Finkenbinder and his wife celebrated their 70th wedding anniversary. Later in the evening, however, he complained of a severe headache, and he was taken to the hospital where he slipped into a coma. He died in the morning hours of January 27, 2012.
