= Kaoru Nishimoto =

Japanese shogi player

- Native name: 西本馨
- Born: August 10, 1923
- Hometown: Fukushima-ku, Osaka
- Died: January 14, 2012 (aged 88)

Career
- Achieved professional status: 1948 (aged 24–25)
- Badge Number: 52
- Rank: 7 dan
- Retired: November 17, 1989 (40–41 years)
- Teacher: Kinjirō Kimi

Websites
- JSA profile page

Kaoru Nishimoto (西本 馨, Nishimoto Kaoru) (1923, Osaka – January 14, 2012, Maizuru, Kyoto) was a Japanese professional shogi player. His shogi teacher was Kinjiro Kimi.

Nishimoto impaired visibility in his high school days at playing baseball. Having severe visible impairment, he aimed to be a shogi player. He became a student of Kimi in 1940 and was promoted to 4dan, the lowest professional rank in 1948.

His visible impairment hindered him to play shogi, even though he was accompanied by an assistant during play. He lost his visibility in 1962 completely. In 1959, he was disqualified to play at Ranking tournament C2 class and played for free at Shoreikai until his retirement.

He died on January 14, 2012, aged 88, after a battle with pneumonia.
