= Andrzej Krzysztof Wróblewski =

Polish journalist

- Born: 2 July 1935; Wilno, Polish Republic
- Died: 13 January 2012 (aged 76)

Andrzej Krzysztof Wróblewski (born as Andrzej Krzysztof Fejgin 2 July 1935 – 13 January 2012) was a Polish journalist.

Born into a Jewish family. Wróblewski worked for many years at Polityka, which he left in 1982, and for the Trójka radio station. After the end of the Martial law in Poland, he was editor of Gazeta Bankowa. He returned to Polityka in 1996.

Wróblewski retired in 2004.
