= F. Elwood Davis =

American lawyer (1915–2012)

F. Elwood Davis (December 15, 1915 – January 17, 2012) was a prominent Washington, D.C. lawyer, civic leader, and philanthropist.

== Early years ==
Frank Elwood Davis was born in Washington, D.C., to Leonard H. Davis and Annie (McCarthy) Davis, he attended McKinley Technology High School. Following graduation, Davis worked at Riggs National Bank for a few years before enrolling at George Washington University. While at GW, he excelled at tennis, later being inducted into their Athletic Hall of Fame. Upon completion of his undergraduate education, Davis entered the GW Law School, earning his law degree in 1943. On September 19, 1942, he married Eleanor Grunwell of Arlington, Virginia.

== Naval service ==
Following graduation, Davis was called to duty in the U.S. Navy, reporting to Naval Air Station Quonset Point, Rhode Island where he was assigned to CASU-22 (Carrier Aircraft Service Unit). Later, Davis was assigned to the aircraft carrier USS Vella Gulf (CVE-111) where he served as the Navigation Officer, Assistant to the Executive Officer and the ship's legal officer. Davis served aboard Vella Gulf during operations in the Mariana Islands and Okinawa and the post-war occupation of Tokyo. He was discharged from the Navy in 1946.

== Law and civic career ==
After the war Davis returned to Riggs Bank where he worked in its Trust Department until he and C. Dean Reasoner started their own law firm of Reasoner & Davis. Later, Fred Vinson joined the firm as a partner forming Reasoner, Davis & Vinson.

The firm was extremely successful and before long Davis was representing Riggs Bank, George Washington University, Peoples Drug Store and Lincoln National Bank to name only a few. Despite his hectic legal practice, Davis allowed time to pursue another passion—service to his beloved city, Washington D.C.

Davis found an opportunity to serve the district by joining the Downtown Washington Junior Chamber of Commerce (Jaycees), becoming its president in June 1948. He also became a member of the Greater Washington Board of Trade (BOT), an influential organization charged with promoting business opportunities and cooperation between business, civic and government leaders in the Metro D.C. area. A longstanding and important issue of the time for D.C. residents was representation in Congress and voting rights in national elections. Davis willingly stepped into the fray and as chairman of the Citizens Joint Committee on National Representation for the District of Columbia, spearheaded the drive to gain passage of the Twenty-third Amendment to the United States Constitution. Presenting the case to state legislators and the House Judiciary subcommittee, Davis argued convincingly that the time had come for D.C. residents to be able to vote in Presidential elections. On March 29, 1961, after ratification by the Congress and 38 states, the 23rd Amendment became law and D.C. Residents were able to vote for the first time in the 1964 Presidential election.

Propelled by earlier civic achievements and his stewardship in the passage of the 23rd Amendment, Davis became president of the Board of Trade in 1965. In this capacity, Davis aggressively took on the important issues facing the city. He was a strong advocate of building another bridge across the Potomac River (Three Sisters (District of Columbia) Bridge) to improve access to the city, he helped develop a citywide initiative to fight crime and he ushered in a regional compact between the District and adjacent states resulting in the formation of the Washington Metropolitan Area Transit Authority (WMATA). He also breathed life into a struggling Dulles Airport by providing BOT funds for airport marketing activities—a practice which continued for ten years. On the issue of District of Columbia Home Rule (self-government), the Davis-led BOT took an unpopular stand against it. He believed that without fiscal safeguards provided by the Federal Government, Home Rule was doomed to failure. Davis was the earliest voice to argue for an automatic Federal Payment formula that would give the District a solid financial foundation. In 1991, the District of Columbia Budget Efficiency Act was passed into law establishing a predictable and equitable method for determining the amount of the annual Federal Payment to the District.

Davis practiced law until the age of 88 and remained active in civic and charitable organizations. He was President of the Greater Washington Boys and Girls Club, Kiwanis of Greater Washington, Walter A. Bloedorn Foundation, Friendly Sons of St. Patrick and the Burning Tree Club. Further, he was Chairman of the Washington Convention and Visitors Bureau and the District Bar Association.

== Awards ==
In 1955 Davis received the Washingtonian Award given by the Junior Chamber of Commerce for outstanding service contributions to the community. In 1961 he was awarded the Distinguished Service Medal by the Cosmopolitan Club for his outstanding community service in spearheading the drive for passage of the 23rd Amendment. In 1970 he was given a Testimonial by the Washington Convention and Visitors Bureau for his 25 years of service to the community. Davis was also honored by the Scottish Rite of Freemasonry, a fraternal organization, with the title Master Mason 33rd degree.

Davis had a long association with his alma mater, George Washington University and its law school. He served as general counsel and later was honorary member of the university's board of trustees and the recipient of the GW Presidential Medal. The law school established the F. Elwood and Eleanor Davis Professorship through an endowment from the Davis family.

== Personal life ==
Davis died in 2012 in Washington, D.C., where he is buried at the Oak Hill Cemetery next to his wife of 67 years, Eleanor (Grunwell). The Davises had three children; Robert Elwood, Anne Louise and Lynne Lockwood.
