= Oenophilia =

Love of wine

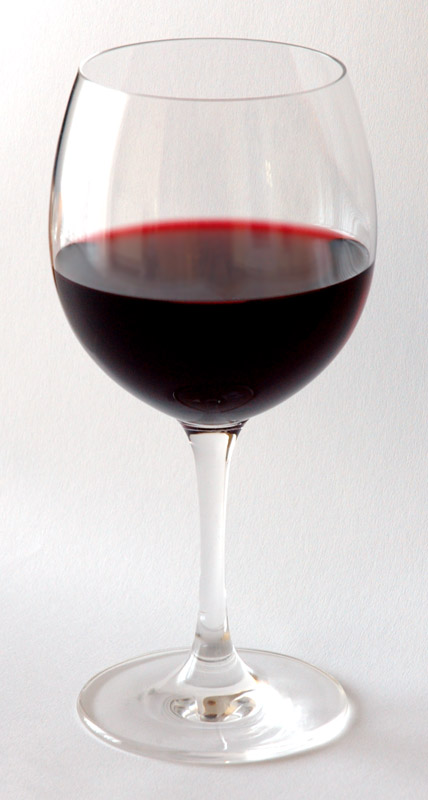
Oenophiles are devoted to wine.

Oenophilia (/ˌiːnəˈfɪliə/ EE-nə-FIL-ee-ə; from Greek for 'love of wine', see oinos and -philia), in the strictest sense, describes a disciplined devotion to wine, accompanying strict traditions of consumption and appreciation. In a general sense however, oenophilia simply refers to the enjoyment of wine, often by laymen. Oenophiles are also known as wine aficionados or connoisseurs. They are people who appreciate or collect wine, particularly grape wines from certain regions, varietal types, or methods of manufacture. While most oenophiles are hobbyists, some may also be professionals like vintners, sommeliers, wine merchants, or one who tastes and grades wines for a living.

== Origin ==
According to the Oxford English Dictionary, the earliest occurrence of the word oenophile was in 1865 in Culture of the Vine and Wine Making, an English translation of a French book by Jules Guyot. The word oenophilia was initially primarily used in contexts of excessive drinking, and in its earliest occurrence in 1908, spelled oinophilia. It became common in the wine lexicon in 1977 when Shirley Copperman used it for her new bring-your-own-wine restaurant she and her husband dubbed "Oenophilia", located on the upper West Side of Manhattan.

A reviewer in a local paper, The Westsider, wrote about the debut: "If the name suggests a rare disease you wouldn't want to catch, a sign in the window informs you that you may already have it. 'Oenophilia', it says, 'is an affliction of the senses characterized by intense cravings for good food and service and vintage wines served in a tasteful, comfortable setting at reasonable prices.'" The reviewer from The Village Voice wrote in 1977: "Oenophilia. No, not a social disease. It's the sensual orientation towards the pleasures of fine food and wine, and the name of a spiffy new bistro for elegant gourmandizing....'"

== See also ==
- Oenology
