= Matteo La Grua =

Italian Roman Catholic priest and exorcist

The Reverend Matteo La Grua
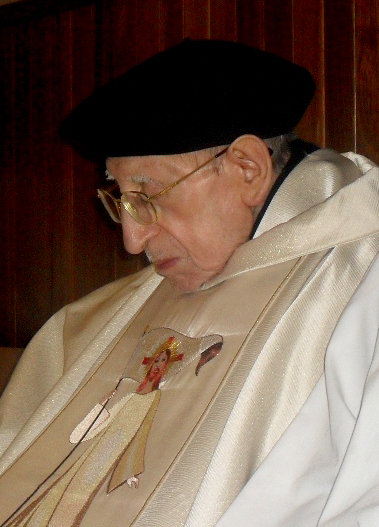
- Father Matteo La Grua
- Born: 15 February 1914; Castelbuono, Sicily, Italy
- Died: 15 January 2012 (aged 97); Palermo, Sicily, Italy
- Occupation: Exorcist
- Ordained: 1954 (priest)

Father Matteo La Grua (February 15, 1914 – January 15, 2012) was an Italian Roman Catholic priest and exorcist of the Franciscan Order. He was the author of several books in Italian, including La preghiera di liberazione.

He entered the priesthood on July 25, 1937. For over thirty years he was the official exorcist of the Archdiocese of Palermo, Italy. On Saturday, July 22, 2007, Father La Grua celebrated his 70th anniversary in the priesthood.

In a book printed in Italian called the President of the Exorcists written by the senior exorcist of Rome, Father Gabriele Amorth, there is a section by Father La Gura on curses and prayers of liberation.

== Libri di Padre Matteo La Grua ==
- M. G. La Grua (as pseudonym of Nebrodo), Castelbuono. Sua monografia con brevi cenni storici e Guida pratica, 1956.
- M. G. La Grua e C. Verso, Io verrò e lo curerò. Cristoterapia, Palermo, Herbita Editore, 2004.
- M. G. La Grua e C. Verso, Va' e anche tu fa lo stesso, Palermo, Herbita Editore, 2001
- M. G. La Grua, Caino. Dramma sacro in quattro atti, Palermo, Herbita Editore, 2004.
- M. G. La Grua, Cristoterapia (Riflessioni). Corso di Formazione alla Cristoterapia guidato da Padre Matteo La Grua, in co-operation with Associazione Terapisti Cattolici, Pro manuscripto ad uso interno dei gruppi RnS.
- M. G. La Grua, Frutti di Stagione. Poesie, Palermo, Sigma Edizioni, 2003.
- M. G. La Grua, G. Costanzo, G. Savagnone, Magia e Fede, Siracusa, Editrice Istina, 1996.
- M. G. La Grua, Il Cristo nelle pietre preziose, RnS, 1999.
- M. G. La Grua, La preghiera di consolazione, Palermo, Herbita Editore, 1997
- M. G. La Grua, La preghiera di guarigione, Palermo, Herbita Editore, 1987.
- M. G. La Grua, La preghiera di liberazione, Palermo, Herbita Editore, 1985.
- M. G. La Grua, La profezia assembleare nel Rinnovamento nello Spirito, Palermo, Centro Gesù Liberatore.
- M. G. La Grua, L'accompagnamento spirituale - Rilettura di Tobia, Palermo, Centro Gesù Liberatore.
- M. G. La Grua, Lavati sette volte nel Giordano e sarai guarito, RnS, 2000.
- M. G. La Grua, Le Litanie Lauretane, Palermo, Edizioni Amen, 2007.
- M. G. La Grua, M. A. Musolesi, Profeta di Dio, Shalom, 2010.
- M. G. La Grua, Mistagogie, Palermo, Sigma Edizioni, 2003.
- M. G. La Grua, Oltre le cose, Palermo, Amen Edizioni, 2007.
- M. G. La Grua, S. Martinez, Come colui che serve, RnS, 1999.
- M. G. La Grua, S. Martinez, M. Panciera, L'accoglienza. Come attualizzarla efficacemente nella vita comunitaria, Shalom, 1999.
- M. G. La Grua, Spunti per una riflessione vol. 1-2-3-4, Palermo,
- C. Verso, La tua fede ti ha salvato (presentazione di Padre Matteo La Grua), Palermo, Herbita Editrice, 1992.
