= Murder of Hilda Feste =

Criminal case in Norway

The murder of Hilda Feste was a criminal case in Norway, involving the rape and murder of a 98-year-old victim, Hilda Feste (20 February 1913 – 1 January 2012), perpetrated by then 19-year-old Christian Haugland (born 1993). In December 2012, Haugland was found guilty of the crime and sentenced to 19 years in prison, and he accepted the sentence. The case attracted media attention due to its brutality. The verdict described the crime as one of the most serious crimes ever committed in Norway by such a young man.
