= Nicolas Birtz =

Luxembourgish footballer

Personal information
- Date of birth: 17 March 1922
- Place of birth: Esch-sur-Alzette, Luxembourg
- Date of death: 20 March 2006 (aged 84)
- Place of death: Dudelange, Luxembourg
- Position: Midfielder

International career
Years	Team	Apps	(Gls)
1948	Luxembourg	1	(0)

Nicolas Birtz (17 March 1922 – 20 March 2006) was a Luxembourgish footballer. He played in one match for the Luxembourg national football team in 1948. Birtz was part of Luxembourg's squad for the football tournament at the 1948 Summer Olympics but he did not play in any matches.
