= Takashi Fujinama =

Japanese translator

Takashi Fujinuma (Japanese 藤沼貴) (1931 — January 9, 2012) was a Japanese translator of Russian and a Doctor of Philology.

== Biography ==
Takashi Fujinuma was born in Liaoning Province, China. He graduated from Tokyo Waseda University, Faculty of Philology. Fujinuma taught Russian literature until his retirement in 1997.

Fujinuma is known as a researcher and translator of the works of Leo Tolstoy (War and Peace, Anna Karenina, Resurrection). He was interested in all Russian classical and folk literature. Fujinuma created a biography of Tolstoy, which was published in several editions. For his research on Nikolay Karamzin, he was awarded the degree of Doctor of Philology. Fujinuma was a co-author and editor of several Russian-Japanese dictionaries, textbooks, and other similar works. For a long time, he was an active participant in bilateral cultural relations and repeatedly visited Russia.

On January 9, 2012, Fujinuma died of pneumonia at the age of 80.
