= C. W. Burpo =

American priest

Charles William (C. W.) Burpo (January 4, 1904 - March 1982) was a nationally known radio evangelist who was heard in the USA during the 1970s. His program was known as the "Bible Institute of the Air", the same name as his ministry. Dr. Burpo broadcast from his studio at The Bible Institute of the Air, Inc., of which he was the Director; it was located in Mesa, Arizona. He was on WXRI-FM, the flagship RADIO station of the Christian Broadcasting Network (CBN) back in the mid-70s. His program aired Monday - Friday @ 6:30 p.m.

== Views ==
"Doctor Burpo", as he was known, was a supporter of what is today classed as conservative, anti-communist politics mixed with fundamental religion. His broadcasting signature was the sound effect of a closing door announcing his intention to pray in his radio "Throne Room". His fame appears to have died with him.
