= Richard K. Olney =

American physician (1947–2012)

Richard Koch Olney (December 15, 1947 – January 27, 2012) was an American physician who was a pioneer in clinical research on amyotrophic lateral sclerosis (ALS). He was born in Munich, Germany. He was the founder and director of the ALS Treatment and Research Center at the University of California, San Francisco. In 2004 he was forced to retire after being diagnosed with ALS. He died of ALS at his home in Corte Madera, California in 2012. Olney grew up in Norman, Oklahoma. He earned bachelor's degrees in chemistry, mathematics and zoology from the University of Oklahoma where he graduated Phi Beta Kappa in 1968. He earned his M.D. from the Baylor College of Medicine in 1973 and then pursued further medical studies at the University of California, Los Angeles, and the University of Oregon Health Sciences Center.
