= Literature of Luxembourg =

The literature of Luxembourg is little known beyond the country's borders, partly because Luxembourg authors write in one or more of the three official languages (French, German and Luxembourgish), partly because many works are specifically directed to a local readership. Furthermore, it was not until the 19th century that the literature of Luxembourg began to develop in parallel with growing awareness of the country's national identity following the Treaty of Paris (1815) and the Treaty of London (1867).

== Yolanda of Vianden ==
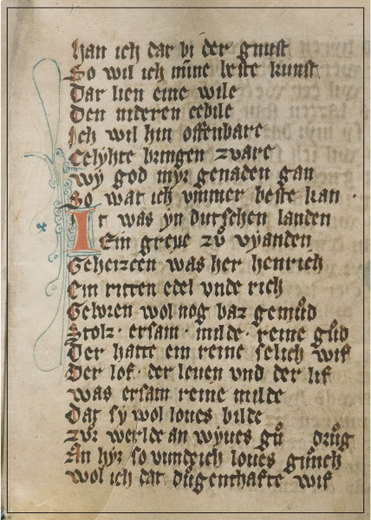
Codex Mariendalensis (c. 1310)

There is one historic work which has recently gained a place in Luxembourg literature. The Codex Mariendalensis, a manuscript from the beginning of the 14th century, tells the story of Yolanda of Vianden. Discovered in Ansembourg in November 1999, it is believed to be the work of Brother Hermann von Veldenz, who wrote the story of Yolanda's life after her death in 1283. It consists of 5,963 lines of rhyming couplets in the distinctive Moselle Franconian German dialect, which bears close similarities to today's Luxembourgish. The poem tells how Princess Yolanda gave up the comforts of her home in Vianden Castle to join the Convent of Marienthal where she later became the prioress.

== 19th century ==
Despite the use of French and German for administrative purposes, it was Lëtzebuerger Däitsch, now known as Luxembourgish, which was behind the development of Luxembourg's literature in the 19th century, contributing much to the consolidation of the national identity.

In 1829, Antoine Meyer published the very first book in Luxembourgish, a collection of poems titled E' Schrek op de' Lezeburger Parnassus (A Step up the Luxembourg Parnassus). The book contains six poems: a love poem, Uen d'Christine (Without Christine); a meditation on the romantic subject of night, D'Nuecht" (The Night); a real-life depiction, Een Abléck an engem Wiertshaus zu Lëtzebuerg (A Moment in a Luxembourg Inn); and three fables, D'porzelains an d'ierde Schierbel (The Shard of Porcelain and the Earthen Pot), D'Spéngel an d'Nol (The Pin and the Needle) and D'Flou an de Pierdskrécher (The Fly and the Horse Trough). Although Aesop and La Fontaine built their fables around animals, Meyer often personified inanimate objects. For example, in D'Spéngel an d'Nol, the well-to-do Miss Needle tries but fails to override the Pin, reflecting the failure of the French aristocracy to prevent the French Revolution. Meyer was to write several more books of Luxembourgish poetry while teaching mathematics at the University of Liège.

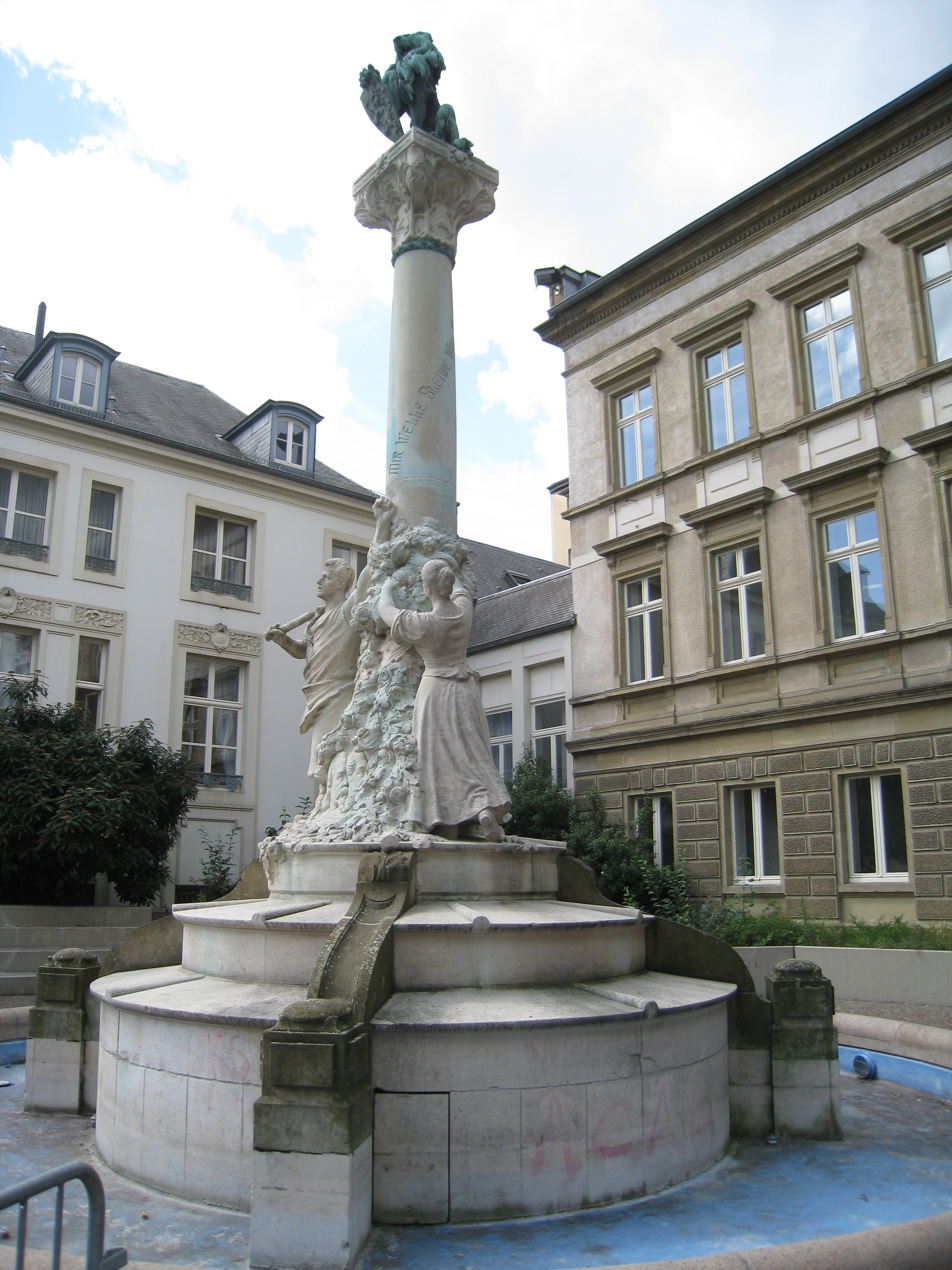
Monument to Dicks and Michel Lentz on the Place d'Armes, Luxembourg

The next generation brought three poets who are now considered to be Luxembourg's classical authors. Edmond de la Fontaine (1823–1891), better known by his pen-name Dicks, is remembered above all for his contributions to the theatre. His comedy De Scholtschäin (1855), the first play to be performed in Luxembourgish, was followed by D'Mumm Sèiss (1855), the operetta D'Kirmesgäscht (1856) and De Ramplassang (1863). He also wrote several poems and a number of prose works about Luxembourg and its people. His contemporary, Michel Lentz (1820–1893), another poet, is best known for having written Ons Heemecht, Luxembourg's national anthem, which contributed much to promoting the Luxembourgish language among its inhabitants. However, it was Michel Rodange (1827–1876) who wrote Luxembourg's national epic, Renert odder de Fuuss am Frack an a Maansgréisst or simply Rénert the Fox. Published in 1872, the satirical work is an adaptation of the traditional Low German fox epic to a setting in Luxembourg with pertinent insights into the characteristics of the local people.

While little of note was written in German during this period, Félix Thyes (1830–1855) wrote the first Luxembourg novel in French, Marc Bruno, profil d'artiste, which was published shortly after his early death in 1855.

== Early 20th century ==
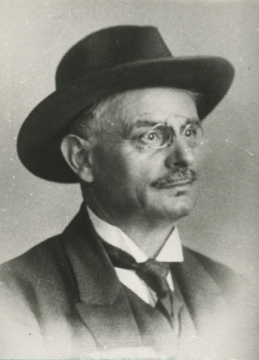
Nikolaus Welter (1871-1951)

Batty Weber (1860–1940) worked both as a journalist and as an author of short stories, novels, plays and poems, contributing much to the development of Luxembourg culture. One of his most important contributions to Luxembourg's identity was his Abreisskalender or Tear-Off Calendar, a daily column he contributed from 1913 to 1940 to the "Luxembuger Zeitung", commenting on items of local cultural interest.

An important literary figure in the early 20th century was Nikolaus Welter (1871–1951), who addressed Luxembourg issues in his German-language plays including Die Söhne des Öslings (1904) and as a poet in Hochofen (1913). Welter is also regarded as Luxembourg's first literary historian.

== Contemporary literature ==
After a rather quiet period following the Second World War, Anise Koltz (born 1928) began her literary career in the 1950s, initially writing fairy tales in German and Luxembourgish. However, in the 1970s, after the death of her husband who had been tortured by the Nazis, she turned exclusively to writing poetry in French. Her books have been widely published and translated into several languages. In 1998, she was awarded the Prix Guillaume Apollinaire for Le mur du son. Koltz has done much to create interest in Luxembourg writers through her annual Journées littéraires de Mondorf (Mondorf Literary Days) which she launched in 1963. She is now widely considered the country's most important contemporary author.

Jean Portante (born 1950) is a successful contemporary poet and novelist, not just in Luxembourg but in the wider French-speaking world. Brought up in an Italian immigrant family, he chose French as the language for his works. While primarily known as a poet, he has also written short stories, plays, screenplays and novels. He has also translated the works of Juan Gelman and Gonzalo Rojas into French. Jean Krier, writing poetry in German, was awarded both the German Chamisso Prize and the Luxembourg Servais Prize in 2011 for his Herzens Lust Spiele.

== Novels in Luxembourgish ==
Luxembourgish literature was long confined to poetry and the theatre, but in the 1980s, as a result of the movement to make Luxembourgish an official language, Guy Rewenig (born 1947) and Roger Manderscheid (1933–2010) both wrote novels in Luxembourgish. Rewenig's Hannert dem Atlantik (1985) broke new ground as the first novel written in the local language. The story of Jemp Medinger, a street sweeper, it is a critical account of the problems of family life and the authoritarian structures of politics and society, adapting the "stream of consciousness" technique to experiment with the Luxembourgish lexicon.

Manderscheid's childhood trilogy Schacko klak, De papagei um kâschtebam and Feier a flam, published in 1988, surprisingly sold 3,000 copies. "Schacko klak" is in fact a kind of autobiography told by an outsider. The title is a play on words reminding the reader of both a top hat (from French) and a military helmet (from German) but it is simply a nickname for the author alluding to his rounded bald head. Manderscheid's book reveals the author's consciousness of language use in Luxembourg, describing comical incidents with German soldiers in the war as well as the rather artificial use of French (based essentially on the language taught in the classroom). His use of Luxembourgish allows him to achieve this most effectively.

These initiatives led to a wider interest in writing novels in Luxembourgish. Among those published since 1990 are Frascht by Nico Helminger, Angscht virum Groussen Tunn, by Jean-Michel Treinen, Perl oder Pica by Jhemp Hoscheit, Iwwer Waasser by Georges Hausemer, and a number of novels by Josy Braun including Porto fir d'Affekoten and Kréiwénkel.

== Literature prizes ==
Luxembourg has two major literature prizes: the Servais Prize which has been awarded annually since 1992 to a Luxembourg author for a specific work; and the Batty Weber Prize, considered to be the national literary prize, which has been awarded once every three years since 1987 to a Luxembourg author for his entire literary work.
