= Tony Bourg =

Luxembourgish professor, author, linguist, literary scholar, and critic (1912–1991)

Tony Bourg (born 13 February 1912 in Weicherdange, and died 18 June 1991 in Luxembourg City; French pronunciation: [buʁ]) was a Luxembourgish professor, author, linguist, and literary scholar and critic.

== Biography ==
Tony Bourg attended primary school in Weicherdange, then went to the boarding school in Diekirch, as his father moved to the United States for a long time. After finishing secondary school in 1932, he studied Romance languages and literature, and classical studies, at the Cours Supérieurs in Luxembourg City and at the universities of Paris and Grenoble. From 1939 onwards he taught French and Latin at the Lycée classique d'Echternach. During World War II, from 1941 to 1945, he was forcibly resettled along with his wife. After the war, he became a professor at the Lycée de garçons Luxembourg. From 1955 to 1968 he taught French literature for jurists at the Cours Supérieurs, and from 1968 to 1975 at the French department of the Centre universitaire.

In 1971, he undertook the first large-scale renovation of the Victor-Hugo-Literaturmusée in Vianden. The occasion for this was the 100th anniversary of the French poet's last stay in Vianden in 1871. The museum was to illustrate Hugo's life from now on through a greater use of original documents.

From 1973, Tony Bourg lived in Weicherdange. In 1979 he was a founding member of the regional association De Cliärrwer Kanton – Veräin fir d'kulturellt Liäwwen a.s.b.l.

== Work ==
Tony Bourg published articles in many journals and newspapers, especially about foreign writers, such as Victor Hugo, or André Gide, and many others, who had resided in Luxembourg. He was one of the best authorities on the activities of the "Colpach circle", the group of artists, writers and intellectuals around Émile Mayrisch.

In the 1960s, Tony Bourg held literary talks on RTL Radio Lëtzebuerg. His essays and literary contributions were published posthumously under the title Recherches et Conférences littéraires.

Tony Bourg's archives are held in the National Literature Centre under the number CNL L-0011.

== Named after him ==
- A literary prize, the Prix Tony-Bourg;
- A library in Troisvierges
- The room of Victor Hugo on the 1st floor of the Victor Hugo Literature Museum, the Tony-Bourg-Sall;
- A room on the 2nd floor of the National Literature Centre

== Publications ==
- Bourg, Tony, 1959. "La réforme de l'enseignement français". Journal des professeurs n° 44: 39–48.
- Bourg, Tony, 1965. "Victor Hugo au Luxembourg en 1862". Les Cahiers luxembourgeois: revue libre des lettres, des sciences et des arts, 33, n° 2: 81–97. Luxembourg.
- Bourg, Tony, 1978. "Le Luxembourg dans le roman français". In: Les relations franco-luxembourgeoises de Louis XIV à Robert Schuman / Actes du colloque de Luxembourg, 17–19 novembre 1977. Metz. pp. 301–314.
- Bourg, Tony, 1982. "Victor Hugo et la ruine de Bourscheid". Les cahiers de Bourscheid n° 1: 107–119.
- Bourg, Tony, 1994. Recherches et conférences littéraires: recueil de textes. [éd.: Jean-Claude Frisch, Cornel Meder, Jean-Claude Muller et Frank Wilhelm]. Ministère des affaires culturelles, Luxembourg, Imprimerie Saint-Paul. 797 p. Publications nationales du Ministère des affaires culturelles.
- Bourg, Tony & Frank Wilhelm, 1985. Le Grand-Duché de Luxembourg dans les carnets de Victor Hugo. 343 p. RT Édition, Impr. centrale, Luxembourg. [avant-propos de Jacques Rigaud; préf. de René Journet]
- Bourg, Tony & Gilbert Trausch, 1988. Le Luxembourg, terre de contrastes. Banque de Luxembourg, Luxembourg. 20 p.
- Bourg, Tony & Joseph-Emile Muller (dir.), 1980. Les Mayrisch, l'apport et le rayonnement européen d'une famille luxembourgeoise: Exposition du 28 novembre 1980 au 4 janvier 1981. Musée d'histoire et d'art, Luxembourg, Impr. Centrale. 48 p.

== Literatur ==
- Ensch, Jean, 1987. "Le nom de famille luxembourgeois Bourg, avec une généalogie ascendante du professeur Tony Bourg". In: Muller, Jean-Claude & Frank Wilhelm, 1987. Le Luxembourg et l'étranger: présences et contacts = Luxemburg und das Ausland : Begegnungen und Beziehungen: pour les 75 ans du professeur Tony Bourg. Luxembourg: SESAM. pp. 247–260.
- Goetzinger, Germaine & Claude D. Conter, zusammen mit Gast Mannes, Pierre Marson, Roger Muller, Nicole Sahl, Sandra Schmit und Frank Wilhelm, 2007. Luxemburger Autorenlexikon. 687 p. Publications nationales du Ministère de la culture. Centre national de littérature, Mersch. ISBN 978-2-919903-06-1.
- Koch-Kent, Henri, Vic Abens, Marcel Engel, Paul Spang, Lex Jacoby, Rosemarie Kieffer, Lucien Kayser, Frank Wilhelm, Jul Christophory & Cornel Meder, 1991. "Hommages à Tony Bourg". Galerie: revue culturelle et pédagogique, Vol. 9, Nr. 2: 168–189. Differdange.
- Schaffner, Hugues, 1991. "Bibliographie du professeur Tony Bourg". De Cliärrwer Kanton, Joer 13, Nr. 3: 26–28. Clervaux.
- Wilhelm, Frank, 1991. "À la mémoire de Tony Bourg (1912–1991): collaborateur et fidèle ami de 'Ré-Création'". Ré-création: magazine culturel de l'APESS, Bd. 7: 133–141. Diekirch.
- Wilhelm, Frank, 1991. "À la mémoire de Tony Bourg (1912–1991), professeur, historien et critique littéraire, collaborateur des 'Cahiers luxembourgeois', homme droit". Cahiers lux., n° 3: 5–8.
- Wilhelm, Frank, 1991. "Nediirt, Här Wilhelm. Erënnerungen un den Tony Bourg". Galerie n° 2: 182–186.
- Wilhelm, Frank, 1991. "Si Echternach m'était conté ... (20). Le professeur Tony Bourg (1912–1991) à/et Echternach". Lux. Wort. Warte, 4 July 1991.
- Wilhelm, Frank, 1991. "Tony Bourg. Ses contributions au 'Letzeburger Land'". D'Letzeburger Land, 25 July 1991. Ill.
- Wilhelm, Frank, 2000. "Il y a dix ans, Tony Bourg nous quittait". Galerie: revue culturelle et pédagogique, Vol. 18, Nr. 4: 535–542. Differdange.
