= Batty Weber Prize =

Luxembourgian literary award

The Batty Weber Prize or Prix Batty Weber is Luxembourg's national literary prize. It has been awarded every three years since 1987 to a Luxembourg writer for his entire literary work. It is named after the writer Batty Weber (1860–1940) who considerably influenced Luxembourg's cultural life.

== Laureates ==
- 1987: Edmond Dune
- 1990: Roger Manderscheid
- 1993: Léopold Hoffmann
- 1996: Anise Koltz
- 1999: Nic Weber
- 2002: Pol Greisch
- 2005: Guy Rewenig
- 2008: Nico Helminger
- 2011: Jean Portante
- 2014: Lambert Schlechter
- 2017: Georges Hausemer
- 2020: Pierre Joris
- 2023: Margaret Steckel
- 2026: Guy Helminger

== See also ==
- Literature of Luxembourg
