= CNL =

CNL can refer to:

- Allensworth State Park station, California, United States, special-arrangement Amtrak station with code CNL
- Cannon Lake, a microprocessor from Intel
- Centre national du livre, French Government agency
- CNL Financial Group, previously Commercial Net Lease
- The National Literature Centre (French: Centre national de littérature), the national literary archive of Luxembourg
- The Commissioners of Northern Lighthouses, now known as the Northern Lighthouse Board
- Compute Node Linux, a Linux-based operating system used with Cray supercomputers
- Clinical nurse leader
- Columbia, Newberry and Laurens Railroad
- Controlled natural languages
- Computer Networks Laboratory
- CityNightLine, a former night train network in Germany and neighboring countries
- Sindal Airport, Denmark (IATA code CNL)
- Canley railway station, West Midlands, three letter station code
- Chronic neutrophilic leukemia
- Canadian Nuclear Laboratories, formerly the Chalk River Laboratories
- CONCACAF Nations League, an international association football competition involving the men's national teams of CONCACAF's member associations
