= Rewenig =

Rewenig is a surname. Notable people with the surname include:

- Guy Rewenig (born 1947), Luxembourgian author and novelist.
- Marcel Rewenig (1921–2004), Luxembourgian footballer.
