= Portante =

Portante is a surname. Notable people with the surname include:

- Jean Portante (born 1950), Luxembourgian writer
- Peter Portante (born 1996), American racing driver
