= Neue Sirene =

The German literary magazine Neue Sirene existed between 1994 and 2017. The title was founded in 1994 and was issued twice a year. Its headquarters was in Munich. The magazine published German and international literature, while the latter was always accompanied by its German translation. Thus, the magazine intended to present the "stylistic and thematic richness of contemporary literature". Additionally, each number also contained artistic photographs. Bettina Hohoff is the founder, publisher and the editor in chief.

From number 21 (2007) the Neue Sirene was edited as book series under the title Crucial Contemporary Literature. The concept of mixing German and international literary texts was kept. Following the editors, three groups of authors were presented equally:

- authors of German native language, writing in German,
- authors of a different native language, writing in German, and
- authors of a different native language, whose texts are printed in the original language, together with a German translation.

Neue Sirene exclusively published first editions, which was also true for already well established writers, such as Jean Cocteau, Emily Dickinson, Imre Kertész, Eugenio Montale, Sylvia Plath and Rainer Maria Rilke. Each issue contains an editorial as introduction. Published authors are e.g. Adunis, Michael Basse, Klaus Ebner, Michael Eisele, İsmet Elçi, Simone Frieling, Helga Gruschka, Claudia Höpfner, Dietrich Krusche, Gellu Naum, Lutz Rathenow, Wolfgang Sréter, Renata Zambrzycka, Liao Yiwu and Bülent Kaçan.

The last issue of Neue Sirene was #30 published in 2017.
