= Gilbert Trausch =

Luxembourgish historian

Gilbert Trausch (20 September 1931 – 3 June 2018) was a Luxembourgish historian. He and other colleagues of the post-World War II generation of Luxembourg historians, such as Paul Margue, brought a new concern for Luxembourg's international relations to their study of its history.

== Biography ==
Trausch came from a Catholic middle-class family background. His father was an engineer in the steel firm Hadir. Gilbert Trausch attended the Lycée de garçons Luxembourg, where he was influenced by Tony Bourg, and finished school in 1950. Following this, he studied history at the Sorbonne and at Exeter.

In 1956, he then taught French and History at the Lycée de garçons, the same secondary school as Margue, and later received the title of professeur in 1959. In 1963, he became a Membre correspondant and in 1964 a Membre effectif of the Historical Section of the Grand Ducal Institute.

From 1968 to 1995 he was a professor at the Centre universitaire du Luxembourg, and was its director from 1984 to 1990. From 1972 to 1984 he was also the director of the National Library.

He was also a professor at the University of Liège. In 1982 he became the Luxembourgish representative at the European Commission's Liaison group of professors of contemporary history. He also taught at the College of Europe in Bruges. His speciality was modern and contemporary history of Luxembourg, and the functioning of the state, politics and society of Luxembourg.

Gilbert Trausch played a prominent role in the celebrations of the 150th anniversary of Luxembourgish independence in 1989, as the head of the commission organising the celebrations. At the official celebration on 18 April 1989, he was the only one to speak alongside Jacques Santer and Javier Pérez de Cuéllar.

In 1990 he became the director of the Centre de Recherches européennes Robert Schuman.

In 2005 Trausch campaigned for a Yes vote in the Luxembourgish referendum on the European Constitution.

Later, he was associated with the Centre Universitaire du Luxembourg and the National Library of Luxembourg, and was a professor at the College of Europe.

== Partial publication list ==
=== Monographs ===
- Trausch, Gilbert. Le Luxembourg à l'époque contemporaine, du partage de 1839 à nos jours. Luxembourg: Editions Bourg-Bourger, 1975.
- Trausch, Gilbert. Le Luxembourg sous l'Ancien Régime. Luxembourg: Bourg-Bourger, 1977.
- Trausch, Gilbert. Joseph Bech, un homme dans son siècle: cinquante années d'histoire luxembourgeoise (1914-1964). Luxembourg, 1978.
- Trausch, Gilbert. Histoire du Luxembourg. Paris: Hatier, 1992.
- Trausch, Gilbert. Histoire du Luxembourg: le destin européen d'un petit pays. Toulouse: Privat, 2003.

=== Articles ===
- Trausch, Gilbert. "Du nouveau sur le ‘Kleppelkrich’: Les soulèvements paysans de 1798 dans la région de Neufchâteau et leurs répercussions dans le Département des Forêts." In: Publications de la Section historique de l'Institut grand-ducal de Luxembourg, 63-135. LXXIX. Luxembourg, 1962.
- Trausch, Gilbert. 1974. "Contributions à l'histoire sociale de la question du Luxembourg. 1914-1922." Hémecht (1): 5-118.

=== Contributions to edited works ===
- Trausch, Gilbert. "La place de la Section historique de l'Institut grand-ducal dans la formation du Luxembourg." In: Publications de la Section Historique de l'Institut Grand-Ducal de Luxembourg (CXII).
- Trausch, Gilbert. "La stratégie du faible: le Luxembourg pendant la Première Guerre mondiale (1914-1919)." In: Le rôle de la place des petits pays en Europe au XXe siècle, Baden-Baden, 2005.

=== As editor ===
- Tamse, Coenraad, and Gilbert Trausch, eds. Die Beziehungen zwischen den Niederlanden und Luxemburg im 19. und 20. Jahrhundert. Zoetermeer, 1991.
- Trausch, Gilbert, ed. La Ville de Luxembourg. Du château des comtes à la métropole européenne. Anvers: Fonds Mercator, 1994.
- Trausch, Gilbert, ed. CSV Spiegelbild eines Landes und seiner Politik? Geschichte der Christlich-Sozialen Volkspartei Luxemburgs im 20. Jahrhundert. Luxembourg: Imprimerie Saint-Paul, 2008.
