= Michael Basse =

German writer

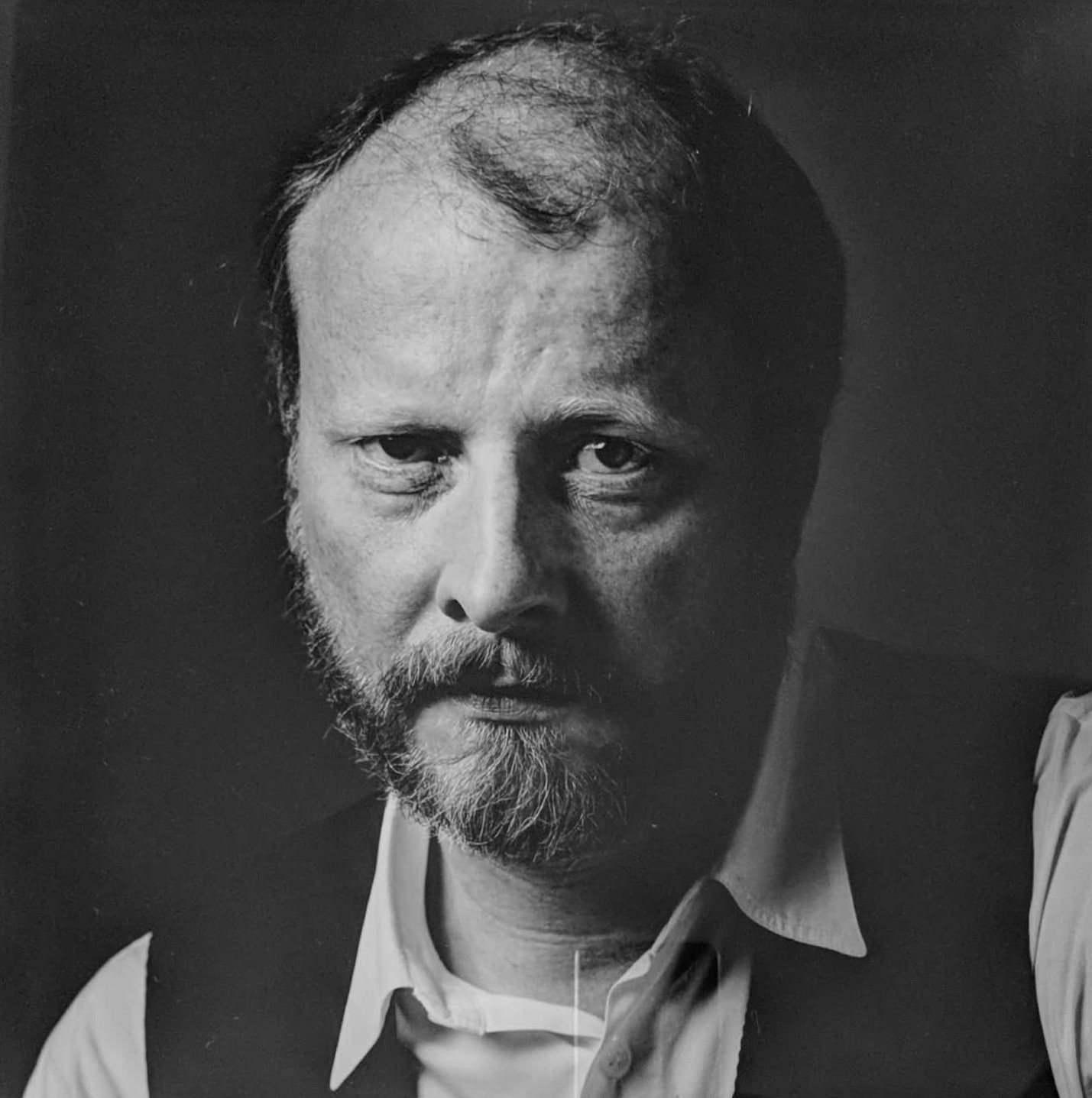

Michael Basse (April 14, 1957, Bad Salzuflen) is a German writer. He has published novels, poems, essays and audiobooks, as well as poetry translated from English, French and Bulgarian (including John F. Deane, Blaga Dimitrova and Lyubomir Nikolov).

== Early life ==
Basse grew up in North Rhine-Westphalia, Lower Saxony and Baden-Württemberg. He earned his university-entrance diploma in 1976 at the Evangelical Seminaries of Maulbronn and Blaubeuren. Between 1977 and 1979, Basse worked as a trainee in the editorial department of Schwäbische Zeitung. Thereafter, he worked at Süddeutscher Rundfunk (SDR) in Stuttgart. In 1984, he moved to Munich and began studying philosophy at LMU Munich, where he graduated in 1990 with a master's degree. In 1984, Basse was one of the co-founders of the Munich Office of Literature and was part of the board of directors for four years.

In the 1990s and 2000, Basse introduced numerous authors in the Poetry Cabinet Munich, among them Anise Koltz and Jean Portante, Eva Hesse and Mary de Rachewiltz, daughter and editor of the works of Ezra Pound. From 1993 to 2015, Basse worked as a freelancer in the Cultural Critics Department of Bayerischer Rundfunk. From 1994 to 1999, he contributed reviews to the literary supplement of Sueddeutsche Zeitung on a regular basis. Since 2015 he has focused on his work as a novelist.

== Literary work ==
Basse’s first collection of poems, And in the morning there is still news (1992, 1994 2nd ed.) was well received, and he was characterized as "a powerful lyric poet who looks at the particles of reality under the magnifying glass". Basse's early lyrics were strongly influenced by his former mentor, Johannes Poethen; In spite of this, it was observed that "he does not abandon rhythm and verse, but always remains in the realm of everyday life, facts".

The second volume of poetry by Basse was described as "a kind of poetic cartography". In The Conquest Does Not Take Place (1997) he uses the form of poems in prose for the first time. Painting, dance and music are also repeatedly included in the poems. The reader of Basse’s Sea in Mind feels like the viewer of Caspar David Friedrich’s The Monk by the Sea: “As if his eyelids were ripped out.” In secondary literature, Basse’s second volume was also praised for its formal stylistic stringency: “Poems in prose without periods or commas.”

His third collection of poems, Partisan Feelings (2004) was composed in a form Basse called lyrical protocols: Texts or speech acts completely synthesized that combine different levels of discourse and reality. After another volume of poems in prose (Splendid People, 2008), Basse returned in his fifth – and for now last – book of poems, Skype Connected (2010), to shorter poetic forms. Like in his lyrical protocols, he sticks closely to the everyday spoken language. At the heart of this collection of love poems is, according to the internet portal Fixpoetry, "the mature love of two people (...) who, from time to time, question everything one could possibly question. "His love poems generate their intimacy - and emotional, as well as media-historic timeliness - out of the spiritual abyss of human alienness and territorial distance; healing moments come from Italy, which Basse - as a brother in spirit of Pasolini - envisions in a radical anti-idyllic way."

In 2010, Basse published his first novel, Career, in which he takes a critical look at the German left during the 80s and 90s.

In 2016, he self-published his second novel, American Zone, which uses the example of an officer's family in the Swabian province to address the problematic German-American relationship. After reading it, the author Sten Nadolny came to the following conclusion: "The book (...) challenges its readers - it always does - but it rewards them with a reliable survey of the era of that North American hegemony that seems to be losing its power today. Is that a good thing or a bad thing? Michael Basse doesn't get lost in ex cathedra assessments, he simply provides an accurate moral picture in which we recognize ourselves."

A complete new version of the novel under the title Yank Zone was published in 2022 by Edition Klöpfer at Kröner in Stuttgart. For the Nürnberger Nachrichten, Yank Zone is an "impressive portrait of a West German era that was strongly influenced by the American way of life." The Stuttgarter Zeitung noted: "Basse attempts to illuminate his subject from many narrative perspectives and over many years; this requires a very concentrated reading. In return, he delivers a novel that combines the personal with cultural history in an exemplary manner." The SWR 2 Lesezeichen series states: "American way of life and Swabian attitude to life - Michael Basse gets to the heart of these contrasts in a narrative and linguistic manner. He naturally continues some of the dialog in English and finds an unmistakable sound for each voice in his story (...) With Yank Zone, Michael Basse has brought an exciting chapter to mind - sharply observed and cleverly composed. An unsparing stocktaking."

The Internet portal Literaturkritik.de concludes: "History and historical data are combined here with personal experiences that make the time very empathetic and make the book a valuable contribution to the period of the American occupation."

Michael Basse's poems have been translated into several languages, including English, Hungarian and Dutch.
