= Lambert Schlechter =

Luxembourgish author (born 1941)

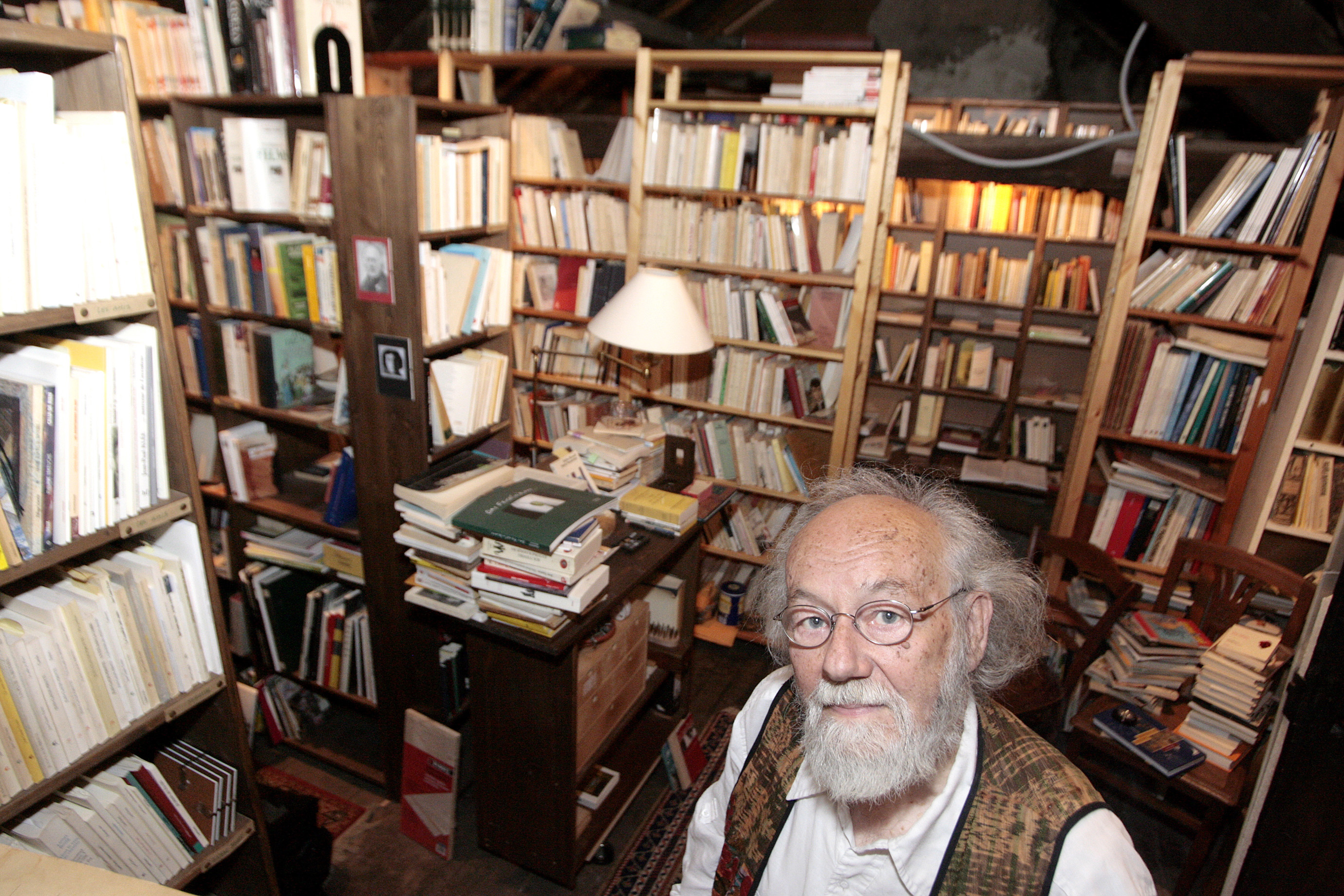
Lambert Schlechter, April 2009

Lambert Schlechter (born 4 December 1941) is a Luxembourgish author who has published some 40 books written in French, most of them published in France and two written in German published in Luxembourg. His work includes poetry, novels, short stories and essays. A great number of contributions to newspapers, magazines and anthologies in different countries. Since 2006 he is working on a greater prose project under the general title "Le Murmure du monde": a collection of literary, philosophical and autobiographical fragments; so far nine volumes have been published, X, XI and XII are in preparation.

== Biography ==
Born on 4 December 1941 in Luxembourg City, Schlechter studied philosophy and literature in Paris and Nancy before teaching philosophy, French language and literature at the Lycée Classique in Echternach. His first works, Das große Rasenstück (1981), a collection of poems, and Buntspecht im Hirn (1982), in prose, were followed by articles, short stories (Partances, 2003) and novels (Le silence inutile, 1991) in French. He was vice-president of the Luxembourg section of Amnesty International, Luxembourg, representative in the International Service for Human Rights in Geneva, member of the Société des écrivains luxembourgeois de langue française (SELF), president of the Conseil national du livre.

He has been invited to more than hundred Literature & Poetry Festivals all over the world. Some of his books were translated in Armenia, Bulgaria, Italy, Spain, Mexico and Bosnia.

In April 2015, Schlechter's house in Eschweiler was destroyed by a large fire, in which 30,000 books and documents as well as nearly all his manuscripts were lost. Culture minister Maggy Nagel reacted to the event, lamenting "the loss of the extensive literary collection of manuscripts and books housed in this remarkable building, which forms part of Luxembourg’s rural heritage", and Grand Duke Henri personally visited Schlechter at his destroyed home.

== Works ==
- Das grosse Rasenstück, poems, Éditions Guy Binsfeld, Luxembourg, 1981
- La muse démuselée, poems, Éditions phi, Echternach, (Luxembourg), 1982 ISBN 978-3-88865-010-9
- Buntspecht im Hirn, prose, collection MOL, Differdange (Luxembourg), 1982
- Angle mort, le livret de la cambuse, Éditions phi, Echternach (Luxembourg), 1988 ISBN 2-914387-68-7
- Pieds de mouche, Éditions phi, Echternach (Luxembourg), 1990 ISBN 2-87962-008-2
- Le silence inutile, novel, Éditions phi, Echternach (Luxembourg), 1991 ISBN 2-7103-0710-3
- Ruine de parole, novel, Éditions phi, Luxembourg, 1993 ISBN 2-87962-022-8
- Honda rouge et cent pigeons, poem, Éditions phi, 1994 ISBN 2-87962-042-2
- Partances, short stories, Éditions L'Escampette, Bordeaux, 2003 ISBN 2-914387-23-7
- Smoky, Éditions Le Temps qu'il fait, Cognac, 2003 ISBN 2-86853-387-6
- Le papillon de Solutré, Éditions phi, Luxembourg, 2003 ISBN 2-87962-178-X
- Le monde immodérément, with Valérie Rouzeau, Éditions nuit myrtide, Lille, 2004 ISBN 2-913192-32-7
- Le murmure du monde, Éditions Le Castor Astral, 2006, (Prix Servais 2007) ISBN 2-85920-653-1
- Ici c'est comme nulle part, Éditions bibliophiles Transignum, Paris, 2007
- Petits travaux dans la maison, Éditions phi, Luxembourg, 2008 ISBN 978-2-87962-254-5
- Pourquoi le merle de Breughel n'est peut-être qu'un corbeau, Éditions Estuaires, Luxembourg, 2008 ISBN 978-2-9599704-4-3
- La robe de nudité, Éditions des Vanneaux, Collection Amorosa, 2008 ISBN 978-2-916071-39-8
- L'envers de tous les endroits, Éditions phi, Collection graphiti, 2010 ISBN 978-2-87962-281-1
- La trame des jours, (Le murmure du monde 2), Éditions des Vanneaux, 2010 ISBN 978-2-916071-61-9
- Les repentirs de Froberger (dessins Nicolas Maldague), Éditions La part des anges, 2011 ISBN 978-2-84418-233-3
- La pivoine de Cervantès, Éditions La part commune, 2011 ISBN 978-2-84418-233-3
- Lettres à Chen Fou, Éditions L'Escampette, 2011 ISBN 978-2-35608-034-9
- Piéton sur la voie lactée, petites parleries au fil des jours, neuvains', Éditions phi, coll. graphiti, 2012, ISBN 978-2-87964-195-9
- Enculer la camarde, petites parleries au fil des jours 2, 99 neuvains, illustré par 12 photoworks de Lysiane Schlechter, poemsn Éditions phi, coll. graphiti, 2013, ISBN 978-2-87964-199-7
- Le Fracas des nuages, (Le murmure du monde 3), prose fragments, Éditions Le Castor Astral, 2013, ISBN 978-2-85920-899-8
- Je est un pronom sans conséquence, petites parleries au fil des jours 3, 99 neuvains, poems, Éditions phi, coll. graphiti, 2014, ISBN 978-99959-37-00-3
- Nichts kapiert, doch alles notiert, Lyrik & Prosa 1968–2014, éditions Guy Binsfeld, 2014, ISBN 978-2-87954-287-4
- Con de fée, poèmes, avec neuf sérigraphies de Robert Brandy, Redfoxpress, Irlande, 2015
- La Théorie de l'univers, distiques décasyllabiques, éditions phi, coll. graphiti, 2015, ISBN 978-99959-37-10-2
- Inévitables bifurcations, (Le murmure du monde 4), fragments, éditions Les Doigts dans la prose, 2016, ISBN 978-2-9536083-9-7
- Milliards de manières de mourir, 99 neuvains, IVe série, éditions phi, coll. graphiti, 2016, (ISBN 978-99959-37-28-7)
- Le Ressac du temps, (Le murmure du monde 5), éditions Les Vanneaux, 2016, (ISBN 978-2-37129-100-3)
- Monsieur Pinget saisit le râteau et traverse le potager, (Le murmure du monde / 6), éditions phi, 2017, (ISBN 978-99959-37-43-0)

Une mite sous la semelle du Titien, proseries, (Le Murmure du monde / 7), éditions Tinbad, 2018, (ISBN 979-10-96415-12-0) (recensions41,42 /43,44,45)

Agonie Patagonie, 99 neuvains, Ve série, éditions phi, coll. graphiti, 2018, (ISBN 978-99959-37-58-4) (recension46)

Les Parasols de Jaurès, proseries, (Le Murmure du monde / 8), avec toutes les pages du carnet manuscrit en fac-similé, éditions Guy Binsfeld, 2018, (ISBN 978-99959-42-47-2)

Je n'irai plus jamais à Feodossia, 198 proseries, (Le Murmure du monde / 9, éditions Tinbad, 2019, (ISBN 979-10-96415-26-7)

Mais le merle n'a aucun message, 99 neuvains, VIe série, avec 50 dessins de Lysiane Schlechter, éditions phi, 2020, (ISBN 978-2-919791-43-9)

Wendelin et les autres, 16 nouvelles illustrées par Lysiane Schlechter, éditions L'Herbe qui tremble, 2022, (ISBN 978-2491462321)

Danubiennement, 24 proseries, Le Murmure du monde / 10, éditions l'Arbre à paroles, 2022, (ISBN 9782874067266) Le Murmure du monde, vol. 10

40 ans d'écriture, anthologie personnelle, 650 pages, éditions phi, 2022, (ISBN 978-2-919791-89-7)

Perles de pacotille sur le chapelet du silence, neuvains, éditions Apic, collection Poèmes du Monde, preface Jean Portante, Alger, 2023, (ISBN 9789931468974)

Fragments du journal intime de Dieu, with illustrations by Patricia Lippert and Pascale Behrens, éditions L'Herbe qui tremble, 2023

== Prizes and distinctions ==
- 1981 Prix du Concours littéraire national for De bello gallico
- 1986 Prix du Concours littéraire national for Angle mort
- 2007 Mention spéciale du jury lors du Grand prix Léopold Sédar Senghor (lauréat Guy Goffette)
- 2007 Prix Servais for Le murmure du monde
- 2010 Prix Birago Diop, Salon international des Poètes francophones, Bénin
- 2013 Premio alla Carriera, Festival Internazionale di Poesia Civile, Vercelli (Italia)
- 2014 Batty Weber Prize, for the entire work
- 2015 Premio internazionale NordSud, Fondazione Pescarabruzzo, Pescara, Italie

Since 2001 Chevalier des Arts et des Lettres, France.

== Nominations ==
- 1994 finalist for Prix international de francophonie Yvan-Goll (laureate: Werner Lambersy)
- 2005 nominated for Prix des Découvreurs (laureates: Ludovic Degroote et Olivier Barbarant)
- 2006 nominated for Lo Stellato – Premio Internazionale di Narrativa, Salerno – contribution in the anthology of the twelve nominated authors "Le parole dei luoghi", edizioni Marlin, Salerno, 2006

== Books in translation ==
English:

- One Day I will Write a Poem, selected poems, Black Fountain Press, Luxembourg, 2018, ISBN 978-99959-998-1-0

Armenian :

- Le papillon de Solutré, translation Alexandre Toptchyan, éditions Lusabats, Erevan, 2008
- Petits travaux dans la maison, translation Alexandre Toptchyan, éditions Lusabats, Erevan, 2010
- Honda rouge et cent pigeons, translation Alexandre Toptchyan, éditions Lusabats, Erevan, 2011

Italian :

- All'opposto di ogni posto (traduction de L’envers de tous les endroits), translation and preface by Clemente Condello, bilingue, edizioni interlinea, Novara, 2013, ISBN 978-88-8212-911-8 Prix en 2013: Premio alla Carriera, Festival Internazionale di Poesia Civile, Vercelli (Italia)

Bulgarian :

- Piéton sur la voie lactée. Poèmes choisis, translation Aksinia Mihailova, Foundation for Bulgarian Literature, Sofia, 2013, ISBN 978-954-677-082-0

Spanish and Bosnian in preparation

A certain number of single poems translated (in anthologies and magazines) into Russian, Slovenian, Croatian, Bosnian, Spanish, German, Rumanian

== Contributions in anthologies and magazines ==
- Réverbères et phalènes, poème, in: Lëtzebuerger Land, 1960, No1
- Selbst- & heterokritisches Prosa-Stück über das Drum & Dran des Unbehagens, Doppelpunkt, Nr 2, 1968, S. 17–21
- Le premier mot, prose, in: Nouvelles Pages de la Self (Société des écrivains luxembourgeois de langue française), No 7, 1978
- Celui qui / Ecrire, prose, in: Nouvelles Pages de la SELF, No 8, 1980
- L'écriture l'érection, prose, in Nouvelles Pages de la Self, No 9, 1981
- La septième mort, prose, in Nouvelles Pages de la SELF, No 10, 1982
- Der Fährmann / Die Töpferin, in "Schriftbilder, Neue Prosa aus Luxemburg", Éditions Guy Binsfeld, (Luxembourg), 1984
- Das Sternbild und die Wildsau, in "Nach Berlin", Autorenverlag, (Luxembourg), 1984
- Le monde anémone, prose, in: Almanach 1985, éditions Binsfeld, 1984
- Pattes d'oie et points d'orgue, proses, in: Nouvelles Pages de la SELF, No 11, 1984
- De bello gallico, nouvelle, in: revue Ré/Création, No 1, 1985
- Johann Sebastian und die Daumenschraube, in "In Sachen Papst, Texte zum Papstbesuch in Luxemburg 1985", Autorenverlag, (Luxembourg), 1985
- Gott mit uns – und ohne mich, in: Galerie, 1986, Nr 4
- Les treize notes définitives, proses, in: Nouvelles pages de la Self, No 12-13, 1986
- Le mâle entendu, Texticules, dans "Lustich, Texte zur Sexualität", Autorenverlag, (Luxembourg), 1987
- Kleine Gespräche mit Eugenio, in Poésie Internationale, Éditions Guy Binsfeld, (Luxembourg), 1987
- Chevrotements, prose, in: Almanach 1986, éditions Binsfeld, 1987
- Et soudain page blanche pour le remorque de Niort, prose, in: Estuaires, 1988, No5
- Les trois O d'Oblomov, prose, in: Cahiers luxembourgeois, 1989, No 1
- Kirchenleere oder Fisch auf heissem Sand, Essay, in: "Neue Gespräche", Heft 1/1989, Paderborn // "Forum" Nr 111, April 1989, Luxemburg
- Cahier du 6e mois, fragments, in: Cahiers luxembourgeois, 1989, No 5
- Le vrac du temps d'aphasie, fragments, in: Les Cahiers luxembourgeois, 1990, No2
- Abrégé du petit jour, dans L'année nouvelle, 71 nouvelles, Canevas éditeur / Les Éperonniers / L'instant même / Éditions phi, (Luxembourg), 1993
- Corps encore ou Rien à voir, essay on the nude photographs by Wolfgang Osterheld, Revue Estuaires, No 20, Luxembourg,1993
- Bréviaire du temps réel, in Europe, revue littéraire mensuelle, avril 1995
- Le champ de l'ignorable / Les délires sont dangereux / l'égratignure / les franges inoffensives, proses, dans : Regards d'écrivains, éditions Le Phare, 1995
- Les aquarelles du caporal, in Frontière belge, Éditions de l'Aube, 1996
- Rubrique des grabataires, prose, in: Le Paresseux, No 10, 1996
- Ticket pour ailleurs, dans Des trains passent la frontière, Éditions de L'Aube, 1997
- Jamais je n'ai eu soif autant, in Histoires d'eaux, Le Castor Astral, 1998
- Quand / Ecrire, dans Au fil du temps, Le Castor Astral, 1999
- Lapsus encore / Onze chances sur douze, dans Douze auteurs luxembourgeois, Éditions phi / Journées littéraires de Mondorf, 1999
- J’écris pour le jour, textes extraits de Ruine de parole et Honda rouge et cent pigeons, dans Poésie, Anthologie luxembourgeoise, (présentation by Jean Portante), Écrits des Forges (Québec) et Éditions phi (Luxembourg), 1999
- Offrande pour bongo & clavicorde, dans Cahiers francophones d’Europe Centre-orientale, La francophonie du Grand-Duché de Luxembourg par Frank Wilhelm, Université Janus Pannonius, Pécs, (Hongrie), 1999
- Ici c'est comme nulle part, dans Poète toi-même / 40 poètes, une anthologie de poésie contemporaine, Le Castor Astral, 2000
- vom weiss der worte / nachricht, (aus: Das grosse Rasenstück, 1981), in: "Deutschsprachige Lyrik in Luxemburg", Institut Grand-Ducal, Section des Arts et des Lettres, 2002
- Noircir de nuit la blanche feuille, in "Virum wäisse Blat", des auteurs luxembourgeois écrivent sur l’écriture, (textes en luxembourgeois, allemand et français), avec photos de Philippe Matsas (agence Opale), Éditions Guy Binsfeld,(Luxembourg), 2003
- Le paysage à travers la littérature, anthologie, auteurs des 46 pays du Conseil de l’Europe, numéro spécial de Naturopa No 103 / 2005, Conseil de l’Europe, Strasbourg
- Je me souviens de Bruxelles, Dix-neuf auteurs se racontent en ville, Escales du Nord, Le Castor Astral, 2006
- Plus juillet que ça tu meurs, anthologie Au jour le jour, textes rassemblés par Corina Ciocârlie, collection aphinités, Éditions phi, (Luxembourg), 2006
- ''Il seminatore di parole, (Le semeur de paroles, nouvelle traduite par Stefania Ricciardi), dans "Le parole dei luoghi", anthologie des auteurs nominés au "Premio Stellato", edizioni Marli, Salerno, Italie, 2006
- Rabiot dans les jours, dix textes en prose, dans: Neige d’août, revue de littérature & d’Extrême-Orient, No 15 automne 2006, 58210 Champlemy, France
- Le murmure du monde, extraits dans L’année poétique 2007, présenté par Patrice Delbourg et Jean-Luc Maxence, Éditions Seghers, Paris 2007
- La promesse de Wenders / Refuge exotique (avec une présentation de Jean-Pascal Dubost,) dans Gare maritime, revue (annuelle) écrite et sonore de poésie contemporaine, Maison de la poésie de Nantes, 2007
- Les repentirs de Froberger, quatrains, dans Littérature et peinture sauvages, Les coups de cœur de Pirotte, Les Amis des Ardennes, No 16, printemps 2007
- Question suspendue, in l’anthologie Au bout du bar, ouvrage coordonné par Jacques Josse, Éditions Apogée, Rennes, 2007
- Le silence inutile, excerpts translated into German by Georges Hausemer in l’anthologie "Völkerfrei" (Klaus Wiegerling, Hg.), Edition Krautgarten, St. Vith, Belgique, 2007
- La pèlerine syllabique pour protéger la pâle nudité, discours lors de la réception du Prix Servais, in: Prix Servais 2007, publication de la Fondation Servais, 2007
- Où demeurer ailleurs que là, anthologie éponyme, textes rassemblés par Corina Ciocârlie, Éditions phi, coll. aphinités, (Luxembourg) 2007
- Le traverseur du jour, dans Poésies de langue française, 144 poètes d’aujourd’hui autour du monde, anthologie présentée par Stéphane Bataillon, Sylvestre Clancier et Bruno Doucey, Éditions Seghers, 2008
- Nous ne savons rien de la lune, dans Espaces, fictions européennes, trente écrivains européens écrivent sur le thème de l’espace, un volume avec les contributions en langue originale avec traduction française et un volume en version anglaise, Observatoire de l’Espace / CNES, 2008
- L’épreuve, dans "Konterlamonter", 19 écrivains fantasment autour du sport, anthologie trilingue, textes rassemblés par Georges Hausemer, photographs by Jeanine Unsen, Éditions Guy Binsfeld, 2008, ISBN 978-2-87954-200-3
- Postface à Maram al-Masri, Je te menace d’une colombe blanche, Éditions Seghers, collection Autour du monde, 2008, ISBN 2-232-12304-9
- Le tram de Beggen et autres micromythologèmes, dans "Wat mir sin", Petites mythologies du Grand-Duché, textes rassemblés par Corina Ciocârlie, Éditions phi, coll. aphinités, 2008, ISBN 978-2-87962-259-0
- La promesse de Wenders et autres rédactions, cinq textes avec traduction en allemand par l’auteur, dans Park, № 63, Juni 2009, Zeitschrift für neue Literatur, Berlin,
- Moränen, Prosa-Text, in : Zwischenland ! Ausguckland!, Literarische Kurzprosa aus Luxemburg, Röhrig Universitätsverlag, 2009, ISBN 978-3-86110-470-4
- Un tas d’images brisées, dans : Jours enfantins au royaume du Luxembourg, textes rassemblés par Corina Ciocârlie, Éditions phi, coll. aphinités, 2010, ISBN 978-2-87962-277-4
- Ostinato, huit poèmes, dans Le Fram, revue semestrielle de littérature, № 21, printemps 2010
- Myriades d’anémones / L’encre c’est de la nuit liquide, deux poèmes, anthologie des poètes de « Voix vives de méditerranée en méditerranée, Sète », éditions Bruno Doucey, 2011
- Hola camarde, neuf nano scénarios, dans : Hasta la vista, Johnny !, anthologie sur le cinéma, édition Guy Binsfeld / Walfer Bicherdeeg, 2011
- Le fracas des nuages, fragments, 25 pages, in : Les moments littéraires, Revue de littérature, № 26, 2011, ISSN 1292-7406
- L’araignée rescapée, poème, in : anthologie Lesen in einem Zug / En train de lire / E Buch am Zug, Initiative Plaisir de lire / Centre national de littérature, 2011
- Amaryllis Treblinka, fragments, 16 pages, in : Première Ligne, revue littéraire, № 1, printemps 2012, ISBN 978-2-916071-88-6
- Choses à dire, poème, dans : Grandes Voix Francophones, 42 auteurs de la francophonie, édition Fondation Prince Amine Laourou, s.d. (2012)
- Le silence inutile / Le murmure du monde, 10 pages, in : Literaresch Welten, eng lëtzebuerger Anthologie an dräi Sproochen, Ministère de l’Education nationale et de le Formation professionnelle, Luxembourg, 2012
- Le timbalier de Salerne, et autres incidents plutôt mortifères, cinq nouvelles, in : Première Ligne, revue littéraire, № 2, automne 2012, ISBN 978-2-916071-88-6
- Six neuvains, avec traduction allemande par Bruno Karthäuser, in Krautgarten, № 61, November 2012
- La hache destroy, anthologie Perdus de vue, dans : Supplément livres, Tageblatt, № novembre-décembre 2012
- Deux neuvains, traduits en polonais par Urszula Kozioł, in Obra 2/2013, revue de littérature, Wroclaw, Pologne
- Sur le pavé de ma cour, la nuit, neuvain, anthologie "Momento nudo", 47 auteurs, éditions l'Arbre à parole, 2013, ISBN 978-2-87406-554-5
- A l'opposto di ogni posto, poèmes du livre éponyme (edizioni interlinea), avec préface de Clemente Condello, dans: Poesia, Mensile internazionale di cultura poetica, Milano, Anno XXVI, Novembre 2013, pp. 61–75
- Tomber tomber tomber, neuvains, Première Ligne, revue littéraire, No 3, automne 2013, pp. 120–130, ISBN 978-2-916071-97-8
- Neuvain pour A.P. [Anna Politkovskaïa], anthologie "Liberté de créer, liberté de crier", édité par le PEN Club français, éditions Les Ecrits du Nord / éditions Henry, 2014, ISBN 978-2-36469-069-1
- Vient l'été avec ses missives et ses mouches, neuvain, "Voix vives", anthologie Sète 2014, éditions Bruno Doucey, 2014, ISBN 9 782362 290695
- Cinq poèmes, traduits en slovène par Primož Vitez, anthologie slovène d'auteurs luxembourgeois "Hällewull", Društvo slovenskih pisateljev, Ljubljana, 2014, ISBN 978-961-6547-81-9
- La Théorie de l'Univers, 48 distiques décasyllabiques, La Revue des Archers, publication littéraire semestrielle – Juin 2014, pp. 106–111, ISBN 978-2-918947-06-6
- inaudible chuchotis / les insignifiances du moment / lascivité universelle, proseries, 'Le paresseux', journal de lectures littéraires, No 32, novembre 2014, ISSN 1249-6553
- Inévitables bifurcations, extraits: chapitres 4, 36, 45, 56, La Revue des Archers, publication littéraire semestrielle, décembre 2014, pp. 125–128, ISBN 978-2-918947-07-3
- Procès-verbal de l'ambulancier, quatrains, anthologie "Ce qui est écrit change à chaque instant", 101 poètes, éditions Le Castor astral, 2015, ISBN 9 791027 80039 1
- Une série de poèmes extraits de Honda rouge et cent pigeons et de Le Papillon de Solutré, in: "Scrie-acum, scrie", anthologie de poésie luxembourgeoise en langue roumaine, traduction par Philippe Blasen et Nora Chelaru, Casa Cărţii de Ştiinţă, Cluj-Napoca, Roumanie, 2015, ISBN 978-606-17-0795-9
- Sous la robedans "Les Vêtements dans la littérature au Luxermbourg", anthologie, Centre national de littérature / initiative Plaisir de lire, 2016
- Ce n'est pas ma langue, un neuvain, dans "Éloge et défense de la langue française", 137 poètes planétaires, 10 lettres ouvertes, 5 peintres, sous la direction de Pablo Poblete et Claudine Bertrand, éditions unicité, 2016, (ISBN 978-2-37355-031-3)
- Fragments du journal intime de Dieu, dans "Les Cahiers luxembourgeois", 2016, No 1, p. 55–69, novembre 2016 69
- La hache destroy, dans "Perdus de vue", petite anthologie de la disparition, section grand-ducale, textes rassemblés par Corina Ciocârlie, éditions phi, collection aphinités, vol. 6, 2016, pp. 73–78, (ISBN 978-99959-37-23-2)
- Gefeuert, dans "Gedanken reisen, Einfälle kommen an", Die Welt der Notiz, Periodikum "Sichtungen", 16./17. Jahrgang, herausgegeben im Auftrag des Literaturarchivs der Österreichischen Nationalbibliothek und der Wienbibliothek im Rathaus, von Marcel Atze und Volker Kaukoreit, Praesens Verlag, 2017, S. 93–102 (mit 4 Abbildungen), ISSN 1680-8975, (ISBN 978-3-7069-0837-5)
- Auf den Spuren von Gerhard Meier, périodique littéraire "Livres / Bücher", Tageblatt, mars-avril 2017
- Sur la raide corde danser, neuvain, "Voix vives", anthologie Sète 2017, éditions Bruno Doucey, 2017, (ISBN 9 78236 2291579)
- Les dépêches de Kliphuis, dix proseries, sur "Recours au poème", mars 2018

== Bibliography ==
- Wilhelm, Frank: Schlechter, Lambert. p. 534 in: Goetzinger, Germaine & Claude D. Conter: 2007. Luxemburger Autorenlexikon; (in German) Publications nationales du Ministère de la culture. Centre national de littérature, Mersch, ò2007, 687 p. ISBN 978-2-919903-06-1.
