= Marcel Rewenig =

Luxembourgish footballer

Personal information
- Date of birth: 16 January 1921
- Date of death: 2 September 2004 (aged 83)
- Position: Forward

Senior career*
| Years | Team | Apps | (Gls) |
- Spora Luxembourg

International career
| 1946–1952 | Luxembourg | 24 | (2) |
- * Club domestic league appearances and goals

Marcel Rewenig (16 January 1921 – 2 September 2004) was a Luxembourgish footballer who played as a forward. He made 24 appearances for the Luxembourg national team from 1946 to 1952. He was also part of Luxembourg's squad for the football tournament at the 1948 Summer Olympics, but he did not play in any matches. He was the father of author Guy Rewenig.

During a derby game in 1950 against Union Luxembourg, Rewenig was singled out in the match analysis by the Luxemburger Wort, who commended his "great play for forcing a fair draw", noting that every attack from Spora came from him despite difficult playing conditions with frozen snow on the pitch. He received plaudits for his "wonderful technique right up to the final whistle", where he helped secure his team a 2-2 draw.
