= National Literature Centre =

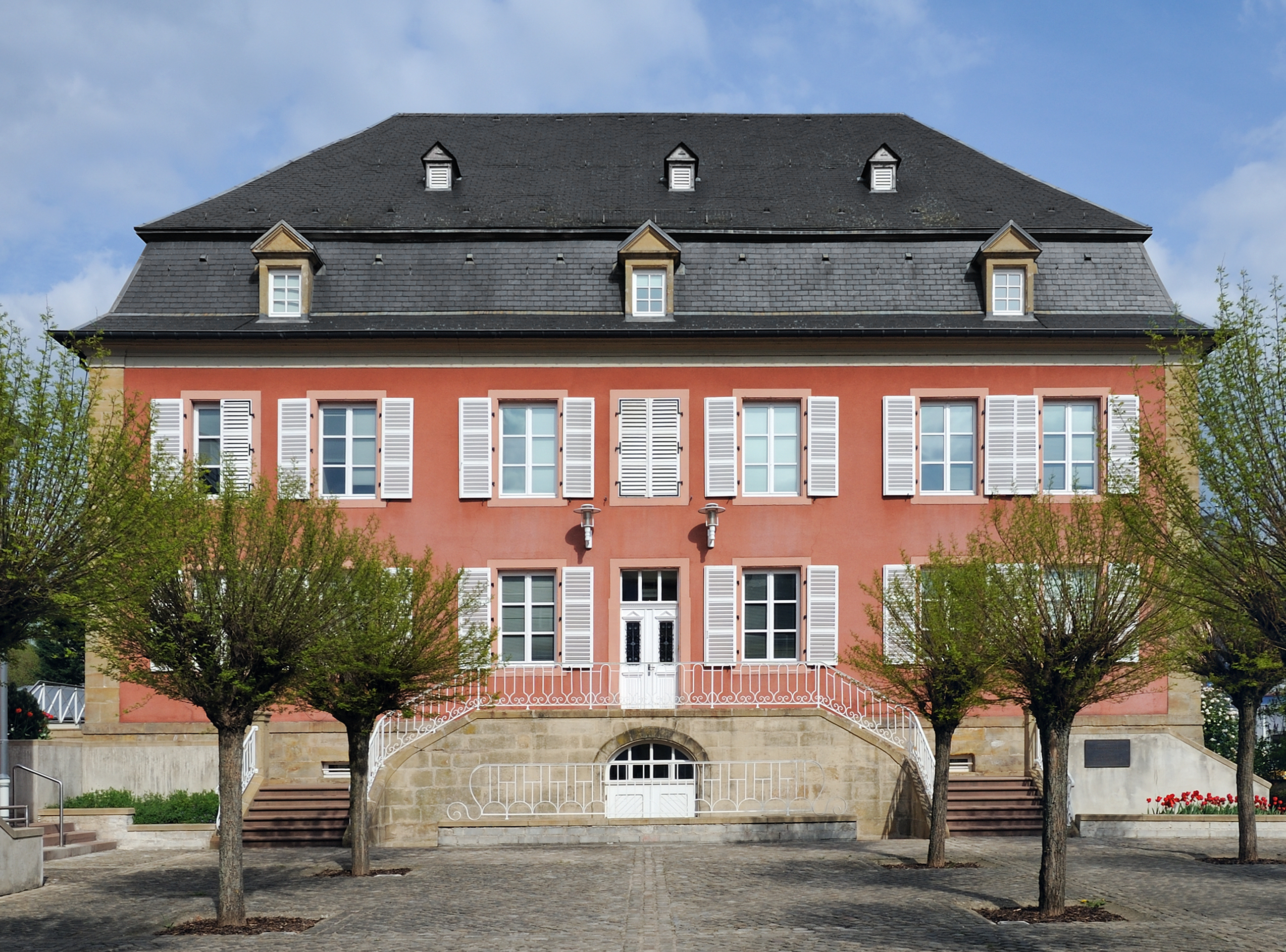
The Maison Servais, home of the CNL

The National Literature Centre (Luxembourgish: Lëtzebuerger Literaturarchiv, French: Centre national de littérature), abbreviated CNL, is the national literary archive of Luxembourg. It is based in the town of Mersch, about 15 kilometers to the north of Luxembourg City. Created as a research library in 1995, the CNL's collections include more than 40,000 volumes, a majority of them written by authors of Luxembourgish descent or residing in Luxembourg, as well as an ever-growing collection of manuscripts, letters and personal items. The library also collects newspaper clippings relating to Luxembourgish literature and literary journals and serials. As one of Luxembourg's legal deposit libraries, it receives copies of nearly all books produced in Luxembourg and actively purchases monographs by Luxembourgish authors printed abroad.

== Historical background ==
In 1995, the CNL was created as a part of the Luxembourg national archives. The idea was to assemble all documents relating to the literary life in Luxembourg, both contemporary and historical, in a single place and thus to create a focal point for literary researchers. In addition to encouraging and facilitating research, the CNL also promotes contemporary literary output, by organising exhibitions, conferences, reading sessions and various events relating to literature in Luxembourg. Since 2005, the CNL is a fully-fledged independent cultural institute.

The literary center is housed in the Maison Servais, a large 17th-century mansion which once belonged to the Luxembourgish politician Emmanuel Servais. The last inhabitant of the mansion, Jeanne Servais, donated the house to the town of Mersch. The premises were then handed over to the State of Luxembourg, who renovated the house and installed the Centre national de littérature in it. The main building now houses five exhibition rooms, the library, a reading room, researchers' and administrative offices and two conference rooms. A newly erected second building houses the literary café, which is used for various literary get-togethers. Both buildings are flanked by a public park.

The CNL's premises are currently undergoing extension. In early 2008, the adjacent building, which is now being renovated, will house a part of the archives' storage and office facilities.

== Access to the collections ==
The CNL's collections can be consulted by researchers and students as well as interested members of the public. It is however not a general public library, but rather a research library specializing in Luxemburgensia. A range of Luxembourgish newspapers and reference works such as dictionaries and encyclopedias can be freely accessed in the reading room. The library's catalogue can be consulted on the Luxembourg National Library's integrated catalogue, which is based on the commercial Integrated Library System Aleph. The library also offers other specialised catalogues and research services.

== Exhibitions ==
The CNL regularly organises exhibitions which often display manuscripts or other precious items from the archives' funds to the general public. The exhibitions deal with Luxembourgish literary life in the broadest sense, and often highlight cultural exchanges between Luxembourgish and German or French authors.

=== Exhibition catalogues ===
- Hôtes de Colpach. 1997
- Kontakte, Kontexte. 1999
- Lëtzebuergesch - "eng Ried déi vun allen am meeschten em ons klengt". 2000
- Un défi - 20 ans d'éditions Phi. 2001
- De Michel Rodange 'Op en Neis fotografëert'. 2002 (incl. CD)
- Choc et vision. 2005

== Literary research ==
Apart from helping other researchers in their work, the CNL also does its own literary research. It regularly publishes exhibition catalogues, essays on Luxembourgish literature and scholarly re-editions of important works by Luxembourgish authors. A list of the CNL's publications shows that the institute's research tries to reflect the ample use of each of the country's three national languages, namely Luxembourgish, French and German.

=== Nei Lëtzebuerger Bibliothéik ===
In this series (which, in English, means: New Luxembourgish Library) are published commented re-editions of Luxembourgish literary works. The aim is to give the reader an insight into the life and work of an author, an understanding of the times in which the work was written and a bibliography which enables further research. As of 2007, thirteen volumes have been published:

- Michel Rodange: D'Léierchen
- Félix Thyes: Marc Bruno
- Nik Welter: Lene Frank
- Edmond de la Fontaine: Mumm Séis/Mutter Suse
- Paul Palgen: Choix de poèmes
- Nikolaus Hein: Der Verräter
- Isi Comes: 7 Erzielongen
- Alexander Weicker: Fetzen
- Batty Weber: Fenn Kass
- Joseph Funck: Kleines Schicksal
- Pol Michels: Choix de textes
- Antoine Meyer: E Schréck op de Lëtzebuerger Parnassus (incl. CD)
- Frantz Clement: Zickzack

=== Bibliographie courante ===
This annual bibliography is a compilation of all books and articles written in Luxembourg or abroad on the literary production in Luxembourg, including such areas as theatre and linguistics.

== See also ==
- Literature of Luxembourg
