= Antoine Meyer =

Poet (1801–1857)

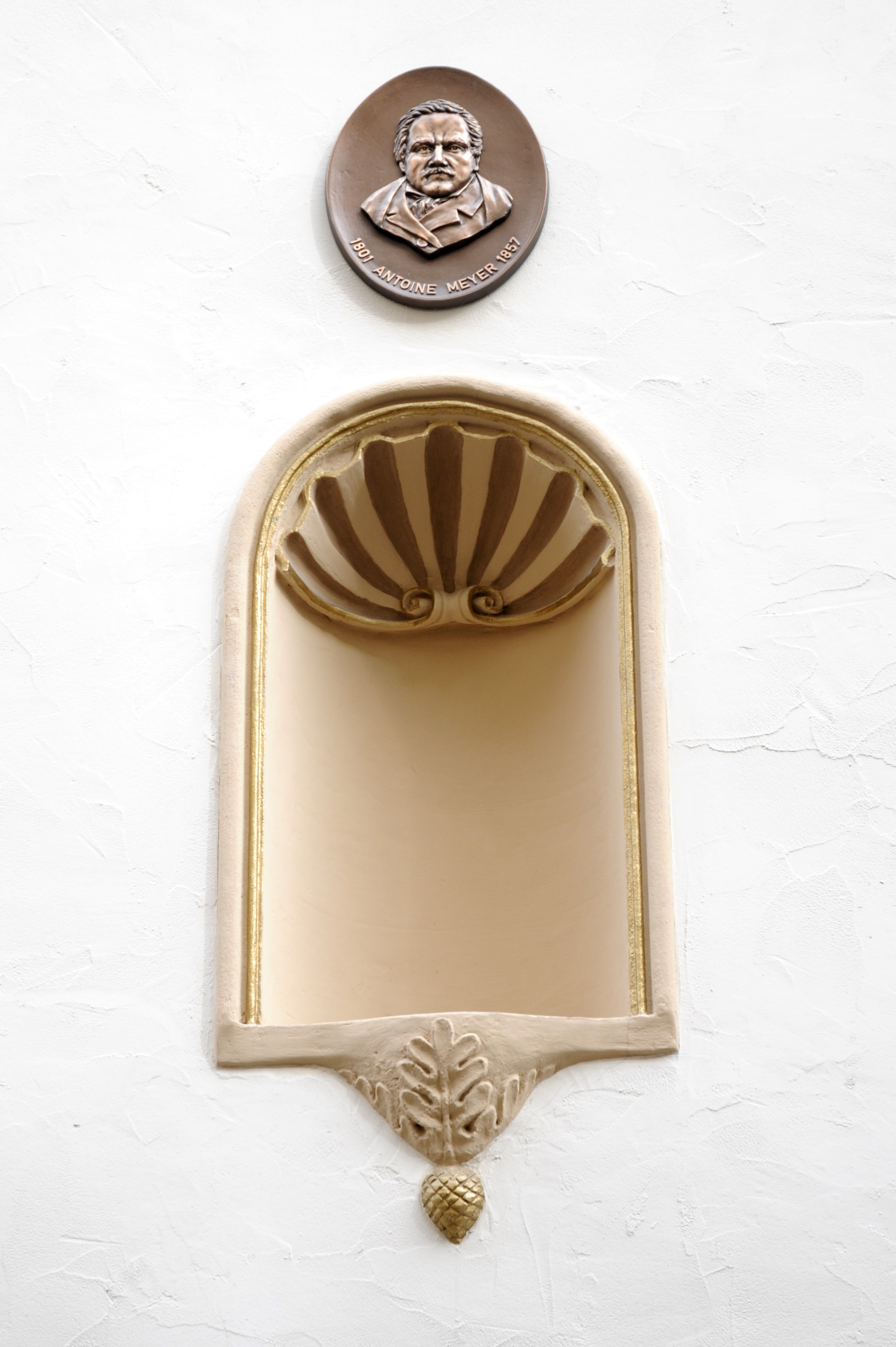
Luxembourg-City, 3, rue Chimay, where Antoine Meyer (1801–1857) was born

Antoine Meyer, also known as Antun or Tun Meyer (1801–1857) was a Luxembourg-born mathematician and poet who later adopted Belgian nationality. Sometimes referred to as the father of Luxembourgish literature, he is remembered for publishing the very first book in Luxembourgish, a collection of six poems entitled "E' Schrek ob de' lezeburger Parnassus" (A Step up the Luxembourg Parnassus).

== Early life ==
Born on 31 May 1801 in Luxembourg City, Meyer was the son of Hubert Meyer, a shoemaker, and his wife Elisabeth Kirschenbilder who lived in the centre of the old town close to the Place d'Armes. After completing his secondary school education with flying colours at the local Athénée, he studied mathematics at Liège (1817–1823) where he was forced to give private lessons to his fellow students and help out in the library in order to pay for his studies. After receiving his doctorate, he spent an additional year in Paris studying at the Collège de France and at the Sorbonne where he came into contact with Europe's leading mathematicians.

== Career ==
Professionally, Meyer was a brilliant mathematics teacher. In 1826, he taught at the Collège royal at Echternach in Luxembourg before moving to Breda in the Netherlands in 1828 where he worked at the newly opened Royal Military Academy. However, when two years later the Belgians rose up against the Dutch, he had to leave the country. After enormous difficulties, he finally succeeded in finding a job in Belgium at a school in Louvain. He spent a short period at the Institut Gaggia (1834) in Brussels but was then offered a post at the military school before going on to the Université libre de Bruxelles in 1838. In 1849, he became a professor of higher mathematics at the Université de Liège until his death in 1857. For historical reasons, after the separation of Belgian Luxembourg, Meyer acquired Belgian nationality in 1842. The strong recognition he received for his mathematical publications and achievements testify to his full adoption by the Belgians. However, his poems show his lifelong attachment to Luxembourg.

== Poetry ==
Antoine Meyer's publication of "E' Schrek ob de' Lezeburger Parnassus" in 1829 was not received with very much enthusiasm. There were however one or two strong supporters. Félix Thyes, who coincidentally was the first Luxembourger to publish a book in French, commented: "It is Monsieur Antoine Meyer, a mathematics professor at the University of Liège, who has the honour of being the first to rescue this tongue from the indifference and scorn in which it is immersed, creating, as it were, a new literature. The good Luxembourgers were amazed, one morning, when they heard that the learned mathematician had just published a small volume of poems in their own language." The book contains six poems, a love poem: "Uen d'Christine" (To Christine), a meditation on the romantic subject of night: "D'Nuecht" (The Night), a kind of real life painting: "Een Abléck an engem Wiertshaus zu Lëtzebuerg" (A Moment in a Luxembourg Inn), and three fables: "D'porzelains an d'ierde Schierbel" (The Shard of Porcelain and the Earthen Pot), "D'Spéngel an d'Nol" (The Pin and the Needle) and "D'Flou an de Pierdskrécher" (The Fly and the Horse Trough). In regard to the fables, while Aesop and La Fontaine built their stories around animals, Meyer personified inanimate objects. For example, in "D'Spéngel an d'Nol", the well-to-do Miss Needle tries but fails to override the Pin, reflecting the failure of the French aristocracy to prevent the French Revolution.

The mathematician went on to write three more poetic works as well as a booklet on spelling rules for Luxembourgish. A number of other poems by Antoine Meyer were published in the press. In his own words, Meyer's objective was to show that "the Luxembourg dialect is not as rough, poor, unregulated, stiff and barbarous as many born Luxembourgers would like to maintain". Félix Thyes commented: "We see in Mr Meyer, that noble pride of the plebeian, that instinct for liberty and often that burning concern for the poorer classes which can be found among all true poets of our times." It is now recognized that he succeeded in initiating the transformation of Luxembourgish into an acceptable literary language.

Antoine Meyer died in Liège on 29 April 1857.

== Works ==
- 1829: "E' Schrek ob de' lezeburger Parnassus". Collection of poems published in Luxembourg (Lezeburg)
- 1832: "Jong vum Schrek op de Lezeburger Parnassus". Collection of poems published in Louvain
- 1845: "Luxemburgische Gedichte und Fabeln". Together with works by Heinrich Gloden. Published in Brussels
- 1853: "Oilzegt-Kläng". Collection of poems published in Liège (Lüttich)
- 1854: "Règelbüchelchen vum lezeburger Orthoegraf". Rules of Luxembourg Spelling. Published in Liège
