= De Scholdschäin =

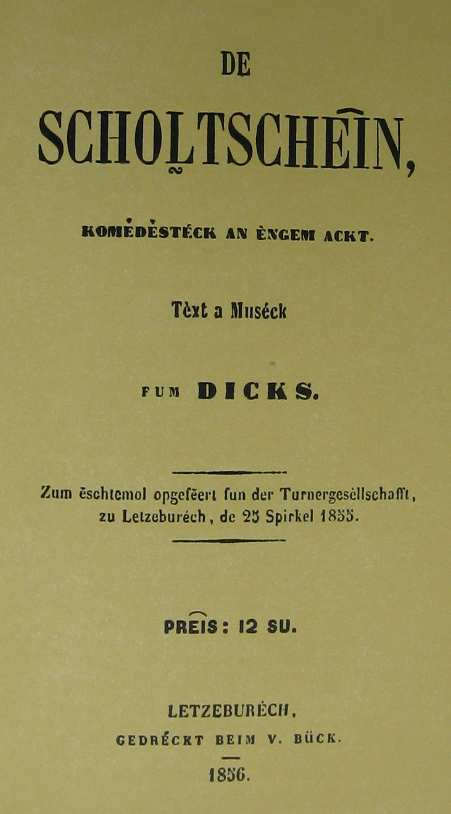
The title page of the original 1856 printing.

De Scholdschäin (originally "De Scholtschêin"; English: The Promissory Note) is a comedic operetta in Luxembourgish, written in 1855 by Dicks (Edmond de la Fontaine, 1823–1891). In the official catalogue of Dicks' works, De Scholdschäin is numbered Opus 14.

De Scholdschäin is the first operetta written in the Luxembourgish language. It premiered on 25 February 1855 at the Société de gymnastique (Gym) and was published the following year.

== Plot ==
Papschossel, an old bookbinder, is in love with Marrĕ; Marrĕ's mother approves of the match. However, Marrĕ is in love with Néckel, a chimneysweep. Papschossel attempts to blackmail Marrĕ with a promissory note for money lent to him by Marrĕ's deceased father; the latter had indeed paid the money back, but the note had not been returned. Marrĕ, with Něckel's help, steals the promissory note, and Papschossel is beaten.

== Characters ==
- Marrĕ, a young girl;
- Marrĕ's mother;
- Néckel, a chimneysweep;
- Papschossel, an old bookbinder.

== Premiere ==
On 25 February 1855, the play premiered at Luxembourg's Société de gymnastique (Gym), with Michel Lentz and Nic Martha directing. Because women were barred from performing on stage, the roles were played by Victor Hoffmann, Jean Pierre Küntgen, and Franz and Albert Poncin.

Although De Scholdchäin was the first operetta written in Luxembourgish (with characters even justifying this choice during the piece's premiere), it was not the first play written in the language; this was Prënz Carneval an de Prënz Faaschtdag (EN: Prince Carnival and Prince Lent), which also premiered at the Gym six years prior.
