= Guy Helminger =

Luxembourgish author (born 1963)

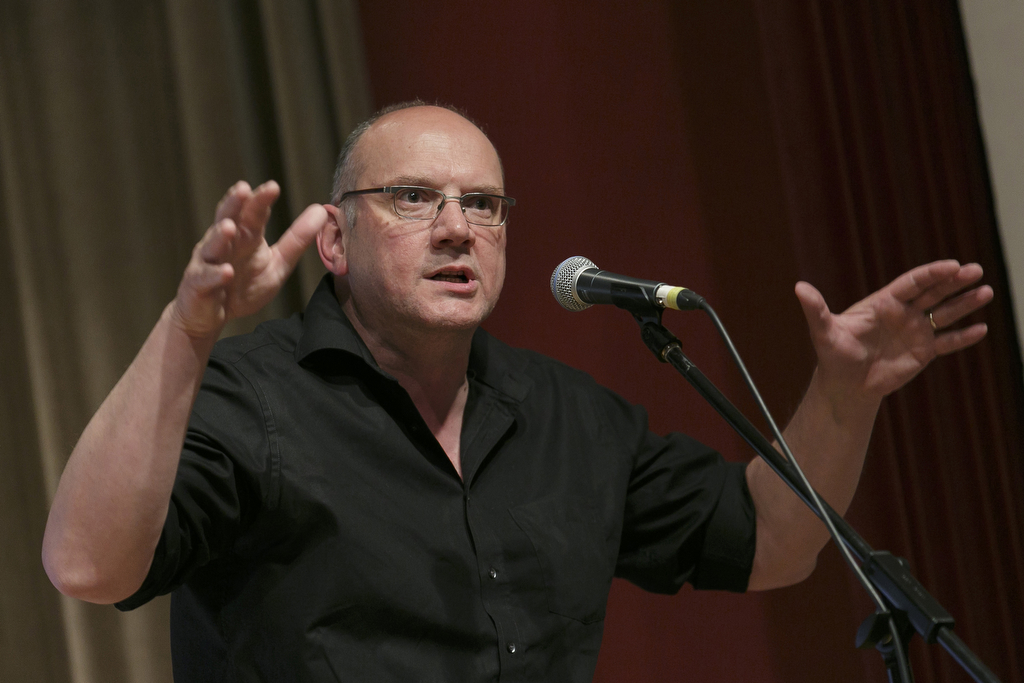
Helminger in 2014

Guy Helminger (born 1963) is a Luxembourgish author who has written a number of successful novels and plays in German.

== Biography ==
Guy Helminger, the younger brother of author Nico Helminger, was born on 20 January 1963 in Esch-sur-Alzette in south-western Luxembourg. He studied German literature and philosophy in Luxembourg, Heidelberg and Cologne where he has lived since 1985. His literary work includes poetry, drama and novels. His award-winning play Morgen ist Regen, translated into English as "Venezuela", was performed at London's Arcola Theatre in March 2003.

In 2002, Helminger was awarded the Servais Prize for Rost, a collection of short stories.

== Selected works ==
- Guy Helminger, "Neubrasilien", Frankfut-am-Main: Eichborn, 2010. pp. 315 ISBN 978-3-8218-6132-6 (in German)
- Guy Helminger, "Morgen war schon", Frankfut-am-Main: Eichborn, 2007. pp. 331 ISBN 978-3-518-41918-2 (in German)
- Guy Helminger, "Etwas fehlt immer", Frankfut-am-Main: Eichborn, 2007. pp. 268 ISBN 978-3-518-45919-5
- Guy Helminger, Manuel Andrack: "Die Ruhe der Schlammkröte", Kiepenheuer & Witsch: Cologne, 2007, ISBN 3-462-03784-6
- Guy Helminger, Penny Black (translator), "Venezuela", London: Oberon Books, 2003, pp. 63 ISBN 1-84002-365-1
- Guy Helminger, "Rost", Echternach: Editions Phi, 2001, pp. 136 ISBN 978-3-88865-202-8 (in German)
