= Nico Helminger =

Luxembourgish author (born 1953)

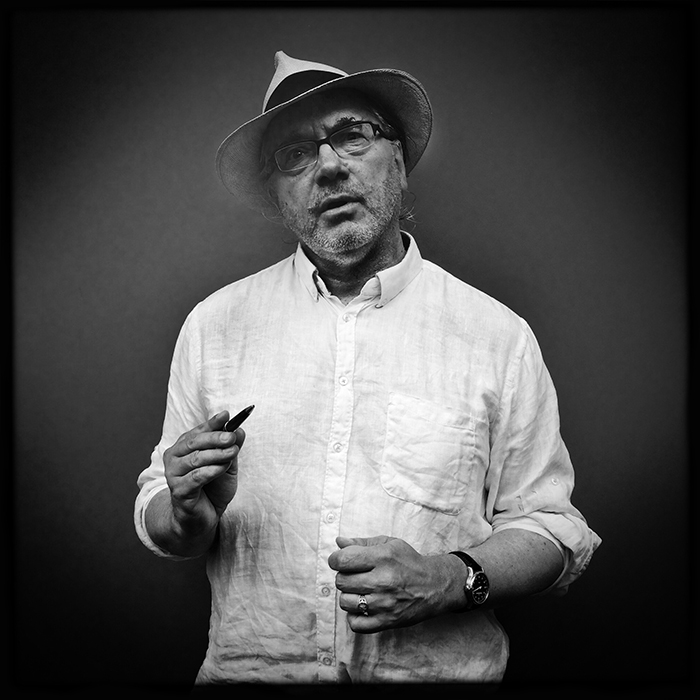
Portrait of Nico Helminger 2015

Nico Helminger (born 1953) is a Luxembourgish author who has written poetry, novels, plays and libretti for operas. In 2008, he was awarded the Batty Weber Prize for his literary work.

== Biography ==
Born on 1 July 1953 in Differdange, he is the elder brother of the author Guy Helminger. After graduating from high school in 1972, Helminger went on to study German, Romance linguistics and drama in Luxembourg, Saarbrücken, Vienna and Berlin. In 1980, he went to Paris where he taught German and history at secondary school. From 1984, he became an independent writer working in Munich, Heidelberg, Paris and Luxemburg, finally settling in Esch-sur-Alzette in 1999.

Helminger has written socially critical plays such as Miss Minett und de schantchen in which he brings out the psychological and social problems suffered in the industrial south-western area of Luxembourg. Other works like Kitsch, Läschten eens käe liewen, and Kurzgeschichten address domestic violence and loss of hope and purpose as symptoms of an inhuman, materialistic society. He ascribes these trends to the repression of political and social issues as a result of the Second World War, the power of the church and the media. In his later works (In eigener säure, Grenzgang) he introduces increasingly poetic, intertextual and multilingual elements.
