= Computer Networks Laboratory =

Slovak research institute

The Computer Networks Laboratory was formed in 1995 as a result of the solution of research tasks and pilot projects in cooperation with the industry. It is a joint contractual research and experimental work station KPI FEI TU and elfa s.r.o. Currently it is a top work station involved in the progressive network technologies in the Slovak Republic and highly appreciated also by the international expert community (during its existence this lab was awarded number of international awards). The main research objective of the lab are computer networks and progressive network infrastructures emphasizing the issue of the information transfer of the multimedia nature with the required quality of services parameters (QoS). Special attention is paid to the following areas:

- The effective methods of quality service property parameters assessment,
- Implementation of the powerful streaming technologies in the IP network environment,
- Videoconference solution and voice services of the new generation,
- Monitoring, control and visualization of topologies in LAN and WAN,
- Virtual communication infrastructures and their use in practical (e-learning technologies and their solutions).

Based on CNL the first Regional Cisco Network Academy (RCNA) came into being in the Slovak Republic in 1999 providing certified education of the network specialists on the basis of industrial standards effective on the whole territory of the Slovak Republic within the NetAcad Program (Networking Academy) implementation.

The lab premises consist of a complex of five rooms with top equipment suitable for provision of teaching in the respective area, but also for extensive specialized and research activities implemented on the lab basis.

The lab offers an integrated educational process in the field of information and communication technologies emphasizing the issue of computer networks, their design, administration and management. In the lab premises specialized teaching of courses and events oriented on network technologies and teaching within NetAcad program (network academy program CISCO) is implemented. LPS has university significance currently offering teaching for more than 200 students of the Technical University annually. The lab is built in cooperation with a whole range of other external sponsors, especially Cisco Systems Company.

In cooperation with T-com (Slovak Telecom, a.s.) and experimental nod of the WAN network with access to WAN ATM ST, a.s. as the first experimental and training segment on the basis of the ATM technology in the Technical University Campus and the first specialized work station in the Slovak Republic and the Czech Republic for training of network specialists on the basis of the network academy program Cisco-NetAcad was built in the premises of LPS.

The lab has at its disposal the videoconference systems for organization of IP videoconferences.

In LPS successful functional model of involvement of students in the scientific and research activities was built. The students are admitted in the LPS on the basis of internal selection proceedings and after they become members of LPS they take part in the solution of international projects.

On the lab basis almost one hundred diploma works, semester projects, and scientific and specialized works of student were awarded several awards; also on international level.

Currently, LPS is internationally recognized as a centre of e-learning technologies and the preparation of network specialists in the Slovak Republic. Results which were achieved over the long-term in the area of pilot projects found positive response among regional and international experts. Regional academy based on LPS acquired several international award (Paris 2000, Copenhagen 2002 academy of the year in the region Europe, Middle East and Africa) and in 2001 the lab received an award at a conference COFAX from the ATM Association in the Slovak Republic for the set of „Pilot Project“. The latest CNL award is the award of the „Project of the Year” received by RCNA at CNL in Valencia (Spain) in September 2005 at an annual conference of more than 3000 schools involved in the NetAcad project in Europe for the project “IP Telephony for the academic sphere in the Slovak Republic“.

Appreciation of the results achieved within CNL is underlined by the fact that Mr. F. Jakab was received the prize “IT personality of the year 2006“ that is awarded every year by the representatives of the most significant IT media and informal associations in the Slovak Republic as the only person from TUKE at all.

The lab is frequently visited by renowned experts from foreign university departments as a part of the programs of internships and placements.

== CNL activities and function ==
- Implementation of teaching of disciplines oriented on the computer networks and network infrastructures in the field of Computer Technology and Informatics studies,
- Coordination of implementation of the NetAcad Program (Network Academic Program Cisco) within the educational process at the Technical University,
- Operation of the Regional Network Academy CISCO (RCNA),
- Preparation of teachers and students for internationally recognized certification tests CCNA and CCNP,
- Pedagogic, research, coordination and expert centre of network, information and tele-educational infrastructures of the Technical University,
- Contact video-conference centre of the Technical University,
- Coordination of the department with the businesses in the field of network technologies.
