= Georges Hausemer =

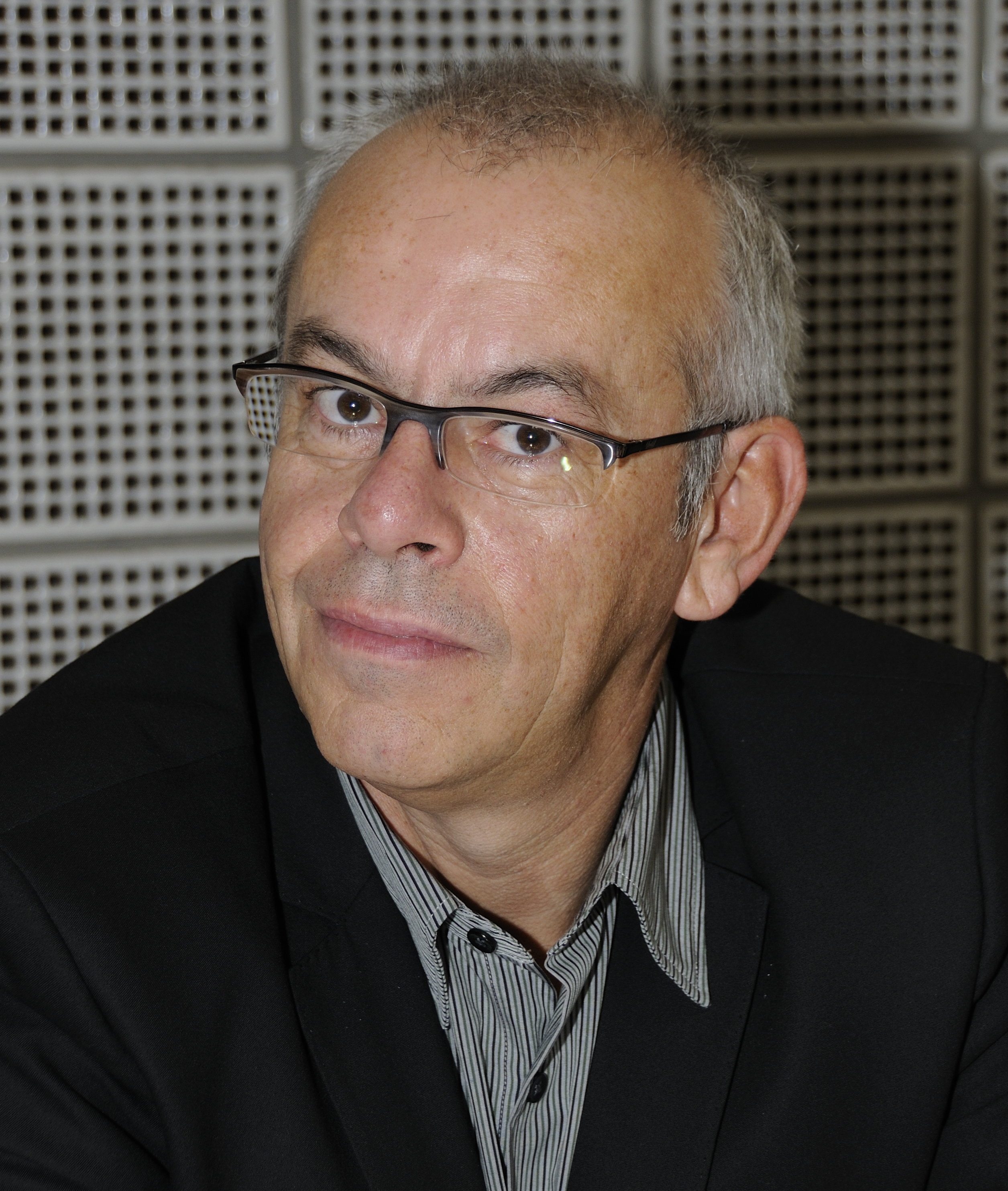
The Georges Hausemer 2008

Georges Hausemer (1 February 1957 – 13 August 2018) was a Luxembourgish writer who published short stories, novels, travelogues and non-fictional works and also translated a considerable number of works from French, English, Spanish and Luxembourgish into German. Sometimes using the pen name Theo Selmer, he also worked as an illustrator.

== Biography ==
Born on 1 February 1957 in Differdange, Hausemer studied journalism and romance languages in Salzburg and Mainz. Since 1984, he has worked as a freelance author, translator and travel writer in Esch-sur-Alzette. He frequently contributed literary articles and reports to national and international newspapers. He travelled widely, publishing a number of books based on his journeys.

== Selected works ==
=== Non-fiction ===
- "D'Stad Lëtzebuerg (The City of Luxembourg) - Excursions and Impressions", photographer Rob Kieffer. Editions Guy Binsfeld. Luxembourg, 2000, pp. 240 ISBN 2-87954-076-3,
- "Echternach: Entdecken – Découvrir – Discover", photographer Guy Hoffmann, Editions Guy Binsfeld 2005, pp. 128 ISBN 978-2-87954-148-8.
- "Culinary Luxembourg: Country, People & Cuisine", photographer Guy Hoffman, Editions Guy Binsfeld, Luxembourg, 2009, pp. 240 ISBN 2-87954-052-6

=== Fiction ===
- Die Gesetze der Schwerkraft. Editions Phi, Echternach, 1995, pp. 124 ISBN 3-88865-127-1 (in German)
- Die Tote aus Arlon. Gollenstein Verlag, Blieskastel, 1997, pp. 240 ISBN 3-930008-52-1 (in German)
- Iwwer Waasser. Roman, Editions Phi, Echternach 1998, pp. 192 ISBN 3-88865-161-1 (in Luxembourgish)
