= Félix Thyes =

Luxembourgish author (1830-1855)

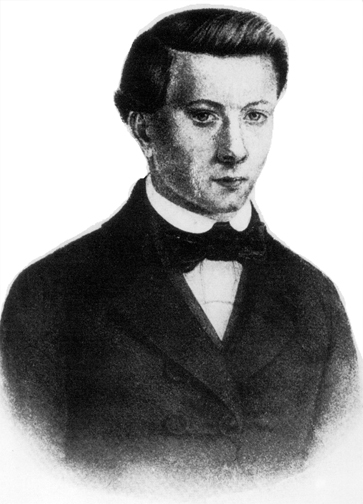

Félix Thyes (19 January 1830 – 8 May 1855) was a Luxembourgish writer. He is recognized as the first Luxembourgish author to write a novel in French. Marc Bruno, profil d'artiste was published shortly after his death in 1855. He was also the first literary historian to discuss literature written in Luxembourgish.

== His novel ==
Marc Bruno: portrait d'un artiste is a psychological novel associating romanticism with realism. It is the story of an unfortunate medical student in Brussels who pays his way by painting pictures in the attic where he lives. He falls in love with an aristocratic girl but she soon leaves him for someone of her own class. Finally he finds a girl he dearly loved during his childhood only to discover she is now a prostitute and wants to have nothing more to do with him. One morning he finds her body on a dissection table at the university. He finally decides to devote himself fully to medical practice and ends up in a small village where he can immerse himself in his work. But he soon falls in love once more.

== His essay ==
The Essai sur la Poésie luxembourgeoise was published in the Brussels Revue trimestrielle in 1854. In particular, Thyes commented positively and in some detail on Antoine Meyer's poetry as well as on the efforts of other Luxembourgers including Jacques Diedenhoven and Jean-François Gangler who wrote a number of works in Luxembourgish which were never published.
