= Jean Portante =

Luxembourgish writer (born 1950)

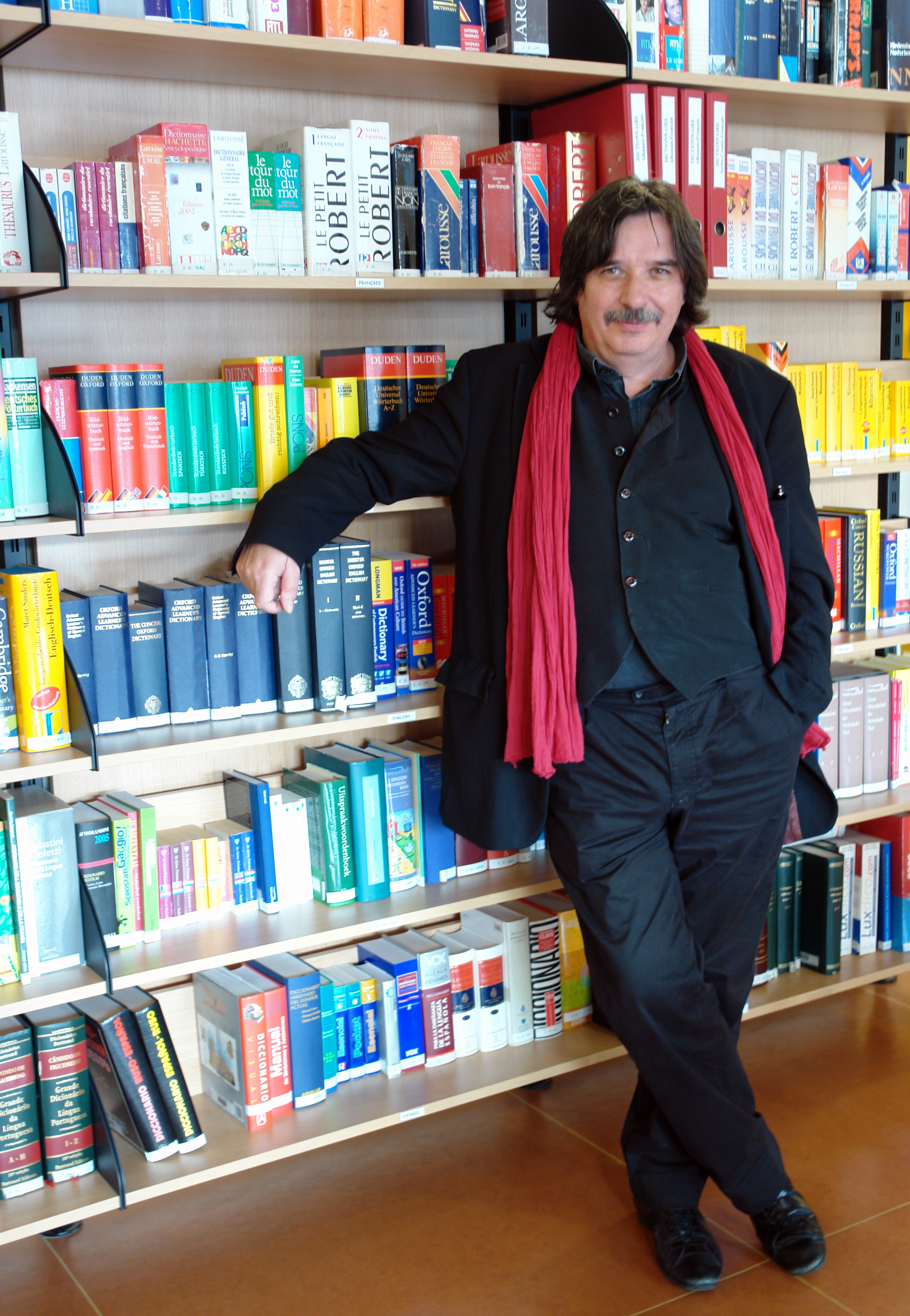
Jean Portante, 2010

Jean Portante (born 19 December 1950 in Differdange) is a Luxembourgish writer who resides in Paris. He has written novels, stories, plays, journalistic articles and poetry, and has been widely translated.

Numerous books have been translated including in English Point/Erasing, translated by Anne Marie Glasheen (Daedalus, 2003) and In Reality, translated by Zoë Skoulding (Seren Press, 2013). He is a translator of poetry into French from Spanish, Italian, English and German. His novels include Mrs Haroy ou la mémoire de la baleine (Editions Phi, 1997) among others, which has been translated into many languages, and he is also the author of the biography Allen Ginsberg: L'autre Amérique (Le Castor Astral, 1999). Portante’s collection of poems L’Etrange langue (Editions Le Taillis Pré, 2002) won the Mallarmé award in France in 2003, and the same year he was given the Grand Prix d’Automne de la Société des Gens de Lettres for his entire life’s work in poetry. In 2005, Le Castor Astral published a selected poems, La Cendre des mots, covering his work from 1989 to 2005. Since 2006 he has been a member of the Académie Mallarmé. In 2008 he co-founded the French poetry magazine Inuits dans la jungle with the poet Jacques Darras, while in Luxembourg he heads the literary magazine Transkrit. In 2011 he was awarded Luxembourg’s Batty Weber National Prize, which is given every three years for a life’s work. His latest books are En réalité (Editions Phi 2008); La réinvention de l'oubli (Editions le Castor Astral, 2010), Conceptions (Editions Phi, 2012) and Après le tremblement (Editions Le Castor Astral, 2013).

== Life ==
As he describes in his novel Mrs Haroy ou la mémoire de la baleine, from an early age he felt like a world citizen.

However, for Jean Portante, French is a language outside the dyad Italy–Luxembourg, a language learned, tamed, but which always remains to be conquered. Portante called it a "strange language" (the title of one of his collections which was awarded the French Prix Mallarmé in 2003).

Jean Portante started to write when he was 33 years. Before, he studied in Nancy, France. In 1983, when he wrote his first book of poems, Fire and mud, he moved to Paris. He translated works by Juan Gelman and Gonzalo Rojas into French.

Currently, he heads the Luxembourg collection Graphiti (poetry) editions. In France, he is a member of the Académie Mallarmé and the Prix Guillaume Apollinaire. In 2003 he received the Grand Award of the Society, for all his work, and the Prix Mallarmé. Previously, his novel Mrs. Haroy or the memory of the whale to be filmed in 2010 earned him Luxembourg's Servais Prize (best book of the year in any genre).

In Luxembourg, he founded in 2009 the literary magazine Transkrit, dedicated to translating contemporary literature, and Phi. In France, he co-founded, with Jacques Darras and Jean-Yves Reuzeau, the journal Inuits dans la jungle, the first issue being published in June 2008.

In March 2011, he was awarded the Batty Weber Prize for his work as a whole. The jury commented: "Since the beginning of the 1980s, Jean Portante has explored topics related to identity, from memory to forgetfulness, in various literary genres, especially poetry, the novel, drama and the essay. His literary style continues to evolve, marked by strong intertextuality, providing access to new interpretations and inciting pluralized reading." Mention was also made of Portante's efforts to "promote Luxembourg literature both at home and abroad".

== Awards ==
- 1986 Rutebeuf Prize for poetry, Horizon, vertige & italie intercalaire
- 1993 Tony Bourg Prize, Ouvert fermé (together with John Sorrento)
- 1994 Servais Prize, for Mrs Haroy ou la mémoire de la baleine
- 2003 Louis Montalto Poetry Award of the Society of Men of Letters, (for all his work)
- 2003 Mallarmé prize, for L’étrange langue
- 2011 Batty Weber Prize for his work as a whole

== Works (selection) ==
=== Novels ===
- Projets pour un naufrage prémédité. Ed. PHI, Luxembourg, 1987
- Un deux cha cha cha. Ed. PHI, Luxembourg, 1990
- Mrs Haroy ou la mémoire de la baleine, Editions PHI, Luxembourg, 1997
- Mourir partout sauf à Differdange. Roman. Editions PHI, Luxembourg, 2003

=== Poetry ===
- Feu et boue, Editions Caractères, Paris 1983
- L’instant des nœuds, Editions Saint-Germain-des-Prés, Paris 1984
- Méandres, Editions du Guichet, Paris 1985
- Horizon, vertige & italie intercalaire, Editions Arcam, Paris 1986 (Prix Rutebeuf)
- Ex-odes, Editions PHI, Luxembourg 1991
- Ouvert fermé, Editions PHI/L’Orange Bleue 1994
- Effaçonner, poèmes. Editions PHI/Ecrits des Forges. Luxembourg/Québec 1996
- Point. Poèmes. Editions PHI/L’Orange Bleue 1999.
- La morte del padre. En plein edizioni. Milan 1999
- La pluie comme un œil. Poèmes. Editions Empreintes, Lausanne 2001
- L’étrange langue. Poèmes. Editions Le Taillis Pré, Namur 2002 (Prix Mallarmé)
- L’arbre de la disparition, poèmes, Editions PHI/Ecrits des Forges, Luxembourg/Québec 2004
- La cendre des mots. Anthologie personnelle. Editions Le Castor Astral, Paris. Juin 2005.
- Le travail du poumon, Editions Le Castor Astral, Paris, mars 2007.
- Je veux dire, poème, Editions Estuaires, Luxembourg, novembre 2007
- En réalité, poème, Editions PHI, Luxembourg, juin 2008
- La réinvention de l'oubli, Editions Le Castor Astral, Paris, juin 2010
- Conceptions, Editions PHI, Luxembourg, juin 2012
- Après le tremblement, Editions Le Castor Astral, Paris, mai 2013
- La Tristesse Cosmique, Editions PHI, Paris, 2017.

=== Theatre ===
- Le mariage de Pythagore, Teatro Vivace, Luxembourg 1995
- Destin Destination. Théâtre. Editions PHI, Luxembourg 1998
- Hexaméron. Dernier jour, suivi de Orphée au pays des mortels. Editions PHI, Luxembourg 2011

=== Essays ===
- Allen Ginsberg. L’autre Amérique. Essai. Le Castor Astral, Paris, 1999.
- Anthologie luxembourgeoise. Poésie. Ecrits des Forges, Trois-Rivières 1999
- Journal croisé d'un tremblement de terre, Convivium, Luxembourg 2010

=== Books with artists (selection) ===
- Promenade nocturne dans l’étang en fleur. Poèmes. Avec le peintre Paul di Felice et le compositeur Roland Kaber. Editions Kulturfabrik, Luxembourg 1984
- Point dappui. Poèmes. Avec le peintre Scanreigh. Café des attributions, éditeur. Eymoutiers, 1999
- Point de suspension. Poèmes. Avec le peintre Marek Sczcesny. Editions PHI, Luxembourg, 1999
- L’olive provisoire, poèmes, avec la peintre Anne Slacik. Editions Trans-Signum, Paris mars 2004
- Rue du Nord, poèmes, avec la peintre Yarmilla Vesovic, Editions l’Eventail, Tours mars 2004
- La hache du pourquoi, poèmes avec Anne Slacik, Paris mai 2004
- Le charbon descend, poèmes, avec Anne Slacik, Ed. Lucien Schweitzer, juillet 2004
- Tous les feux sont éteints, poèmes, avec la peintre roumaine Augusta de Schucani. Éditions ICI & AILLEURS, Paris décembre 2004.
- L’histoire est finie, poèmes avec le peintre luxembourgeois Jean-Marie Biwer, Ed. Red Fox, Irlande, mars 2005
- Puisque je fouille dans les mots humides, avec la peintre française Anne Slacik. Éditions Brèche, Alain-Lucien Benoît, Rochefort du Gard, France, avril 2005
- Les amants/le souffle, avec la peintre Génia Golendorf. Editions TransSignum, Paris, mars 2006.
- Le partage des (p)eaux, avec la peintre Wanda Miluheac. Editions TransSignum, Paris, 2008.
- Ce qui advient et ce qui n'advient pas, avec le peintre Robert Brandy, Redfox Press, Irlande, 2010
- Le fabricant d’âmes, avec le peintre Bob Verschuuren, Editions Galerie Lucien Schweitzer, Luxembourg, janvier 2013

Translations (selection) La dernière traversée de la Manche, de Pierre Joris. Poèmes. Editions PHI, Luxembourg 1995 – Hiver clinique, de Ioana Craciunescu. Poèmes. Editions PHI, Luxembourg 1996 – L’épiphanie de l’alphabet, de Maria Luisa Spaziani, Editions PHI. Poèmes Luxembourg 1997 – La cathédrale en flammes, de Guy Rewenig. Roman. Editions du Castor Astral. Paris 1997 – Obscur ouvert, de Juan Gelman. Editions PHI. Poèmes. Luxembourg 1997 – Christ avec renard urbain, de John F. Deane, Editions PHI. Poèmes. Luxembourg 1999 – Poèmes quotidiens, de Esteban S. Cobas. Editions Indigo, Paris 1999 – La nuit avant de monter à bord, de Daniel Samoilovitch. Editions PHI. Poèmes. Luxembourg 2001 – Salaires de l’impie et autres poèmes, de Juan Gelman. Editions PHI. Poèmes. Luxembourg 2002 – Un nirvana cruel, de Jerome Rotheberg. Editions PHI. Poèmes. Luxembourg 2002 – L’illuminé, de Gonzalo Rojas. Editions Myriam Solal. Poèmes. Paris 2003 – Par dessus l’épaule du poème, de Milan Richter, traduction collective, dans le cadre des ateliers de traduction de la poésie contemporaine de l’IPW. Editions PHI, Luxembourg, 2005. – Travaux en vert, de Simona Popescu, traduction collective, dans le cadre des ateliers de traduction de la poésie contemporaine de l’IPW. Editions PHI, Luxembourg, 2007. – Hagen interroge Siegfried sur les oiseaux, de Hans D. Gräf, Editions Alidades, Paris, 2010 – Maria Mariosh, de Reina Maria Rodriguez. Ed. Horizontes insulares, Canaries, 2010 – Espace où tout est bord, de Aléxis Gómez Rosa, Ed, Horizontes Insulares, Canaries, 2010 – Une étrange odeur de monde, de Víctor Rodríguez Nuñez, Editions L'Oreille du loup, Paris, 2011 – L'Amant mondial, de Juan Gelman, Editions Caractères, Paris, 2012 – Pologne/1931 de Jerome Rothenberg, Editions Caractères, Paris, 2013 – Blues en seize, de Stefano Benni, Editions PHI, Luxembourg, 2013

CD: (selection) CD (and vidéo) Peauéphoné, musique de Jean-Louis Dhermy à partir du texte de Jean Portante : le partage des peaux CD La Strana lingua. Roberto Carosone canta Jean Portante
