= Roger Manderscheid =

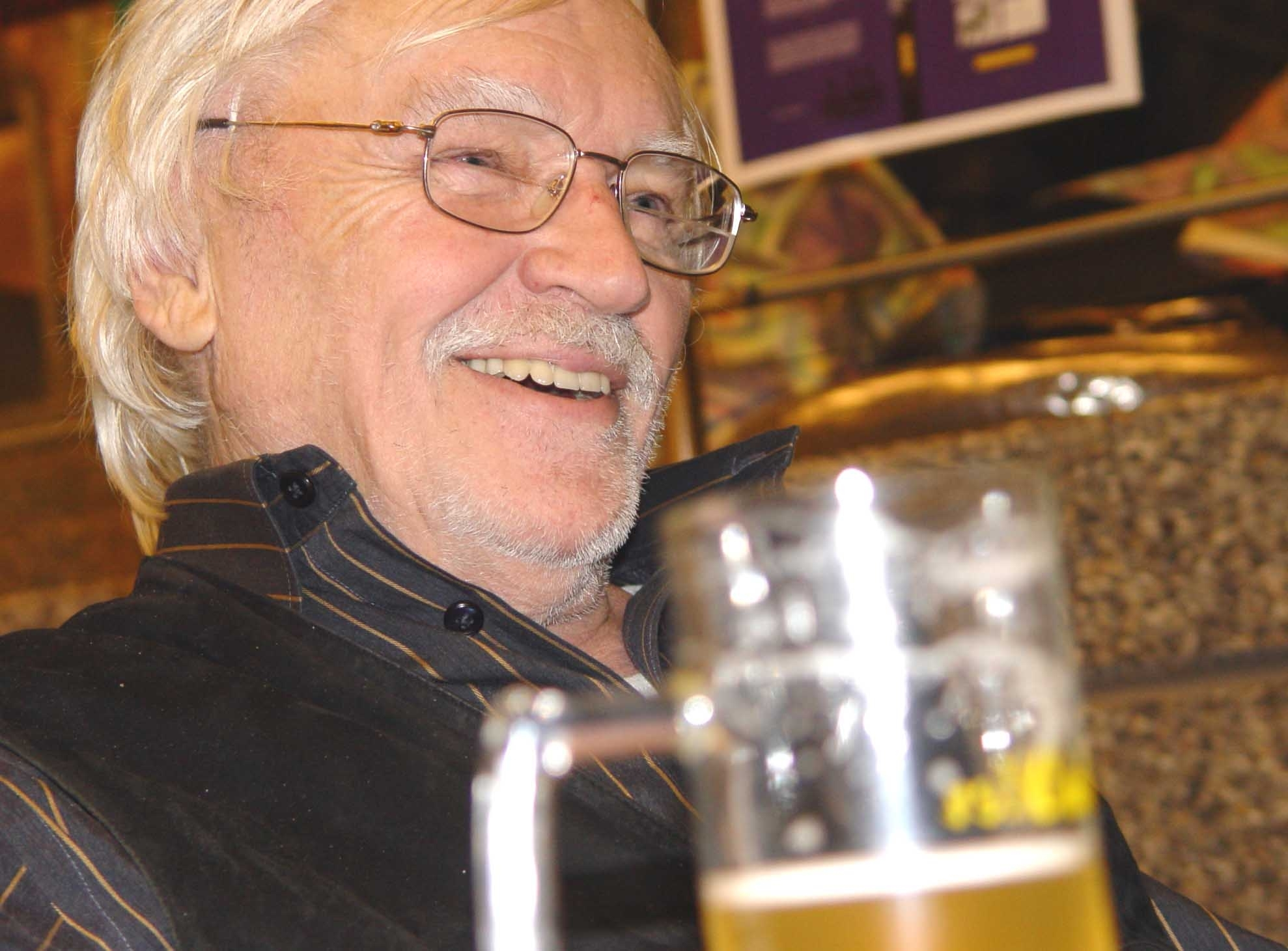
Roger Manderscheid, November 2004

Roger Manderscheid (1 March 1933, in Itzig – 1 June 2010) was a writer from Luxembourg. He won the Batty Weber Prize in 1990 for his literary work and the inaugural Servais Prize in 1992 for De Papagei um Käschtebam.
