= Anise Koltz =

Luxembourgish writer (1928–2023)

Anise Koltz

Anise Koltz (12 June 1928 – 1 March 2023) was a Luxembourgish contemporary author. Best known for her poetry and her translations of poems, she also wrote a number of children's stories. In 1962, she was a cofounder with Nic Weber of the successful literary conference series Journées littéraires de Mondorf (now Académie Européenne de Poésie) in which she has always played a key role.

== Biography ==
Born on 12 June 1928 in Eich, Luxembourg City, Koltz began to write fairy stories in the 1950s mainly in German and Luxembourgish. She also worked as a translator. Many of her works have been translated into English, Spanish and Italian. She was considered to be Luxembourg's most important contemporary poet.

From 1963, the Journées littéraires de Mondorf (Mondorf Literary Days) created links between Luxembourg writers and the international scene. In 1995, the Mondorf Literary Days were revived, representing all literary genres so as to provide a wide range of authors with a platform for their works.

Koltz died on 1 March 2023, at the age of 94.

== Awards ==
- 1992 – Prix Jean Malrieu
- 1992 – Prix Blaise Cendrars
- 1994 – Antonio Viccaro prize for "Chants de refus"
- 1996 – Batty Weber Prize
- 1997 – Rheinlandtaler prize from "Landschaftsverband Rheinland"
- 1998 – Prix Guillaume Apollinaire for Le mur du son
- 2005 – Jan Smrek Prize in Slovakia – for her lifelong work
- 2008 – Servais Prize for L'ailleurs des mots
- 2009 – Prix de littérature francophone Jean Arp for "La lune noircie"

== Works ==
=== In German ===
- Märchen, Luxembourg, 1957
- Heimatlos, Gedichte, Luxembourg, 1959
- Der Wolkenschimmel und andere Erzählungen, Luxembourg, 1960
- Spuren nach innen, 21 Gedichte, Luxembourg, 1960
- Steine und Vögel, Gedichte, München/Esslingen, 1964
- Den Tag vergraben, Bechtle Verlag, 1969
- Fragmente aus Babylon, Delp Verlag, 1973

=== Bilingual German and French ===
- Le cirque du soleil, Pierre Seghers, 1966
- Vienne quelqu'un, Rencontre, 1970
- Fragments de Babylone, Fagne, 1974
- Sich der Stille hingeben, Heiderhoff Verlag, 1983

=== In French ===
- Le jour inventé, Paris, 1975
- La terre monte, Belfond, Paris, 1980
- Souffles sculptés, Guy Binsfeld, 1988
- Chants de refus I and II, phi, 1993 and 1995
- Le mur du son, phi, 1997, Prix Guillaume Apollinaire
- Le paradis brûle, La Différence, 1998
- La terre se tait, phi, 1999
- Le cri de l'épervier, phi, 2000
- Le porteur d'ombre, phi, 2001
- L'avaleur de feu, phi, 2003
- Béni soit le serpent, phi, 2004
- L'ailleurs des mots, Éditions Arfuyen, 2007, Prix Jean Servais
- La Lune noircie, Éditions Arfuyen, 2009 in connection with Prix de littérature francophone Jean Arp
- La Muraille de l'Alphabet, phi, 2010]
- Je renaîtrai, Éditions Arfuyen, 2011

=== Bilingual French and English ===
- At the Devil's Banquets, Dedalus Press, 1998. ISBN 978-1-901233-05-6
- At the Edge of Night, Arc Publications, 2009. ISBN 978-1-904614-56-2

== Bibliography ==
- Forderer, Manfred (1971). Anfang und Ende der abendländischen Lyrik (in German). Amsterdam: John Benjamins Publishing. ISBN 978-90-6032-412-7.
- Brucher, Roger: "Anise Koltz, de traces et d'aigle", Virton: La Dryade. 1976.
- Weins, Alain (1999). "Kann Poesie die Welt verändern?" (in German). Echternach: Editions Phi : Centre national de littérature. ISBN 978-3-88865-173-1.
- Caldognetto, Maria Luisa: "Anise Koltz: 'Il paradiso brucia'", in: Poesia. Milano: Crocetti. n° 153. (September 2001). pp. 32–43.
