= Guy Rewenig =

Luxembourgish author (born 1947)

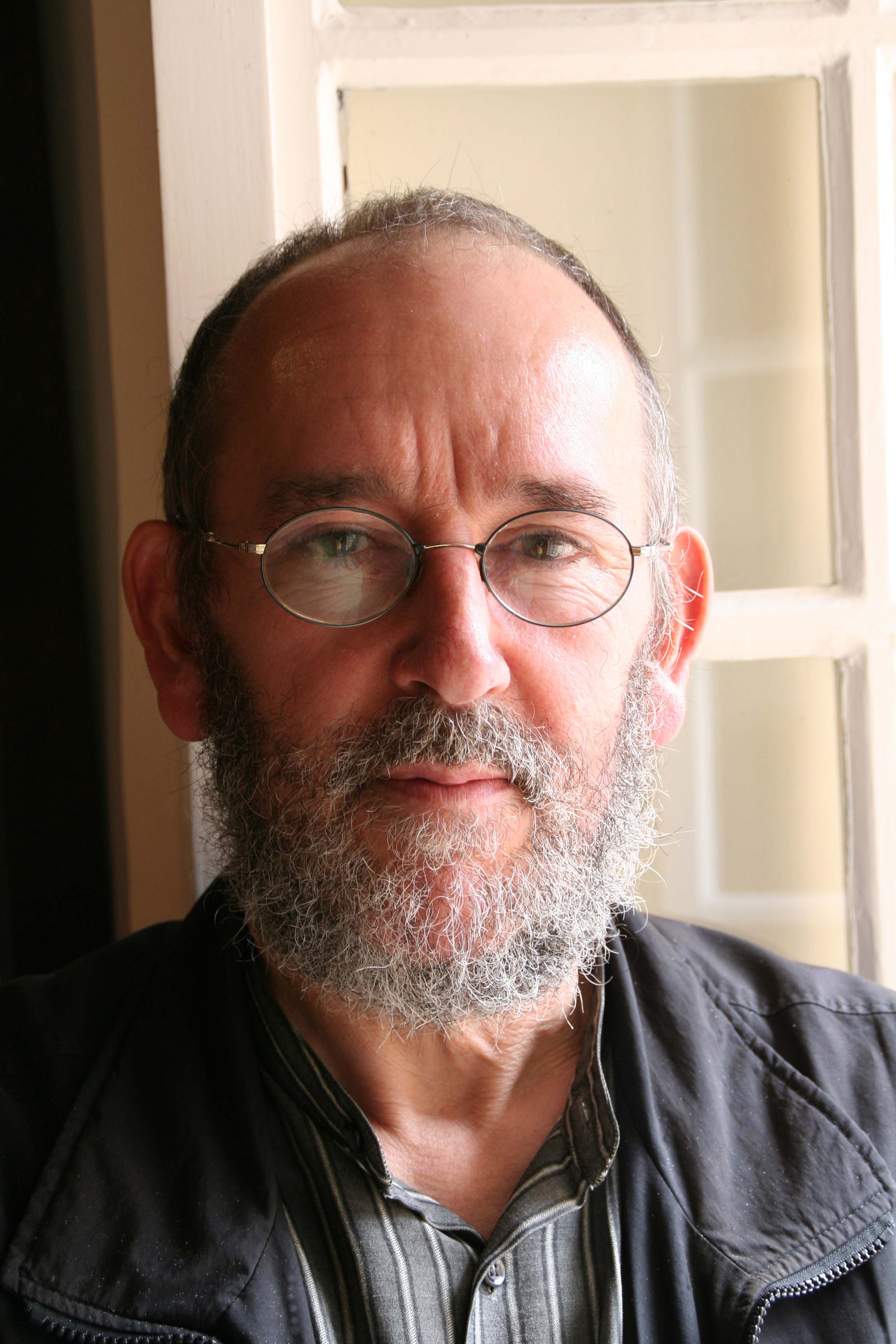
Rewenig in 2007

Guy Rewenig (born 31 August 1947) is a Luxembourgish author and novelist. In 1984, he wrote the first novel in the Luxembourgish language although poems and theatrical works had appeared in the 19th century. Together with Roger Manderscheid, he is credited for initiating the current trend for novels written in Luxembourgish.

== Biography ==
Born on 31 August 1947 in Luxembourg City, Rewenig completed his secondary school education at the Athénée de Luxembourg before being trained as a schoolteacher at the Institut pédagogique. He taught first in the primary school at Bettembourg and from 1971 in Esch-sur-Alzette. In 1984, he gave up teaching to become a full-time independent writer and moved to Nospelt.

== Career as a writer ==
In 1963, Rewenig published his first film reviews in the Luxemburger Wort. His first play "Interview" appeared in 1970 as did Als der Feigenbaum verdorrte, a collection of essays. From 1973, he also began to write for children, his highly successful collection of children's stories Muschkilusch. Geschichte fir Kanner appearing in 1990. In 1985, Guy Rewenig published Hannert dem Atlantik, the very first novel to appear in Luxembourgish, paving the way for other works of fiction to be written in the local language. Rewenig writes in German, Luxembourgish and French. His novel Roman Mass mat dräi Hären was translated into French by Jean Portante as La cathédrale en flammes. He has also written many satirical works criticizing the social and political shortcomings of Luxembourg life and has frequently contributed articles to Luxembourg newspapers and periodicals.

In 1974, he was a founding member of the Association de soutien aux travailleurs immigrés and in 2000, together with Roger Manderschied, he founded the publishing house Ultimomondo where his works now appear. In 2010, he published the novel Sibiresch Eisebunn under the penname Tania Naskandy.

== Awards ==
Rewenig has received many awards in Luxembourg including the first prize for the Concours littéraire national in 1984, 1988 and 1991; the Batty Weber Prize in 2005; and the Prix Servais in 2006 and 2010.

== Published works ==
- Guy Rewenig (1990). Muschkilusch: Geschichte fir Kanner. Op der Lay Editions, Esch/Sauer ISBN 978-2-919933-30-3
- Guy Rewenig (1992). Zebra Tscherri: Geschichte fir Kanner. Éditions Phi, Echternach ISBN 978-2-919933-31-0
- Guy Rewenig (1996). Packatuffi Frisange
- Guy Rewenig (1997). Zabbazillo: Reimgeschichte fir Kanner. Éditions Phi ISBN 978-3888651533
- Guy Rewenig (2005). Der Hoflieferant. Éditions PhiISBN 3-88865-121-2
- Guy Rewenig (2010). Comment blanchir les bêtes noires sans les faire rougir. Éditions PhiISBN 978-99959-42-16-8
- Guy Rewenig (2022). Schnatt. Éditions Guy Binsfeld ISBN 978-99959-42-90-8
