= Lycée de Garçons de Luxembourg =

Lycée de garçons de Luxembourg
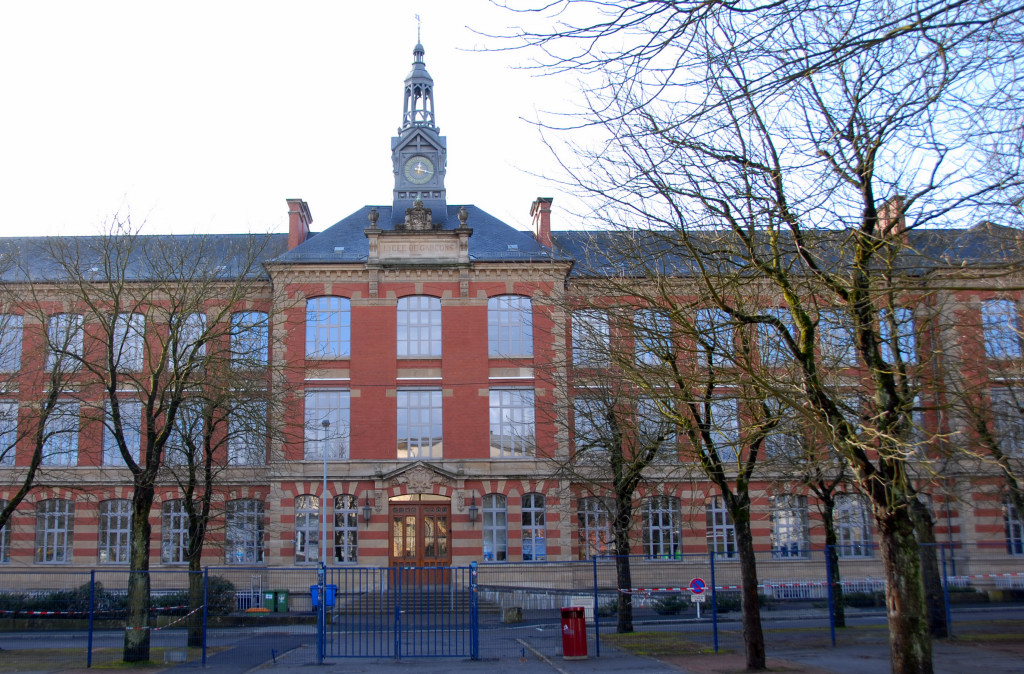

Location
- Luxembourg City; Luxembourg
- 49°37′11″N 06°07′17″E

Information
- Type: Classical middle school
- Established: 1892
- Staff: 109
- Grades: 1ère diploma equivalent to A-Levels
- Enrollment: 1025
- Campus type: Limpertsberg
- Website: http://www.lgl.lu

The Lycée de Garçons de Luxembourg (English: Luxembourg Boys' High School; LGL) is a high school in Luxembourg City, in southern Luxembourg. The Lycée is located in the Limpertsberg district, in the north-west of the city and is currently considered to be among the top secondary institutions in Luxembourg. Today, it is a mixed school, as female students have been allowed since the 1960s.

The origins of the Lycée de Garçons go back to the first half of the 19th century, when Luxembourg saw the birth of industry and financial institutions alongside agriculture and craftsmanship. The Athénée de Luxembourg's main mission being to train the country's intellectual elite on the basis of an education that was above all humanistic, there was a need to give life to a school that could train engineers and accountants.

Thus, the law of 23 July 1848 on higher and middle education created within the Athénée "an industrial school open to young people destined for the arts, industry and commerce". The Gymnasium continued to provide humanistic education based on the learning of ancient languages.

The Athénée thus housed two schools within its walls until the adoption of the law of 28 March 1892, which separated the Industrial School from the Gymnasium and placed it under special management. This was the birth of the "Ecole commerciale et industrielle", ancestor of the Lycée de Garçons de Luxembourg.

The two schools were initially housed under the same roof in the former Jesuit college adjacent to Notre-Dame Cathedral. This promiscuity, which was conducive to conflicts between the principals and students of the two schools, would not end until September 1908 with the inauguration of the red brick building on the Place Auguste Laurent designed by the architect Gustave Serta. It is this same building that still houses the Lycée de Garçons nowadays.

German troops occupied the building in August 1914, but left before the start of the school year. The German occupation had less impact on school life than on freedom of expression. Pupils and their teachers had to refrain from any political discussion and from any action that could be considered provocative by the occupying forces.

The inter-war period was conducive to the development of science departments. Since students attending the "Cours supérieurs" science section were following the same course as the students of the Industrial and Commercial School's "Première Industrielle", laboratories were set up and equipped. The science departments took advantage of this opportunity to enrich their collections. Many of them are now part of the collection of old scientific instruments displayed at the LGL.

In 1940, as part of the policy of "germanization" of the country, the Nazi occupier began to dismantle the Industrial and Commercial School and replace it with a "Gymnasium"-type high school. Thus, two institutions were set up within the same building: the "Staatliche Limpertsberg-Oberschule für Jungen" and the "Goethe-Schule", a German-type school in its organization and in terms of the subjects taught. At the high school, a climate of terror was created among the students and teachers. Teachers were obliged to participate in compulsory indoctrination courses in Germany and students were encouraged to enroll in the "Hitlerjugend", otherwise they would be expelled. Recalcitrant teachers were dismissed and replaced. From September 1942 onwards, many pupils were forcibly enlisted in the Wehrmacht. Most of them found themselves on the Russian front. Some would never see their country again. The Industrial and Commercial School thus paid a heavy price during the Second World War.

Since 1945, the LGL, in addition to the traditional sections, has housed gymnasium classes identical to those of the Athénée. The school, renamed "Lycée de Garçons de Luxembourg", now provides secondary education leading to a diploma that opens its baccalaureates the doors to any university worldwide.

By the law of 10 May 1968 introducing coeducation in the Grand Duchy, the LGL ceased to be a high school for boys only but still preserves the name.

== Notable alumni ==
- Jules Hoffmann, biologist, Nobel Prize 2011
- Vicky Krieps, actress
