= List of Luxembourgish women writers =

This is a list of women writers who were born in Luxembourg or whose writings are closely associated with that country.

- Anne Beffort (1880–1966), educator, literary scholar and writer, supported French culture in Luxembourg
- Carole Dieschbourg (born 1977), politician and non-fiction writer
- Anise Koltz (1928–2023), prominent poet writing mainly in French and German
- José Ensch (1942–2008), poet, wrote in French
- Anne Faber (graduated 2006), journalist, chef, cookbook writer, television personality
- Germaine Goetzinger (born 1947), writer, historian, educator and feminist
- Josiane Kartheiser (born 1950), journalist, novelist, children's writer, German and Luxembourgish
- Anna Leader (born 1996), poet, novelist, writing in English
- Marianne Majerus (born 1956), photographer, writer, specializing in works on gardens, writing in English, French and German
- Claudine Muno (born 1979), novelist, children's writer, playwright, writing in English, French, German and Luxembourgish
- Monique Philippart (born 1955), children's writer, writing in German
- Nathalie Ronvaux (born 1977), poet, playwright
- Germaine Simon (1921–2012), novelist, short story writer
- Margret Steckel (born 1934), German-born Luxembourg novelist, columnist, translator, writing in German
- Marie Henriette Steil (1898–1930), short story writer
- Ketty Thull (1905–1987), cook, educator, cookbook writer
- Lily Unden (1908–1989), poet and painter
- Nora Wagener (born 1989), short story writer, novelist, playwright, children's writer, writing mainly in German

== See also ==
- List of women writers
