= Lex Jacoby =

Luxembourgish writer

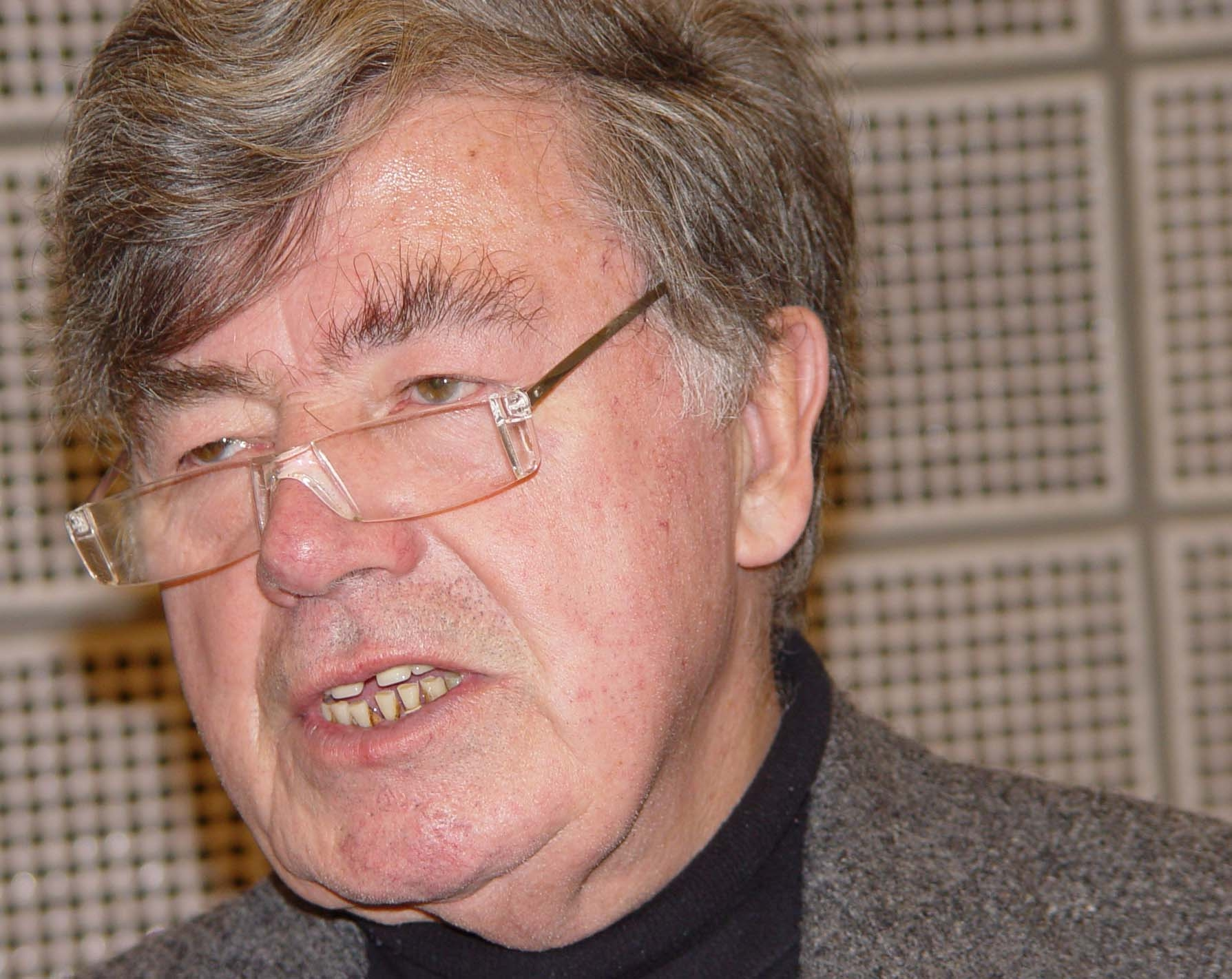

Alex 'Lex' Jacoby (28 February 1930 – 20 November 2015) was a Luxembourgish writer. He wrote novels, poems, plays and newspaper articles. He was born in Junglinster. His early works were written in the French language, Later Jacoby dedicated himself to writing exclusively in German. Before pursuing writing full-time, Jacoby was a teacher in Clervaux.

== Works ==
- Die Sehnsucht des Schamanen (1952)
- Der Fremde (1954)
- Le Pavot Blanc (1963)
- Luxemburg (1963)
- Der Grenzstein (1963)
- Nachts gehen die Fische an Land (1980)
- Das Logbuch der Arche (1988)
- Der fromme Staub der Feldwege (1990)
- Spanien heiter bis wolkig (1994)
- Wasserzeichen (1995)
- Remis in der Provence (2000)
- Wie nicht ganz schwarzer Kohlenstein (2001)
- Die Deponie (2006)

Awards
Preceded by Joseph Kohnen	Servais Prize; 1996	Succeeded by Margret Steckel
