= Pol Schmoetten =

Luxembourgish writer (born 1958)

Pol Schmoetten (born 17 May 1958 in Dudelange) is a Luxembourgish writer. He won the Servais Prize in 2000 for his book Der Tag des Igels.
