= Josy Rongoni =

Luxembourgish footballer (1932–2019)

Personal information
- Date of birth: 18 December 1932
- Date of death: 17 December 2019 (aged 86)
- Place of death: Dudelange, Luxembourg

International career
Years	Team	Apps	(Gls)
1956–1957	Luxembourg	2	(0)

Josy Rongoni (18 December 1932 – 17 December 2019) was a Luxembourgish footballer. He played in two matches for the Luxembourg national football team from 1956 to 1957. Rongoni died in Dudelange on 17 December 2019, at the age of 86.
