= Germaine Goetzinger =

Luxembourgish writer, historian and feminist

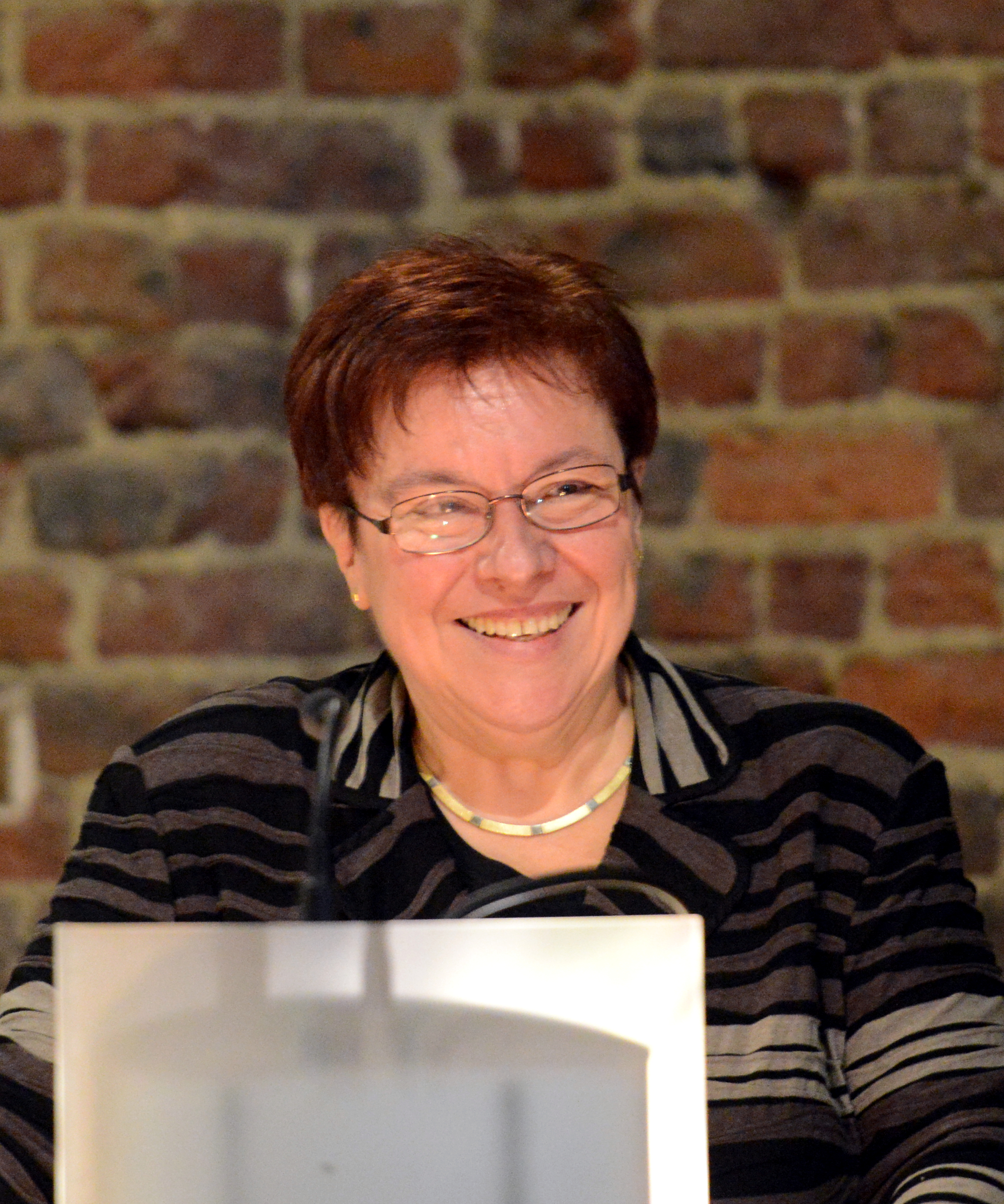
- Goetzinger in 2013
- Born: 5 May 1947 (age 79); Dudelange, Luxembourg
- Education: University of Tübingen
- Occupation: Historian
- Writing career
- Subjects: Feminism; biography

Germaine Goetzinger (born 5 May 1947) is a Luxembourgish writer, historian, educator and feminist. From 1995 to 2012, she headed Luxembourg's National Literature Centre. In 2011, she was awarded the Lëtzebuerger Bicherpräis (Luxembourg Book Prize) for fostering collaboration in literary circles and for her outstanding contribution to documentary and analytical research into Luxembourg's literature.

== Biography ==
Born in Dudelange, Luxembourg, Germaine Goetzinger matriculated from the Lycée de jeunes filles at Esch-sur-Alzette in 1966. After teacher training in Walferdange, she studied German literature and history at the University of Tübingen, graduating in 1973. From 1976 to 1995, she taught in three of Luxembourg's lycées, after which she lectured on new German literature at the Centre universitaire de Luxembourg.

From 1995 to 2012, she headed the newly established National Literature Centre where she organized many exhibitions, promoted Luxembourg's authors and collaborated in a wide range of literary and cultural circles. She was a member of the Fonds culturel national (1998-2013) and headed the Union des germanistes (1999-2004). Since 2012, she has presided the Fondation Servais which awards an annual literary prize.

Goetzinger has published the results of her research into German and Luxembourg literature in scientific and journals and in literary reviews. She has also published works on feminism, including a biography of the German author Luise Aston. Other feminists which she has studied include the Luxembourg women's rights campaigner Aline Mayrisch and the writers Emma Weber-Brugmann, Marie Henriette Steil, Anise Koltz, and Anna Speyer, all of whom played an important role in Luxembourg's literary heritage and in the development of the woman's role in society.

In addition to the Luxembourg Book Prize (2011), in 2004 Germaine Goetzinger was awarded the Rheinlandtaler Prize for her contribution to the cultural development of the Rhineland.
