= Pol Greisch =

Luxembourgish actor, dramatist and writer (1930–2026)

Pol Greisch (8 April 1930 – 15 February 2026) was a Luxembourgish actor, dramatist and writer.

== Life and career ==
Greisch was born in Walferdange on 8 April 1930. He won the Servais Prize in 1993 for several plays, including Äddi Charel, Besuch, and E Stéck Streisel and in 2002, he was awarded the Batty Weber Prize for his entire literary work. Greisch died on 15 February 2026, at the age of 95.

== Works ==
=== Plays ===
- Äddi Charel (1966)
- Besuch (1969)
- Ënnerwee (1978)
- Grouss Vakanz (1980)
- Viru mam Jabel (1981)
- Margréitchen (1986)
- E Bucki (1983)
- De laangen Tour (1988)
- E Stéck Streisel (1992)
- Kellerzerwiss (1992)
- E Platten (1995)
- Léiwe Kleeschen (1997)
- Aarme Louder (1998)
- Eng Heemelmaus (1999)
- Wanter (2000)
- Kiischtebléien (2002)
- Fënsterdall (2008)

=== Autobiographical ===
- Fir meng Mamm. Aus engem laange Bréif, 2000

=== Prose ===
- Mäi Frënd Benn, novel, 2004
- D'Sonnesäit
- De Monni aus Amerika. Stories. Ultimomondo, 2012, ISBN 978-2-919933-82-2

=== Other ===
- … an och de Batty-Weber Präis: Kleng Usprooch, 2002, Am: Galerie. – n 3 (2002), S. 351–356
- Lies de bal, together with Cathy Clement, Lucien Blau, Josy Braun, Tullio Forgiarini, Henri Losch, Jhemp Hoscheit, Nico Graf, Roger Manderscheid, Editions Saint-Paul, Editions Guy Binsfeld, 2014

== Filmography ==
=== As actor ===
- Déi zwéi vum Bierg (1985)
- Mumm Sweet Mumm (1989)
- Schacko Klak (1990)
- E Liewe laang (1992)
- Emil (2010)
- Rusty Boys (2017)
- Lupus (2020, short film)
