= Kartheiser =

Kartheiser is a surname. Notable people with the surname include:

- Josiane Kartheiser (born 1950), Luxembourger journalist, novelist, and writer
- Vincent Kartheiser (born 1979), American actor
