= Pol Sax =

Luxembourgish writer living in Berlin (born 1960)

Pol Sax (born 1960) is a Luxembourgish writer living in Berlin whose German-language novel U5 won the Servais Prize for Luxembourg literature in 2009.

== Biography ==
Born on 29 January 1960 at Schifflange in south-eastern Luxembourg, Sax attended primary school in Mondercange, the École professionelle in Esch-sur-Alzette, the Ecole des arts et métiers in Luxembourg City, and the Lycée des garçons in Esch-sur-Alzette. He went on to study German and philosophy at the University of Heidelberg and at the Université libre de Bruxelles.

From 1994 to 1996, Sax was initially employed in restaurants and as an operator in a pasta factory in Heidelberg from 1994 to 1996. He then worked until 1999 as a bartender. Since 2001, he has been living in Berlin, where he works as a freelance writer, contributing reviews of German literature on authors such as Bernhard Schlink and Sven Regener.

== Literature ==
In 2008, Pax made his literary debut with the novel U5, named after the U-Bahn in Berlin, which is the backdrop for a story of complex relationships between three marginalized figures. Artistic creation, living on the fringes of middle-class society, and the emotions such as love, loneliness, and human relationships are central features of the novel which also deals with death and guilt. In 2002, Sax was awarded a literary scholarship by the Förderkreises Deutscher Schriftsteller in Baden-Württemberg.
