= Elise Schmit =

Luxembourgish writer

- Born: 4 February 1982 (age 44); Luxembourg City, Luxembourg
- Education: University of Tübingen
- Occupations: writer and literary critic
- Known for: writes mainly in German
- Notable work: Stürze aus unterschiedlichen Fallhöhen
- Awards: Prix Servais (2019)

Elise Schmit (born 1982) is a Luxembourgish writer and literary critic who writes mainly in German. She has won many awards including the 2019 Prix Servais for Stürze aus unterschiedlichen Fallhöhen, a collection of short stories, which was judged to be the most significant literary work published in Luxembourg in 2018. Schmit has received many awards in Luxembourg, including the first prize for the Concours littéraire national in 2010 and 2012, as well as third prize in 2017; and the Prix Servais in 2019.

== Biography ==
Born in Luxembourg City, Luxembourg on 4 February 1982, Schmit studied German philology and philosophy at the University of Tübingen from 2001 to 2007. She has lived and worked in Luxembourg since 2012. Since 2016 she has co-edited the cultural magazine Les Cahiers luxembourgeois, together with Ian De Toffoli and Marc Limpach. Schmit has written a play for the Théâtre National, which was written in English and developed with British actor Adrian Decosta. The play is set in a world affected by climate change, but is a love story that Schmit describes as "pretty bleak".

== Awards ==
Schmit has received many awards in Luxembourg, including the first prize for the Concours littéraire national in 2010, for Brachland. Roman and in 2012, for Im Zug. In 2017, Schmit was awarded third prize in the Concours littéraire national in the adult authors section, for Stürze aus unterschiedlichen Fallhöhen. In 2022 Schmit was again awarded third prize, for her collection of stories Perfect Spheres – Stories and Complaints.

Schmit won the Prix Servais in 2019.
