= Monique Philippart =

Luxembourgish German-language children's writer

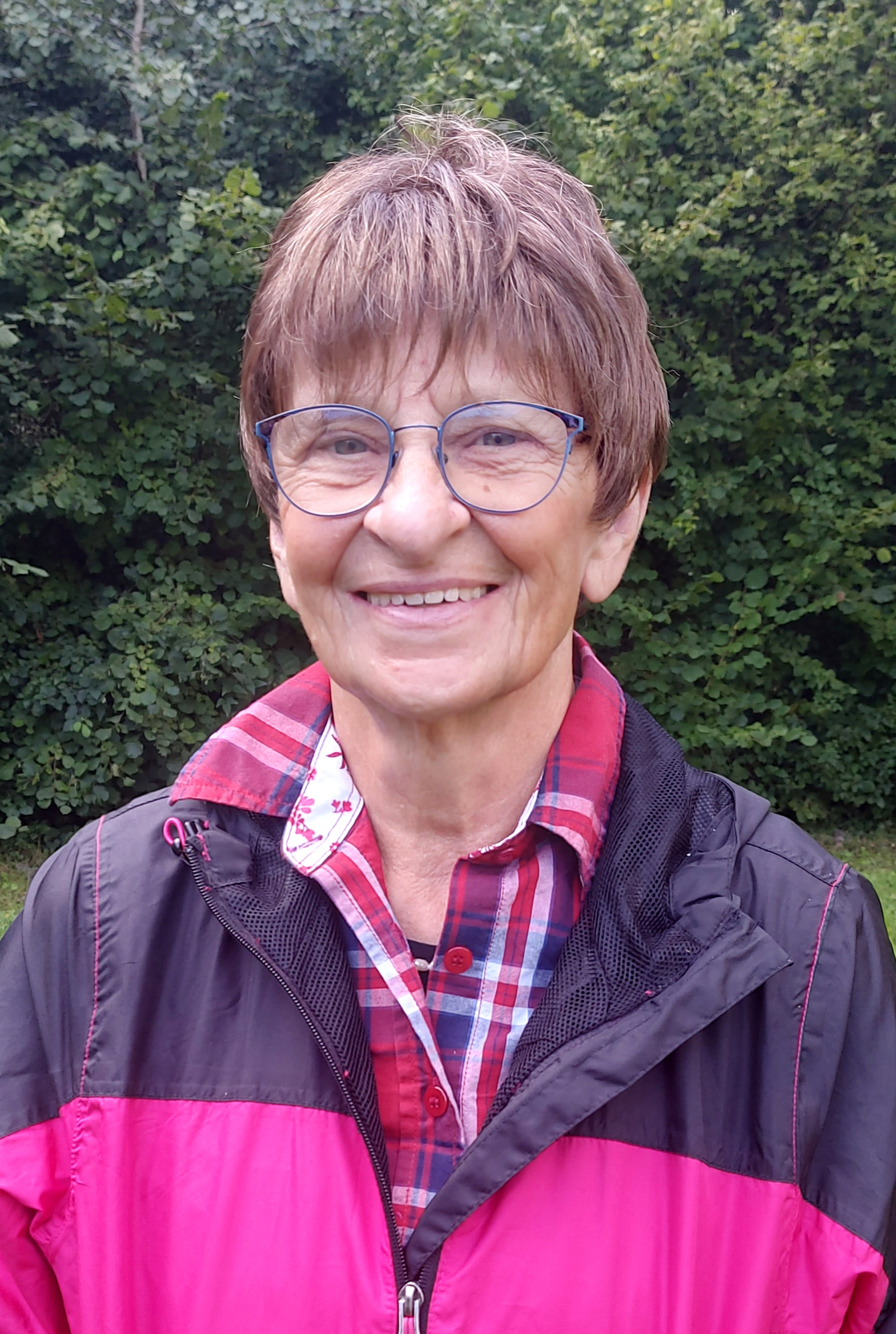
- Born: 1955 (age 70–71)
- Writing career
- Language: Novelist

Monique Philippart née Schmitt (born 1955) is a Luxembourgish children's writer who writes in German. In 2010 she won the Lëtzebuerger Buchpräis (Luxembourg Book Prize) for children and youth literature for her novel Gartenzwerge küsst man nicht (You Don't Kiss Garden Gnomes).

== Biography ==
Born in Esch-sur-Alzette on 15 June 1955, Monique Schmitt matriculated from the Lycée des Jeunes Filles in 1973. For the next three years she looked after children who had hearing impairments before travelling to Brazil where she worked in an SOS children's village in São Paulo (1977–80). After returning to Luxembourg, she took a correspondence course in theology from the University of Würzburg (1984–86). She then taught religion and German in various local primary schools until 2000.

Monique Philippart's literary career is devoted to works for children, often addressing depressions, family conflicts, sickness and drug problems. She received her first award in 1977 for the theatrical sketches she had written for a children's contest organized by Luxembourg's Sparkasse savings bank. In 2001, the jury of the Prix Servais awarded her a mention spéeciale for her novel Laura. In 2010, she won the Lëtzebuerger Buchpräis for children's works.

== Personal life ==
Together with her husband Yves Philippart, she has brought up 11 children, some her own, the others adopted.
