= Budersberg =

Coordinates: 49°30′N 6°04′E

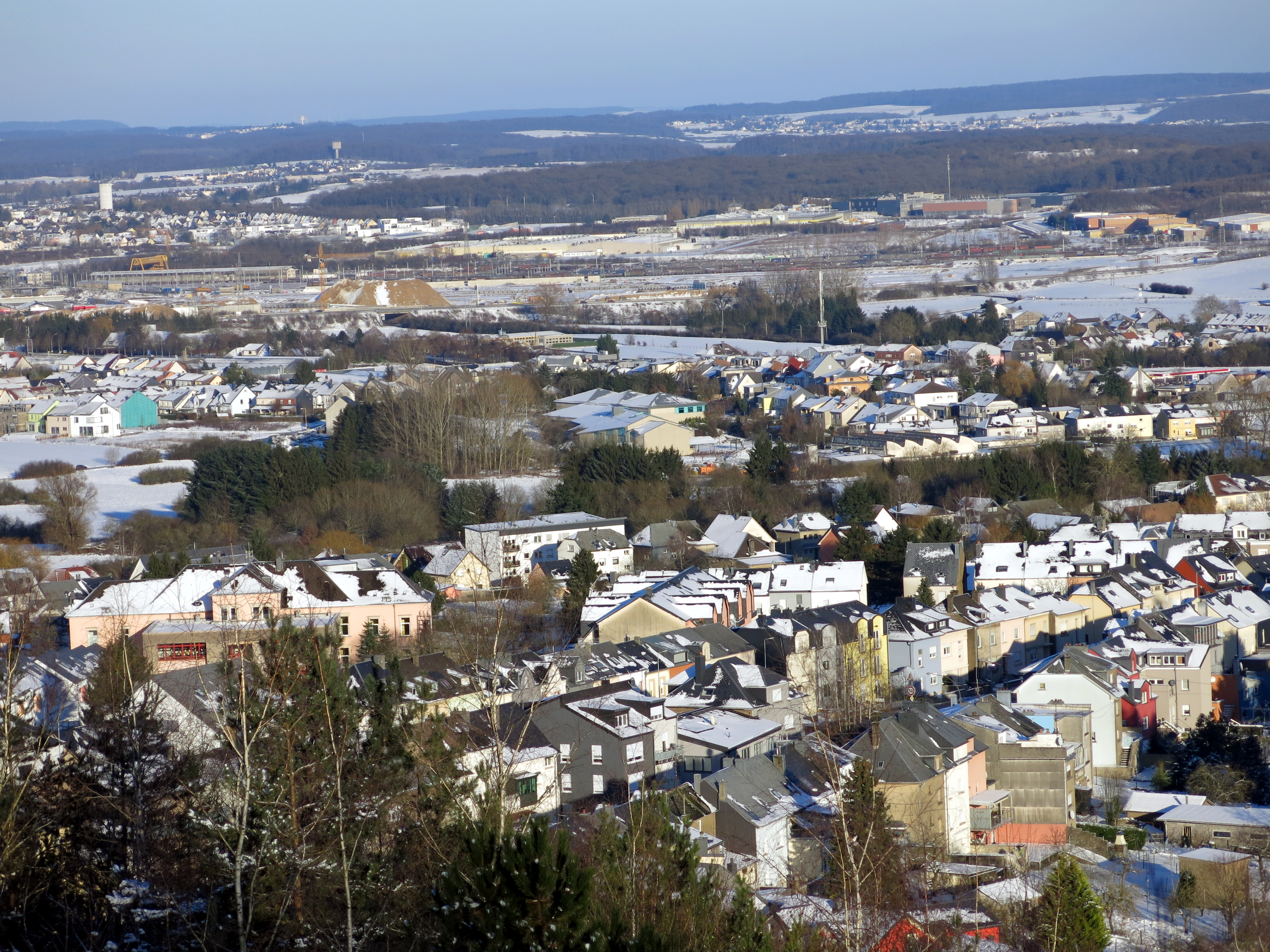
View of Budersberg (December 2014).

Budersberg (German pronunciation: [ˈbuːdɐsbɛʁk]; Luxembourgish: Butschebuerg) is a quarter of Dudelange in southern Luxembourg. As of 2005, the place has a population of 350.
