= José Ensch =

Luxembourgish poet

José Ensch (October 7, 1942 in Luxembourg City – February 4, 2008 in Luxembourg City) was a Luxembourgish poet. She won the Servais Prize in 1998 for her book Dans les cages du vent.

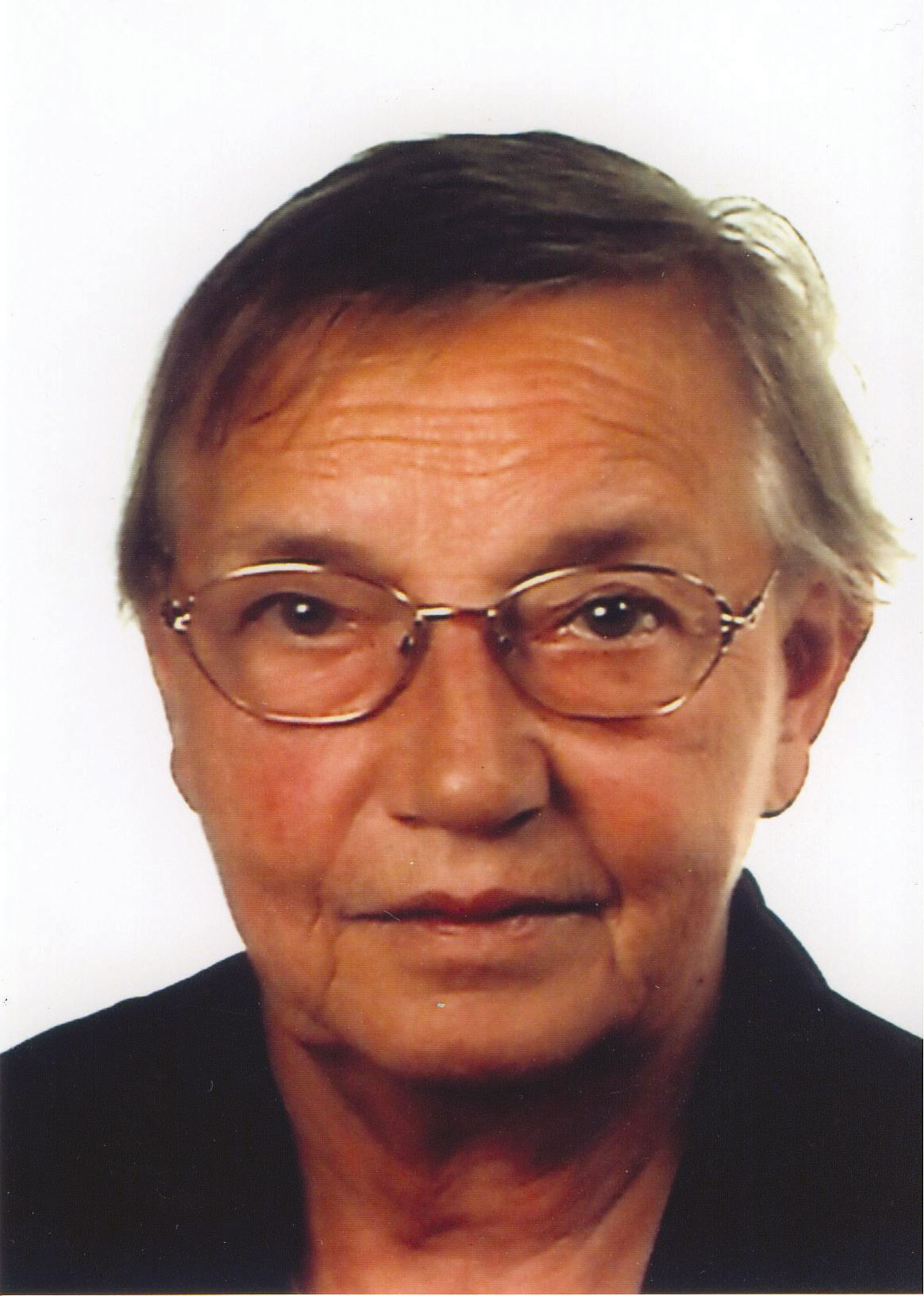
Image of José Ensch, was a Luxembourgish poet.
