= Jhemp Hoscheit =

Luxembourgish writer

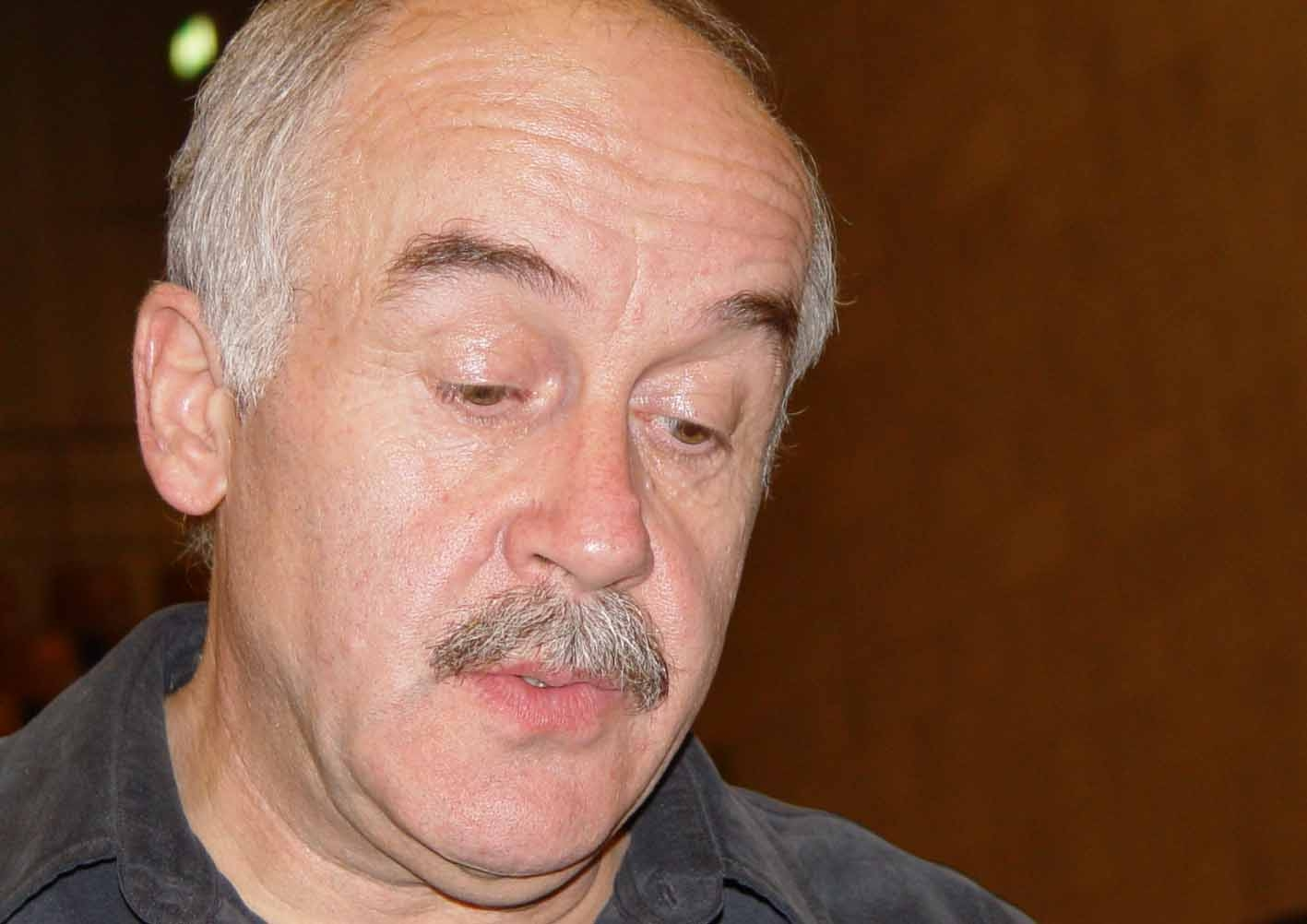
Jhemp Hoscheit

Jean-Pierre Hoscheit, more commonly known as Jhemp Hoscheit (born September 20, 1951, in Esch-sur-Alzette) is a Luxembourgish writer. He won the Servais Prize in 1999 for his book Perl oder Pica.
