= Claudine Muno =

Luxembourgish author and musician

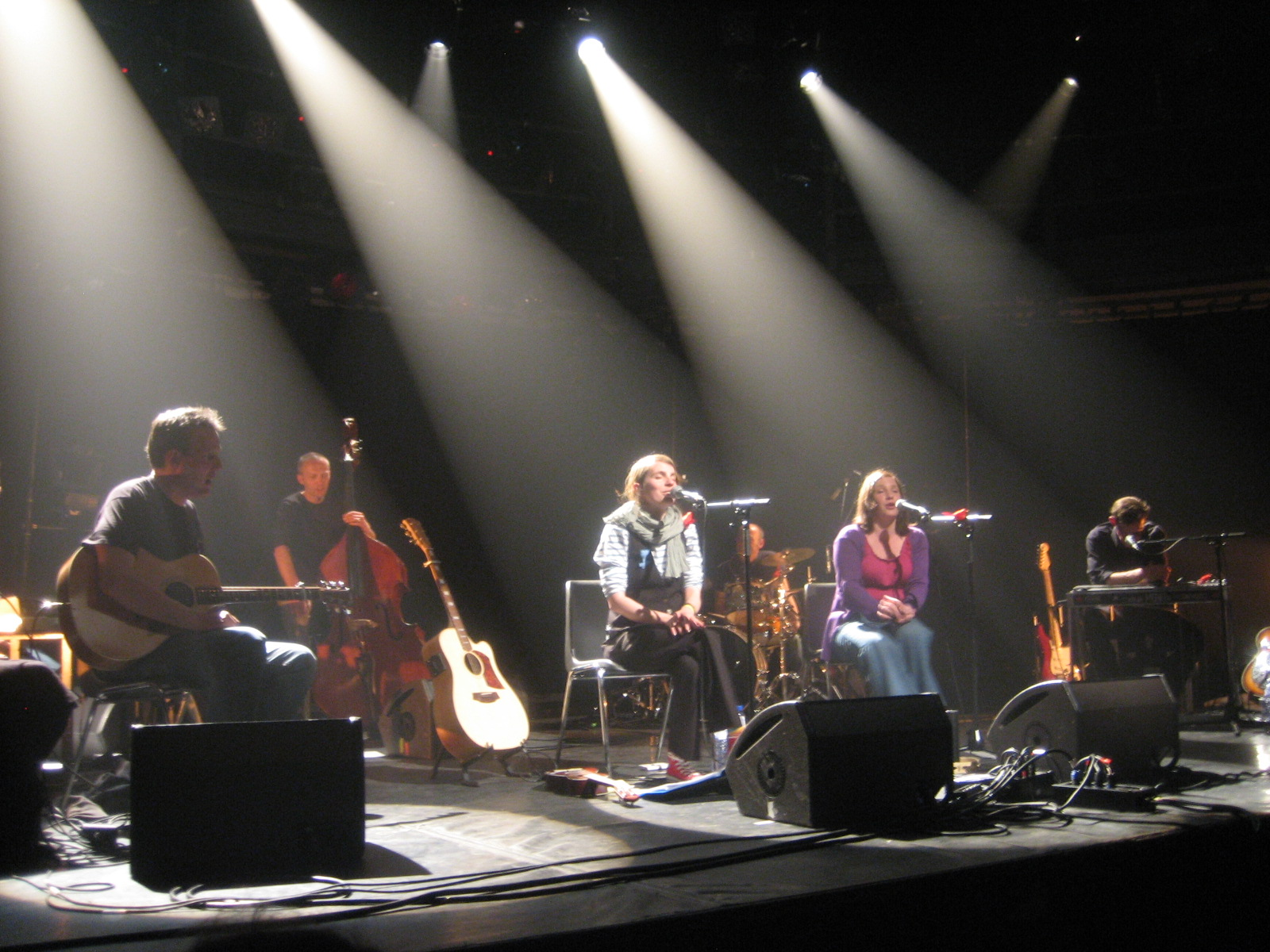
- Muno and The Luna Boots

Background information
- Born: 1979 (age 45–46); Luxembourg City, Luxembourg
- Occupations: Author, singer, musician, music teacher, journalist

Claudine Muno (born 2 July 1979) is a Luxembourgish author, singer, musician, music teacher, and journalist.

== Early life and education ==
Muno spent her childhood in Pétange and finished secondary school with a diploma in modern languages, literature, and Latin. She received an undergraduate degree in history at the University of Strasbourg, France, where she wrote a dissertation on Luxembourgish film: Peur de l'oubli - Peur de l'autre. Les films et documentaires luxembourgeois ayant pour sujet la Deuxième Guerre Mondiale (French: Fear of forgetting, fear of the Other. Luxembourgish films and documentaries covering the Second World War).

== Career ==
After graduating, she became the full-time cultural editor of the Luxembourgish weekly left/green-wing magazine woxx. As of 2007, she has been teaching music in the Neie Lycée, a pilot secondary school in Luxembourg City.

=== Author ===
In 1996, Muno's first publication was a triple surprise for the Luxembourgish book market: the author was not only female (which was rare until then), she was also young (16 years old), and she wrote in English, a language rarely used in Luxembourg literature. In the following years, Muno has published a novel in French, one in German, and three in Luxembourgish. She has also co-authored two children picture storybooks with Pascale Junker who did the illustrations, and she has written two plays in Luxembourgish: Speck and Krakullen. Book critics have compared her writing style to the Belgian writer Amélie Nothomb.

=== Musician ===
Although Muno's first CD was first published by her book publisher, she is nationally and internationally known as Claudine Muno and The Luna Boots, who have already produced two albums.

== Awards ==
- Prix littéraire national 2000 (National Literary Prize) for her short-story Crickets
- Servais Prize (2004) for her novel Frigo

== Bibliography ==
- Muno, Claudine: The Moon of the Big Winds. Esch-sur-Sûre (Luxembourg): Op der Lay, 1996.
- Muno, Claudine: Träume, aus denen man zu spät aufwacht. Esch-sur-Sûre (Luxembourg): Op der Lay, 1997.
- Junker, Pascale & Muno, Claudine: Dem Zoe seng Geschichten. Esch-sur-Sûre (Luxembourg): Op der Lay, 1998.
- Junker, Pascale & Muno, Claudine: D'Zoe, Draachen a Siweschléifer. Dem Zoe seng Geschichten 2. Esch-sur-Sûre (Luxembourg): Op der Lay, 1999.
- Muno, Claudine: 21. Esch-sur-Sûre (Luxembourg): Op der Lay, 1999.
- Muno, Claudine: De Fleeschkinnek. Esch-sur-Sûre (Luxembourg): Op der Lay, 2002.
- Muno, Claudine: Frigo. Esch-sur-Sûre (Luxembourg): Op der Lay. 2003.
- Muno, Claudine: Koma. Esch-sur-Sûre (Luxembourg): Op der Lay, 2005.
- Muno, Claudine: d'welt geet ënner, nils poulet. Esch-sur-Sûre (Luxembourg): Op der Lay, 2006.

== Discography ==
- Muno, Claudine: Fish out of Water. Esch-sur-Sûre (Luxembourg): Op der Lay, 1998.
- Claudine Muno and The Luna Boots: faith + love + death. Maskénada (Luxembourg), 2004.
- Claudine Muno and The Luna Boots: Monsters. Esch-sur-Sûre (Luxembourg): Op der Lay, 1998.
- Claudine Muno and The Luna Boots: Petites chansons méchantes. Green l.f.ant Records, Brussels, 2007.
- Claudine Muno and The Luna Boots: Noctambul. Green l.f.ant Records, Brussels, 2010.
- Claudine Muno and The Luna Boots: Carmagnoles (Compilation). Volvox Music, Moret-sur-Loing (France), 2011.

Awards
Preceded by Jean Sorrente	Servais Prize; 2004	Succeeded by Jean-Paul Jacobs
