= Lily Unden =

Luxembourgish painter

Léonie (Lily) Unden (26 February 1908 – 5 September 1989) was a Luxembourgish poet, painter and educator who was sent to the Ravensbrück concentration camp for taking part in the Luxembourg Resistance during the Second World War. Thanks to her flower paintings, she is remembered as one of Luxembourg's most celebrated female painters.

== Biography ==
Born in Longwy, France, Lily Unden was the daughter of Emile Charles Unden, a Luxembourger, who was a civil engineer in a factory in Longwy-Bas. She returned to Luxembourg with her family just before the First World War, settling in the Muhlenbach quarter of Luxembourg City. After earning her baccalauréat from the École Saint-Joseph, she studied art in Brussels, Paris, Metz and Strasbourg.

Under worked as a painter until the German occupation but as she refused to join the Nazi Volksdeutsche Bewegung, she was assigned to work in a pharmacy. She became a member of the Luxembourg Resistance but was arrested by the Gestapo on 3 November 1942 and eventually sent to the Ravensbrück concentration camp. While she was there, she met the poet Cécile Ries (1911–1985) who encouraged her to write poetry about her concentration camp experiences.

She returned to Luxembourg after being liberated in 1945 and taught at the Lycée de jeunes filles or Girls' High School. In 1947 and 1948, she studied art at New York's Columbia University after which she headed art education at the Lycée de jeunes filles. In 1949, she taught French at the École professionnelle de l'État in Esch-sur-Alzette until she was engaged to teach at the Lycée Robert-Schuman (1966–1973).

As an artist, in addition to her still lifes and landscapes, she illustrated poetry collections, including those of Cécile Ries and Anne Berger (born 1951). As a poet, she is remembered above all for her works inspired by her wartime experiences, especially her humiliating imprisonment at Ravensbrück.

Lily Unden died in Luxembourg City. In 2015, a home for refugees in Limpertsberg was opened as the Foyer Lily Unden.
