= Alexandre Soumet =

French poet (1788–1845)

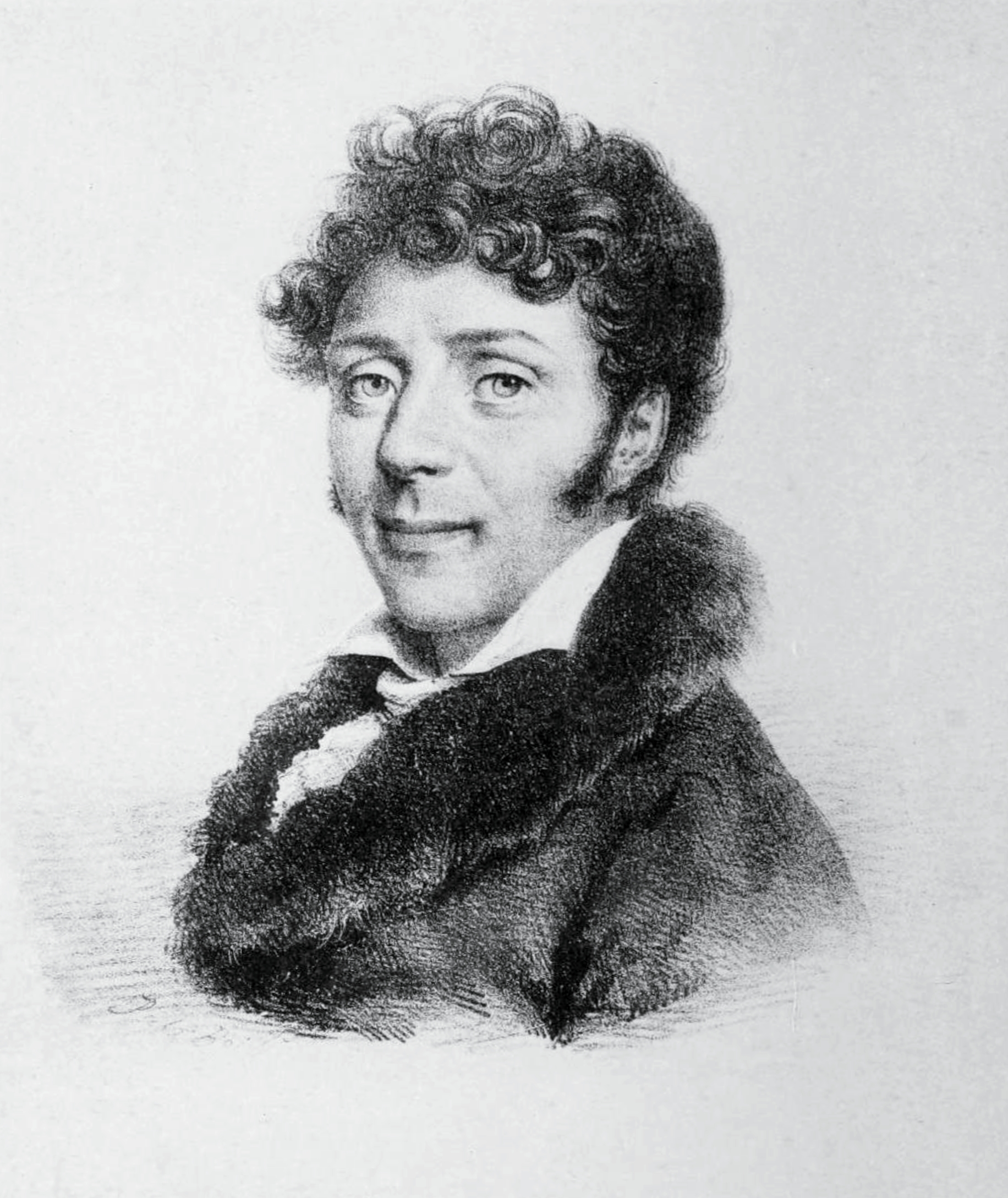
Alexandre Soumet

Alexandre Soumet (French: [sumɛ]; 18 February 1788 – 30 March 1845) was a French poet.

== Biography ==
Alexandre Soumet was born at Castelnaudary, in Languedoc (now département of Aude). His love of poetry began at an early age. He was an admirer of Klopstock and Schiller, then little known in France. Soumet moved to Paris in 1810 and wrote poems in honor of Napoleon that secured his nomination as auditeur of the Conseil d'État. His elegy La pauvre fille appeared in 1814, and two successful tragedies produced in 1822, Clytemnestre and Saül, secured his admission to the Academy in 1824. Jeanne d'Arc (1825) was his most critically acclaimed play. Elisabeth de France (1828) was a weak imitation of Schiller's Don Carlos but Soumet's real bent was towards epic poetry. A poem inspired by Klopstock, La divine épopée, describes the descent of Christ into Hades.

Soumet's Norma, ou L'infanticide (Norma, or The Infanticide) was adapted by Vincenzo Bellini into the well-known opera Norma.

Under Louis XVIII, Soumet became librarian of Saint-Cloud, and subsequently was transferred to Rambouillet and to Compiègne.

He died leaving an unfinished epic on Jeanne d'Arc. His daughter Gabrielle (Mme Beauvain d'Altenheim) collaborated with him in some of his later works.
