= Nathalie Ronvaux =

Luxembourgish French-language poet and playwright

Nathalie Ronvaux (born 1977) is a Luxembourgish poet and playwright who writes in French. For her poetry collection Vignes et louves (Vines and She-wolves) she received the Servais Encouragement Prize in 2011. In 2013 she won first prize in Luxembourg's National Literary Contest for her play La Vérité m'appartient (The Truth Belongs to Me) which was first performed in January 2016.

== Biography ==
Born on 13 June 1977 in Luxembourg City, Nathalie Ronvaux is the daughter of Belgian parents. After primary school in Bertrange, she attended the Lycée Michel Lucius in Luxembourg and the Institut Sainte-Marie in Arlon. She then spend a year studying forensic science in Lausanne before returning to Luxembourg to work for the Chambre des Métiers (2000–08). She took up work in administrative and production management at the Théâtre des Casemates (2008–09) and as production manager for LuxAnimation (2011–12). After spending four years as an administrative coordinator for CEPA (Centre pour la Propagation de l’Art), she decided to devote her time to creative writing.

In 2010, her play Échographie was staged at the Théâtre du Centaure, contributing to a series on "Femmes et violence". The same year she published her poetry collection Vignes et louves, analysing relationships with other people. La liberté meurt chaque jour au bout d’une corde (2012) is a poetic introduction to an exhibition at the National Resistance Museum in Esch-sur-Alzette. In 2014, Ronvaux published a collection of theatrical works including the play La Vérité m’appartient which presents a confrontation between two women who accuse each other of collaborating with the Nazis during the Second World War. After winning first prize at the National Literary Contest, the play was staged in 2016. In 2017, Nathalie Ronvaux was one of ten writers selected for "New Voices from Europe", presenting authors who deserved to be better known.

In addition to her literary awards, in 2015 Ronvaux was named Femme de l'année (Woman of the Year) by the Luxembourg newspaper Le Jeudi.

== References and Bibliography ==
Christina A. Oikonomopoulou: Théâtre francophone: Ecritures théâtrales monde d'expression française, Tome I: Europe, Athènes: éd. Papazissis, 2023, pp. 289–294 et 305–306. (Χριστίνα Α. Οικονομοπούλου: Γαλλόφωνο θέατρο: Σύγχρονες θεατρικές γραφές του κόσμου σε γαλλική γλώσσα, Τόμος Ι: Ευρώπη, Αθήνα: εκδ. Παπαζήση, 2023, σσ. 289-294 και 305–306.)
