= Joseph Kohnen =

Joseph Kohnen (25 October 1940 in Luxembourg City – 2 March 2015) was a writer from Luxembourg. He won the Servais Prize in 1995. He was also a teacher at Athénée de Luxembourg.
