= Nora Wagener =

Luxembourgish writer

- Born: 21 March 1989 (age 37); Luxembourg City
- Citizenship: Luxembourgish
- Education: University of Hildesheim; Institut National des Langues
- Occupations: Novelist, children's writer, playwright
- Awards: Prix Servais

Nora Wagener (born 1989) is a Luxembourgish short story writer, novelist, children's writer and playwright who writes mainly in German. She has won many awards including the 2017 Prix Servais for Larven (Larvae), a collection of short stories, which was judged to be the most significant literary work published in Luxembourg in 2016.

== Biography ==
Born in Luxembourg City on 21 March 1989, she was brought up in Mersch. After matriculating from the Lycée Robert-Schuman in 2008, she studied creative literature and journalism at the University of Hildesheim, Germany, graduating in 2012. The following year, she received a diploma in Luxembourg language and culture from Luxembourg's Institut National des Langues.

In 2011, she published the novel Menschenliebe und Vogel, schrei in which the narrator reflects on life and her own identity while staying with her grandmother. In 2015, she wrote Visions, a play featuring a depressed woman, which was presented in Esch-sur-Alzette under the direction of Claire Thill. The same year she published E. Galaxien with short stories about Erwin, Edgar and Eleonore whose lives develop in different environments.

In 2016, after collaborating with fellow writer Luc Caregari on the children's story d’Glühschwéngchen in Luxembourgish, she published Larven, a collection of 16 romantic short stories. The book earned her the Prix Servais but also the Prix Coup de coeur, under the Lëtzebuerger Bircerhpräis.

Wagener appeared at the 6th EU-China International Literary Festival in a panel discussion with Marie Gamillscheg from Austria and Lu Min from China. Wagener described herself as obsessed with people, "Humans are the most fascinating thing in the world. I´m a huge fan, so to speak".
