= Josiane Kartheiser =

Luxembourg writer

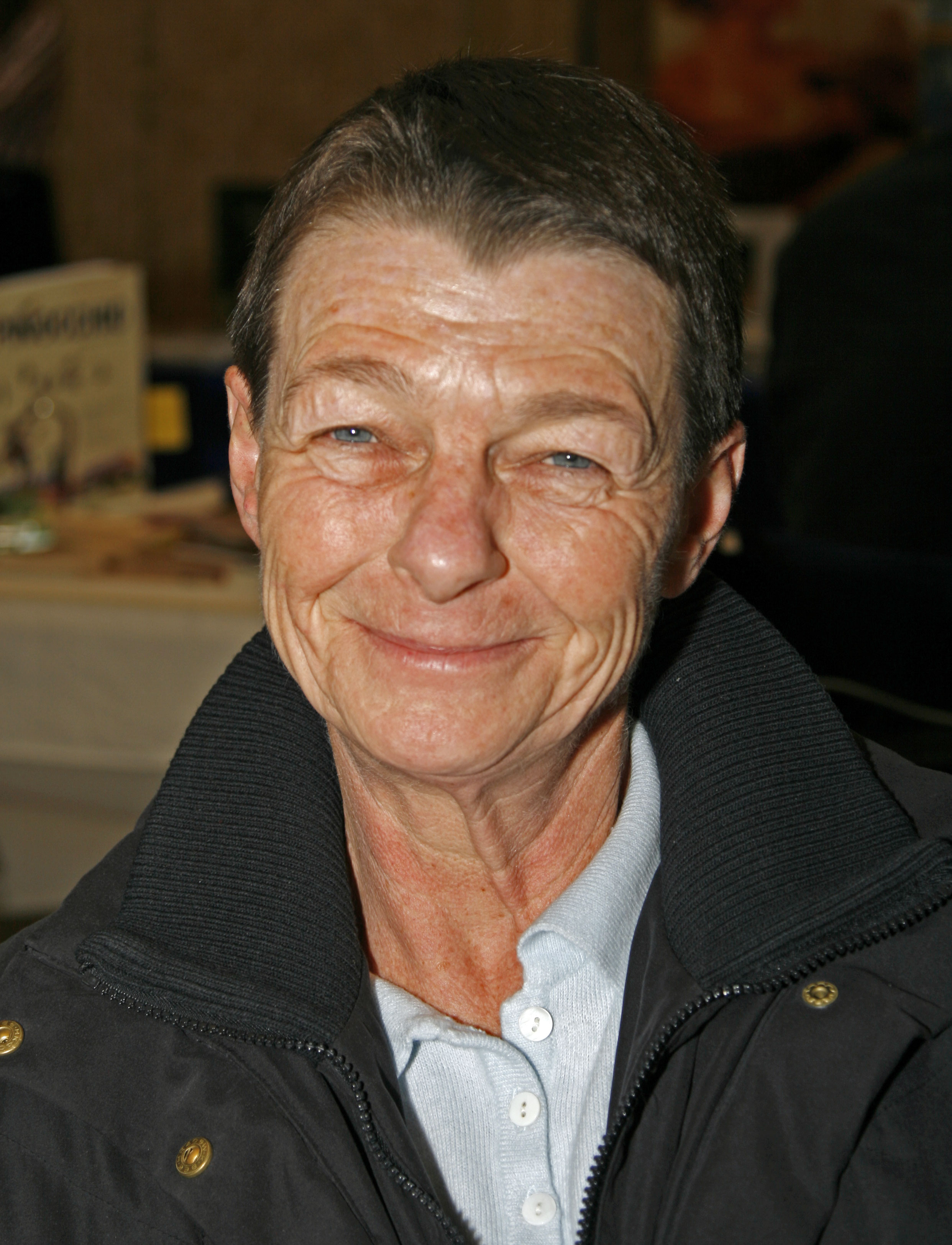
- Kartheiser in November 2007
- Born: November 28, 1950 (age 75); Differdange, Luxembourg
- Education: University of Kent
- Occupations: Journalist; Novelist; Writer

Josiane Kartheiser (born November 28, 1950) is a Luxembourgish journalist, novelist, and writer. She writes mainly in German but also in Luxembourgish. Kartheiser received the Anne Beffort Prize from the City of Luxembourg for her contribution over 25 years to Luxembourg's literary scene at a time when the sector was dominated by men.

== Biography ==
Kartheiser was born in Differdange in 1950. Her father was writer Rene Kartheiser (1926–2009).

Kartheiser matriculated from the Lycée des jeunes filles in Luxembourg City. She studied English and American literature at the University of Luxembourg and then from 1971 to 1974 at the University of Kent in Canterbury. After working as a free-lance journalist, she taught Luxembourgish both at Sheffield University and at Luxembourg's Centre de langues until she retired in 2011. She drew on her language knowledge as a contributor to the French-Luxembourgish-English dictionary Parler luxembourgeois – Esou schwätze mir – Living Luxembourgish. She has been a regular contributor to several Luxembourg newspapers including Lëtzebuerger Journal, Tageblatt and Le Jeudi.

Kartheiser's publications since 1978 have extended from short stories and essays to poetry, plays and literary criticism to criminal fiction and children's writing. She has written more than fifteen books of poems. Kartheiser's biography of Dr. Marie-Paule Molitor-Peffer, Ärztin ohne Furcht und Tabus (Doctor without fear and taboos) was published in 2022. Molitor-Peffer was a pioneer of family planning in Luxembourg, campaigning for increased access to contraception and abortion.

In 2016, Kartheiser co-founded with five other women the association Femmes pionnières du Luxembourg. The association aims “to highlight the role of women in the Luxembourg workplace through exhibitions, conferences, and publications”.

== Awards ==
In July 2010, Josiane Kartheiser received the Anne Beffort Prize from the City of Luxembourg for her contribution over 25 years to Luxembourg's literary scene at a time when the sector was dominated by men. The award reflected Kartheiser's concern for supporting the place of women in Luxembourg society.

== Works ==
Books

- 1978: flirt mit fesseln, essays, poetry
- 1989: wenn schreie in mir wachsen, essays, poetry
- 1981: Linda, short stories
- 1988: D’Lästermailchen, cabaret, songs, stories
- 1989: Luxembourg City, tourist guide
- 1993: Wohlstandsgeschichten, essays, short stories
- 1996: Als Maisie fliegen lernte, short stories
- 2000: Das Seepferdchen, short stories
- 2002: Allein oder mit anderen, short stories, travel articles
- 2004: Cornel Meder. Ein Porträt, biography
- 2005: De Marc hätt gär Paangecher, short stories, cabaret
- 2007: Mäi léiwen Alen!, short stories, cabaret
- 2009: Hutt Dir och en Holiday Consultant?, cabaret, stories, travel
- 2011: Geld oder Liewen!?, cabaret, memoirs
- 2013: Entführe nicht deines Nächsten Weib, crime stories
- 2014: Die Shabby Chic Tote, crime stories
- 2014: Gees de mat?, short story
- 2015: Kauf dir doch ein Leben!, satirical and critical texts, short stories

For children

- 2004: De Maxi an de Geschichtenerzieler
- 2012: Dem Lou säin abenteuerleche Summer

Plays

- 1983: De Kontrakt
- 1985: Härgottskanner
