= Anne Faber =

Luxembourgish cookbook writer and television presenter

Anne Faber is a Luxembourgish writer and television presenter.

== Biography ==
She took an interest in cooking from an early age, purchasing cookbooks rather than novels for leisure reading. She studied English literature and film at the University of Kent, graduating in 2006, before earning a master's degree in English at University College London in 2007 with a dissertation on food in the novels of Roald Dahl. The following year she completed a postgraduate course in journalism from City University London.

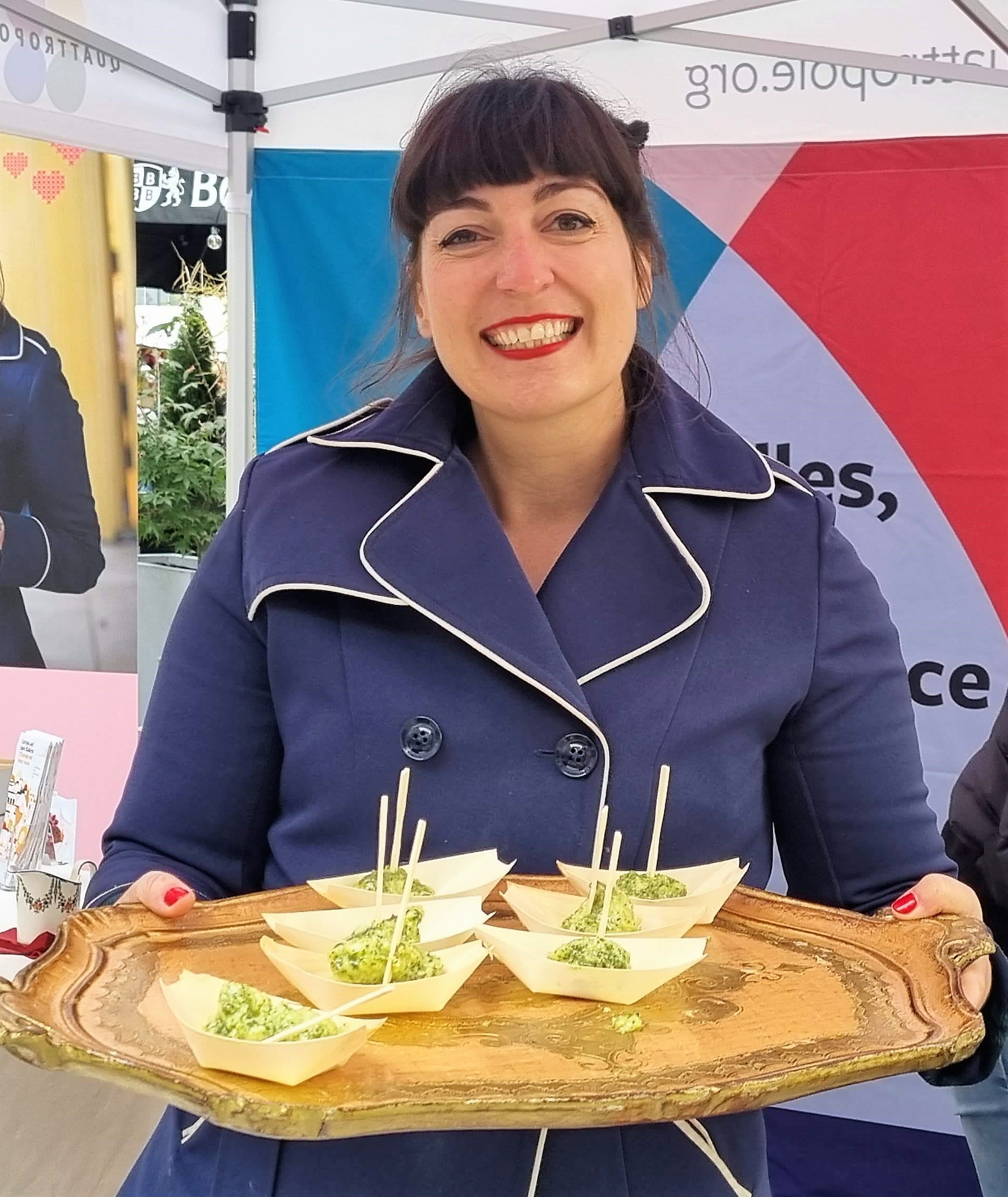
Anne Faber cooking live at the QuattroPole stand on Luxembourg City's weekly market in September 2021

While still in London, she worked as a reporter and television producer for APTN, ZDF and RTL. In 2010, to keep track of her recipes, she started her Anne's Kitchen blog, receiving an award from Food & Wine in 2013. She quickly went on to write a cookbook in parallel with a 12-part television series on RTL television, presenting British dishes to Luxembourgers. In an interview with Luxemburger Wort she explained:

I really always enjoyed British food ... It has a bad reputation but has a lot in common with Luxembourg food in the way it's humble food made with simple ingredients. It's comfort food for cold days. All the products we use in Luxembourg are the same as the British use. I wanted to share my love for my new home through their food.

September 2014 saw the publication of her second book, Anne's Kitchen: Barcelona, Istanbul, Berlin which also led to a second television series with ten episodes covering the three cities. In April 2015, in connection with an international book tour, Faber was invited to make a presentation at the Luxembourg Embassy in Washington, D.C. In 2016, back in Luxembourg, she published her third book, Anne's Kitchen, Home Sweet Home...My Luxembourg, in both English and German editions. This time, she presented her own recipes based on traditional Luxembourg dishes but also included snacks, starters and cocktails. An immediate best-seller in Luxembourg, it is designed to accompany by another RTL television series.

== Publications ==
- Faber, Anne. 2013. Anne's Kitchen. Editions Schortgen. ISBN 978-2-87953-187-8.
- Faber, Anne. 2014. Anne's Kitchen - Barcelona-Istanbul-Berlin. Editions Schortgen. ISBN 978-99959-36-09-9.
- Faber, Anne. 2016. Anne's Kitchen: Home Sweet Home - My Luxembourg. Editions Schortgen. ISBN 978-99959-36-32-7.
