= Anne Beffort =

Anne Beffort (4 July 1880 – 20 July 1966) was a Luxembourgish educator, literary writer and biographer. She is remembered for her works on Victor Hugo and Alexandre Soumet and for her support of French culture in Luxembourg.

== Biography ==
Born in the Neudorf district of Luxembourg City, she was the daughter of a gardener. After completing her secondary education at Notre-Dame Sainte-Sophie, she qualified as a teacher at the École normale des institutrices. After working as a schoolteacher in Roedgen, she studied French literature at Münster University in Germany and at the Sorbonne in Paris. In 1909, together with Marie Speyer, she was the first Luxembourg woman to obtain a doctorate thanks to her thesis on the French poet Alexandre Soumet. On returning to Luxembourg, she was one of the first teachers at the newly established Lycée de Jeunes Filles. From 1930, in addition to her teaching work, she was an ardent supporter of French culture, undertaking research on a number of French authors, especially Victor Hugo.

In 1934, she was one of the founding members of the Société des écrivains luxembourgeois d'expression française (Association of Luxembourg Authors writing in French), supporting French culture even during the German occupation of Luxembourg in the Second World War. Beffort also succeeded in encouraging the State of Luxembourg to buy the house in Vianden where Victor Hugo had stayed in 1871 in order to open it as a museum.

Throughout her career, Anne Beffort contributed articles to Luxembourg journals and newspapers on her literary research, always striving to achieve greater synergy between the cultures of France and Luxembourg. In addition to covering the history and cultural life of the Clausen district of Luxembourg where she lived, her Souvenirs also covers writings on Victor Hugo, especially his Les Misérables.

== Awards ==
In 1948, in connection with the opening of the Victor Hugo Museum in Vianden, Anne Beffort was decorated by Robert Schuman with the French Legion of Honour for her services to France, especially her efforts to support French culture during the German occupation of Luxembourg. In commemoration of her contribution to women's rights in Luxembourg, the Prix Anne Beffort has been awarded annually since 2003 by the Luxembourg City's Commission for the Promotion of Equal Rights for men and women.

== Selected works ==
- Beffort, Anna, 1908. Alexandre Soumet, sa vie et ses oeuvres. Thèse Th. lett. Paris. 101 p. J. Beffort, Luxembourg.
- Beffort, Anne, 1926. L'enfant dans l'oeuvre de Victor Hugo et particulièrement dans « Les misérables ». In: Programme publié à la clôture de l'année scolaire 1925–1926 / Lycée grand-ducal de Jeunes Filles de Luxembourg = Programm herausgegeben am Schlusse des Schuljahres 1925–1926 / Grossherzogliches Mädchenlyzeum zu Luxemburg. Linden & Hansen, Luxembourg. pp. 1–46.
- Beffort, Anne, 1938. Les amis de Victor Hugo. In: Friedrich, Evy (Hrsg.) 1938. Oesling : Ardenner Heimatblätter Nr. 6: 50–51. Emile Schumacher & Cie., Diekirch.
- Beffort, Anne, 1939. Au centenaire de notre indépendance. Luxemburger Lehrer-Zeitung Jg. 34, Nr. 4 u. 5, p. 97–100. Luxembourg.
- Beffort, Anne, 1961. Souvenirs. Tome I: sans titre, 311 p. Tome II: Victor Hugo et nous. 215 p. Linden, Luxembourg.
- Beffort, Anne, 1966. Marcel Noppeney, poète et martyr de Dachau. Les Pages de la S.E.L.F. XIII: 16–20. Luxembourg.
