= Marie Henriette Steil =

Luxembourgish writer and feminist (1898–1930)

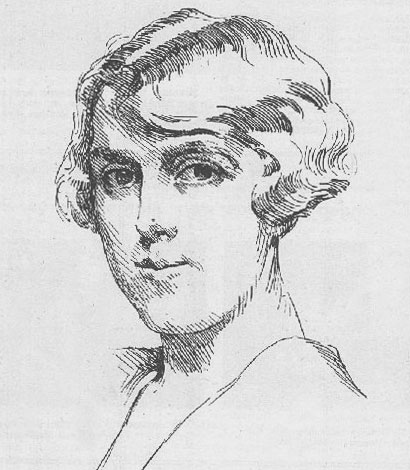
Marie Henriette Steil

Marie Henriette Steil (3 August 1898 – 18 December 1930) was a Luxembourgish writer and feminist. After publishing some short pieces in Les Cahiers luxembourgeois, she aspired to become a professional writer but died when she was only 32. Her early works appeared as short stories in Luxembourg newspapers. She wrote a newspaper column, and then published a collection of allegorical tales in Leipzig in 1926, titled Tier und Mensch. Harmlose Geschichten (Animal and Man. Harmless Stories). The Luxembourg Post Office issued a stamp in her memory in 2005, with her portrait, and her allegorical tales were released as an audiobook in 2021.

== Life ==
Born in Luxembourg City, Steil is known to have been keen to assert her independence as a woman and to have promoted feministic trends such as a boyish hairstyle.

Her earliest works were published in Luxembourg newspapers, after she submitted stories to a competition run by Luxemburger Zeitung. They included the story Der Mond und das Mädchen (The Moon and the Maiden) which she sent in to a contest organized by the Luxemburger Zeitung. Other newspapers she contributed to included Jonghémecht, Junge Welt and Tageblatt. In Les Cahiers luxembourgeois she maintained a column Lettres de Suzette à Micromégas. She also wrote for the Berliner Lokalanzeiger and other German newspapers including Ullsteins Frauenblätter and Welt am Montag. In 1926, Steil completed a collection of short stories titled Tier und Mensch. Harmlose Geschichten (Animal and Man. Harmless Stories) which was published in Leipzig. In these allegorical, satirical tales, animals take on the roles of human beings while humans behave like animals.

Marie Henriette Steil died in Luxembourg City on 18 December 1930 at the age of 32, of a haemorrhage.

== Legacy ==
In September 2005, the Luxembourg Post Office issued a stamp in her memory bearing the sketched portrait displayed here. Her work Tier und Mensch. Harmlose Geschichten (Animal and Man. Harmless Stories) was released as an audiobook by the Centre national de littérature in 2021, narrated by actor Steve Karier.
