= Margret Steckel =

German-born Luxembourgish writer

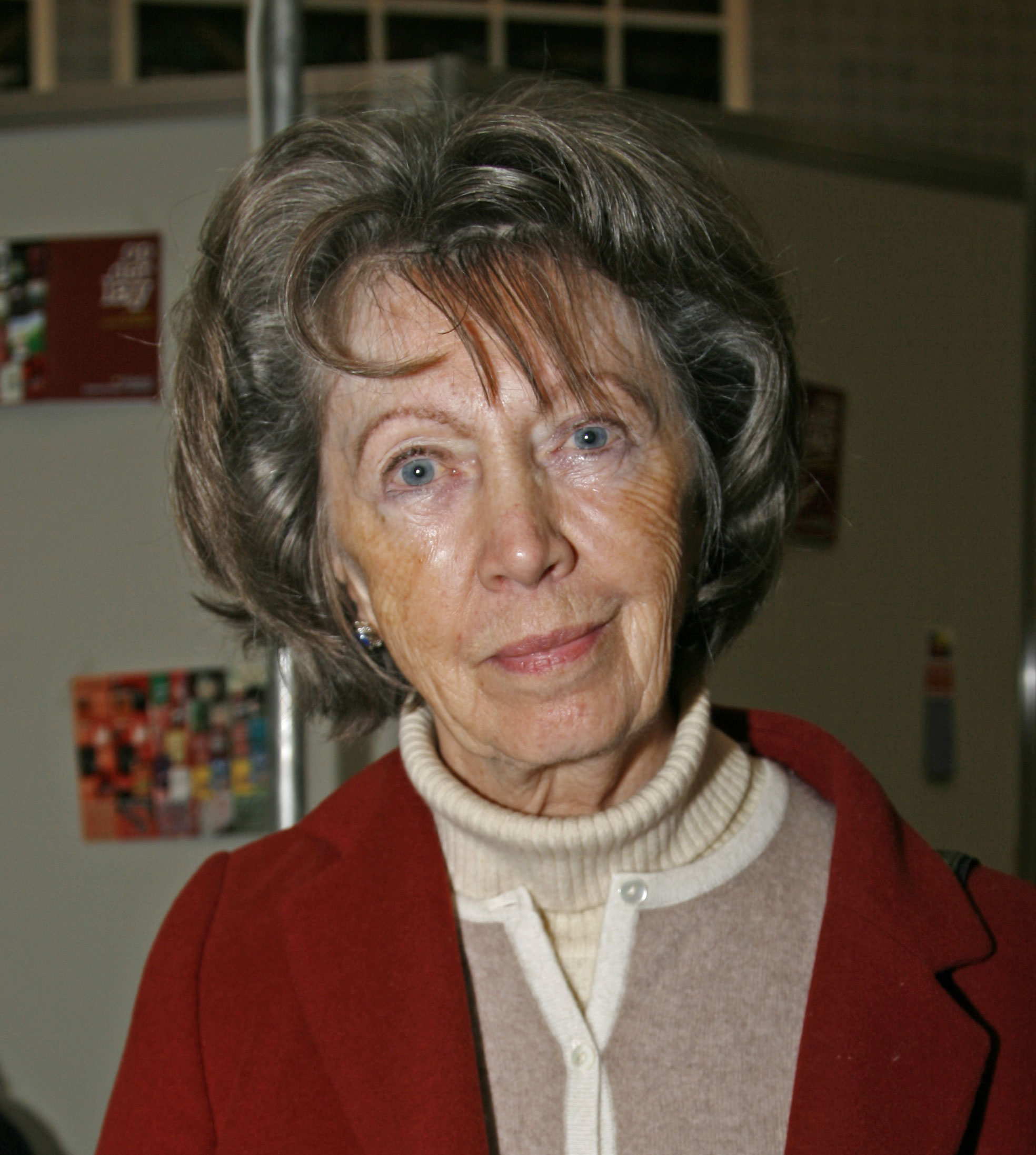
Margret Steckel

Margret Steckel (born Ehmkendorf, near Mecklenburg, 26 April 1934) is a Luxembourgish writer of German birth. She was the first woman to win the Servais Prize when she was awarded it in 1997 for Der Letzte vom Bayrischen Platz. In 2023 Steckel was awarded Luxembourg's 2023 Batty Weber Prize.

== Life ==
Steckel was born on 26 April 1934, in Ehmkendorf, near Mecklenburg, Germany. She lived in Nazi Germany as a teenager, and then East Germany. She moved to West Berlin after finishing school in 1955, to study translation and interpretation. She work in dramaturgy in the field industry before moving to Ireland in the 1960s; she also lived in England before settling in Luxembourg in 1983. She married in 1964. She began writing after moving to Luxembourg. Her short stories and novels are strongly autobiographical.

One of Steckel's most significant works is her 2010 historical saga "Servais. Roman einer Familie", which took her thirteen years to write. Steckel has written for magazines, including "D'Lëtzebuerger Land," "Revue," and the "Tageblatt" supplement "Livres-Bücher.", and worked for Radio 100.7 and for the literary magazine "Frequenzen" on RTL.

== Awards ==
In 1997 Steckel was awarded the Servais Prize for her story Der Letzte vom Bayrischen Platz, which revolves around a young man in Berlin in the 1930s and 1940s. She was the first woman to win the Servais Prize.

In 2023 Steckel was awarded the Batty Weber Prize, which is a Luxembourgish prize awarded for 'literary quality, originality and the cultural impact of the body of work'.
