= Dudelange =

Dudelange Diddeleng (Luxembourgish) Düdelingen (German)
- Commune
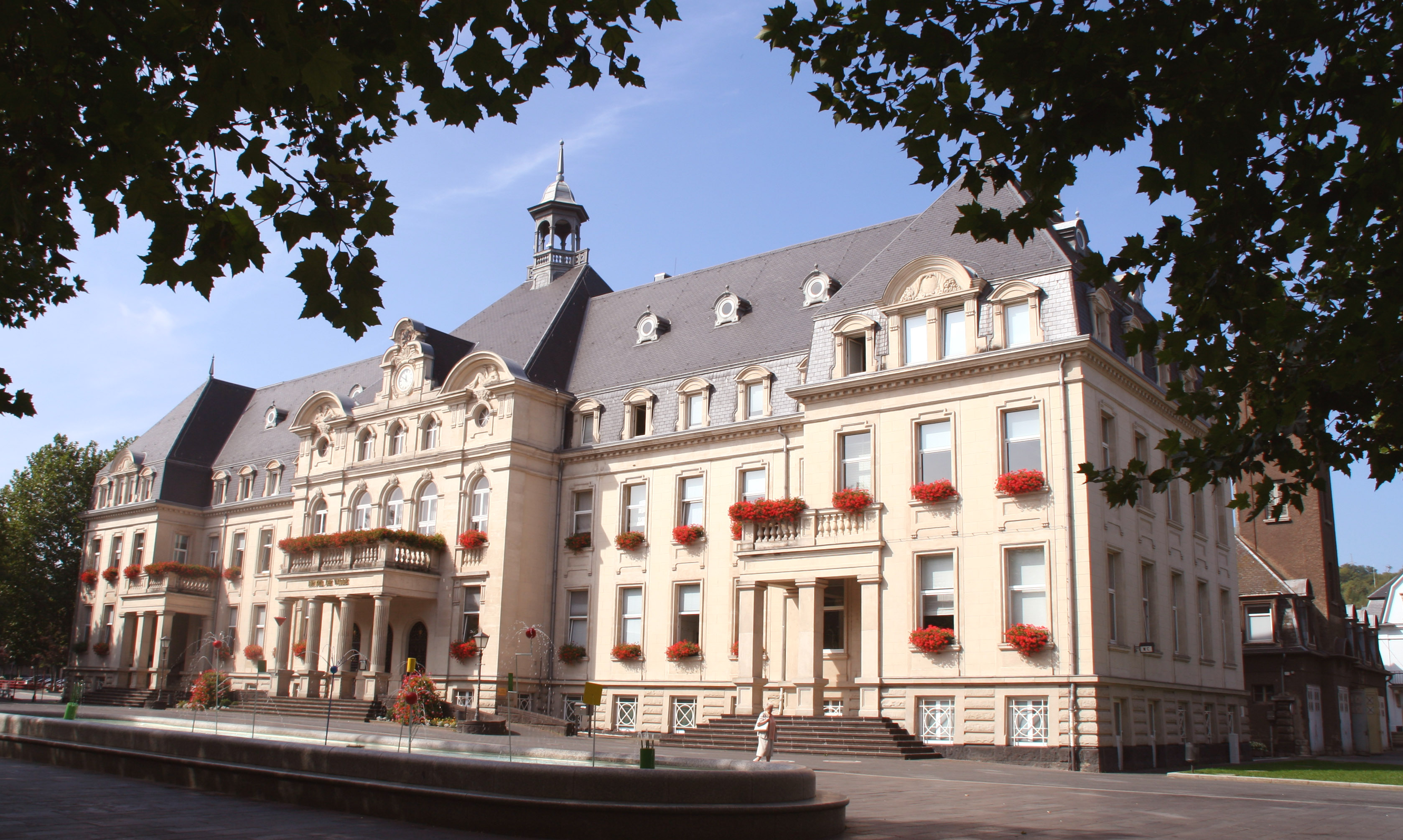
- The town hall

- Coat of arms Logo
- Interactive map of Dudelange
- Coordinates: 49.4833°N 6.0833°E
- Country: Luxembourg
- Canton: Esch-sur-Alzette

Government
  - Mayor: Dan Biancalana (LSAP)

Area
  - Total: 21.38 km^{2} (8.25 sq mi)
  - Rank: 51st of 100
- Highest elevation: 435 m (1,427 ft)
  - Rank: 26th of 100
- Lowest elevation: 256 m (840 ft)
  - Rank: 60th of 100

Population (2026)
  - Total: 22,460
  - Rank: 4th of 100
  - Density: 1,051/km^{2} (2,721/sq mi)
  - Rank: 7th of 100
- Time zone: UTC+1 (CET)
  - Summer (DST): UTC+2 (CEST)
- LAU 2: LU0000203
- Website: dudelange.lu

Dudelange (French: [dyd(ə)lɑ̃ʒ]; Luxembourgish: Diddeleng [ˈdidəleŋ]; German: Düdelingen [ˈdyːdəlɪŋən]) is a commune with city status in southern Luxembourg. It is the fourth-most populous commune, with 22,043 inhabitants. Dudelange is situated close to the border with France.

The commune also includes the smaller town of Budersberg, to the north-west. The Mont Saint-Jean, close to Budersberg, hosts the ruins of a medieval castle. In 1794 the French Revolutionary Army committed atrocities against the local population in Dudelange, when they massacred 79 civilians.

Dudelange is an important industrial town that grew out of the three villages and a steel mill in 1900. The D in the name of the ARBED steel company, later merged into ArcelorMittal, stood for Dudelange. As well as the Dudelange Radio Tower, an FM radio and television transmitter, it is also the site of the Centre national de l’audiovisuel (CNA), a cultural institute founded in 1989 under the aegis of the Ministry of Culture in order to preserve, promote and exhibit Luxembourg's audiovisual and photographic heritage. The centre hosts a two-screen cinema, a restaurant and a library focused on the visual arts.

On 14 February 2017 the Dudelange train collision happened here.

== Population ==
Historical population

Year	Pop.	±%
1821	1,398	—
1851	1,652	+18.2%
1900	8,741	+429.1%
1910	10,803	+23.6%
1922	10,307	−4.6%
1935	13,572	+31.7%

Year	Pop.	±%
1947	12,878	−5.1%
1960	14,617	+13.5%
1970	14,615	−0.0%
1981	14,072	−3.7%
1990	14,254	+1.3%
2000	17,060	+19.7%

Year	Pop.	±%
2005	17,746	+4.0%
2010	18,507	+4.3%
2015	19,734	+6.6%
2020	21,291	+7.9%
2021	21,513	+1.0%

Source data

== Sports ==
Dudelange is home to Luxembourg's most successful football club in recent times. F91 Dudelange won nine national titles between 2000 and 2011.

== Church organ ==
The Stahlhuth/Jann organ in Dudelange is a grand romantic organ, with influences from Germany, France and England, which has been recorded as "sample sets" for use by Hauptwerk and other proprietary organ software.

== Notable people ==
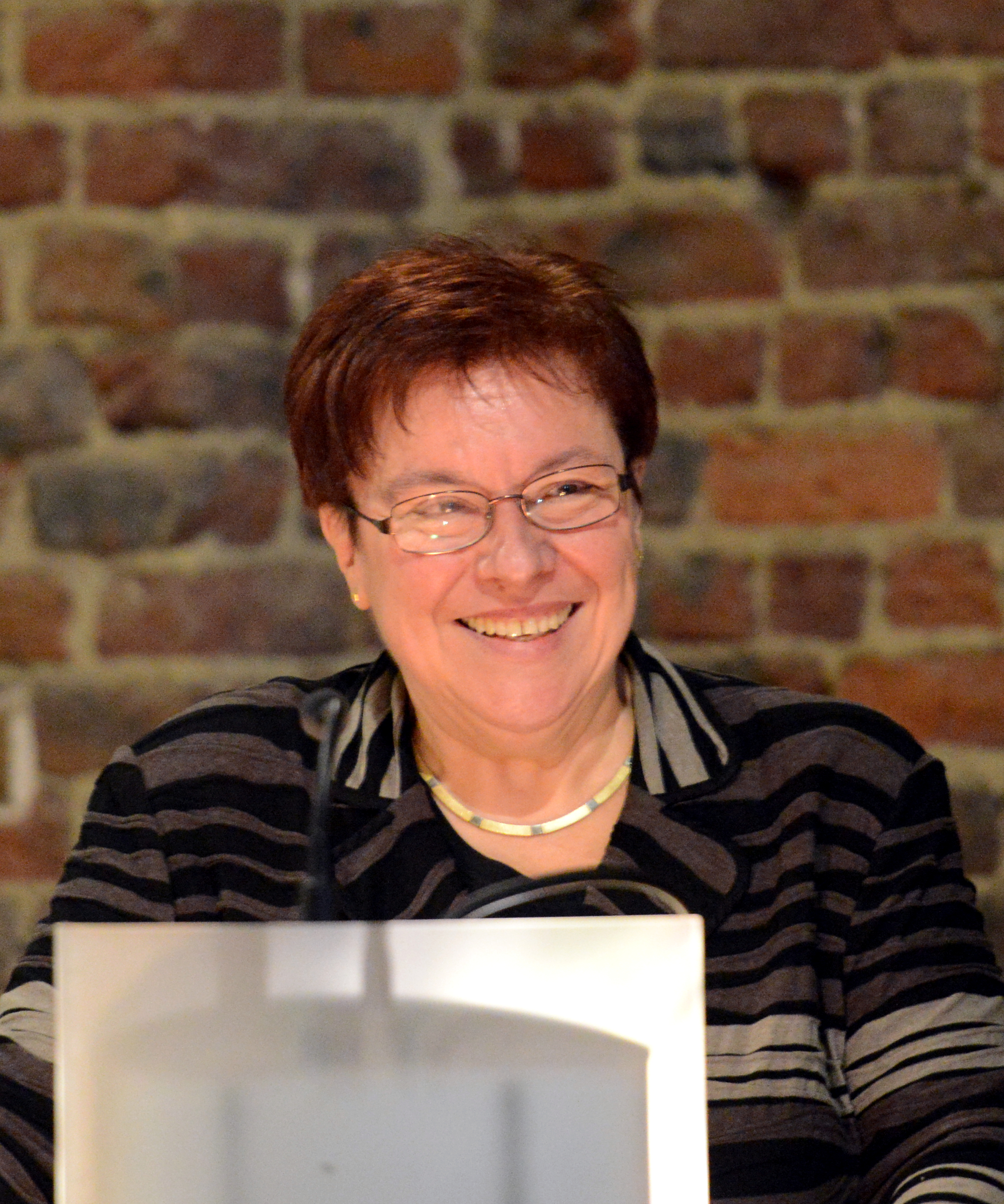
Germaine Goetzinger, 2013

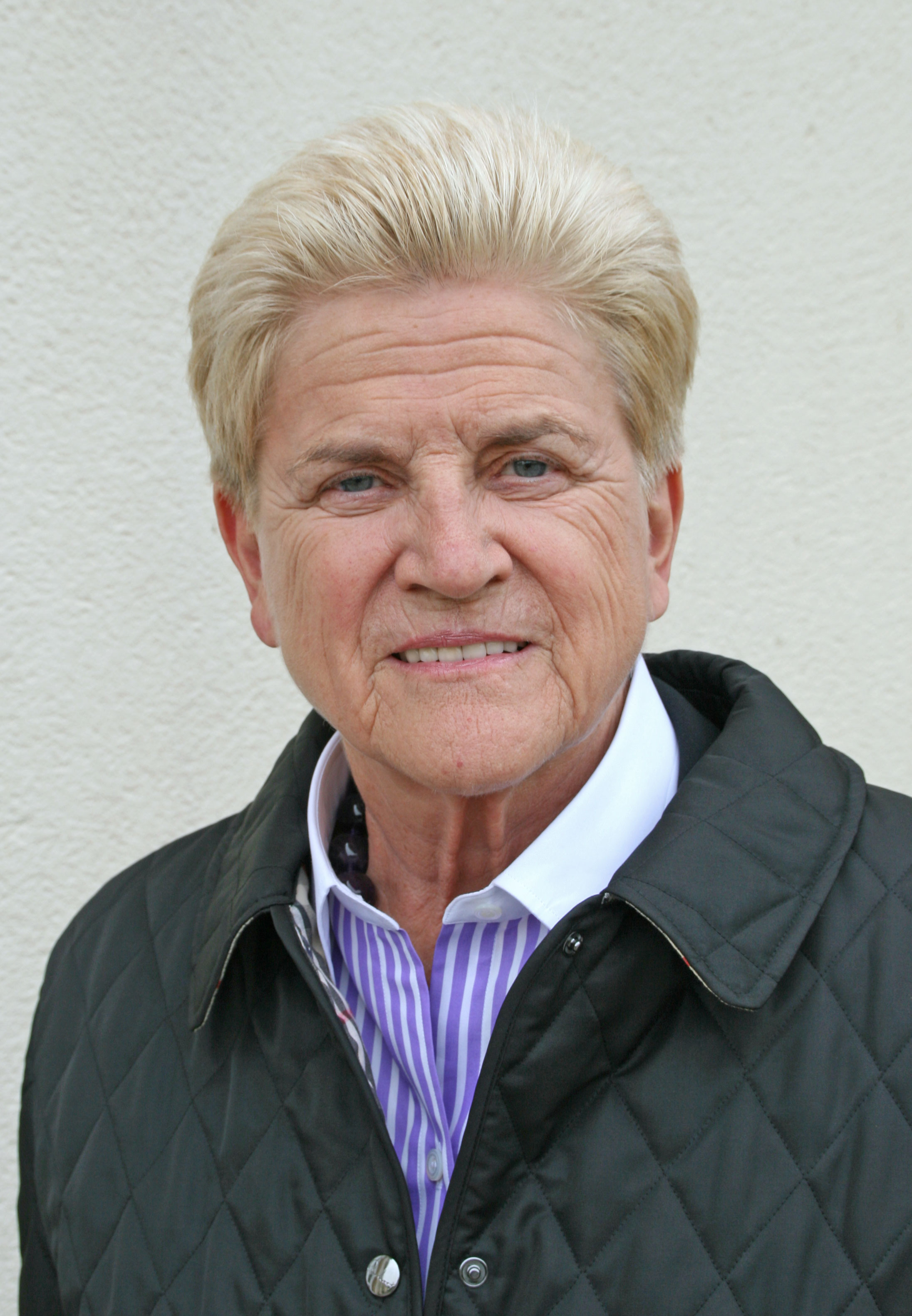
Colette Flesch, 2007

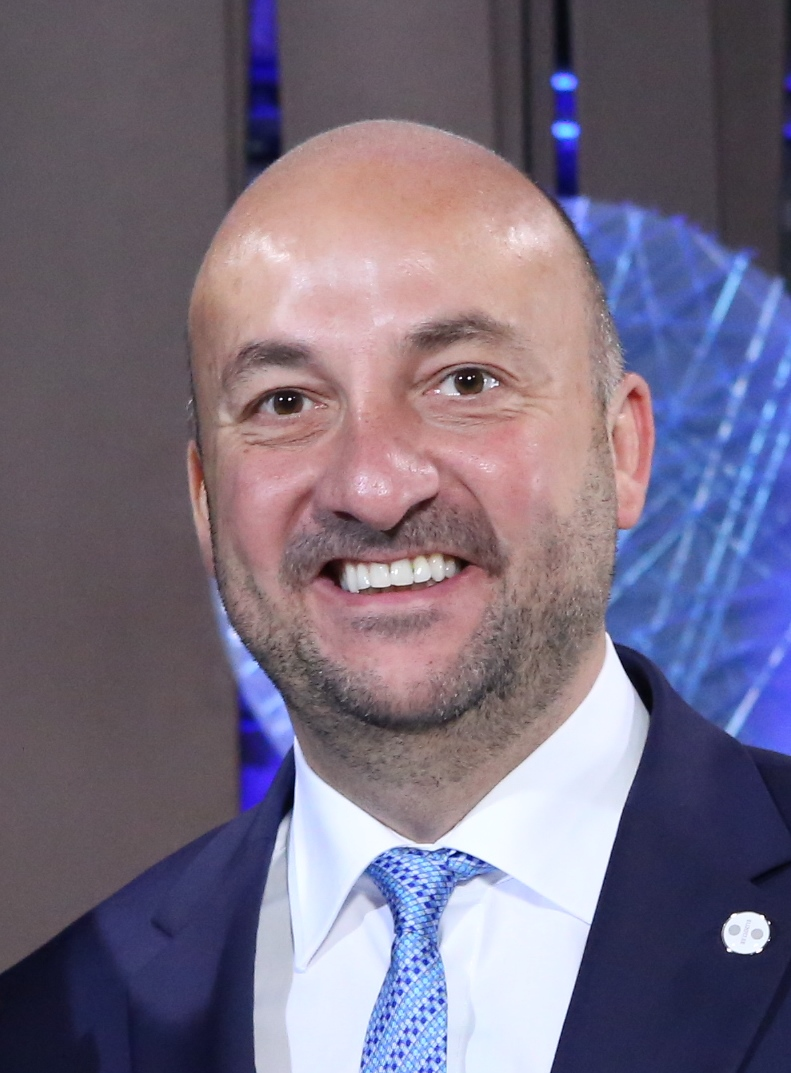
Etienne Schneider, 2017

- Dominique Lang (1874–1919), Impressionist painter
- Jean Hengen (1912–2005), prelate of the Roman Catholic Church, Bishop of Luxembourg, 1971-1990
- Pierre Cao (1937-2026) a Luxembourgish composer and conductor
- Germaine Goetzinger (born 1947) a Luxembourgish writer, historian, educator and feminist
- Jean Back (born 1953) a Luxembourgish writer, photographer and civil servant
- Roland Bombardella (born 1957), soldier and retired sprinter, competed in the 1976 Summer Olympics

=== Politics ===
- Nicolas Biever (1894–1965) a Luxembourgish politician
- Bernard Berg (1931–2019) a Luxembourgish politician and trade unionist
- Colette Flesch (1937-2026), politician and former fencer, Mayor of Luxembourg City (1969-1980) and Deputy Prime Minister (1980-1984).
- Erna Hennicot-Schoepges (born 1941) a Luxembourgish politician
- Mars Di Bartolomeo (born 1952) a Luxembourgish politician
- Alex Bodry (born 1958) a politician from Luxembourg.
- Lydia Mutsch (born 1961) a Luxembourgish politician
- Josée Lorsché (born 1961), Green member of the Chamber of Deputies (2011-2023)
- Etienne Schneider (born 1971) a Luxembourgish politician and economist, former Deputy Prime Minister and Minister of the Economy.

=== Sport ===
- Jos Romersa (1915–2016) a Luxembourgish gymnast who competed in the 1936 Summer Olympics
- Camille Libar (1917–1991) a football player and manager from Luxembourg
- Bruno Mattiussi (1926–1981) a Luxembourgish boxer, competed at light middleweight at the 1952 Summer Olympics
- Fred Stürmer (1927–2014) a Luxembourgish boxer, competed in the middleweight at the 1952 Summer Olympics
- Jean Schmit (1931–2010), cyclist, competed in events at the 1952 Summer Olympics
- Robert Schiel (born 1939) a Luxembourgish fencer, competed at the 1960, 1972 and 1976 Summer Olympics
- Roger Gilson (1947–1995), cyclist, competed in the individual road race at the 1968 Summer Olympics
- René Peters (born 1981), footballer, former captain of the national team and played 91 games for them
- Kari Peters (born 1985) a Luxembourgish cross-country skier, competed at the 2014 Winter Olympics
- Ben Gastauer (born 1987), professional cyclist
- Fleur Maxwell (born 1988) a Luxembourgish figure skater, competed in the 2006 Winter Olympics

== Twin towns – sister cities ==
Dudelange is twinned with:

- Arganil, Portugal
- Berane, Montenegro
- Feltre, Italy
- Lauenburg, Germany
- Lębork (until 1945 Lauenburg), Poland
- Manom, France

== See also ==
- List of mayors of Dudelange
