= Servais Prize =

Luxembourgian literary award

The Servais Prize for Literature (French: Prix Servais pour la littérature) is a Luxembourgish literary award, awarded since 1992 by the Servais Foundation. It is judged by a jury, and can be bestowed upon any writer from Luxembourg, regardless of format or language.

== List of laureates ==
Year	Laureate	Work
1992	Roger Manderscheid	De Papagei um Käschtebam
1993	Pol Greisch	Äddi Charel – Besuch – E Stéck Streisel
1994	Jean Portante	Mrs. Hallory ou Les mémoires d'une baleine
1995	Joseph Kohnen	Special prize – for Kohnen's life work
1996	Lex Jacoby	Wasserzeichen
1997	Margret Steckel	Der Letzte vom Bayrischen Platz
1998	José Ensch	Dans les cages du vent
1999	Jhemp Hoscheit	Perl oder Pica
2000	Pol Schmoetten	Der Tag des Igels
2001	Roland Harsch	Laub und Nadel
2002	Guy Helminger	Rost
2003	Jean Sorrente	Et donc tout un roman
2004	Claudine Muno	Frigo
2005	Jean-Paul Jacobs	Jenes Gedicht & Mit nichts
2006	Guy Rewenig	Passt die Maus ins Schneckenhaus?
2007	Lambert Schlechter	Le murmure du monde
2008	Anise Koltz	L'ailleurs des mots
2009	Pol Sax	U5
2010	Tania Naskandy (alias of Guy Rewenig)	Sibiresch Eisebunn
2011	Jean Krier	Herzens Lust Spiele
2012	Gilles Ortlieb	Tombeau des anges
2013	Pol Greisch	De Monni aus Amerika
2014	Nico Helminger	Abrasch
2015	Roland Meyer	Roughmix
2016	Jean Portante	L'Architecture des temps instables
2017	Nora Wagener	Larven. Kurze Geschichten
2018	Nico Helminger	Kuerz Chronik vum Menn Malkowitsch sengen Deeg an der Loge
2019	Elise Schmit	Stürze aus unterschiedlichen Fallhöhen
2020	Francis Kirps	Die Mutationen. 7 Geschichten & 1 Gedicht
2021	Ulrike Bail	wie viele faden tief
2022	Guy Helminger	Lärm
2023	Jérôme Quiqueret	Tout devait disparaître. Histoire véridique d'un double meutre commis à Esch-sur-Alzette à fin de l'été 1910
2024	Samuel Hamen	Wie die Fliegen
2025	Anne-Marie Reuter	M for Amnesia

== Encouragement Prize ==
Year	Laureate	Work
2001	Isabelle Kronz	Hélène et les Max
2009	Hélène Tyrtoff	Corps expéditionnaire
2010	Nathalie Ronvaux	Vignes et Louves
2016	Luc van den Bossche	Sangs
2017	Anita Gretsch	L'œil grand fermé
2019	Jean Bürlesk	The Pleasure of Drowning
2022	Julien Jeusette	Vies provisoires

== See also ==
- Literature of Luxembourg
