= The Floor (American game show) =

2024 game show hosted by Rob Lowe

- Genre: Game show
- Created by: John de Mol
- Based on: The Floor
- Directed by: Diccon Ramsay (season 1); Ollie Bartlett (season 2 – present)
- Presented by: Rob Lowe
- Theme music composer: Vanacore Music
- Country of origin: United States
- Original language: English
- No. of seasons: 6
- No. of episodes: 65

Production
- Executive producers: John de Mol; Mark van Achterberg; Maarten Meijs; Chris Culvenor; Paul Franklin; Anthony Carbone; Eden Gaha; Wes Dening; Jayne Parker; Pat Kiely; Sean O'Riordan; Shane Byrne
- Producers: Rob Lowe; Micki Boden; Jennifer Colbert; Riham El-Ounsi; Sam King; Jen Livengood; Abigail McCutcheon; Randy Strickland; Mia Taylor
- Production locations: Ardmore Studios; Bray, Ireland
- Editors: Jason Dolder; Joss Holmes; Cian McDevitt; Barry Osment; Brian Phillips; Andy Selzer; Dan Shirley; Emmanuel Stratford; Conal Tracey; Richard Waters
- Camera setup: Multi-camera
- Running time: 43 minutes
- Production companies: Eureka Productions; Talpa; BiggerStage; Fox Entertainment

Original release
- Network: Fox
- Release: January 2, 2024 – present

The Floor is an American game show based on the Dutch game show of the same name. The series is hosted by Rob Lowe and premiered on January 2, 2024, on Fox. Standing in separate LED squares of a floor grid, contestants with expertise in a variety of trivia subjects challenge each other in head-to-head duels, with the winner of each duel taking over all territory controlled by the loser. The winner then chooses whether to go on the offensive to try and gain more territory or let the Floor choose a new challenger. The contestant who gains full control over the Floor takes home $250,000 as the grand prize for winning the game.

Fox announced on June 29, 2023, that it ordered the series. Season 1 was recorded August 2–6, 2023 at Ardmore Studios in Bray, Ireland. An announcement on September 13, 2023, named Rob Lowe as host and producer. On November 6, 2023, Fox announced that the series would premiere on January 2, 2024. On May 12, 2024, the show renewed for a second and a third season. The second season premiered on September 25, 2024. On November 18, 2024, Fox announced that the third season would premiere on February 9, 2025, following Super Bowl LIX, and keeping its regular timeslot starting on February 12, 2025. On May 10, 2025, the show renewed for a fourth and fifth season. The fourth season premiered on September 24, 2025. The fifth season premiered on April 8, 2026. On February 6, 2026, the show renewed for a sixth and seventh season. The sixth season premiered on September 13, 2026.

== Format ==
Each season begins with a pool of contestants standing in separate square spaces of a large grid on the studio floor. The show is filmed over a week. Each contestant has a category in which they feel particularly knowledgeable. However, the producers of the show ultimately decide the categories the contestants have. Season 1 featured 81 contestants on a 9-by-9 grid; as of season 2, 100 contestants play on a 10-by-10 grid. The floor measures 20 by 12 meters, or roughly 66 by 39 feet.

The game progresses over the course of a season with the grand prize awarded to the contestant who ultimately controls the entire floor. Secondary prizes are awarded throughout the season to the contestant with the most territory at the end of each episode after a certain number of duels (usually eight, but on the occasion nine). For seasons two, three, and five, every third episode (disregarding the finale's tiebreaker) has nine duels per episode. For the fourth season, every third and fourth episode (excluding the final two episodes) has nine duels per episode.

One contestant is chosen at random (via "The Randomizer") to be a challenger and shown the categories of all opponents whose territories border their own vertically or horizontally, then chooses one of them to challenge face-to-face in a head-to-head duel. The specifics of the duel remain undisclosed until the challenger selects an opponent, with the format defaulting to visual unless specified otherwise by the host. The two contestants take turns identifying a series of images or words associated with the challenged opponent's category. They are each given separate 45-second clocks, only one of which runs at any given time, starting with the challenger. The contestant in control must give a correct answer to stop their clock and turn control over to their opponent. Infinite guesses are allowed without penalty, and a contestant may pass whenever desired; however, they must wait three seconds for a new image or text to be shown. Some categories are text-based, requiring contestants to perform tasks such as filling in the missing word(s) of a book title or song lyric, or naming the movie from which a famous quote is taken. Season 2 introduced audio duels, in which the contestant has to decipher the answer via audio cue with visuals provided to indicate turn order. Season 3 introduced association duels, in which the contestant is shown three clues and must state their common link. Season 4 introduced video duels, which show clips instead of images. Season 5 introduced close-up duels, in which the contestant has to decipher the clue while zoomed. Once a category has been selected and played, it is permanently removed from play and cannot be chosen again, ensuring each category can only be played once.

The first contestant to run out of time is eliminated from the game (if the category is completed with all images or clues identified within time, the contestant with more time left wins the duel) and gives up all of their territory to the winner, who inherits the challenger's category or keeps their own (if the challenger). The winner may then either challenge another opponent or return to the grid; in the latter case, a new contestant is selected as a challenger at random from those who have not yet played a duel. This rule is a change from the original Dutch format, and instituted to prevent contestants from reaching the final duel without having already faced an opponent. Once all the remaining contestants have played a duel at least once, everyone becomes eligible for selection as a challenger. When only two contestants remain, the one controlling more territory (in season 1) decides which category is played. The other category remains unplayed. Beginning with season 2, the final duel is played as a best-of-three, with the first contestant to win two rounds declared the champion. Each remaining category is used for one of the first two rounds only. The contestant in control only selects which of the two known remaining categories will be played first (they will be the challenger in the first round, while the winner of the first round is the challenger in the second). If a third round is necessary, it will be played with a mystery category. The contestant who goes first will be decided randomly in the tiebreaker round.

At the end of each episode, apart from the final episode, the contestant holding the most territory wins $20,000 (increased to $40,000 in season 4 for the first episode only). In the event of a tie, the leaders share the money equally. The last contestant standing at the end of the final episode of the season (2 hours in season 1, 4 and 5 (Note: In season 1, the final night featured two combined episodes, and the winner of the penultimate episode won $20,000, but it went unaired.) and one hour in seasons 2 and 3 (Note: In season 4, the final night featured two combined episodes, and the winner of the penultimate episode did not win $20,000. In season 5, the winner of the penultimate episode won $20,000.)) takes over the entire floor and wins the grand prize of $250,000. The overall prize pot is $430,000 in season 1, $470,000 in seasons 2, 3 and 5 and $480,000 in season 4.

Beginning with season 2, contestants who achieve three consecutive duel victories (by electing to play on twice after any win) are awarded a five-second "Time Boost". This bonus can be added once to the contestant's clock at the start of any subsequent duel, with the exception of the best-of-three final round, in which the Time Boost is not permitted and is therefore removed from play. A contestant in possession of a Time Boost must elect to use it before a duel starts. If a duel is won with a Time Boost (or the time boost is saved for later), it is counted as a win towards another (as of the fifth season). However, a player may only hold one time boost at a time, and if a player wins thrice and already holds a time boost, another time boost cannot be earned. If a contestant chooses to return to the floor before three consecutive wins are earned, the win total is reset to zero.

Starting with season 4, contestants who achieve three consecutive duel victories will be able to choose to steal a category from another contestant (swapping with them) or receive a time boost. A category may be stolen while also holding a time boost but the category steal must be used immediately. After either bonus is chosen, the win total is reset to zero.

In addition, in season 4, one space was secretly designated as the "Golden Square", which rewarded a $10,000 bonus to whoever wins a duel after the category from that square is challenged.

In season 5, the contestant who had won the most duels at the midway point of the season was awarded the "Territory Freeze", meaning that the contestant cannot be challenged by any other contestants until everyone else has played at least one duel. Any players who are unable to eventually challenge another player due to frozen territory will at some point after the freeze has concluded be moved to the nearest open bordering square(s) so they can continue to play. The frozen territory will claim any unclaimed empty square(s) that remain after the move, maintaining the same amount of territory (# of spaces) as they had before the move.

Season 6 introduced the "Power Shot", where one contestant can select another contestant to be the next challenger after having won three duels in a row and then returning to the floor, instead of the randomizer selecting the next challenger. The Power Shot can even be applied to contestants who have already dueled while players who have not dueled remain.

== Results by contestant ==
Original categories are listed first & shown in boldface. Inherited categories are listed after the original category without boldface. A hyphen indicates a more specific topic in the associated category. The specific topic is italicized. Parentheses indicate what a category refers to if a colloquial phrase; it also specifies the category's style of play if specified to be non-visual or text-based (audio, association, video, etc.). A ~~strikethrough~~ indicates a stolen category from its owner by another contestant (The contestant who stole or took the category is listed). A golden square has the square number colored golden. [] Brackets indicate the remaining words of a topic that have had their title shortened. A cyan square indicates that the contestant has earned the Territory Freeze.

=== Season 1 ===
Results (Season 1)
Name	Job	City	Age	Category	Space Assignment	Duels	Duels Played	Episodes Won	Exited
Sid Simone	CEO of Staffing Company	Muskegon, Michigan	35	**Veggies**	42	1. Tools – Zai defeats Sid (Ep. 1)	1	N/A	Episode 1
Zai Karaha-Petion	Daycare Teacher	Philadelphia, Pennsylvania	28	**Tools**; Veggies	43	1. Tools – Zai defeats Sid (Ep. 1); 2. Cars – Greg defeats Zai (Ep. 1)	2	N/A	Episode 1
Tory Jason	Art Director	New York City	30	**Bugs**	80	3. A-Listers – Natalia defeats Tory (Ep. 1)	1	N/A	Episode 1
Kat Ross	Real Estate Agent	Boca Raton, Florida	31	**Dogs**	26	4. Songs About Places – Jasper defeats Kat (Ep. 1)	1	N/A	Episode 1
Christian Poole	Merchandiser	Bozeman, Montana	21	**Popular Books**	25	5. Popular Books – Jasper defeats Christian (Ep. 1)	1	N/A	Episode 1
Zane Riley	Stunt Person	Charlotte, North Carolina	39	**Slogans**	18	6. Slogans – Jasper defeats Zane (Ep. 1)	1	N/A	Episode 1
Josh Gordon	Travel Consultant	Cooper City, Florida	46	**Rock Stars**	17	7. Dogs – Jasper defeats Josh (Ep. 1)	1	N/A	Episode 1
Krystal McElveen	Rehabilitation Coordinator	Lynchburg, South Carolina	27	**Fast Food**	20	8. Fashion Brands – Hannah defeats Krystal (Ep. 2)	1	N/A	Episode 2
Darin Corbin	Pro Wrestler	Crystal, Minnesota	39	**Cereals**	33	9. Veggies – Greg defeats Darin (Ep. 2)	1	N/A	Episode 2
Charles Cardwell	College Teacher	Orlando, Florida	43	**Toys**	53	10. Toys – Tom defeats Charles (Ep. 2)	1	N/A	Episode 2
Natalia Class	Event Producer	Orlando, Florida	26	**A-Listers**; Bugs	71	3. A-Listers – Natalia defeats Tory (Ep. 1); 11. Bugs – Tom defeats Natalia (Ep. 2)	2	N/A	Episode 2
Greg Burns	Insurance Adjuster/Appraiser	Bridgeport, Connecticut	59	**Cars**; Veggies; Cereals	44	2. Cars – Greg defeats Zai (Ep. 1); 9. Veggies – Greg defeats Darin (Ep. 2); 12. Cereals – Tom defeats Greg (Ep. 2)	3	N/A	Episode 2
Anne Bradley	Artist/Photographer	Fargo, North Dakota	48	**Musicals**	10	13. TV Hosts – Jacquelyn defeats Anne (Ep. 2)	1	N/A	Episode 2
Kevin Duplan	Photographer	Miami, Florida	35	**Sci-Fi**	35	14. Bands – Tom defeats Kevin (Ep. 2)	1	N/A	Episode 2
Adinah Bolden	Artist	Los Angeles, California	28	**Horror Movies**	54	15. Sci-Fi – Tom defeats Adinah (Ep. 2)	1	N/A	Episode 2
Brittany Skinner	Realtor	Philadelphia, Pennsylvania	38	**International Foods**	1	16. Musicals – Jacquelyn defeats Brittany (Ep. 3)	1	N/A	Episode 3
Nichole Gerl	Semiconductor Technician	Plymouth, Minnesota	44	**Country Music**	65	17. Cartoons – Alahna defeats Nichole (Ep. 3)	1	N/A	Episode 3
Moriah N. Boone	Brand Ambassador	Prescott, Arizona	30	**Medical Devices**	55	18. Medical Devices – Alahna defeats Moriah (Ep. 3)	1	N/A	Episode 3
Tom Courtney	Tour Guide	Philadelphia, Pennsylvania	38	**Bands**; Sci-Fi; Horror Movies	62	10. Toys – Tom defeats Charles (Ep. 2); 11. Bugs – Tom defeats Natalia (Ep. 2); 12. Cereals – Tom defeats Greg (Ep. 2); 14. Bands – Tom defeats Kevin (Ep. 2); 15. Sci-Fi – Tom defeats Adinah (Ep. 2); 19. Horror Movies – Stephanie defeats Tom (Ep. 3)	6	Episode 2; 10 spaces ($20,000)	Episode 3
Zennie Trieu	Director of Operations	New York City	28	**Oscar Winners**	3	20. Oscar Winners – Jennifer defeats Zennie (Ep. 3)	1	N/A	Episode 3
Jennifer Freeman	non-profit Director	Charlotte, North Carolina	39	**Spices & Condiments**	4	20. Oscar Winners – Jennifer defeats Zennie (Ep. 3); 21. College Teams – Sean defeats Jennifer (Ep. 3)	2	N/A	Episode 3
Sean Laird	Engineer	Miami, Florida	39	**College Teams**; Spices & Condiments	2	21. College Teams – Sean defeats Jennifer (Ep. 3); 22. Moguls – James defeats Sean (Ep. 3)	2	N/A	Episode 3
James McNamara	Technical Writer	Portland, Oregon	38	**Moguls**; Spices & Condiments	5	22. Moguls – James defeats Sean (Ep. 3); 23. Famous Sidekicks – Liz defeats James (Ep. 3)	2	N/A	Episode 3
Eugene Torres	Stand-Up Comedian	Orlando, Florida	32	**Junk Drawer Items**	12	24. Junk Drawer Items – Liz defeats Eugene (Ep. 4)	1	N/A	Episode 4
Elizabeth "Liz" Fleming	Business Owner	Des Moines, Iowa	28	**Famous Sidekicks**; Spices & Condiments	13	23. Famous Sidekicks – Liz defeats James (Ep. 3); 24. Junk Drawer Items – Liz defeats Eugene (Ep. 4); 25. Technology – Steve defeats Liz (Ep. 4)	3	N/A	Episode 4
Mondo Davis	Teacher	Atlanta, Georgia	37	**Idioms**	22	26. Idioms – Steve defeats Mondo (Ep. 4)	1	N/A	Episode 4
Dani Grace	Massage Therapist	Leander, Texas	43	**Birds**	41	27. Brunch – Stephanie defeats Dani (Ep. 4)	1	N/A	Episode 4
Sarah Hernandez	Assistant Principal	Austin, Texas	34	**Celebrities on The Simpsons**	15	28. Tourist Hotspots – Victoria defeats Sarah (Ep. 4)	1	N/A	Episode 4
Victoria Haneman	Law Professor	Omaha, Nebraska	46	**Tourist Hotspots**; Celebrities on The Simpsons	14	28. Tourist Hotspots – Victoria defeats Sarah (Ep. 4); 29. Spices and Condiments – Steve defeats Victoria (Ep. 4)	2	N/A	Episode 4
Will Odum	Broadcasting Producer	Marietta, Georgia	26	**Sports Equipment**	16	30. Sports Equipment – Steve defeats Will (Ep. 4)	1	N/A	Episode 4
Lucas Hamilton	Fitness Trainer	Scranton, Pennsylvania	28	**Movie Quotes**	31	31. Movie Quotes – Steve defeats Lucas (Ep. 4)	1	N/A	Episode 4
Michele Guzy	Hypnotherapist	Anchorage, Alaska	56	**Famous Animals**	38	32. Famous Animals – Ford defeats Michelle (Ep. 5)	1	N/A	Episode 5
Hannah Johnson	Health Professional	Kennebunk, Maine	23	**Fashion Brands**; Fast Food	29	8. Fashion Brands – Hannah defeats Krystal (Ep. 2); 33. Fast Food – Ford defeats Hannah (Ep. 5)	2	N/A	Episode 5
Ross Murakami	Musician	Jackson, Mississippi	27	**Divas**	74	34. Divas – Luis defeats Ross (Ep. 5)	1	N/A	Episode 5
Luis Diaz	Standup Comic	Miami, Florida	29	**Snacks**	73	34. Divas – Luis defeats Ross (Ep. 5); 35. Candy – Kaylee defeats Luis (Ep. 5)	2	N/A	Episode 5
Steve Toffler	Media Sales Executive	Edwards, Colorado	59	**Technology**; Spices & Condiments; Celebrities on The Simpsons	11	25. Technology – Steve defeats Liz (Ep. 4); 26. Idioms – Steve defeats Mondo (Ep. 4); 29. Spices and Condiments – Steve defeats Victoria (Ep. 4); 30. Sports Equipment – Steve defeats Will (Ep. 4); 31. Movie Quotes – Steve defeats Lucas (Ep. 4); 36. Celebrities on the Simpsons – Sunnie defeats Steve (Ep. 5)	6	Split Episode 4; 12 spaces ($10,000)	Episode 5
Alayna Maberry	School Teacher	New Orleans, Louisiana	42	**Kids' Books**	70	37. Birds – Stephanie defeats Alayna (Ep. 5)	1	N/A	Episode 5
Pasquale Guiducci	Yoga Instructor	Colonia, New Jersey	32	**Bathroom Items**	67	38. Child Stars – Cheryl defeats Pasquale (Ep. 5)	1	N/A	Episode 5
Khalil LeSaldo	Stage Actor	Philadelphia, Pennsylvania	33	**Mobile Apps**	49	39. Mobile Apps – Cheryl defeats Khalil (Ep. 5)	1	N/A	Episode 5
Mark Francis	Retired	Scranton, Pennsylvania	57	**U.S. States**	72	40. Political Candidates – Lindsey defeats Mark (Ep. 6)	1	N/A	Episode 6
Sarah Sherry	Interior Designer	Nashville, Tennessee	33	**Drinks**	63	41. Children's Books – Stephanie defeats Sarah (Ep. 6)	1	N/A	Episode 6
Mark Morse	Marketing Director	Cincinnati, Ohio	47	**BBQ**	8	42. Rock Stars – Jasper defeats Mark M (Ep. 6)	1	N/A	Episode 6
Jasper Hutson	Tutor	Kansas City, Kansas	25	**Songs About Places**; Dogs; Rock Stars; BBQ	27	4. Songs About Places – Jasper defeats Kat (Ep. 1); 5. Popular Books – Jasper defeats Christian (Ep. 1); 6. Slogans – Jasper defeats Zane (Ep. 1); 7. Dogs – Jasper defeats Josh (Ep. 1); 42. Rock Stars – Jasper defeats Mark M (Ep. 6); 43. Nepo Babies – Anne defeats Jasper (Ep. 6)	6	Episode 1; 5 spaces ($20,000)	Episode 6
Cher Checchio	Editor	Atlanta, Georgia	37	**Child Stars**; Bathroom Items	58	38. Child Stars – Cheryl defeats Pasquale (Ep. 5); 39. Mobile Apps – Cheryl defeats Khalil (Ep. 5); 44. Bathroom Items – Joey defeats Cheryl (Ep. 6)	3	N/A	Episode 6
Tommy Mach	Engineer	Chicago, Illinois	48	**Space**	40	45. Space – Joey defeats Tommy (Ep. 6)	1	N/A	Episode 6
Sunnie Allen	Recruiter	Austin, Texas	40	**Desserts**	30	36. Celebrities on the Simpsons – Sunnie defeats Steve (Ep. 5); 46. Desserts – Joey defeats Sunnie (Ep. 6)	2	Split Episode 5; 13 spaces ($10,000)	Episode 6
Ford Torney	Consultant	Baltimore, Maryland	30	**Clothing & Accessories**	47	32. Famous Animals – Ford defeats Michelle (Ep. 5); 33. Fast Food – Ford defeats Hannah (Ep. 5); 47. Clothing & Accessories – Joey defeats Ford (Ep. 6)	3	N/A	Episode 6
David Cruz	Maintenance Worker	New York City	45	**Famous Hair**	24	48. Wild Animals – Joey defeats David (Ep. 7)	1	N/A	Episode 7
David Walthew	Skin Care Manager	Seattle, Washington	53	**One Hit Wonders**	45	49. Drinks – Stephanie defeats David (Ep. 7)	1	N/A	Episode 7
Stephanie Ross	Retail/Restaurant Manager	San Antonio, Texas	40	**Brunch**; Birds; Kids' Books; Drinks; One Hit Wonders	36	19. Horror Movies – Stephanie defeats Tom (Ep. 3); 27. Brunch – Stephanie defeats Dani (Ep. 4); 37. Birds – Stephanie defeats Alayna (Ep. 5); 41. Children's Books – Stephanie defeats Sarah (Ep. 6); 49. Drinks – Stephanie defeats David (Ep. 7); 50. BBQ – Anne defeats Stephanie (Ep. 7)	6	Episode 3; 11 spaces Split Episode 4; 12 spaces Split Episode 5; 13 spaces ($40,000)	Episode 7
Adam Speas	Creative Director	LaGrange, Georgia	37	**Reality TV**	7	51. Reality TV – Anne defeats Adam (Ep. 7)	1	N/A	Episode 7
Anne McLuckie	Marketing Consultant	Kansas City, Kansas	33	**Nepo Babies**; BBQ; One Hit Wonders	34	43. Nepo Babies – Anne defeats Jasper (Ep. 6); 50. BBQ – Anne defeats Stephanie (Ep. 7); 51. Reality TV – Anne defeats Adam (Ep. 7); 52. Comedians – Gene defeats Anne (Ep. 7)	4	N/A	Episode 7
Joey Lynn	Social Media Specialist	Temecula, California	23	**Wild Animals**; Famous Hair	57	44. Bathroom Items – Joey defeats Cheryl (Ep. 6); 45. Space – Joey defeats Tommy (Ep. 6); 46. Desserts – Joey defeats Sunnie (Ep. 6); 47. Clothing & Accessories – Joey defeats Ford (Ep. 6); 48. Wild Animals – Joey defeats David (Ep. 7); 53. Famous Hair – Angie defeats Joey (Ep. 7)	6	Episode 6; 22 spaces ($20,000)	Episode 7
Angie Liuzza	Advertising and Marketing	Austin, Texas	53	**Transportation**	21	53. Famous Hair – Angie defeats Joey (Ep. 7); 54. Transportation – Gabriel defeats Angie (Ep. 7)	2	N/A	Episode 7
Michael	Sales Manager	Miami, Florida	34	**Shoes**	68	55. Shoes – Claire defeats Michael (Ep. 7)	1	N/A	Episode 7
Chris Sumlin	Social Media Coordinator	Phoenix, Arizona	29	**The Human Body**	59	56. Fruits – Gabriel defeats Chris (Ep. 7)	1	N/A	Episode 7
John Hagner	Political Consultant	Minneapolis, Minnesota	43	**World Capitals**	60	57. Human Body – Gabriel defeats John (Ep. 8)	1	N/A	Episode 8
Joel Noel Tinjaca	Drag Queen	Los Angeles, California	29	**Flags**	37	58. World Capitals – Gabriel defeats Joel (Ep. 8)	1	N/A	Episode 8
Gabriel Coleman	PhD Student	Northfield, Minnesota	28	**Fruits**; The Human Body; World Capitals; Flags	48	54. Transportation – Gabriel defeats Angie (Ep. 7); 56. Fruits – Gabriel defeats Chris (Ep. 7); 57. Human Body – Gabriel defeats John (Ep. 8); 58. World Capitals – Gabriel defeats Joel (Ep. 8); 59. Musical Instruments – Nicholas defeats Gabriel (Ep. 8)	5	Episode 7; 26 spaces ($20,000)	Episode 8
Michael Stahler	Tour Guide	Philadelphia, Pennsylvania	26	**Historic Headlines**	39	60. Flags – Nicholas defeats Michael (Ep. 8)	1	N/A	Episode 8
Laphea Coleman	Editor	Schenectady, New York	28	**Kitchenware**	28	61. Historic Headlines – Nicholas defeats Laphea (Ep. 8)	1	N/A	Episode 8
Andrew Trotter	Real Estate Agent	Bunnell, Florida	43	**History Makers**	76	62. History Makers – Nicholas defeats Andrew (Ep. 8)	1	N/A	Episode 8
Austin Williams	Fitness Trainer	Los Angeles, California	33	**Sports Movies**	23	63. Kitchenware – Nicholas defeats Austin (Ep. 8)	1	N/A	Episode 8
Nicholas Sandoval	Chemical Engineering Professor	New Orleans, Louisiana	39	**Instruments**; Flags; Historic Headlines; Kitchenware; Sports Movies	46	59. Musical Instruments – Nicholas defeats Gabriel (Ep. 8); 60. Flags – Nicholas defeats Michael (Ep. 8); 61. Historic Headlines – Nicholas defeats Laphea (Ep. 8); 62. History Makers – Nicholas defeats Andrew (Ep. 8); 63. Kitchenware – Nicholas defeats Austin (Ep. 8); 64. Sports Movies – Matthew defeats Nicholas (Ep. 8)	6	N/A	Episode 8
Jennifer Simmons	High School Drama Teacher	Lexington, South Carolina	41	**Games**	50	65. One Hit Wonders – Gene defeats Jennifer (Ep. 9)	1	N/A	Episode 9
Tiffany	Medical Assistant	Columbus, Georgia	40	**Hip Hop**	9	66. Hip Hop – Gene defeats Tiffany (Ep. 9)	1	N/A	Episode 9
Heidi Glassman	Senior Creative Associate	Las Vegas, Nevada	53	**80s TV**	79	67. 80s TV – Gene defeats Heidi (Ep. 9)	1	N/A	Episode 9
Tim	Business Developer	Baltimore, Maryland	55	**TV Show Locations**	69	68. Geography – Claire defeats Tim (Ep. 9)	1	N/A	Episode 9
Kaylee Williams	Elementary Teacher	Chicago, Illinois	28	**Candy**; Snacks	75	35. Candy – Kaylee defeats Luis (Ep. 5); 69. Snacks – Riley defeats Kaylee (Ep. 9)	2	N/A	Episode 9
Brandon Tucker	Fashion Model	Miami, Florida	38	**Fashion Icons**	52	70. Games – Gene defeats Tucker (Ep. 9)	1	N/A	Episode 9
Dyllan Fernandez	School Communication Manager	Los Angeles, California	31	**Movie Characters**	61	71. Movie Characters – Gene defeats Dyllan (Ep. 9)	1	N/A	Episode 9
Claire Murchison	Plumbing Sales Rep	Oklahoma City, Oklahoma	30	**Geography**; TV Show Locations	77	55. Shoes – Claire defeats Michael (Ep. 7); 68. Geography – Claire defeats Tim (Ep. 9); 72. TV Show Locations – Gene defeats Claire (Ep. 9)	3	N/A	Episode 9
Gene Magee	Theme Park Performer	Orlando, Florida	40	**Comedians**; One Hit Wonders; Games; Fashion Icons	6	52. Comedians – Gene defeats Anne (Ep. 7); 65. One Hit Wonders – Gene defeats Jennifer S (Ep. 9); 66. Hip Hop – Gene defeats Tiffany (Ep. 9); 67. 80s TV – Gene defeats Heidi (Ep. 9); 70. Games – Gene defeats Tucker (Ep. 9); 71. Movie Characters – Gene defeats Dyllan (Ep. 9); 72. TV Show Locations – Gene defeats Claire (Ep. 9); 73. Athletes – Matthew defeats Gene (Ep. 10)	8	N/A	Episode 10
Lindsey Olson	Advertising & Sales	Tacoma, Washington	34	**Political Candidates**; U.S. States	81	40. Political Candidates – Lindsey defeats Mark F (Ep. 6); 74. U.S. States – Matthew defeats Lindsey (Ep. 10)	2	N/A	Episode 10
Kwame Sarfo	Account Executive	Parlin, New Jersey	30	**Olympic Events**	78	75. Olympic Events – Matthew defeats Kwame (Ep. 10)	1	N/A	Episode 10
Matthew Doan	Basketball Coach	Phoenix, Arizona	27	**Athletes**; Fashion Icons	51	64. Sports Movies – Matthew defeats Nicholas (Ep. 8); 73. Athletes – Matthew defeats Gene (Ep. 10); 74. U.S. States – Matthew defeats Lindsey (Ep. 10); 75. Olympic Events – Matthew defeats Kwame (Ep. 10); 76. Best Picture Winners – Arthur defeats Matthew (Ep. 10)	5	Episode 8; 34 spaces ($20,000)	Episode 10
Joanie Ridgway	Emcee and Host	Fort Lauderdale, Florida	50	**Hobbies**	32	77. Hobbies – Arthur defeats Joanie (Ep. 10)	1	N/A	Episode 10
Alahna Socha	Student	Fajardo, Puerto Rico	25	**Cartoons**; Country Music	56	17. Cartoons – Alahna defeats Nichole (Ep. 3); 18. Medical Devices – Alahna defeats Moriah (Ep. 3); 78. Country Music – Arthur defeats Alahna (Ep. 10)	3	N/A	Episode 10
Riley Welsh	Rocket Scientist	Los Angeles, California	36	**Plants**	64	69. Snacks – Riley defeats Kaylee (Ep. 9); 79. Plants – Arthur defeats Riley (Ep. 10)	2	N/A	Episode 10
Arthur Von Werssowetz	Design Manager	Chattanooga, Tennessee	40	**Best Picture Winners**; Fashion Icons	66	76. Best Picture Winners – Arthur defeats Matthew (Ep. 10); 77. Hobbies – Arthur defeats Joanie (Ep. 10); 78. Country Music – Arthur defeats Alahna (Ep. 10); 79. Plants – Arthur defeats Riley (Ep. 10); 80. Fashion Icons – Jacquelyn defeats Arthur (Ep. 10)	5	N/A	Episode 10
Jacquelyn Kenny	Experiential Marketing	New York City	31	**TV Hosts**; Musicals; International Foods	19	13. TV Hosts – Jacquelyn defeats Anne (Ep. 2); 16. Musicals – Jacquelyn defeats Brittany (Ep. 3); 80. Fashion Icons – Jacquelyn defeats Arthur (Ep. 10)	3	**Season Winner** **($250,000)**	

Color key:

This person was the winner
This person was the runner-up
This person won the duel
This person lost the duel
This person did not duel

Standings (Season 1)
Contestant	Game																																																																															
Contestant	Episode 1							Episode 2								Episode 3								Episode 4								Episode 5								Episode 6								Episode 7									Episode 8								Episode 9								Episode 10							
Contestant	1	2	3	4	5	6	7	8	9	10	11	12	13	14	15	16	17	18	19	20	21	22	23	24	25	26	27	28	29	30	31	32	33	34	35	36	37	38	39	40	41	42	43	44	45	46	47	48	49	50	51	52	53	54	55	56	57	58	59	60	61	62	63	64	65	66	67	68	69	70	71	72	73	74	75	76	77	78	79	80
Jacquelyn Kenny													WIN			WIN																																																																**WINNER**
Arthur Von Werssowetz																																																																	WIN	WIN	WIN	WIN	RUNNER-UP											
Riley Welsh																																																																	WIN										OUT					
Alahna Socha																	WIN	WIN																																																												OUT		
Joanie Ridgway																																																																	OUT															
Matthew Doan																																																																WIN									WIN	WIN	WIN	OUT				
Kwame Sarfo																																																																	OUT															
Lindsey Olson																																								WIN																																		OUT						
Gene Magee																																																				WIN													WIN	WIN	WIN			WIN	WIN	WIN	OUT							
Claire Murchison																																																							WIN													WIN				OUT								
Dyllan Fernandez																																																																	OUT															
Brandon Tucker																																																																	OUT															
Kaylee Williams																																			WIN																																		OUT											
Tim																																																																	OUT															
Heidi Glassman																																																																	OUT															
Tiffany																																																																	OUT															
Jennifer Simmons																																																																	OUT															
Nicholas Sandoval																																																											WIN	WIN	WIN	WIN	WIN	OUT																
Austin Williams																																																															OUT																	
Andrew Trotter																																																														OUT																		
Laphea Coleman																																																													OUT																			
Michael Stahler																																																												OUT																				
Gabriel Coleman																																																						WIN		WIN	WIN	WIN	OUT																					
Joel Noel Tinjaca																																																										OUT																						
John Hagner																																																									OUT																							
Chris Sumlin																																																								OUT																								
Michael																																																							OUT																									
Angie Liuzza																																																					WIN	OUT																										
Joey Lynn																																												WIN	WIN	WIN	WIN	WIN					OUT																											
Anne McLuckie																																											WIN							WIN	WIN	OUT																												
Adam Speas																																																			OUT																													
Stephanie Ross																			WIN								WIN										WIN				WIN								WIN	OUT																														
David Walthew																																																	OUT																															
David Cruz																																																OUT																																
Ford Torney																																WIN	WIN														OUT																																	
Sunnie Allen																																				WIN										OUT																																		
Tommy Mach																																													OUT																																			
Cher Checchio																																						WIN	WIN					OUT																																				
Jasper Hutson				WIN	WIN	WIN	WIN																																			WIN	OUT																																					
Mark Morse																																										OUT																																						
Sarah Sherry																																									OUT																																							
Mark Francis																																								OUT																																								
Khalil LeSaldo																																							OUT																																									
Pasquale Guiducci																																						OUT																																										
Alayna Maberry																																					OUT																																											
Steve Toffler																									WIN	WIN			WIN	WIN	WIN					OUT																																												
Luis Diaz																																		WIN	OUT																																													
Ross Murakami																																		OUT																																														
Hannah Johnson								WIN																									OUT																																															
Michele Guzy																																OUT																																																
Lucas Hamilton																															OUT																																																	
Will Odum																														OUT																																																		
Victoria Haneman																												WIN	OUT																																																			
Sarah Hernandez																												OUT																																																				
Dani Grace																											OUT																																																					
Mondo Davis																										OUT																																																						
Elizabeth "Liz" Fleming																							WIN	WIN	OUT																																																							
Eugene Torres																								OUT																																																								
James McNamara																						WIN	OUT																																																									
Sean Laird																					WIN	OUT																																																										
Jennifer Freeman																				WIN	OUT																																																											
Zennie Trieu																				OUT																																																												
Tom Courtney										WIN	WIN	WIN		WIN	WIN				OUT																																																													
Moriah N. Boone																		OUT																																																														
Nichole Gerl																	OUT																																																															
Brittany Skinner																OUT																																																																
Adinah Bolden															OUT																																																																	
Kevin Duplan														OUT																																																																		
Anne Bradley													OUT																																																																			
Greg Burns		WIN							WIN			OUT																																																																				
Natalia Class			WIN								OUT																																																																					
Charles Cardwell										OUT																																																																						
Darin Corbin									OUT																																																																							
Krystal McElveen								OUT																																																																								
Josh Gordon							OUT																																																																									
Zane Riley						OUT																																																																										
Christian Poole					OUT																																																																											
Kat Ross				OUT																																																																												
Tory Jason			OUT																																																																													
Zai Karaha-Petion	WIN	OUT																																																																														
Sid Simone	OUT																																																																															

=== Season 2 ===
Results (Season 2)
Name	Job	City	Age	Category	Space Assignment	Duels	Duels Played	Episodes Won	Exited
Wade Daniel	High School Principal	Kiowa, Oklahoma	58	**School Supplies**	73	1. Farm Life – Marley defeats Wade (Ep. 1)	1	N/A	Episode 1
Joshua Suarez	Lifestyle Influencer	Long Island, New York	28	**Cleaning Brands**	63	2. School Supplies – Marley defeats Joshua (Ep. 1)	1	N/A	Episode 1
Marley A. Gregory	Personal Trainer	Fort Lawn, South Carolina	29	**Farm Life**; School Supplies; Cleaning Brands	83	1. Farm Life – Marley defeats Wade (Ep. 1); 2. School Supplies – Marley defeats Joshua (Ep. 1); 3. Tailgating – Ryan defeats Marley (Ep. 1)	3	N/A	Episode 1
Lisa Paradise	Food Journalist	New York City	34	**Cheese**	25	4. Beauty – Sharday defeats Lisa (Ep. 1)	1	N/A	Episode 1
Maggie Berg	Receptionist	New Orleans, Louisiana	35	**Las Vegas**	59	5. Halloween Costumes – Megan defeats Maggie (Ep. 1)	1	N/A	Episode 1
Josue Ledesma	Marketing Consultant	Miami, Florida	34	**Paintings**	98	6. On Safari – Vanessa defeats Josue (Ep. 1)	1	N/A	Episode 1
Michael Ampaabeng	Student Body/Senior Class President	Minneapolis, Minnesota	30	**Constellations**	87	7. Restaurant Chains – Ali defeats Michael (Ep. 1)	1	N/A	Episode 1
Andrew Villareal	Student	Yonkers, New York	19	**Stocks**	38	8. Stocks – Angie defeats Andrew (Ep. 1)	1	N/A	Episode 1
Will Fulton Jr.	Senior IT Support	Stamford, Connecticut	57	**Acronyms**	28	9. Acronyms – Angie defeats Will (Ep. 2)	1	N/A	Episode 2
Izzy	Dog Walker	Brooklyn, New York	26	**Baked Goods**	37	10. Baked Goods – Angie defeats Izzy (Ep. 2)	1	N/A	Episode 2
Cyrene Tankard	Beauty Content Creator	Washington, D.C.	28	**Blockbuster Movies**	12	11. Pizza Toppings – Landis defeats Cyrene (Ep. 2)	1	N/A	Episode 2
Monica Bhatia	Social Worker	Bartlett, Illinois	33	**Taylor Swift Songs**	29	12. Taylor Swift Songs – Mena defeats Monica (Ep. 2)	1	N/A	Episode 2
Sage Cassidy	Bartender	Deltona, Florida	22	**Professions**	94	13. Professions – Keelan defeats Sage (Ep. 2)	1	N/A	Episode 2
Heather Abood	Corporate DEI Specialist	Orlando, Florida	41	**Sitcoms**	62	14. Sitcoms – Julie Ann defeats Heather (Ep. 2)	1	N/A	Episode 2
Ryan Hoag	Tennis Pro	Minneapolis, Minnesota	44	**Tailgating**; Cleaning Brands	84	3. Tailgating – Ryan defeats Marley (Ep. 1); 15. Cleaning Brands – Julie Ann defeats Ryan (Ep. 2)	2	Episode 1; 4 spaces ($20,000)	Episode 2
Eric Lloyd	Audio Engineer	Glendale, California	38	**Holiday Movies**	56	16. Holiday Movies – Neal defeats Eric (Ep. 2)	1	N/A	Episode 2
Neal E. Fischer	Author	Riverside, Illinois	39	**World Currencies**	57	16. Holiday Movies – Neal defeats Eric (Ep. 2); 17. At The Mall – Chelsey defeats Neal (Ep. 3)	2	N/A	Episode 3
Emily Sopkin	Occupational Therapist	Upland, California	34	**Kids' Shows**	24	18. Cheese – Sharday defeats Emily (Ep. 3)	1	N/A	Episode 3
Kaitlin	Writer	Syosset, New York	32	**News Personalites**	31	19. Smoothies – James defeats Kaitlin (Ep. 3)	1	N/A	Episode 3
Emily Ramirez	Teacher's Aide	Chicago, Illinois	20	**Gen Z**	27	20. Young Adult Novels – Maureen defeats Emily (Ep. 3)	1	N/A	Episode 3
Robert Okereke	Tech Recruiter	New York City	30	**Superstars**	17	21. Superstars – Maureen defeats Robert (Ep. 3)	1	N/A	Episode 3
Maureen Zeufack	Marketing Associate	Potomac, Maryland	22	**Young Adult Novels**; Gen Z	26	20. Young Adult Novels – Maureen defeats Emily (Ep. 3); 21. Superstars – Maureen defeats Robert (Ep. 3); 22. Playbills – Haley defeats Maureen (Ep. 3)	3	N/A	Episode 3
Haley Warden	Ice Rink Director	Cincinnati, Ohio	42	**Playbills**; Gen Z	36	22. Playbills – Haley defeats Maureen (Ep. 3); 23. Recess – Jessica defeats Haley (Ep. 3)	2	N/A	Episode 3
Chris Andrews	Sales Worker	Austin, Texas	40	**Wrestlers**	53	24. Disco – Julie Ann defeats Chris (Ep. 3)	1	N/A	Episode 3
Tudi Wilson	Chef	Dallas, Texas	44	**Daytime TV**	77	25. Game Night – Andrew defeats Tudi (Ep. 3)	1	N/A	Episode 3
Andrew Herkelman	High School Math Teacher	Bradenton, Florida	23	**Game Night**; Daytime TV	67	25. Game Night – Andrew defeats Tudi (Ep. 3); 26. World Currencies – Chelsey defeats Andrew (Ep. 4)	2	N/A	Episode 4
Ben Brassord	Marketing	Amherst, Massachusetts	32	**Brand Mascots**	35	27. Triple Threats – Kara defeats Ben (Ep. 4)	1	N/A	Episode 4
Chelsey Capalad	Healthcare Manager	Chino, California	31	**At The Mall**; World Currencies; Daytime TV	55	17. At The Mall – Chelsey defeats Neal (Ep. 3); 26. World Currencies – Chelsey defeats Andrew (Ep. 4); 28. Daytime TV – Kara defeats Chelsey (Ep. 4)	3	N/A	Episode 4
Jessica Key	Middle School Math Teacher	Mabelvale, Arkansas	40	**Recess**; Gen Z	7	23. Recess – Jessica defeats Haley (Ep. 3); 29. Gen Z – Kara defeats Jessica (Ep. 4)	2	N/A	Episode 4
Morgan Schrankel	High School Teacher	Philadelphia, Pennsylvania	33	**Compound Words**	6	30. Brand Mascots – Kara defeats Morgan (Ep. 4)	1	N/A	Episode 4
Andrew Ketchum	Professional Dodgeball Player	Chandler, Arizona	31	**Ancient Egypt**	96	31. Action Films – Jake defeats Andrew (Ep. 4)	1	N/A	Episode 4
Vanessa Delgado	Communications Manager	Miami, Florida	37	**On Safari**; Paintings	99	6. On Safari – Vanessa defeats Josue (Ep. 1); 32. Paintings – Jake defeats Vanessa (Ep. 4)	2	N/A	Episode 4
Kilah Turner	Quality Control Specialist	Brea, California	34	**Vending Machines**	100	33. Vending Machines – Jake defeats Kilah (Ep. 4)	1	N/A	Episode 4
Jake Young	Comedy Podcaster	Croton-on-Hudson, New York	40	**Action Films**; Ancient Egypt	97	31. Action Films – Jake defeats Andrew (Ep. 4); 32. Paintings – Jake defeats Vanessa (Ep. 4); 33. Vending Machines – Jake defeats Kilah (Ep. 4); 34. Constellations – Ali defeats Jake (Ep. 5)	4	N/A	Episode 5
Emily Sklar	Radio Host	Detroit, Michigan	34	**Musical Instruments** (Audio Duel)	18	35. Compound Words – Kara defeats Emily (Ep. 5)	1	N/A	Episode 5
Ryan Alan Barnett	Program Manager/Singer	Denver, Colorado	44	**Cooking**	69	36. Baseball Logos – Spiro defeats Ryan Alan (Ep. 5)	1	N/A	Episode 5
Kelly Burnette	Customer Support Manager	Hampton, Virginia	36	**Circus**	43	37. Circus – Grace defeats Kelly (Ep. 5)	1	N/A	Episode 5
Tommy Montgomery	Kayak Instructor	New York City	25	**Ocean Animals**	44	38. Ocean Animals – Grace defeats Tommy (Ep. 5)	1	N/A	Episode 5
Grace Piper	Fundraiser	Chicago, Illinois	29	**Pop Stars**	42	37. Circus – Grace defeats Kelly (Ep. 5); 38. Ocean Animals – Grace defeats Tommy (Ep. 5); 39. Coming of Age Movies – Corey defeats Grace (Ep. 5)	3	N/A	Episode 5
Julie Ann "Maday" Weston	Retired Corporate Trainer	Madison, Wisconsin	60	**Disco**; Wrestlers	61	14. Sitcoms – Julie Ann defeats Heather (Ep. 2); 15. Cleaning Brands – Julie Ann defeats Ryan (Ep. 2); 24. Disco – Julie Ann defeats Chris (Ep. 3); 40. Wrestlers – Corey defeats Julie Ann (Ep. 5)	4	Episode 2; 6 spaces Episode 3; 7 spaces ($40,000)	Episode 5
Ronald H. Griffin	Retired Detroit Police Officer	Detroit, Michigan	51	**Carnival Food**	74	41. Carnival Food – Corey defeats Ronald (Ep. 5)	1	N/A	Episode 5
Corey Lueker	Software Designer	Phoenix, Arizona	34	**Coming of Age Movies**; Pop Stars	33	39. Coming of Age Movies – Corey defeats Grace (Ep. 5); 40. Wrestlers – Corey defeats Julie Ann (Ep. 5); 41. Carnival Food – Corey defeats Ronald (Ep. 5); 42. Fitness – Melissa defeats Corey (Ep. 6)	4	N/A	Episode 6
Melissa Sandoval	AD Agency Account Director	Chandler, Arizona	45	**Fitness**; Pop Stars	75	42. Fitness – Melissa defeats Corey (Ep. 6); 43. American Inventions – Anand defeats Melissa (Ep. 6)	2	N/A	Episode 6
Anand Balar	Project Manager	Minneapolis, Minnesota	28	**American Inventions**; Pop Stars	65	43. American Inventions – Anand defeats Melissa (Ep. 6); 44. Star Wars – Mack defeats Anand (Ep. 6)	2	N/A	Episode 6
Carlos	Comedian	Orlando, Florida	64	**Weather**	32	45. Weather – Mack defeats Carlos (Ep. 6)	1	N/A	Episode 6
Landis Tindell	Communications Manager	Oklahoma City, Oklahoma	31	**Pizza Toppings**; Blockbuster Movies	22	11. Pizza Toppings – Landis defeats Cyrene (Ep. 2); 46. Blockbuster Movies – Mack defeats Landis (Ep. 6)	2	N/A	Episode 6
Spiro Hountalas	Retired Sales Exec	Naperville, Illinois	68	**Baseball Logos**; Cooking	70	36. Baseball Logos – Spiro defeats Ryan Alan (Ep. 5); 47. Cooking – Mia defeats Spiro (Ep. 6)	2	N/A	Episode 6
Gregg Rogen	Music Producer	Harlem, New York	57	**National Parks**	1	48. Beach – Nate defeats Gregg (Ep. 6)	1	N/A	Episode 6
Kara Farrell	Crime Analyst	Oyster Bay, New York	38	**Triple Threats**; Brand Mascots; Compound Words; Musical Instruments (Audio Duel)	45	27. Triple Threats – Kara defeats Ben (Ep. 4); 28. Daytime TV – Kara defeats Chelsey (Ep. 4); 29. Gen Z – Kara defeats Jessica (Ep. 4); 30. Brand Mascots – Kara defeats Morgan (Ep. 4); 35. Compound Words – Kara defeats Emily (Ep. 5); 49. Musical Instruments – Trevor defeats Kara (Ep. 6)	6	Episode 4; 13 spaces Episode 5; 14 spaces ($40,000)	Episode 6
Lia Bueno	Entrepreneur	Tucson, Arizona	56	**State Flags**	72	50. Pop Stars – Mack defeats Lia (Ep. 6)	1	N/A	Episode 6
Lauren Ives	Freelance Sales	Brooklyn, New York	34	**The Military**	66	51. The Military – Mack defeats Lauren (Ep. 7)	1	N/A	Episode 7
Mackenzie "Mack" Rote	Cybercrime Investigator	Bothell, Washington	35	**Star Wars**; Pop Stars; State Flags	76	44. Star Wars – Mack defeats Anand (Ep. 6); 45. Weather – Mack defeats Carlos (Ep. 6); 46. Blockbuster Movies – Mack defeats Landis (Ep. 6); 50. Pop Stars – Mack defeats Lia (Ep. 6); 51. The Military – Mack defeats Lauren (Ep. 7); 52. Gems – Paolo defeats Mack (Ep. 7)	6	Episode 6; 19 spaces ($20,000)	Episode 7
Paolo Godcharles-Méndez	Design Associate	New York City	25	**Gems**; State Flags	23	52. Gems – Paolo defeats Mack (Ep. 7); 53. Kids' Shows – Sharday defeats Paolo (Ep. 7)	2	N/A	Episode 7
Talia Wernick	Waitress	Saint Paul, Minnesota	26	**Shakespeare**	52	54. Best Sellers – Jayna defeats Talia (Ep. 7)	1	N/A	Episode 7
Sharday Walker	Cosmetologist	Dallas, Texas	30	**Beauty**; Cheese; Kids' Shows; State Flags	15	4. Beauty – Sharday defeats Lisa (Ep. 1); 18. Cheese – Sharday defeats Emily (Ep. 3); 53. Kids' Shows – Sharday defeats Paolo (Ep. 7); 55. State Flags – Virginia defeats Sharday (Ep. 7)	4	N/A	Episode 7
Trevor Quincy	Artist	Long Island, New York	26	**Holistic Spirituality**	78	49. Musical Instruments – Trevor defeats Kara (Ep. 6); 56. Holistic Spirituality – Virginia defeats Trevor (Ep. 7)	2	N/A	Episode 7
Robby Delwarte	Real Estate Manager	Los Angeles, California	31	**State Capitals**	14	57. State Capitals – Cristian defeats Robby (Ep. 7)	1	N/A	Episode 7
Cristian Harden	Organizational Manager	Denver, Colorado	53	**Do It Yourself**	13	57. State Capitals – Cristian defeats Robby (Ep. 7); 58. Flowers – Virginia defeats Cristian (Ep. 7)	2	N/A	Episode 7
Virginia Giglio	Artist & Musician	Atlanta, Georgia	70	**Flowers**; Do It Yourself	93	55. State Flags – Virginia defeats Sharday (Ep. 7); 56. Holistic Spirituality – Virginia defeats Trevor (Ep. 7); 58. Flowers – Virginia defeats Cristian (Ep. 7); 59. DIY – Jeremy defeats Virginia (Ep. 8)	4	Episode 7; 42 spaces ($20,000)	Episode 8
Holly Linkoski	Data Engineer	Nashville, Tennessee	27	**College Mascots**	40	60. Puppies – Lili defeats Holly (Ep. 8)	1	N/A	Episode 8
Sabrina	Sales	Chino, California	36	**Skylines**	10	61. Skylines – Jennifer defeats Sabrina (Ep. 8)	1	N/A	Episode 8
Mia Palombo	Doctoral Student	Wakefield, Rhode Island	28	**World History**	80	47. Cooking – Mia defeats Spiro (Ep. 6); 62. World History – Austin defeats Mia (Ep. 8)	2	N/A	Episode 8
Paul J. Lucero	Actor	New York City	32	**New York**	90	63. New York – Austin defeats Paul (Ep. 8)	1	N/A	Episode 8
Austin Jones	Product Designer	Lapel, Indiana	31	**Failed Political Candidates**	79	62. World History – Austin defeats Mia (Ep. 8); 63. New York – Austin defeats Paul (Ep. 8); 64. Animal Sounds – Danny defeats Austin (Ep. 8)	3	N/A	Episode 8
Zuri Pryor-Graves	Intimacy Coordinator	Roanoke, Virginia	36	**Female Athletes**	68	65. Female Athletes – Danny defeats Zuri (Ep. 8)	1	N/A	Episode 8
Jeremy Dionisio	Teacher	Chicago, Illinois	43	**Alternative Music**	34	59. DIY – Jeremy defeats Virginia (Ep. 8); 66. Alternative Music – Danny defeats Jeremy (Ep. 8)	2	N/A	Episode 8
Sydney Horen	Event Planner	Seattle, Washington	25	**Autumn**	50	67. Autumn – Michael defeats Sydney (Ep. 9)	1	N/A	Episode 9
Alicia Silverthorn	Leasing Agent	Philadelphia, Pennsylvania	27	**Medieval Times**	21	68. Car Parts – Paul defeats Alicia (Ep. 9)	1	N/A	Episode 9
Danny Snider	Musician	Los Angeles, California	25	**Halloween Movies**	8	69. Failed Political Candidates – Danny defeats Danny (Ep. 9)	1	N/A	Episode 9
Amy Wilkinson	Nanny	Michigan City, Indiana	29	**Nursery Rhymes**	47	70. Extreme Sports – Tim defeats Amy (Ep. 9)	1	N/A	Episode 9
Timothy "Tim" Leung	Technical Teacher	Madison, Wisconsin	48	**Extreme Sports**; Nursery Rhymes	46	70. Extreme Sports – Tim defeats Amy (Ep. 9); 71. Halloween Movies – Danny defeats Tim (Ep. 9)	2	N/A	Episode 9
Lisa Paul	Spy Company SVP	Laguna Niguel, California	53	**R&B**	91	72. Global Monuments – Alex defeats Lisa (Ep. 9)	1	N/A	Episode 9
Sarah Russo	Pharmacist	Whitman, Massachusetts	46	**Female Leaders**	86	73. Female Leaders – Jessica defeats Sarah (Ep. 9)	1	N/A	Episode 9
Danny Gomez	Airport Traffic Officer	Miami, Florida	43	**Animal Sounds** (Audio Duel); Failed Political Candidates; Halloween Movies; Nursery Rhymes	89	64. Animal Sounds – Danny defeats Austin (Ep. 8); 65. Female Athletes – Danny defeats Zuri (Ep. 8); 66. Alternative Music – Danny defeats Jeremy (Ep. 8); 69. Failed Political Candidates – Danny defeats Danny (Ep. 9); 71. Halloween Movies – Danny defeats Tim (Ep. 9); 74. Nursery Rhymes – Jessica defeats Danny (Ep. 9)	6	Episode 8; 50 spaces ($20,000)	Episode 9
Joanna McNurlen	Tech Sales	New York City	34	**CEOs**	19	75. Beans – Jennifer defeats Joanna (Ep. 9)	1	N/A	Episode 9
David Goldweitz	Accountant	Miami, Florida	68	**American History**	20	76. American History – Jennifer defeats David (Ep. 10)	1	N/A	Episode 10
Trenton Wayne	Analyst	Long Island, New York	26	**Lab Equipment**	54	77. Hockey – Catherine defeats Trenton (Ep. 10)	1	N/A	Episode 10
Cassandra Davis	Marketing	Worcester, Massachusetts	39	**Reality TV Stars**	4	78. Reality TV Stars – Kevin defeats Cassandra (Ep. 10)	1	N/A	Episode 10
Brandi Ferguson	Voice Over Artist	Seattle, Washington	51	**Spinoff Bands**	5	79. Girl Groups – Jessica defeats Brandi (Ep. 10)	1	N/A	Episode 10
Alex Chacón	Photographer	El Paso, Texas	36	**Global Monuments**; R&B	92	72. Global Monuments – Alex defeats Lisa (Ep. 9); 80. R&B – Jessica defeats Alex (Ep. 10)	2	N/A	Episode 10
Jessica Lesaca	Lifestyle Content Creator	Los Angeles, California	36	**Girl Groups**; Spinoff Bands	85	73. Female Leaders – Jessica defeats Sarah (Ep. 9); 74. Nursery Rhymes – Jessica defeats Danny (Ep. 9); 79. Girl Groups – Jessica defeats Brandi (Ep. 10); 80. R&B – Jessica defeats Alex (Ep. 10); 81. Disney Characters – Rita defeats Jessica (Ep. 10)	5	Episode 9; 55 spaces ($20,000)	Episode 10
Rita Castagna	Barista	Philadelphia, Pennsylvania	27	**Disney Characters**; Spinoff Bands	82	81. Disney Characters – Rita defeats Jessica (Ep. 10); 82. Ancient Egypt – Ali defeats Rita (Ep. 10)	2	N/A	Episode 10
Bryan Cuan-Garcia	A/V Professional	Orlando, Florida	35	**Beer**	71	83. Beer – Nery defeats Bryan (Ep. 10)	1	N/A	Episode 10
Ali Johnson	Social Media Marketer	Mesa, Arizona	25	**Restaurant Chains**; Constellations; Ancient Egypt; Spinoff Bands	88	7. Restaurant Chains – Ali defeats Michael (Ep. 1); 34. Constellations – Ali defeats Jake (Ep. 5); 82. Ancient Egypt – Ali defeats Rita (Ep. 10); 84. Spinoff Bands – Dan defeats Ali (Ep. 11)	4	Episode 10; 66 spaces ($20,000)	Episode 11
Daniel "Dan" Avila	Retired Sports Photographer	Los Angeles, California	74	**Game Show Hosts**	16	84. Spinoff Bands – Dan defeats Ali (Ep. 11); 85. British Invasion – Mick defeats Dan (Ep. 11)	2	N/A	Episode 11
Mick	Retired Desalination Engineer	Plantation, Florida	75	**British Invasion**; Game Show Hosts	58	85. British Invasion – Mick defeats Dan (Ep. 11); 86. Medieval Times – Paul defeats Mick (Ep. 11)	2	N/A	Episode 11
Paul Roseberry	Relationship Coach	Portsmouth, New Hampshire	45	**Car Parts**; Medieval Times; Game Show Hosts	11	68. Car Parts – Paul defeats Alicia (Ep. 9); 86. Medieval Times – Paul defeats Mick (Ep. 11); 87. Las Vegas – Megan defeats Paul (Ep. 11)	3	N/A	Episode 11
Megan Nybakk	Program Coordinator	Los Angeles, California	27	**Halloween Costumes**; Las Vegas; Game Show Hosts	49	5. Halloween Costumes – Megan defeats Maggie (Ep. 1); 87. Las Vegas – Megan defeats Paul (Ep. 11); 88. Art Supplies – Kevin defeats Megan (Ep. 11)	3	N/A	Episode 11
Lili Gutierrez	Spa Owner	El Paso, Texas	54	**Puppies**; College Mascots	39	60. Puppies – Lili defeats Holly (Ep. 8); 89. College Mascots – Kevin defeats Lili (Ep. 11)	2	N/A	Episode 11
Nery Saenz	Comedian	Miami, Florida	42	**Stand-Up Comedians**	81	83. Beer – Nery defeats Bryan (Ep. 10); 90. Stand-Up Comedians – Kevin defeats Nery (Ep. 11)	2	N/A	Episode 11
James McQueen	Choreographer	Atlanta, Georgia	33	**Smoothies**; News Personalites	41	19. Smoothies – James defeats Kaitlin (Ep. 3); 91. News Personalities – Kevin defeats James (Ep. 11)	2	N/A	Episode 11
Mena Han-Lalime	Jewelry Stylist	Damariscotta, Maine	25	**Accessories**	30	12. Taylor Swift Songs – Mena defeats Monica (Ep. 2); 92. Based on a True Story – Angie defeats Mena (Ep. 12)	2	N/A	Episode 12
Kevin Rilea	Finance Manager	Madison, Wisconsin	33	**Art Supplies**; Game Show Hosts	3	78. Reality TV Stars – Kevin defeats Cassandra (Ep. 10); 88. Art Supplies – Kevin defeats Megan (Ep. 11); 89. College Mascots – Kevin defeats Lili (Ep. 11); 90. Stand-Up Comedians – Kevin defeats Nery (Ep. 11); 91. News Personalities – Kevin defeats James (Ep. 11); 93. Game Show Hosts – Angie defeats Kevin (Ep. 12)	6	Episode 11; 80 spaces ($20,000)	Episode 12
Angie Warfield	English Professor	Glendale, Missouri	50	**Based on a True Story**; Accessories	48	8. Stocks – Angie defeats Andrew (Ep. 1); 9. Acronyms – Angie defeats Will (Ep. 2); 10. Baked Goods – Angie defeats Izzy (Ep. 2); 92. Based on a True Story – Angie defeats Mena (Ep. 12); 93. Game Show Hosts – Angie defeats Kevin (Ep. 12); 94. Accessories – Jayna defeats Angie (Ep. 12)	6	N/A	Episode 12
Jayna Carden	Stage Manager	Chicago, Illinois	25	**Best Sellers**; Shakespeare	51	54. Best Sellers – Jayna defeats Talia (Ep. 7); 94. Accessories – Jayna defeats Angie (Ep. 12); 95. National Parks – Nate defeats Jayna (Ep. 12)	3	N/A	Episode 12
Nate Marcum	Restoration GM	Costa Mesa, California	44	**Beach**; National Parks; Shakespeare	2	48. Beach – Nate defeats Gregg (Ep. 6); 95. National Parks – Nate defeats Jayna (Ep. 12); 96. Lab Equipment – Catherine defeats Nate (Ep. 12)	3	N/A	Episode 12
Michael Craig	Retail Manager	Beaverton, Oregon	37	**Sneakers**	60	67. Autumn – Michael defeats Sydney (Ep. 9); 97. Shakespeare – Catherine defeats Michael (Ep. 12)	2	N/A	Episode 12
Catherine Eng	Tutor	Rancho Cucamonga, California	26	**Hockey**; Lab Equipment; Shakespeare; Sneakers	64	77. Hockey – Catherine defeats Trenton (Ep. 10); 96. Lab Equipment – Catherine defeats Nate (Ep. 12); 97. Shakespeare – Catherine defeats Michael (Ep. 12); 98. Sneakers – Jennifer defeats Catherine (Ep. 12)	4	N/A	Episode 12
Jennifer Strickland	High School Teacher	Watkinsville, Georgia	53	**Beans**; CEOs	9	61. Skylines – Jennifer defeats Sabrina (Ep. 8); 75. Beans – Jennifer defeats Joanna (Ep. 9); 76. American History – Jennifer defeats David (Ep. 10); 98. Sneakers – Jennifer defeats Catherine (Ep. 12); 99. Periodic Table – Keelan defeats Jennifer (0–1) (Ep. 12); 100. CEOs – Keelan defeats Jennifer (0–2) (Ep. 12)	6	N/A	Episode 12
Keelan von Ehrenkrook	Special Education Teacher	Davis, California	25	**Periodic Table**	95	13. Professions – Keelan defeats Sage (Ep. 2); 99. Periodic Table – Keelan defeats Jennifer (1–0) (Ep. 12); 100. CEOs – Keelan defeats Jennifer (2–0) (Ep. 12)	3	**Season Winner** **($250,000)**	

Color key:

This person was the winner
This person was the runner-up
This person won the duel
This person won the duel and the Time Boost
This person, who used the Time Boost, won the duel
This person lost the duel
This person, who used the Time Boost, lost the duel
This person did not duel

Standings (Season 2)
Contestant	Game																																																																																																			
Contestant	Episode 1								Episode 2								Episode 3									Episode 4								Episode 5								Episode 6									Episode 7								Episode 8								Episode 9									Episode 10								Episode 11								Episode 12								
Contestant	1	2	3	4	5	6	7	8	9	10	11	12	13	14	15	16	17	18	19	20	21	22	23	24	25	26	27	28	29	30	31	32	33	34	35	36	37	38	39	40	41	42	43	44	45	46	47	48	49	50	51	52	53	54	55	56	57	58	59	60	61	62	63	64	65	66	67	68	69	70	71	72	73	74	75	76	77	78	79	80	81	82	83	84	85	86	87	88	89	90	91	92	93	94	95	96	97	98	99	100
Keelan von Ehrenkrook													WIN																																																																	WIN	**WINNER**																					
Jennifer Strickland																																																													WIN														WIN	WIN																						WIN	LOSE	RUNNER-UP
Catherine Eng																																																																	WIN																			WIN	WIN	OUT														
Michael Craig																																																																	WIN																														OUT					
Nate Marcum																																																WIN																																															WIN	OUT				
Jayna Carden																																																						WIN																																								WIN	OUT					
Angie Warfield								WIN	WIN	WIN																																																																	WIN	WIN	OUT																							
Kevin Rilea																																																																	WIN										WIN	WIN	WIN	WIN		OUT																				
Mena Han-Lalime												WIN																																																																	OUT																							
James McQueen																			WIN																																																																	OUT																
Nery Saenz																																																																	WIN							OUT																												
Lili Gutierrez																																																												WIN																													OUT											
Megan Nybakk					WIN																																																																	WIN	OUT																													
Paul Roseberry																																																																	WIN																		WIN	OUT																
Mick																																																																	WIN	OUT																																		
Daniel "Dan" Avila																																																																	WIN	OUT																																		
Ali Johnson							WIN																											WIN																																																WIN		OUT																
Bryan Cuan-Garcia																																																																	OUT																																			
Rita Castagna																																																																	WIN	OUT																																		
Jessica Lesaca																																																																	WIN	WIN					WIN	WIN	OUT																											
Alex Chacón																																																																	WIN								OUT																											
Brandi Ferguson																																																																	OUT																																			
Cassandra Davis																																																																	OUT																																			
Trenton Wayne																																																																	OUT																																			
David Goldweitz																																																																	OUT																																			
Joanna McNurlen																																																																	OUT																																			
Danny Gomez																																																																WIN	WIN	WIN			WIN		WIN			OUT																										
Sarah Russo																																																																	OUT																																			
Lisa Paul																																																																	OUT																																			
Timothy "Tim" Leung																																																																	WIN	OUT																																		
Amy Wilkinson																																																																	OUT																																			
Danny Snider																																																																	OUT																																			
Alicia Silverthorn																																																																	OUT																																			
Sydney Horen																																																																	OUT																																			
Jeremy Dionisio																																																											WIN							OUT																																		
Zuri Pryor-Graves																																																																	OUT																																			
Austin Jones																																																														WIN	WIN	OUT																																				
Paul J. Lucero																																																															OUT																																					
Mia Palombo																																															WIN															OUT																																						
Sabrina																																																													OUT																																							
Holly Linkoski																																																												OUT																																								
Virginia Giglio																																																							WIN	WIN		WIN	OUT																																									
Cristian Harden																																																									WIN	OUT																																										
Robby Delwarte																																																									OUT																																											
Trevor Quincy																																																	WIN							OUT																																												
Sharday Walker				WIN														WIN																																			WIN		OUT																																													
Talia Wernick																																																						OUT																																														
Paolo Godcharles-Méndez																																																				WIN	OUT																																															
Mackenzie "Mack" Rote																																												WIN	WIN	WIN				WIN	WIN	OUT																																																
Lauren Ives																																																			OUT																																																	
Lia Bueno																																																		OUT																																																		
Kara Farrell																											WIN	WIN	WIN	WIN					WIN														OUT																																																			
Gregg Rogen																																																OUT																																																				
Spiro Hountalas																																				WIN											OUT																																																					
Landis Tindell											WIN																																			OUT																																																						
Carlos																																													OUT																																																							
Anand Balar																																											WIN	OUT																																																								
Melissa Sandoval																																										WIN	OUT																																																									
Corey Lueker																																							WIN	WIN	WIN	OUT																																																										
Ronald H. Griffin																																									OUT																																																											
Julie Ann "Maday" Weston														WIN	WIN									WIN																OUT																																																												
Grace Piper																																					WIN	WIN	OUT																																																													
Tommy Montgomery																																						OUT																																																														
Kelly Burnette																																					OUT																																																															
Ryan Alan Barnett																																				OUT																																																																
Emily Sklar																																			OUT																																																																	
Jake Young																															WIN	WIN	WIN	OUT																																																																		
Kilah Turner																																	OUT																																																																			
Vanessa Delgado						WIN																										OUT																																																																				
Andrew Ketchum																															OUT																																																																					
Morgan Schrankel																														OUT																																																																						
Jessica Key																							WIN						OUT																																																																							
Chelsey Capalad																	WIN									WIN		OUT																																																																								
Ben Brassord																											OUT																																																																									
Andrew Herkelman																									WIN	OUT																																																																										
Tudi Wilson																									OUT																																																																											
Chris Andrews																								OUT																																																																												
Haley Warden																						WIN	OUT																																																																													
Maureen Zeufack																				WIN	WIN	OUT																																																																														
Robert Okereke																					OUT																																																																															
Emily Ramirez																				OUT																																																																																
Kaitlin																			OUT																																																																																	
Emily Sopkin																		OUT																																																																																		
Neal E. Fischer																WIN	OUT																																																																																			
Eric Lloyd																OUT																																																																																				
Ryan Hoag			WIN												OUT																																																																																					
Heather Abood														OUT																																																																																						
Sage Cassidy													OUT																																																																																							
Monica Bhatia												OUT																																																																																								
Cyrene Tankard											OUT																																																																																									
Izzy										OUT																																																																																										
Will Fulton Jr.									OUT																																																																																											
Andrew Villareal								OUT																																																																																												
Michael Ampaabeng							OUT																																																																																													
Josue Ledesma						OUT																																																																																														
Maggie Berg					OUT																																																																																															
Lisa Paradise				OUT																																																																																																
Marley A. Gregory	WIN	WIN	OUT																																																																																																	
Joshua Suarez		OUT																																																																																																		
Wade Daniel	OUT																																																																																																			

=== Season 3 ===
Results (Season 3)
Name	Job	City	Age	Category	Space Assignment	Duels	Duels Played	Episodes Won	Exited
Jamella Usman	Real Estate Student	Chicago, Illinois	30	**Pantry Items**	57	1. Pantry Items – Lisa defeats Jamella (Ep. 1)	1	N/A	Episode 1
Dayna Marie	Lifestyle Influencer	Los Angeles, California	24	**Pets**	69	2. Pets – Madeline defeats Dayna (Ep. 1)	1	N/A	Episode 1
Carli Michelle	Special Ed Teacher	Baltimore, Maryland	25	**Ancient History**	79	3. Ancient History – Madeline defeats Carli (Ep. 1)	1	N/A	Episode 1
Hennessy Williams III	Comedian	Boynton Beach, Florida	35	**Islands** (Association Duel)	93	4. Mountains – Mike defeats Hennessy (Ep. 1)	1	N/A	Episode 1
Jordan Sweet	Model	Chicago, Illinois	23	**Classic Films**	89	5. Home Decor – Logan defeats Jordan (Ep. 1)	1	N/A	Episode 1
Nikki Santos	Public Health Scientist	Washington, D.C.	32	**Gardening**	88	6. Gardening – Logan defeats Nikki (Ep. 1)	1	N/A	Episode 1
Noell Allen	Public Servant	Indianapolis, Indiana	43	**Children's Literature**	87	7. Children's Literature – Logan defeats Noell (Ep. 1)	1	N/A	Episode 1
Hajira Sultana	Substitute Teacher	Chicago, Illinois	25	**Airport Codes**	21	8. Ice Cream Flavors – Dara defeats Haji (Ep. 1)	1	N/A	Episode 1
Dara Bromm Genesi	Stay-at-Home Mom	New York City	54	**Ice Cream Flavors**; Airport codes	11	8. Ice Cream Flavors – Dara defeats Haji (Ep. 1); 9. Antiques – Laura defeats Dara (Ep. 2)	2	N/A	Episode 2
Carolyne Harris	College Student	Atlanta, Georgia	21	**Female Country Stars**	53	10. Female Country Stars – Cody defeats Carolyne (Ep. 2)	1	N/A	Episode 2
Cody Tebo	Electrician	Williston, North Dakota	37	**Sandwich Ingredients**	52	10. Female Country Stars – Cody defeats Carolyne (Ep. 2); 11. SNL Alumni – Michael defeats Cody (Ep. 2)	2	N/A	Episode 2
Darlene Slaton	Dance Teacher	Charleston, South Carolina	64	**Sushi**	29	12. Sushi – Alex defeats Darlene (Ep. 2)	1	N/A	Episode 2
LaShonda Manns	Finance Manager	Little Elm, Texas	50	**20th Century Inventions**	49	13. Convenience Store Items – Brian defeats LaShonda (Ep. 2)	1	N/A	Episode 2
Madeline Crispell	Curator	Evanston, Illinois	30	**Landmark Architecture**	68	2. Pets – Madeline defeats Dayna (Ep. 1); 3. Ancient History – Madeline defeats Carli (Ep. 1); 14. Landmark Architecture – Brian defeats Madeline (Ep. 2)	3	N/A	Episode 2
Logan Guerrero	HR Director	Charlotte, North Carolina	35	**Home Decor**; Classic Films	99	5. Home Decor – Logan defeats Jordan (Ep. 1); 6. Gardening – Logan defeats Nikki (Ep. 1); 7. Children's Literature – Logan defeats Noell (Ep. 1); 15. Classic Films – Brian defeats Logan (Ep. 2)	4	Episode 1; 4 spaces ($20,000)	Episode 2
Jahmani Swanson	Professional Athlete	New York City	38	**College Basketball**	25	16. Breakfast – Brianna defeats Jahmani (Ep. 2)	1	N/A	Episode 2
Brianna Salerno	Beauty Influencer	El Dorado Hills, California	29	**Breakfast**; College Basketball	15	16. Breakfast – Brianna defeats Jahmani (Ep. 2); 17. Black & White – Nick defeats Brianna (Ep. 3)	2	N/A	Episode 3
Garrett Murphy	Software Engineer	Phoenix, Arizona	52	**Hunting & Camping**	91	18. Islands – Mike defeats Garrett (Ep. 3)	1	N/A	Episode 3
Magic Demirel	High School Teacher	Seattle, Washington	37	**Doomsday Prep**	72	19. Summer Olympic Events – Kent defeats Magic (Ep. 3)	1	N/A	Episode 3
Kent Ferguson	Director of Talent Acquisition	Cedar Rapids, Iowa	61	**Summer Olympic Events**; Doomsday Prep	73	19. Summer Olympic Events – Kent defeats Magic (Ep. 3); 20. Doomsday Prep – Marc defeats Kent (Ep. 3)	2	N/A	Episode 3
Marc Wade	Digital Executive Producer	Los Angeles County, California	67	**Star Trek**	82	20. Doomsday Prep – Marc defeats Kent (Ep. 3); 21. Sandwich Ingredients – Michael defeats Marc (Ep. 3)	2	N/A	Episode 3
Laura DuBard Wren	Artist	Cecil, Georgia	69	**Antiques**; Airport Codes	1	9. Antiques – Laura defeats Dara (Ep. 2); 22. Airport codes – Steven defeats Laura (Ep. 3)	2	N/A	Episode 3
Brian Hunter	Retired FBI	Toms River, New Jersey	58	**Electronics**	61	23. Electronics – Mark defeats Brian (Ep. 3)	1	N/A	Episode 3
Kenny Brasch	Talent Buyer	Chicago, Illinois	43	**Travel Accessories**	41	24. Rappers – Eric defeats Kenny (Ep. 3)	1	N/A	Episode 3
Seth Graham	Athlete Mentor	Chandler, Arizona	49	**Sports MVPs**	66	25. Sports MVPs – Terry defeats Seth (Ep. 3)	1	N/A	Episode 3
Matthew Palmer	Event Promoter	Arlington, Texas	38	**Classic Cars**	60	26. Sports Films – Clint defeats Matthew (Ep. 4)	1	N/A	Episode 4
Jeremy Decker	Store Supervisor	Omaha, Nebraska	46	**TV Moms**	6	27. College Basketball – Nick defeats Jeremy (Ep. 4)	1	N/A	Episode 4
Benedetta Toni Salerno	Small Business Owner	Moscow, Idaho	51	**Directors**	76	28. Yoga – Alex defeats Benedetta (Ep. 4)	1	N/A	Episode 4
Alex Levy	Yoga Teacher	Sacramento, California	30	**Yoga**; Directors	77	28. Yoga – Alex defeats Benedetta (Ep. 4); 29. 20th Century Inventions – Brian defeats Alex (Ep. 4)	1	N/A	Episode 4
Michael Sable	Communications Manager	Washington, D.C.	31	**SNL Alumni**; Sandwich Ingredients; Star Trek	63	11. SNL Alumni – Michael defeats Cody (Ep. 2); 21. Sandwich Ingredients – Michael defeats Marc (Ep. 3); 30. Star Trek – Sifat defeats Michael (Ep. 4)	3	N/A	Episode 4
Liz Williams	Attorney	Avoyelles Parish, Louisiana	34	**Agriculture**	27	31. Agriculture – Shannon defeats Liz (Ep. 4)	1	N/A	Episode 4
Shannon Ransom	Lab Tech	Philadelphia, Pennsylvania	26	**Anatomy**	26	31. Agriculture – Shannon defeats Liz (Ep. 4); 32. Math – Toni defeats Shannon (Ep. 4)	2	N/A	Episode 4
Lillie Sorrell	Mental Health Professional	Detroit, Michigan	35	**Fantasy Films**	18	33. Fantasy Films – Toni defeats Lillie (Ep. 4)	1	N/A	Episode 4
Nick Vogel	Data Scientist	Bethalto, Illinois	29	**Black & White**; College Basketball; TV Moms	16	17. Black & White – Nick defeats Brianna (Ep. 3); 27. College Basketball – Nick defeats Jeremy (Ep. 4); 34. TV Moms – Toni defeats Nick (Ep. 5)	3	N/A	Episode 5
Damon Keith	Puppeteer	Orlando, Florida	45	**Puppets**	14	35. Mythical Creatures – Andrew defeats Damon (Ep. 5)	1	N/A	Episode 5
Hank Slaughter	Veteran	Grand Prairie, Texas	60	**Rock & Roll Hall of Fame**	9	36. Iconic Duos – Elena defeats Hank (Ep. 5)	1	N/A	Episode 5
Barbie Olivas	Surgery Coordinator	Tamarac, Florida	45	**Latin Musicians**	64	37. Met Gala – Sifat defeats Barbie (Ep. 5)	1	N/A	Episode 5
Zack Albrecht	Product Manager	Odessa, Florida	38	**Trees**	22	38. Derby – Magan defeats Zack (Ep. 5)	1	N/A	Episode 5
Steve Kaye	Sports Marketing Executive	Philadelphia, Pennsylvania	31	**Collectibles**	13	39. Collectibles – Magan defeats Steve (Ep. 5)	1	N/A	Episode 5
Julian Bond	Social Media Manager	Allen Park, Michigan	41	**Fictional Fathers**	3	40. Fictional Fathers – Magan defeats Julian (Ep. 5)	1	N/A	Episode 5
Wyatt Rogers	Professional Bull Rider	Hulbert, Oklahoma	27	**Rodeo**	78	41. Directors – Brian defeats Wyatt (Ep. 5)	1	N/A	Episode 5
Michele O'Neill	Stay-at-Home Mom	Newark, New Jersey	45	**Backyard Games**	95	42. Stars with Stars – Priscilla defeats Michele (Ep. 6)	1	N/A	Episode 6
Bradley Spears	Senior Account Manager	Biloxi, Mississippi	34	**Poetry**	20	43. Toiletries – Kimberley defeats Bradley (Ep. 6)	1	N/A	Episode 6
Kimberley Chavez	Recruiter	Albuquerque, New Mexico	48	**Toiletries**; Poetry	19	43. Toiletries – Kimberley defeats Bradley (Ep. 6); 44. Natural History – Alex defeats Kimberley (Ep. 6)	2	N/A	Episode 6
Jameela Jones	Stay-at-Home Fiancée	San Antonio, Texas	30	**Kitchen Appliances**	40	45. Kitchen Appliances – Alex defeats Jameela (Ep. 6)	1	N/A	Episode 6
Elena Ferranti	Lifeguard	Cherry Hill, New Jersey	33	**Iconic Duos**; Rock & Roll Hall of Fame	10	36. Iconic Duos – Elena defeats Hank (Ep. 5); 46. Rock & Roll Hall of Fame – Alex defeats Elena (Ep. 6)	2	N/A	Episode 6
Ira Madison III	Podcast Host	New York City	37	**Real Housewives**	39	47. Real Housewives – Alex defeats Ira (Ep. 6)	1	N/A	Episode 6
Cherif Chris Mazloum	Engineer	Jacksonville, Florida	41	**Space Travel**	34	48. Space Travel – Robin defeats Cherif (Ep. 6)	1	N/A	Episode 6
James Allen	Stores Operator	Charlotte, North Carolina	34	**Parades**	37	49. Oceanography – Shane defeats James (Ep. 6)	1	N/A	Episode 6
Clarione Gutierrez-Owens	Artist	Las Vegas, Nevada	42	**Boy Bands**	2	50. TV Chefs – Steven defeats Clarione (Ep. 6)	1	N/A	Episode 6
Priscilla Sidney	Executive Assistant	Farmington Hills, Michigan	28	**Stars With Stars – Hollywood Walk of Fame**; Backyard Games	85	42. Stars with Stars – Priscilla defeats Michele (Ep. 6); 51. Backyard Games – Baron defeats Priscilla (Ep. 7)	2	N/A	Episode 7
Cassie Alaniz	Flight Attendant	Anchorage, Alaska	33	**Aviation**	98	52. Congress – Jay defeats Cassie (Ep. 7)	1	N/A	Episode 7
Jay Winkler	Archivist	Ypsilanti, Michigan	33	**Congress**; Aviation	97	52. Congress – Jay defeats Cassie (Ep. 7); 53. Rodeo – Brian defeats Jay (Ep. 7)	2	N/A	Episode 7
Phil Brow (Note: Phil was originally an alternate, but the original contestant in this place had to leave after episode 5, and was replaced with Phil.)	Customer Support Specialist	Villa Park, Illinois	49	**Song of the Year**	65	54. Pasta – Amanda defeats Phil (Ep. 7)	1	N/A	Episode 7
Spark Tabor	Recruiter	Cincinnati, Ohio	36	**Rom-Coms**	54	55. Latin Musicians – Sifat defeats Spark (Ep. 7)	1	N/A	Episode 7
Sifat Jahan	Project Manager	Brooklyn, New York	34	**Met Gala**; Latin Musicians; Rom-Coms	74	30. Star Trek – Sifat defeats Michael (Ep. 4); 37. Met Gala – Sifat defeats Barbie (Ep. 5); 55. Latin Musicians – Sifat defeats Spark (Ep. 7); 56. Crayon Colors – Stephanie defeats Sifat (Ep. 7)	4	N/A	Episode 7
Jeorgi Smith	Substitute Teacher	Denville, New Jersey	29	**Tony Winners**	83	57. Tony Winners – Stephanie defeats Jeorgi (Ep. 7)	1	N/A	Episode 7
Stephanie Dyer	Healthcare Recruiter	Panama, Oklahoma	43	**Crayon Colors**; Rom-Coms	84	56. Crayon Colors – Stephanie defeats Sifat (Ep. 7); 57. Tony Winners – Stephanie defeats Jeorgi (Ep. 7); 58. Hunting & Camping – Mike defeats Stephanie (Ep. 7)	3	N/A	Episode 7
Anna Leigh Wilson	Travel Photographer	Royse City, Texas	29	**Competition Shows**	44	59. Competition Shows – Mike defeats Anna Leigh (Ep. 8)	1	N/A	Episode 8
Robin Merriman	Retired Elementary School Teacher	Sharpsburg, Georgia	74	**State Quarters**	35	48. Space Travel – Robin defeats Cherif (Ep. 6); 60. State Quarters – Mike defeats Robin (Ep. 8)	2	N/A	Episode 8
Katie Park	Market Researcher	New York City	29	**Water Brands**	17	61. The Amazon – Mariana defeats Katie (Ep. 8)	1	N/A	Episode 8
Mariana Sala	Auditor	Boca Raton, Florida	29	**The Amazon**; Water Brands	7	61. The Amazon – Mariana defeats Katie (Ep. 8); 62. Teen Dramas – Emily defeats Mariana (Ep. 8)	2	N/A	Episode 8
Katina White	STEM Educator	Little Rock, Arkansas	44	**Physics**	42	63. Rom-Coms – Mike defeats Katina (Ep. 8)	1	N/A	Episode 8
Ashley Tucker	Public Affairs Specialist	Alexandria, Virginia	32	**Beyoncé Songs**	38	64. Parades – Shane defeats Ashley (Ep. 8)	1	N/A	Episode 8
Mike Nay	Claw Machine Operator	Salt Lake City, Utah	32	**Mountains**; Islands (Association Duel); Hunting & Camping; Rom-Coms; Physics	92	4. Mountains – Mike defeats Hennessy (Ep. 1); 18. Islands – Mike defeats Garrett (Ep. 3); 58. Hunting & Camping – Mike defeats Stephanie (Ep. 7); 59. Competition Shows – Mike defeats Anna Leigh (Ep. 8); 60. State Quarters – Mike defeats Robin (Ep. 8); 63. Rom-Coms – Mike defeats Katina (Ep. 8); 65. Physics – Shane defeats Mike (Ep. 8)	7	Split Episode 7; 14 Spaces ($10,000)	Episode 8
Jake Seamark	Project Manager	Detroit, Michigan	35	**Nerdy Characters**	71	66. Beyoncé Songs – Shane defeats Jake (Ep. 8)	1	N/A	Episode 8
Shane Brown	Content Creator	Kaneohe, Hawaii	32	**Oceanography**; Parades; Beyoncé Songs; Nerdy Characters	36	49. Oceanography – Shane defeats James (Ep. 6); 64. Parades – Shane defeats Ashley (Ep. 8); 65. Physics – Shane defeats Mike (Ep. 8); 66. Beyoncé Songs – Shane defeats Jake (Ep. 8); 67. Road Trip – Devin defeats Shane (Ep. 9)	5	Episode 8; 22 Spaces ($20,000)	Episode 9
Devin Brown	Teacher	Mount Juliet, Tennessee	40	**Road Trip**; Nerdy Characters	46	67. Road Trip – Devin defeats Shane (Ep. 9); 68. Travel Accessories – Eric defeats Devin (Ep. 9)	2	N/A	Episode 9
Mary-Ellen Jones	Wine Salesperson	Bay Village, Ohio	44	**Changemakers**	51	69. Changemakers – Eric defeats Mary-Ellen (Ep. 9)	1	N/A	Episode 9
Zackary "Slim" Simonini (Note: Slim was originally an alternate, but the original contestant in this place had to leave halfway through episode 8 for personal reasons, and was replaced with Slim.)	Technical Director	Antioch, Illinois	34	**Medicine**	32	70. Medicine – Eric defeats Slim (Ep. 9)	1	N/A	Episode 9
Kevin	Shop Manager	San Diego, California	34	**Endangered Animals**	5	71. Puppets – Andrew defeats Kevin (Ep. 9)	1	N/A	Episode 9
Marcus Louscious	Software Developer	Memphis, Tennessee	34	**Critters**	47	72. Nerdy Characters – Eric defeats Marcus (Ep. 9)	1	N/A	Episode 9
Anthony Williams	Business Systems Analyst	Georgetown, Texas	56	**Haunted Locations**	58	73. Aviation – Brian defeats Anthony (Ep. 9)	1	N/A	Episode 9
Kaylie Gragnano	Entrepreneur	Phoenix, Arizona	30	**Billionaires**	45	74. Critters – Eric defeats Kaylie (Ep. 9)	1	N/A	Episode 9
Eric Washington	non-profit Analyst	Houston, Texas	30	**Rappers**; Travel Accessories; Nerdy Characters; Critters; Billionaires	31	24. Rappers – Eric defeats Kenny (Ep. 3); 68. Travel Accessories – Eric defeats Devin (Ep. 9); 69. Changemakers – Eric defeats Mary-Ellen (Ep. 9); 70. Medicine – Eric defeats Slim (Ep. 9); 72. Nerdy Characters – Eric defeats Marcus (Ep. 9); 74. Critters – Eric defeats Kaylie (Ep. 9); 75. Billionaires – Kathy defeats Eric (Ep. 9)	7	N/A	Episode 9
Sharon Pfeiffer	Personal Assistant	Boca Raton, Florida	60	**Construction**	70	76. Baby Products – Makenna defeats Sharon (Ep. 10)	1	N/A	Episode 10
Makenna Jensen	Office Coordinator	Lehi, Utah	32	**Baby Products**; Construction	80	76. Baby Products – Makenna defeats Sharon (Ep. 10); 77. Haunted Locations – Brian defeats Makenna (Ep. 10)	2	N/A	Episode 10
Mariela "Mari" Pepin	Social Media Manager	Chicago, Illinois	28	**Hotels & Motels**	33	78. Punctuation and Symbols – Ted defeats Mari (Ep. 10)	1	N/A	Episode 10
Laura Eletel	Debate Teacher	Agoura Hills, California	31	**Languages** (Audio Duel)	55	79. Song of the Year – Amanda defeats Laura (Ep. 10)	1	N/A	Episode 10
Alex Zhou	Software Engineer	Seattle, Washington	28	**Cosplay**	24	80. Anatomy – Toni defeats Alex (Ep. 10)	1	N/A	Episode 10
Emily Rose Auth	Real Estate Agent	New York City	27	**Teen Dramas**; Water Brands	8	62. Teen Dramas – Emily defeats Mariana (Ep. 8); 81. Water Brands – Toni defeats Emily (Ep. 10)	2	N/A	Episode 10
Tyler	Event Specialist	West Hollywood, California	34	**Fairy Tales & Fables**	100	82. Construction – Brian defeats Tyler (Ep. 10)	1	N/A	Episode 10
Ashlee Branyan	Professional Hype Woman	Los Angeles, California	26	**Authors**	94	83. Murder Mysteries – Kathy defeats Ashlee (Ep. 10)	1	N/A	Episode 10
Brian O'Halloran	Actor	Lords Valley, Pennsylvania	54	**Convenience Store Items**; 20th Century Inventions; Directors; Rodeo; Aviation; Haunted Locations; Construction; Fairy Tales & Fables	59	13. Convenience Store Items – Brian defeats LaShonda (Ep. 2); 14. Landmark Architecture – Brian defeats Madeline (Ep. 2); 15. Classic Films – Brian defeats Logan (Ep. 2); 29. 20th Century Inventions – Brian defeats Alex (Ep. 4); 41. Directors – Brian defeats Wyatt (Ep. 5); 53. Rodeo – Brian defeats Jay (Ep. 7); 73. Aviation – Brian defeats Anthony (Ep. 9); 77. Haunted Locations – Brian defeats Makenna (Ep. 10); 82. Construction – Brian defeats Tyler (Ep. 10); 84. Fairy Tales & Fables – Zaph defeats Brian (Ep. 11)	10	Episode 2 Episode 3; 9 Spaces; Episode 4; 11 Spaces; Episode 5 Episode 6; 12 Spaces; Split Episode 7; 14 Spaces ($110,000)	Episode 11
Amanda Taejon	IT Specialist	Springfield, Missouri	31	**Pasta**; Song of the Year; Languages (Audio Duel)	75	54. Pasta – Amanda defeats Phil (Ep. 7); 79. Song of the Year – Amanda defeats Laura (Ep. 10); 85. Languages – Zaph defeats Amanda (Ep. 11)	3	N/A	Episode 11
Zaph Hutson	English Language Teacher	Olathe, Kansas	28	**Eras** (Association Duel)	86	84. Fairy Tales and Fables – Zaph defeats Brian (Ep. 11); 85. Languages – Zaph defeats Amanda (Ep. 11); 86. Marvel – Baron defeats Zaph (Ep. 11)	3	N/A	Episode 11
Baron Nguyen	Operations	Los Angeles, California	28	**Marvel**; Eras (Association Duel)	96	51. Backyard Games – Baron defeats Priscilla (Ep. 7); 86. Marvel – Baron defeats Zaph (Ep. 11); 87. Classic Cars – Clint defeats Baron (Ep. 11)	3	N/A	Episode 11
Clint Hudson	Singer-Songwriter	Austin, Texas	40	**Sports Films**; Classic Cars; Eras (Association Duel)	50	26. Sports Films – Clint defeats Matthew (Ep. 4); 87. Classic Cars – Clint defeats Baron (Ep. 11); 88. Eras – David defeats Clint (Ep. 11)	3	N/A	Episode 11
Kathy Zimmer	Fitness Instructor	Denver, Colorado	50	**Murder Mysteries**; Authors	81	75. Billionaires – Kathy defeats Eric (Ep. 9); 83. Murder Mysteries – Kathy defeats Ashlee (Ep. 10); 89. Authors – Laurel defeats Kathy (Ep. 11)	3	Episode 9; 30 Spaces; Episode 10; 31 Spaces ($40,000)	Episode 11
Lisa Boares	Wedding Chapel Owner	Las Vegas, Nevada	60	**Weddings**	67	1. Pantry Items – Lisa defeats Jamella (Ep. 1); 90. European Geography – David defeats Lisa (Ep. 11)	2	N/A	Episode 11
"Scary" Terry Tansel	Assistant Principal	Perrysburg, Ohio	47	**Bodies of Water**	56	25. Sports MVPs – Terry defeats Seth (Ep. 3); 91. Bodies of Water – David defeats Terry (Ep. 11)	2	N/A	Episode 11
Laurel O' Connor	Communications Director	Austin, Texas	38	**The Crown**	48	89. Authors – Laurel defeats Kathy (Ep. 11); 92. Hotels & Motels – Ted defeats Laurel (Ep. 12)	2	Split Episode 11; 32 Spaces ($10,000)	Episode 12
Magan Wiles	Tango Studio Owner	Inglewood, California	41	**Derby**; Trees	23	38. Derby – Magan defeats Zack (Ep. 5); 39. Collectibles – Magan defeats Steve (Ep. 5); 40. Fictional Fathers – Magan defeats Julian (Ep. 5); 93. Trees – Ted defeats Magan (Ep. 12)	4	N/A	Episode 12
Mark T. Talukdar	Sales Coach	Austin, Texas	37	**Fortune 500**	62	23. Electronics – Mark defeats Brian (Ep. 3); 94. Fortune 500 – Ted defeats Mark (Ep. 12)	2	N/A	Episode 12
Ted Steinberg	Law Clerk	Boston, Massachusetts	30	**Punctuation & Symbols**; Hotels & Motels; The Crown	43	78. Punctuation and Symbols – Ted defeats Mari (Ep. 10); 92. Hotels & Motels – Ted defeats Laurel (Ep. 12); 93. Trees – Ted defeats Magan (Ep. 12); 94. Fortune 500 – Ted defeats Mark (Ep. 12); 95. The Crown – Toni defeats Ted (Ep. 12)	5	N/A	Episode 12
Toni Akande	Medical Scribe	Brentwood, Tennessee	23	**Math –** Multiplication; Anatomy; Cosplay	28	32. Math – Toni defeats Shannon (Ep. 4); 33. Fantasy Films – Toni defeats Lillie (Ep. 4); 34. TV Moms – Toni defeats Nick (Ep. 5); 80. Anatomy – Toni defeats Alex (Ep. 10); 81. Water Brands – Toni defeats Emily (Ep. 10); 95. The Crown – Toni defeats Ted (Ep. 12); 96. Weddings – David defeats Toni (Ep. 12)	7	N/A	Episode 12
Alex Navissi	Technology Consultant	Austin, Texas	39	**Natural History**; Poetry	30	12. Sushi – Alex defeats Darlene (Ep. 2); 44. Natural History – Alex defeats Kimberley (Ep. 6); 45. Kitchen Appliances – Alex defeats Jameela (Ep. 6); 46. Rock & Roll Hall of Fame – Alex defeats Elena (Ep. 6); 47. Real Housewives – Alex defeats Ira (Ep. 6); 97. Poetry – David defeats Alex (Ep. 12)	6	N/A	Episode 12
David Madden	Academic Competition Director	Ridgewood, New Jersey	43	**European Geography**; Weddings; Cosplay	90	88. Eras – David defeats Clint (Ep. 11); 90. European Geography – David defeats Lisa (Ep. 11); 91. Bodies of Water – David defeats Terry (Ep. 11); 96. Weddings – David defeats Toni (Ep. 12); 97. Poetry – David defeats Alex (Ep. 12); 98. Endangered Animals – Andrew defeats David (Ep. 12)	6	Split Episode 11; 32 Spaces ($10,000)	Episode 12
Andrew Edwards	Animator	Alhambra, California	28	**Mythical Creatures**; Puppets; Endangered Animals; Cosplay	4	35. Mythical Creatures – Andrew defeats Damon (Ep. 5); 71. Puppets – Andrew defeats Kevin (Ep. 9); 98. Endangered Animals – Andrew defeats David (Ep. 12); 99. Boy Bands – Steven defeats Andrew (0–1) (Ep. 12); 100. Cosplay – Andrew defeats Steven (1–1) (Ep. 12); 101. International Foods – Steven defeats Andrew (1–2) (Ep. 12)	6	N/A	Episode 12
Steven Havens	Chef	Portland, Oregon	47	**TV Chefs**; Boy Bands	12	22. Airport codes – Steven defeats Laura (Ep. 3); 50. TV Chefs – Steven defeats Clarione (Ep. 6); 99. Boy Bands – Steven defeats Andrew (1–0) (Ep. 12); 100. Cosplay – Andrew defeats Steven (1–1) (Ep. 12); 101. International Foods – Steven defeats Andrew (2–1) (Ep. 12)	5	**Season Winner** **($250,000)**	

Color key:

This person was the winner
This person was the runner-up
This person won the duel
This person won the duel and the Time Boost
This person, who used the Time Boost, won the duel
This person lost the duel
This person, who used the Time Boost, lost the duel
This person did not duel

Standings (Season 3)
Contestant	Game																																																																																																				
Contestant	Episode 1								Episode 2								Episode 3									Episode 4								Episode 5								Episode 6									Episode 7								Episode 8								Episode 9									Episode 10								Episode 11								Episode 12									
Contestant	1	2	3	4	5	6	7	8	9	10	11	12	13	14	15	16	17	18	19	20	21	22	23	24	25	26	27	28	29	30	31	32	33	34	35	36	37	38	39	40	41	42	43	44	45	46	47	48	49	50	51	52	53	54	55	56	57	58	59	60	61	62	63	64	65	66	67	68	69	70	71	72	73	74	75	76	77	78	79	80	81	82	83	84	85	86	87	88	89	90	91	92	93	94	95	96	97	98	99	100	101
Steven Havens																						WIN																												WIN																																																	WIN	LOSE	**WINNER**
Andrew Edwards																																			WIN																																				WIN																											WIN	LOSE	WIN	RUNNER-UP
David Madden																																																																	WIN		WIN	WIN					WIN	WIN	OUT																										
Alex Navissi												WIN																																WIN	WIN	WIN	WIN																																																		OUT				
Toni Akande																																WIN	WIN	WIN																																														WIN	WIN														WIN	OUT					
Ted Steinberg																																																																	WIN														WIN	WIN	WIN	OUT																			
Mark T. Talukdar																							WIN																																																																	OUT													
Magan Wiles																																						WIN	WIN	WIN																																																					OUT								
Laurel O' Connor																																																																	WIN			OUT																																	
"Scary" Terry Tansel																									WIN																																																																	OUT											
Lisa Boares	WIN																																																																	OUT																																			
Kathy Zimmer																																																																	WIN								WIN						OUT																						
Clint Hudson																										WIN																																																													WIN	OUT													
Baron Nguyen																																																			WIN																																			WIN	OUT														
Zaph Hutson																																																																	WIN	WIN	OUT																																		
Amanda Taejon																																																						WIN																									WIN						OUT																
Brian O'Halloran													WIN	WIN	WIN														WIN												WIN												WIN																				WIN				WIN					WIN		OUT																	
Ashlee Branyan																																																																	OUT																																				
Tyler																																																																	OUT																																				
Emily Rose Auth																																																														WIN																			OUT																				
Alex Zhou																																																																	OUT																																				
Laura Eletel																																																																	OUT																																				
Mariela "Mari" Pepin																																																																	OUT																																				
Makenna Jensen																																																																	WIN	OUT																																			
Sharon Pfeiffer																																																																	OUT																																				
Eric Washington																								WIN																																												WIN	WIN	WIN		WIN		WIN	OUT																										
Kaylie Gragnano																																																																	OUT																																				
Anthony Williams																																																																	OUT																																				
Marcus Louscious																																																																	OUT																																				
Kevin																																																																	OUT																																				
Zackary "Slim" Simonini																																																																	OUT																																				
Mary-Ellen Jones																																																																	OUT																																				
Devin Brown																																																																	WIN	OUT																																			
Shane Brown																																																	WIN															WIN	WIN	WIN	OUT																																		
Jake Seamark																																																																	OUT																																				
Mike Nay				WIN														WIN																																								WIN	WIN	WIN			WIN		OUT																																				
Ashley Tucker																																																																OUT																																					
Katina White																																																															OUT																																						
Mariana Sala																																																													WIN	OUT																																							
Katie Park																																																													OUT																																								
Robin Merriman																																																WIN												OUT																																									
Anna Leigh Wilson																																																											OUT																																										
Stephanie Dyer																																																								WIN	WIN	OUT																																											
Jeorgi Smith																																																									OUT																																												
Sifat Jahan																														WIN							WIN																		WIN	OUT																																													
Spark Tabor																																																							OUT																																														
Phil Brow																																																						OUT																																															
Jay Winkler																																																				WIN	OUT																																																
Cassie Alaniz																																																				OUT																																																	
Priscilla Sidney																																										WIN									OUT																																																		
Clarione Gutierrez-Owens																																																		OUT																																																			
James Allen																																																	OUT																																																				
Cherif Chris Mazloum																																																OUT																																																					
Ira Madison III																																															OUT																																																						
Elena Ferranti																																				WIN										OUT																																																							
Jameela Jones																																													OUT																																																								
Kimberley Chavez																																											WIN	OUT																																																									
Bradley Spears																																											OUT																																																										
Michele O'Neill																																										OUT																																																											
Wyatt Rogers																																									OUT																																																												
Julian Bond																																								OUT																																																													
Steve Kaye																																							OUT																																																														
Zack Albrecht																																						OUT																																																															
Barbie Olivas																																					OUT																																																																
Hank Slaughter																																				OUT																																																																	
Damon Keith																																			OUT																																																																		
Nick Vogel																	WIN										WIN							OUT																																																																			
Lillie Sorrell																																	OUT																																																																				
Shannon Ransom																															WIN	OUT																																																																					
Liz Williams																															OUT																																																																						
Michael Sable											WIN										WIN									OUT																																																																							
Alex Levy																												WIN	OUT																																																																								
Benedetta Toni Salerno																												OUT																																																																									
Jeremy Decker																											OUT																																																																										
Matthew Palmer																										OUT																																																																											
Seth Graham																									OUT																																																																												
Kenny Brasch																								OUT																																																																													
Brian Hunter																							OUT																																																																														
Laura DuBard Wren									WIN													OUT																																																																															
Marc Wade																				WIN	OUT																																																																																
Kent Ferguson																			WIN	OUT																																																																																	
Magic Demirel																			OUT																																																																																		
Garrett Murphy																		OUT																																																																																			
Brianna Salerno																WIN	OUT																																																																																				
Jahmani Swanson																OUT																																																																																					
Logan Guerrero					WIN	WIN	WIN								OUT																																																																																						
Madeline Crispell		WIN	WIN											OUT																																																																																							
LaShonda Manns													OUT																																																																																								
Darlene Slaton												OUT																																																																																									
Cody Tebo										WIN	OUT																																																																																										
Carolyne Harris										OUT																																																																																											
Dara Bromm Genesi								WIN	OUT																																																																																												
Hajira Sultana								OUT																																																																																													
Noell Allen							OUT																																																																																														
Nikki Santos						OUT																																																																																															
Jordan Sweet					OUT																																																																																																
Hennessy Williams III				OUT																																																																																																	
Carli Michelle			OUT																																																																																																		
Dayna Marie		OUT																																																																																																			
Jamella Usman	OUT																																																																																																				

=== Season 4 ===
In September 2025, Fox revealed that the season would have the theme "America Duels", in which the field will feature two representatives from each U.S. state.

Results (Season 4)
Name	Job	City	Age	Category	Space Assignment	Duels	Duels Played	Episodes Won	Exited
Chuck "Charlie" Nasty	Drift Driving Instructor	San Antonio, Texas	25	**Wild West**	72	1. Fried Foods – Rick defeats Charlie (Ep. 1)	1	N/A	Episode 1
Elizabeth Grandchamp	Special Educator	Jericho, Vermont	36	**Sitcom Families**	76	2. Pet Supplies – Marcia defeats Elizabeth (Ep. 1)	1	N/A	Episode 1
Laura Fuller-Mills	Housewife	Woodbury, Minnesota	60	**Sandra Bullock Films**	65	3. Formal Wear – Frank defeats Laura (Ep. 1)	1	N/A	Episode 1
Frank Eddie	Retired Forklift Operator	Sandy, Utah	67	**Formal Wear**; Sandra Bullock Films	66	3. Formal Wear – Frank defeats Laura (Ep. 1); 4. Hall of Famers – Justin defeats Frank (Ep. 1)	2	N/A	Episode 1
Jackie TBD	Retired Clerk	Atlanta, Georgia	62	**Superfoods**	29	5. Villains – Demetrice defeats Jackie (Ep. 1)	1	N/A	Episode 1
Ricky Pugalee	Dentist	Fairbanks, Alaska	28	**The Great Outdoors**	79	6. Famous Couples – Cibelle defeats Ricky (Ep. 1)	1	N/A	Episode 1
Justin Call	Data Analyst	Provo, Utah	25	**Hall of Famers – Sports Hall of Fame**; Sandra Bullock Films	67	4. Hall of Famers – Justin defeats Frank (Ep. 1); 7. Sandra Bullock Films – Luke defeats Justin (Ep. 1)	2	N/A	Episode 1
Kwame Impraim	Judicial Assistant	Tucson, Arizona	38	**Stamps**	86	8. Stamps – Jonny defeats Kwame (Ep. 1)	1	N/A	Episode 1
Jonny Fairplay	Podcaster	Portland, Oregon	51	**Platinum Vinyl Albums**	96	8. Stamps – Jonny defeats Kwame (Ep. 1); 9. Sitcom Families – Marcia defeats Jonny (Ep. 2)	2	N/A	Episode 2
Evan D. Stein	Attorney	Omaha, Nebraska	35	**Food Holidays**	77	10. Food Holidays – Marcia defeats Evan (Ep. 2)	1	N/A	Episode 2
Marcia Pace	Flight Attendant	Atlanta, Georgia	35	**Pet Supplies**; Sitcom Families; Platinum Vinyl Albums	75	2. Pet Supplies – Marcia defeats Elizabeth (Ep. 1); 9. Sitcom Families – Marcia defeats Jonny (Ep. 2); 10. Food Holidays – Marcia defeats Evan (Ep. 2); 11. Platinum Vinyl Albums – Tim defeats Marcia (Ep. 2)	4	N/A	Episode 2
Brittany Richardson	Therapist	Hartford, Connecticut	36	**Dollar Store**	45	12. Dollar Store – David defeats Brittany (Ep. 2)	1	N/A	Episode 2
David Cowan	Events Coordinator	Boise, Idaho	35	**Fictional Creatures**	44	12. Dollar Store – David defeats Brittany (Ep. 2); 13. Theme Parties – Katelyn defeats David (Ep. 2)	2	N/A	Episode 2
Delante Murrell	Real Estate Agent	Waldorf, Maryland	37	**Real Estate**	97	14. Junkyard – Tim defeats Delante (Ep. 2)	1	N/A	Episode 2
Heather Felder	Stilt Walker	St. Louis, Missouri	39	**Variety Acts**	10	15. Variety Acts – Molly defeats Heather (Ep. 2)	1	N/A	Episode 2
Tim Mooney	Junkyard Owner	East Meadow, New York	54	**Junkyard**; Real Estate	85	11. Platinum Vinyl Albums – Tim defeats Marcia (Ep. 2); 14. Junkyard – Tim defeats Delante (Ep. 2); 16. Real Estate – Ty defeats Tim (Ep. 2)	3	N/A	Episode 2
Domenic Murgo	Compensation Negotiator	Warwick, Rhode Island	44	**Monopoly**	51	17. Chip Brands – Christina defeats Dom (Ep. 3)	1	N/A	Episode 3
Dash Anderson	Elementary School Teacher	West Hartford, Connecticut	40	**Hip-Hop Stars**	2	18. Commodites – Brad defeats Dash (Ep. 3)	1	N/A	Episode 3
Bo Bice	Musician	Nashville, Tennessee	49	**Car Racing**	63	19. Mammals – Kiera defeats Bo (Ep. 3)	1	N/A	Episode 3
Kiera Cheyenne	Influencer	Wisconsin Dells, Wisconsin	26	**Mammals**; Car Racing	62	19. Mammals – Kiera defeats Bo (Ep. 3); 20. Viral Moments – Sam defeats Kiera (Ep. 3)	2	N/A	Episode 3
Sam Kubernick	Attorney	Portland, Oregon	51	**Viral Moments**; Car Racing	53	20. Viral Moments – Sam defeats Kiera (Ep. 3); 21. Simpsons Characters – Erin defeats Sam (Ep. 3)	2	N/A	Episode 3
Kristy Joy Browning	Librarian	Huntington, West Virginia	47	**Banned Books**	74	22. Banned Books – Erin defeats Kristy (Ep. 3)	1	N/A	Episode 3
Erin Walker	Data Engineer	Olive, Iowa	35	**Simpsons Characters**; Car Racing	73	21. Simpsons Characters – Erin defeats Sam (Ep. 3); 22. Banned Books – Erin defeats Kristy (Ep. 3); 23. Theme Parks – Ashley defeats Erin (Ep. 3)	3	N/A	Episode 3
Ty Gabby	Account Manager	Meridian, Idaho	56	**Brat Pack**	87	16. Real Estate – Ty defeats Tim (Ep. 2); 24. Brat Pack – Ashley defeats Ty (Ep. 3)	2	Episode 2; 8 spaces ($20,000)	Episode 3
Kyle Remillard	Sports Trader	Providence, Rhode Island	32	**Emmy-Winning TV Shows**	93	25. Emmy-Winning TV Shows – Ashley defeats Kyle (Ep. 3)	1	N/A	Episode 3
Tom Roels	Retired Farmer	Caledonia, Michigan	71	**Impressions** (Audio Duel)	19	26. Impressions – Jason defeats Tom (Ep. 4)	1	N/A	Episode 4
Carlheb Cemesca	Artist	Boston, Massachusetts	29	**Telling Time**	13	27. Telling Time – Megan defeats Carlheb (Ep. 4)	1	N/A	Episode 4
Megan Graves	Opera Singer	Cincinnati, Ohio	27	**Coffee**	3	27. Telling Time – Megan defeats Carlheb (Ep. 4); 28. Public Transit – Aaron defeats Megan (Ep. 4)	2	N/A	Episode 4
King Bo	Influencer	Oklahoma City, Oklahoma	25	**Red Carpet** (Video Duel)	4	29. Red Carpet – Aaron defeats Bo (Ep. 4)	1	N/A	Episode 4
Kristi Raab	Teacher	Brookings, South Dakota	44	**Buffet**	24	30. Buffet – Aaron defeats Kristi (Ep. 4)	1	N/A	Episode 4
Victoria TBD	Student	Tampa, Florida	18	**TED Talk**	34	31. TED Talk – Aaron defeats Victoria (Ep. 4)	1	N/A	Episode 4
Harley Banker	Student	Watchung, New Jersey	18	**High School**	5	32. High School – Aaron defeats Harley (Ep. 4)	1	N/A	Episode 4
Katelyn Perkins Lott	Travel Agent	Tuscaloosa, Alabama	37	**Theme Parties**; Fictional Creatures	54	13. Theme Parties – Katelyn defeats David (Ep. 2); 33. Fictional Creatures – Aaron defeats Katelyn (Ep. 4)	2	N/A	Episode 4
Ashley Rivera	Orthodontic Receptionist	Hesperia, California	30	**Theme Parks**; Car Racing; ~~Harry Potter~~ (Stole from Courtney, Stolen by Aaron); Coffee	83	23. Theme Parks – Ashley defeats Erin (Ep. 3); 24. Brat Pack – Ashley defeats Ty (Ep. 3); 25. Emmy-Winning TV Shows – Ashley defeats Kyle (Ep. 3); 34. Coffee – Aaron defeats Ashley (Ep. 4)	4	Episode 3; 15 spaces ($20,000)	Episode 4
Idecia Chapman	Customer Service Manager	Hattiesburg, Mississippi	28	**Food Pairings**	60	35. Food Pairings – Arlene defeats Idecia (Ep. 5)	1	N/A	Episode 5
Dorian Hunter	Chef	Phoenix, Arizona	51	**Lisa Frank**	95	36. Lisa Frank – Ashton defeats Dorian (Ep. 5)	1	N/A	Episode 5
Shelby Black	HR Manager & Compliance	Manassas, Virginia	41	**Movie Musicals**	91	37. Movie Musicals – Matt defeats Shelby (Ep. 5)	1	N/A	Episode 5
Tania Pritz	Chiropractor	Rehoboth, Delaware	58	**Bones**	98	38. Playing Cards – Josh defeats Tania (Ep. 5)	1	N/A	Episode 5
Arlene Santiago	Chemist	Minneapolis, Minnesota	34	**Houseplants**	59	35. Food Pairings – Arlene defeats Idecia (Ep. 5); 39. Houseplants – Elizabeth defeats Arlene (Ep. 5)	2	N/A	Episode 5
Leigh Chesnut	Research Coordinator	Strafford, Vermont	69	**Famous Criminals**	69	40. Famous Criminals – Elizabeth defeats Leigh (Ep. 5)	1	N/A	Episode 5
Cibelle Burgos	Communications Specialist	Astoria, New York	29	**Famous Couples**; The Great Outdoors	78	6. Famous Couples – Cibelle defeats Ricky (Ep. 1); 41. Great Outdoors – Elizabeth defeats Cibelle (Ep. 5)	2	N/A	Episode 5
Aaron Dozzi	Bartender	Charlotte, North Carolina	28	**Public Transit**; Coffee; ~~Harry Potter~~ (Stole from Ashley, Stolen by Elizabeth); Regency Era	14	28. Public Transit – Aaron defeats Megan (Ep. 4); 29. Red Carpet – Aaron defeats Bo (Ep. 4); 30. Buffet – Aaron defeats Kristi (Ep. 4); 31. TED Talk – Aaron defeats Victoria (Ep. 4); 32. High School – Aaron defeats Harley (Ep. 4); 33. Fictional Creatures – Aaron defeats Katelyn (Ep. 4); 34. Coffee – Aaron defeats Ashley (Ep. 4); 42. Regency Era – Elizabeth defeats Aaron (Ep. 5)	8	Episode 4; 25 spaces ($20,000)	Episode 5
Liliana Cervantes	Stand-Up Comedian	Las Vegas, Nevada	47	**Tablescapes**	23	43. Tablescapes – Mark defeats Liliana (Ep. 6)	1	N/A	Episode 6
Mark Borison	Producer & Commercial Actor	Florence, Kentucky	41	**Junk Food**	22	43. Tablescapes – Mark defeats Liliana (Ep. 6); 44. Harry Potter – Elizabeth defeats Mark (Ep. 6)	2	N/A	Episode 6
Elizabeth Benefield	Corporate Attorney	Wilmington, Delaware	51	**Regency Era**; Harry Potter (Stole from Aaron); Junk Food	50	39. Houseplants – Elizabeth defeats Arlene (Ep. 5); 40. Famous Criminals – Elizabeth defeats Leigh (Ep. 5); 41. Great Outdoors – Elizabeth defeats Cibelle (Ep. 5); 42. Regency Era – Elizabeth defeats Aaron (Ep. 5); 44. Harry Potter – Elizabeth defeats Mark (Ep. 6); 45. Holiday Foods – Kelsey defeats Elizabeth (Ep. 6)	6	Episode 5; 31 spaces ($20,000)	Episode 6
Christina Hazen	Opera Singer	Loveland, Colorado	30	**Chip Brands**; Monopoly	61	17. Chip Brands – Christina defeats Dom (Ep. 3); 46. Monopoly – Kelsey defeats Christina (Ep. 6)	2	N/A	Episode 6
Kelsey Buchholz	High School Teacher	Garretson, South Dakota	39	**Holiday Foods**; Junk Food	55	45. Holiday Foods – Kelsey defeats Elizabeth (Ep. 6); 46. Monopoly – Kelsey defeats Christina (Ep. 6); 47. On-Screen Judges – Luke defeats Kelsey (Ep. 6)	3	N/A	Episode 6
Luke Jobe	Public Defender	Albuquerque, New Mexico	28	**On-Screen Judges**; Junk Food	57	7. Sandra Bullock Films – Luke defeats Justin (Ep. 1); 47. On-Screen Judges – Luke defeats Kelsey (Ep. 6); 48. Scents – Charlie defeats Luke (Ep. 6)	3	Episode 1; 4 spaces ($40,000)	Episode 6
Charlie DeLuca	Scientist	Detroit, Michigan	25	**Scents**; Junk Food	47	48. Scents – Charlie defeats Luke (Ep. 6); 49. Junk Food – Jonathan defeats Charlie (Ep. 6)	2	N/A	Episode 6
Bob Deschenes	Software Consultant	Manchester, New Hampshire	66	**Combat Films**	41	50. Combat Films – Jonathan defeats Bob (Ep. 6)	1	N/A	Episode 6
Ashton Hamby	Helicopter Flight Nurse	West Monroe, Louisiana	30	**Ghost Stories**	94	36. Lisa Frank – Ashton defeats Dorian (Ep. 5); 51. Ghost Stories – Jonathan defeats Ashton (Ep. 7)	2	N/A	Episode 7
Andre Bland	Cartoonist	Williamsburg, Virginia	37	**State Nicknames**	38	52. Box Office Flops – Eric defeats Andre (Ep. 7)	1	N/A	Episode 7
Jeff Mladic	Grocery Store Manager	Chicago, Illinois	56	**U.S. Stadiums**	39	53. U.S. Stadiums – Eric defeats Jeff (Ep. 7)	1	N/A	Episode 7
Eric Walukonis	Transportation Coordinator	Crofton, Maryland	39	**Box Office Flops**; State Nicknames	28	52. Box Office Flops – Eric defeats Andre (Ep. 7); 53. U.S. Stadiums – Eric defeats Jeff (Ep. 7); 54. Fruit Trees – Rebecca defeats Eric (Ep. 7)	3	N/A	Episode 7
Demetrice Jones	Nurse	Mobile, Alabama	29	**Villains**; Superfoods	30	5. Villains – Demetrice defeats Jackie (Ep. 1); 55. Superfoods – Rebecca defeats Demetrice (Ep. 7)	2	N/A	Episode 7
Rebecca Flicher	Industrial Engineer	Omaha, Nebraska	30	**Fruit Trees**; State Nicknames	40	54. Fruit Trees – Rebecca defeats Eric (Ep. 7); 55. Superfoods – Rebecca defeats Demetrice (Ep. 7); 56. Summer Camp – Jason defeats Rebecca (Ep. 7)	3	N/A	Episode 7
Aaron Hernandez	Student	Fishers, Indiana	22	**Ancient Greece**	70	57. Deli – Debbie defeats Aaron (Ep. 7)	1	N/A	Episode 7
Debbie Lou Lmt	Massage Therapist	West Virginia	54	**Deli**; Ancient Greece	80	57. Deli – Debbie defeats Aaron (Ep. 7); 58. Marching Band – Josh defeats Debbie (Ep. 7)	2	N/A	Episode 7
Josh Rogers	HR Coordinator	Greenville, South Carolina	28	**Marching Band**; Ancient Greece	90	58. Marching Band – Josh defeats Debbie (Ep. 7); 59. Witchcraft – Ashley defeats Josh (Ep. 7)	2	N/A	Episode 7
Mark Hudson	Operations Manager	Avant, Oklahoma	55	**Country Music Awards**	99	60. Country Music Awards – Ashley defeats Mark (Ep. 8)	1	N/A	Episode 8
Sadia Khan	Labor and Delivery Nurse	Irvine, California	33	**Canadian Icons**	100	61. Canadian Icons – Ashley defeats Sadia (Ep. 8)	1	N/A	Episode 8
Sergio Reid	Crypto Consultant	Highlands Ranch, Colorado	36	**Mattel Toys**	56	62. Podcasters – Jonathan defeats Sergio (Ep. 8)	1	N/A	Episode 8
LaTasha Cooper	Midwife	Kingstree, South Carolina	39	**Phobias**	36	63. Phobias – Jonathan defeats LaTasha (Ep. 8)	1	N/A	Episode 8
Andrea Tuason	Student	Dubuque, Iowa	22	**Disney Animation**	26	64. Disney Animation – Jonathan defeats Andrea (Ep. 8)	1	N/A	Episode 8
Jonny Poswulski	Musician	Indianapolis, Indiana	40	**Famous Teachers**	21	65. Famous Teachers – Julie defeats Jonny (Ep. 8)	1	N/A	Episode 8
Emily Wingfield	Ticket Operations Manager	Charlotte, North Carolina	29	**Crime-Fighting Duos**	15	66. Energy Drinks – Jasmine defeats Emily (Ep. 8)	1	N/A	Episode 8
Jasmine Polintan	Buyer	Lynnwood, Washington	37	**Energy Drinks**; Crime-Fighting Duos	16	66. Energy Drinks – Jasmine defeats Emily (Ep. 8); 67. Terms of Endearment – Frank defeats Jasmine (Ep. 8)	2	N/A	Episode 8
Haley Ponthieux (Note: Haley was originally an alternate, but the original contestant in her place had to leave midway through episode 1 and was replaced with Haley.)	Photographer	New Orleans, Louisiana	26	**Fishing**	7	68. Junk in the Trunk – Ben defeats Haley (Ep. 8)	1	N/A	Episode 8
Frank Deryck-Linstruth	High School English Teacher	Lahaina, Hawaii	33	**Terms of Endearment**; Crime-Fighting Duos	17	67. Terms of Endearment – Frank defeats Jasmine (Ep. 8); 69. Crime-Fighting Duos – Ben defeats Frank (Ep. 9)	2	N/A	Episode 9
Ben Mason	Cancer Researcher	Annvile, Pennsylvania	29	**Junk in the Trunk**; Fishing	6	68. Junk in the Trunk – Ben defeats Haley (Ep. 8); 69. Crime-Fighting Duos – Ben defeats Frank (Ep. 9); 70. Gymnastics – Marques defeats Ben (Ep. 9)	3	N/A	Episode 9
Zach Dickey	Pastor	Auburn, Maine	36	**New England**	92	71. Book Adaptations – Jonathan defeats Zach (Ep. 9)	1	N/A	Episode 9
Jonathan Braylock	TV Writer	Rutherford, New Jersey	36	**Podcasters**; ~~Mattel Toys~~; Book Adaptations (Stolen from Armand); New England	46	49. Junk Food – Jonathan defeats Charlie (Ep. 6); 50. Combat Films – Jonathan defeats Bob (Ep. 6); 51. Ghost Stories – Jonathan defeats Ashton (Ep. 7); 62. Podcasters – Jonathan defeats Sergio (Ep. 8); 63. Phobias – Jonathan defeats LaTasha (Ep. 8); 64. Disney Animation – Jonathan defeats Andrea (Ep. 8); 71. Book Adaptations – Jonathan defeats Zach (Ep. 9); 72. Pez Dispensers – Lukas defeats Jonathan (Ep. 9)	8	Episode 6; 43 spaces Episode 7; 45 spaces Episode 8; 48 spaces ($60,000)	Episode 9
Anshpreet Kaur	ICU Nurse	Nashville, Tennessee	32	**Luxury Car Brands**	49	73. Presidents – Rick defeats Anshrpeet (Ep. 9)	1	N/A	Episode 9
Lukas Taylor	Data Entry	Las Vegas, Nevada	33	**Pez Dispensers**; New England	42	72. Pez Dispensers – Lukas defeats Jonathan (Ep. 9); 74. New England – Rick defeats Lukas (Ep. 9)	2	N/A	Episode 9
Rick Overdorff	Air Force Veteran	Fall River, Massachusetts	72	**Presidents** (Association Duel); Luxury Car Brands	48	73. Presidents – Rick defeats Anshrpeet (Ep. 9); 74. New England – Rick defeats Lukas (Ep. 9); 75. Fishing – Marques defeats Rick (Ep. 9)	3	N/A	Episode 9
Marques Bottorf	Digital Campaign Coordinator	Honolulu, Hawaii	28	**Gymnastics**; Fishing; Luxury Car Brands	27	70. Gymnastics – Marques defeats Ben (Ep. 9); 75. Fishing – Marques defeats Rick (Ep. 9); 76. Luxury Car Brands – Laz defeats Marques (Ep. 9)	3	N/A	Episode 9
Gary Waldron McGinnis	Professor	Seattle, Washington	63	**Leather**	12	77. Leather – Jacob defeats Gary (Ep. 10)	1	N/A	Episode 10
Laz Martino	Impressionist	Miami, Florida	50	**Arcade**	64	76. Luxury Car Brands – Laz defeats Marques (Ep. 9); 78. Arcade – Nicki defeats Laz (Ep. 10)	2	Episode 9; 59 spaces ($20,000)	Episode 10
Nicki Abare	Closet Designer	Bedford, New Hampshire	42	**Home Organization**	52	78. Arcade – Nicki defeats Laz (Ep. 10); 79. Christmas – Julie defeats Nicki (Ep. 10)	2	N/A	Episode 10
Jason Bige Burnett	Artist	Helena, Montana	40	**Summer Camp**; State Nicknames	20	26. Impressions – Jason defeats Tom (Ep. 4); 56. Summer Camp – Jason defeats Rebecca (Ep. 7); 80. State Nicknames – Julie defeats Jason (Ep. 10)	3	Episode 4 Golden Square ($10,000)	Episode 10
Julie Johnson	Kindergarten Teacher	Minot, North Dakota	32	**Christmas**; Home Organization	31	65. Famous Teachers – Julie defeats Jonny (Ep. 8); 79. Christmas – Julie defeats Nicki (Ep. 10); 80. State Nicknames – Julie defeats Jason (Ep. 10); 81. Mattel Toys – Armand defeats Julie (Ep. 10)	4	N/A	Episode 10
Bradley "Brad" Felty	Accountant	Taos Ski Valley, New Mexico	31	**Commodities**; Hip-Hop Stars	1	18. Commodites – Brad defeats Dash (Ep. 3); 82. Hip-Hop Stars – Armand defeats Brad (Ep. 10)	2	N/A	Episode 10
Armand Fruge	Analyst	Wichita, Kansas	36	**~~Book Adaptations~~ (Stolen by Jonathan)**; Mattel Toys; Home Organization	18	81. Mattel Toys – Armand defeats Julie (Ep. 10); 82. Hip-Hop Stars – Armand defeats Brad (Ep.10); 83. Exercise Moves – Matt defeats Armand (Ep. 10)	3	N/A	Episode 10
Matt Pappadia	Gym Owner	Austin, Texas	33	**Exercise Moves** (Video Duel); Home Organization	81	37. Movie Musicals – Matt defeats Shelby (Ep. 5); 83. Exercise Moves – Matt defeats Armand (Ep. 10); 84. Home Organization – Valerie defeats Matt (Ep. 10)	3	N/A	Episode 10
Bailey Sager	Dental Assistant	Thermopolis, Wyoming	36	**Dentist Office**	33	85. Dentist Office – Nicole defeats Bailey (Ep. 11)	1	N/A	Episode 11
Courtney Mckee	Bookkeeper	Hattiesburg, Mississippi	27	**~~Harry Potter~~ (Stolen by Ashley)**; Car Racing	58	86. State Flowers – Clara defeats Courtney (Ep. 11)	1	N/A	Episode 11
Jeremy Johnston	Middle School Teacher	Rugby, North Dakota	34	**Roman Numerals**	37	87. White House – Valerie defeats Jeremy (Ep. 11)	1	N/A	Episode 11
Valerie Ong	Former White House Staffer	Philadelphia, Pennsylvania	40	**White House**; Roman Numerals	8	84. Home Organization – Valerie defeats Matt (Ep. 10); 87. White House – Valerie defeats Jeremy (Ep. 11); 88. Swamplands – Jezrael defeats Valerie (Ep. 11)	3	Episode 10; 76 spaces ($20,000)	Episode 11
Clara Meinershagen	Baker	Noxon, Montana	36	**State Flowers**; Car Racing	68	86. State Flowers – Clara defeats Courtney (Ep. 11); 89. Car Racing – Jezrael defeats Clara (Ep. 11)	2	N/A	Episode 11
Jezrael Luckett	Tour Guide	Garden City, Kansas	42	**Swamplands**; Roman Numerals	32	88. Swamplands – Jezrael defeats Valerie (Ep. 11); 89. Car Racing – Jezrael defeats Clara (Ep. 11); 90. Wild West – Rick defeats Jezrael (Ep. 11)	3	N/A	Episode 11
Rick Kadile	Director of Marketing	Madison, Wisconsin	59	**Fried Foods**; Wild West; Roman Numerals	71	1. Fried Foods – Rick defeats Charlie (Ep. 1); 90. Wild West – Rick defeats Jezrael (Ep. 11); 91. Beatles Songs – Jacob defeats Rick (Ep. 11)	3	N/A	Episode 11
Kurt Libby	Software Developer	Bentonville, Arkansas	41	**Geometry**	82	92. Roman Numerals – Jacob defeats Kurt (Ep. 11)	1	N/A	Episode 11
Sydney Kapp	Digital Marketing Specialist	Cheyenne, Wyoming	27	**American Revolution**	35	93. Arctic Circle – Austin defeats Sydney (Ep. 12)	1	N/A	Episode 12
Tim Wood	Content Creator	South Portland, Maine	51	**Sportscasters**	84	94. Geometry – Jacob defeats Tim (Ep. 12)	1	N/A	Episode 12
Austin Williams	AI Engineer	North Pole, Alaska	31	**Arctic Circle**; American Revolution	25	93. Arctic Circle – Austin defeats Sydney (Ep. 12); 95. American Revolution – Jacob defeats Austin (Ep. 12)	2	N/A	Episode 12
Jacob Derwin	Events Producer	Akron, Ohio	29	**Beatles Songs**; Roman Numerals; Geometry; Sportscasters	11	77. Leather – Jacob defeats Gary (Ep. 10); 91. Beatles Songs – Jacob defeats Rick (Ep. 11); 92. Roman Numerals – Jacob defeats Kurt (Ep. 11); 94. Geometry – Jacob defeats Tim (Ep. 12); 95. American Revolution – Jacob defeats Austin (Ep. 12); 96. Paleontology – Molly defeats Jacob (Ep. 12)	6	N/A	Episode 12
Molly Sperling	Community Development Planner	Owensboro, Kentucky	30	**Paleontology**; Sportscasters	9	15. Variety Acts – Molly defeats Heather (Ep. 2); 96. Paleontology – Molly defeats Jacob (Ep. 12); 97. Biology – Nicole defeats Molly (Ep. 12)	3	N/A	Episode 12
Nicole Parker	Nurse Practitioner	Kansas City, Missouri	33	**Biology**; Sportscasters	43	85. Dentist Office – Nicole defeats Bailey (Ep. 11); 97. Biology – Nicole defeats Molly (Ep. 12); 98. Bones – Josh defeats Nicole (Ep. 12)	3	N/A	Episode 12
Josh Katz	Accountant	Springdale, Arkansas	30	**Playing Cards**; Bones; Sportscasters	88	38. Playing Cards – Josh defeats Tania (Ep. 5); 98. Bones – Josh defeats Nicole (Ep. 12); 99. Ancient Greece – Ashley defeats Josh (0–1) (Ep. 12); 100. Sportscasters – Ashley defeats Josh (0–2) (Ep. 12)	4	N/A	Episode 12
Ashley Washburn	Communications Coordinator	Litchfield, Illinois	26	**Witchcraft**; Ancient Greece	89	59. Witchcraft – Ashley defeats Josh (Ep. 7); 60. Country Music Awards – Ashley defeats Mark (Ep. 8); 61. Canadian Icons – Ashley defeats Sadia (Ep. 8); 99. Ancient Greece – Ashley defeats Josh (1–0) (Ep. 12); 100. Sportscasters – Ashley defeats Josh (2–0) (Ep. 12)	5	**Season Winner** **($250,000)**	

Color key:

This person was the winner
This person was the runner-up
This person won the duel
This person won the duel and the Time Boost
This person, who used the Time Boost, won the duel
This person won the duel and the Category Steal
This person won the duel with the Golden Square
This person lost the duel
This person, who used the Time Boost, lost the duel
This person did not duel

Standings (Season 4)
Contestant	Game																																																																																																			
Contestant	Episode 1								Episode 2								Episode 3									Episode 4									Episode 5								Episode 6								Episode 7									Episode 8									Episode 9								Episode 10								Episode 11								Episode 12							
Contestant	1	2	3	4	5	6	7	8	9	10	11	12	13	14	15	16	17	18	19	20	21	22	23	24	25	26	27	28	29	30	31	32	33	34	35	36	37	38	39	40	41	42	43	44	45	46	47	48	49	50	51	52	53	54	55	56	57	58	59	60	61	62	63	64	65	66	67	68	69	70	71	72	73	74	75	76	77	78	79	80	81	82	83	84	85	86	87	88	89	90	91	92	93	94	95	96	97	98	99	100
Ashley Washburn																																																											WIN	WIN	WIN																																						WIN	**WINNER**
Josh Katz																																						WIN																																																												WIN	LOSE	RUNNER-UP
Nicole Parker																																																																	WIN												WIN	OUT																						
Molly Sperling															WIN																																																																	WIN	OUT																			
Jacob Derwin																																																																	WIN														WIN	WIN		WIN	WIN	OUT																
Austin Williams																																																																	WIN		OUT																																	
Tim Wood																																																																	OUT																																			
Sydney Kapp																																																																	OUT																																			
Kurt Libby																																																																	OUT																																			
Rick Kadile	WIN																																																																	WIN	OUT																																	
Jezrael Luckett																																																																	WIN	WIN	OUT																																	
Clara Meinershagen																																																																	WIN			OUT																																
Valerie Ong																																																																	WIN			WIN	OUT																															
Jeremy Johnston																																																																	OUT																																			
Courtney Mckee																																																																	OUT																																			
Bailey Sager																																																																	OUT																																			
Matt Pappadia																																					WIN																																														WIN	OUT																
Armand Fruge																																																																	WIN	WIN	OUT																																	
Bradley "Brad" Felty																		WIN																																																																OUT																		
Julie Johnson																																																																	WIN														WIN	WIN	OUT																			
Jason Bige Burnett																										WIN																														WIN																								OUT																				
Nicki Abare																																																																	WIN	OUT																																		
Laz Martino																																																																	WIN		OUT																																	
Gary Waldron McGinnis																																																																	OUT																																			
Marques Bottorf																																																																	WIN					WIN	OUT																													
Rick Overdorff																																																																	WIN	WIN	OUT																																	
Lukas Taylor																																																																	WIN		OUT																																	
Anshpreet Kaur																																																																	OUT																																			
Jonathan Braylock																																																	WIN	WIN	WIN											WIN	WIN	WIN							WIN	OUT																												
Zach Dickey																																																																	OUT																																			
Ben Mason																																																																	WIN	WIN	OUT																																	
Frank Deryck-Linstruth																																																																	WIN		OUT																																	
Haley Ponthieux																																																																	OUT																																			
Jasmine Polintan																																																																	WIN	OUT																																		
Emily Wingfield																																																																	OUT																																			
Jonny Poswulski																																																																	OUT																																			
Andrea Tuason																																																																OUT																																				
LaTasha Cooper																																																															OUT																																					
Sergio Reid																																																														OUT																																						
Sadia Khan																																																													OUT																																							
Mark Hudson																																																												OUT																																								
Josh Rogers																																																										WIN	OUT																																									
Debbie Lou Lmt																																																									WIN	OUT																																										
Aaron Hernandez																																																									OUT																																											
Rebecca Flicher																																																						WIN	WIN	OUT																																												
Demetrice Jones					WIN																																																		OUT																																													
Eric Walukonis																																																				WIN	WIN	OUT																																														
Jeff Mladic																																																					OUT																																															
Andre Bland																																																				OUT																																																
Ashton Hamby																																				WIN															OUT																																																	
Bob Deschenes																																																		OUT																																																		
Charlie DeLuca																																																WIN	OUT																																																			
Luke Jobe							WIN																																								WIN	OUT																																																				
Kelsey Buchholz																																													WIN	WIN	OUT																																																					
Christina Hazen																	WIN																													OUT																																																						
Elizabeth Benefield																																							WIN	WIN	WIN	WIN		WIN	OUT																																																							
Mark Borison																																											WIN	OUT																																																								
Liliana Cervantes																																											OUT																																																									
Aaron Dozzi																												WIN	WIN	WIN	WIN	WIN	WIN	WIN								OUT																																																										
Cibelle Burgos						WIN																																			OUT																																																											
Leigh Chesnut																																								OUT																																																												
Arlene Santiago																																			WIN				OUT																																																													
Tania Pritz																																						OUT																																																														
Shelby Black																																					OUT																																																															
Dorian Hunter																																				OUT																																																																
Idecia Chapman																																			OUT																																																																	
Ashley Rivera																							WIN	WIN	WIN									OUT																																																																		
Katelyn Perkins Lott													WIN																				OUT																																																																			
Harley Banker																																OUT																																																																				
Victoria TBD																															OUT																																																																					
Kristi Raab																														OUT																																																																						
King Bo																													OUT																																																																							
Megan Graves																											WIN	OUT																																																																								
Carlheb Cemesca																											OUT																																																																									
Tom Roels																										OUT																																																																										
Kyle Remillard																									OUT																																																																											
Ty Gabby																WIN								OUT																																																																												
Erin Walker																					WIN	WIN	OUT																																																																													
Kristy Joy Browning																						OUT																																																																														
Sam Kubernick																				WIN	OUT																																																																															
Kiera Cheyenne																			WIN	OUT																																																																																
Bo Bice																			OUT																																																																																	
Dash Anderson																		OUT																																																																																		
Domenic Murgo																	OUT																																																																																			
Tim Mooney											WIN			WIN		OUT																																																																																				
Heather Felder															OUT																																																																																					
Delante Murrell														OUT																																																																																						
David Cowan												WIN	OUT																																																																																							
Brittany Richardson												OUT																																																																																								
Marcia Pace		WIN							WIN	WIN	OUT																																																																																									
Evan D. Stein										OUT																																																																																										
Jonny Fairplay								WIN	OUT																																																																																											
Kwame Impraim								OUT																																																																																												
Justin Call				WIN			OUT																																																																																													
Ricky Pugalee						OUT																																																																																														
Jackie TBD					OUT																																																																																															
Frank Eddie			WIN	OUT																																																																																																
Laura Fuller-Mills			OUT																																																																																																	
Elizabeth Grandchamp		OUT																																																																																																		
Chuck "Charlie" Nasty	OUT																																																																																																			

=== Season 5 ===
On March 26, 2026, Amazing Race: Season 32 Winner James Wallington announced he would appear as a contestant on Season 5 of the show, as well as Voice Actor Kyle Phillips.

Results (Season 5)
Name	Job	City	Age	Category	Space Assignment	Duels	Duels Played	Episodes Won	Exited
Shanra Smith	Real Estate Agent	Upland, California	38	**Sitcom Characters**	11	1. Sitcom Characters – Jonathan defeats Shanra (Ep. 1)	1	N/A	Episode 1
Jonathan Walker	Editor at Governmental Agency	Prince George's County, Maryland	39	**Sundae Toppings**	21	1. Sitcom Characters – Jonathan defeats Shanra (Ep. 1); 2. Pool Party – Taj defeats Jonathan (Ep. 1)	2	N/A	Episode 1
Sean O'Connor	Executive Director of Non-Profit	Newport, Rhode Island	43	**Engineering Marvels**	55	3. Female Pioneers – Ashlin defeats Sean (Ep. 1)	1	N/A	Episode 1
Ashlin Watkins	Office Manager	Dallas, Texas	28	**Female Pioneers**; Engineering Marvels	56	3. Female Pioneers – Ashlin defeats Sean (Ep. 1); 4. Office Supplies – Cierra defeats Ashlin (Ep. 1)	2	N/A	Episode 1
Jerrol Wallace	Nurse Anesthetist	Brooklyn, New York	52	**Seafood**	66	5. Seafood – Cierra defeats Jerrol (Ep. 1)	1	N/A	Episode 1
Vanessa Cianci Saenz	Guest Relations	Miami, Florida	39	**Sexiest Man Alive**	58	6. Carbonated Beverages – David defeats Vanessa (Ep. 1)	1	N/A	Episode 1
Alan McDonel	Retired Nuclear Engineer	Yuma, Arizona	65	**Family Bands**	15	7. Grilling – Ahmad defeats Alan (Ep. 1)	1	N/A	Episode 1
Cierra Britton	School Dean	Colorado Springs, Colorado	29	**Office Supplies**; Engineering Marvels	57	4. Office Supplies – Cierra defeats Ashlin (Ep. 1); 5. Seafood – Cierra defeats Jerrol (Ep. 1); 8. Engineering Marvels – Deon defeats Cierra (Ep. 1)	3	N/A	Episode 1
Ella Direnfeld	Market Research Analyst	Maui, Hawaii	26	**Train Travel**	35	9. Train Travel – Bryan defeats Ella (Ep. 2)	1	N/A	Episode 2
Greg Jackson	Print Company Owner	Pompano Beach, Florida	41	**Bowling**	62	10. Bowling – Mark defeats Greg (Ep. 2)	1	N/A	Episode 2
Brooke Camhi	Attorney	Lynbrook, New York	44	**Time Magazine Covers**	63	11. Time Magazine Covers – Mark defeats Brooke (Ep. 2)	1	N/A	Episode 2
Michelle Poll	Broker	Ina, Illinois	46	**Household Chores**	51	12. Household Chores – Mark defeats Michelle (Ep. 2)	1	N/A	Episode 2
Justin Rondeau	Marketing Director	Austin, Texas	38	**Iconic Sayings**	30	13. Lord of the Rings – Kristin defeats Justin (Ep. 2)	1	N/A	Episode 2
Terilisha Godwin-Pierce	Reality TV Personality	Dallas, Texas	38	**Classic Toys**	53	14. Classic Toys – Mike defeats Terilisha (Ep. 2)	1	N/A	Episode 2
Katelyn "Kat" Flowers Prevot	Chemical Engineer	Wichita, Kansas	31	**Dance Movies**	68	15. Sexiest Man Alive – David defeats Kat (Ep. 2)	1	N/A	Episode 2
Brad "Attitude" Greene	Pro Wrestler	Boone, North Carolina	41	**Balls** (Zoomed Duel)	19	16. Box Office Hits – Ryan defeats Brad (Ep. 2)	1	N/A	Episode 2
Ryan Radakovich	Delivery Driver	Whitmore Lake, Michigan	40	**Box Office Hits**; Balls (Zoomed Duel)	18	16. Box Office Hits – Ryan defeats Brad (Ep. 2); 17. Iconic Sayings – Kristin defeats Ryan (Ep. 3)	2	N/A	Episode 3
Kristin Overly	Copywriter	Boston, Massachusetts	33	**Lord of the Rings**; Iconic Sayings; Balls (Zoomed Duel)	20	13. Lord of the Rings – Kristin defeats Justin (Ep. 2); 17. Iconic Sayings – Kristin defeats Ryan (Ep. 3); 18. Kids Party – Eric defeats Kristin (Ep. 3)	3	N/A	Episode 3
Jenny Grosschadl	Technology Project Manager	Milwaukee, Wisconsin	31	**Gaming**	40	19. Gaming – Eric defeats Jenny (Ep. 3)	1	N/A	Episode 3
Ja'Meisha Lanae Watson	Master Loctician	Birmingham, Alabama	44	**Kitchen Tools**	28	20. Kitchen Tools – Eric defeats Ja'Meisha (Ep. 3)	1	N/A	Episode 3
Shawn Washart	Academic Advisor	Bellmawr, New Jersey	34	**Bobbleheads**	5	21. Bobbleheads – Kim defeats Shawn (Ep. 3)	1	N/A	Episode 3
Anastasia Lyons	Banker	Springfield, Illinois	38	**LEGO**	82	22. Baked Dishes – Rebecca defeats Anastasia (Ep. 3)	1	N/A	Episode 3
Lawrenzo Howell	PhD Student	Chicago, Illinois	29	**Roman Empire**	41	23. One-Name Stars – Gigi defeats Lawrenzo (Ep. 3)	1	N/A	Episode 3
Gigi Nejad	Kindergarten Teacher	Orlando, Florida	45	**One-Name Stars**; Roman Empire	42	23. One-Name Stars – Gigi defeats Lawrenzo (Ep. 3); 24. Famous Dogs – Wook defeats Gigi (Ep. 3)	2	N/A	Episode 3
Wook Kim	Realtor	San Diego, California	56	**Famous Dogs**; Roman Empire	32	24. Famous Dogs – Wook defeats Gigi (Ep. 3); 25. New Year's Eve – Kayla defeats Wook (Ep. 3)	2	N/A	Episode 3
Kayla Simpson	Wedding Photographer	Redlands, California	34	**New Year's Eve**; Roman Empire	22	25. New Year's Eve – Kayla defeats Wook (Ep. 3); 26. Tattoos – Josh defeats Kayla (Ep. 4)	2	N/A	Episode 4
Josh Eckert	Content Creator	Canton, Connecticut	31	**Tattoos**; Roman Empire	31	26. Tattoos – Josh defeats Kayla (Ep. 4); 27. Sundae Toppings – Taj defeats Josh (Ep. 4)	2	N/A	Episode 4
Nikki Lyons	Hair Stylist	Reno, Nevada	38	**Eco-Friendly Living**	8	28. Balls – Eric defeats Nikki (Ep. 4)	1	N/A	Episode 4
Maria Baker	Graduate Student	Dover, New Jersey	29	**World Soccer**	38	29. World Soccer – Eric defeats Maria (Ep. 4)	1	N/A	Episode 4
Taneya Walker	Instructionals Designer	Huntsville, Alabama	40	**Home Remedies**	27	30. Home Remedies – Victor defeats Taneya (Ep. 4)	1	N/A	Episode 4
David Alexander	Sales Manager	Atlanta, Georgia	35	**Carbonated Beverages**; Sexiest Man Alive; Dance Movies	48	6. Carbonated Beverages – David defeats Vanessa (Ep. 1); 15. Sexiest Man Alive – David defeats Kat (Ep. 2); 31. Dance Movies – Melanie defeats David (Ep. 4)	3	N/A	Episode 4
Ryan Lambert	Actor/Musician	Cleveland, Ohio	54	**Scary Movies**	96	32. Scary Movies – Liz defeats Ryan (Ep. 4)	1	N/A	Episode 4
Abdul Cokley	Marketing Analyst	Chicago, Illinois	23	**Emojis**	74	33. Comedy Headliners – Kristen defeats Abdul (Ep. 4)	1	N/A	Episode 4
Kristen Bolger	Claims Consultant	Sibley, Iowa	59	**Comedy Headliners**; Emojis	75	33. Comedy Headliners – Kristen defeats Abdul (Ep. 4); 34. Doctor's Office – Mallory defeats Kristen (Ep. 5)	2	N/A	Episode 5
Mallory Hernandez	Medical Device Sales	Fishers, Indiana	25	**Doctor's Office**; Emojis	85	34. Doctor's Office – Mallory defeats Kristen (Ep. 5); 35. Emojis – Kay defeats Mallory (Ep. 5)	2	N/A	Episode 5
Kay Proctor	Community Volunteer	Heppner, Oregon	70	**Oregon Trail**	84	35. Emojis – Kay defeats Mallory (Ep. 5); 36. Vegetable Garden – Lissette defeats Kay (Ep. 5)	2	N/A	Episode 5
Arianny Sturla	Practice Manager	Miami, Florida	52	**Iconic Eyes** (Close-Up Duel)	71	37. Iconic Eyes – Erin defeats Arianny (Ep. 5)	1	N/A	Episode 5
Rebecca Warren	High School Teacher	Raleigh, North Carolina	26	**Baked Dishes**; LEGO	72	22. Baked Dishes – Rebecca defeats Anastasia (Ep. 3); 38. LEGO – Erin defeats Rebecca (Ep. 5)	2	N/A	Episode 5
Nwamaka Imasogie	Social Media Associate	Houston, Texas	27	**Coming-Of-Age TV**	94	39. Coming-Of-Age TV – Meg defeats Nwamaka (Ep. 5)	1	N/A	Episode 5
Lissette Perez	Human Resources Director	Clewiston, Florida	42	**Vegetable Garden** (Close-Up Duel); Oregon Trail	95	36. Vegetable Garden – Lissette defeats Kay (Ep. 5); 40. Oregon Trail – Meg defeats Lissette (Ep. 5)	2	N/A	Episode 5
Meg McGuffin	Fraternity & Sorority Advisor	Ozark, Alabama	32	**Pageants**	93	39. Coming-of-Age TV – Meg defeats Nwamaka (Ep. 5); 40. Oregon Trail – Meg defeats Lissette (Ep. 5); 41. Bravo Stars – Paige defeats Meg (Ep. 5)	3	N/A	Episode 5
Kiley Luckett	Social Worker	Lawrence, Kansas	37	**Romance Movies**	83	42. Romance Movies – Paige defeats Kiley (Ep. 6)	1	N/A	Episode 6
Reggie Howard	Machine Operator	Charlotte, North Carolina	66	**Machines** (Audio Duel)	86	43. Machines – Paige defeats Reggie (Ep. 6)	1	N/A	Episode 6
Will Toledo	Professor of Education	Fullerton, California	38	**Air Travel**	89	44. Air Travel – Kristen defeats Will (Ep. 6)	1	N/A	Episode 6
Emmanuel Matadi	Professional Sprinter	Monrovia, Liberia	33	**Track & Field**	78	45. Track & Field – Kristen defeats Emmanuel (Ep. 6)	1	N/A	Episode 6
Melanie Williams	Mortgage Loan Owner	Alpharetta, Georgia	34	**Book Club**	59	31. Dance Movies – Melanie defeats David (Ep. 4); 46. Book Club – Kristen defeats Melanie (Ep. 6)	2	N/A	Episode 6
Deon Bush	Water Damage Restoration Specialist	LaPlace, Louisiana	50	**~~Barbie~~ (Stolen by Kristen)**; Halftime Shows	67	8. Engineering Marvels – Deon defeats Cierra (Ep. 1); 47. Halftime Shows – Kristen defeats Deon (Ep. 6)	2	Episode 1 Episode 2; 5 spaces ($40,000)	Episode 6
Austin Foate	Inventory Manager	Mount Clemens, Michigan	26	**Arithmetic**	98	48. Spa Day – Ren defeats Austin (Ep. 6)	1	N/A	Episode 6
Rachel S. Gardner	Physician Assistant	New York City	31	**ABBA**	46	49. Barbie – Kristen defeats Rachel (Ep. 6)	1	N/A	Episode 6
Madison Zurcher	Graduate Student	Sherwood, Oregon	25	**Black & White Movies**	2	50. Roman Empire – Taj defeats Madison (Ep. 6)	1	N/A	Episode 6
Taj Adams	Student	Hamilton, New Jersey	22	**Pool Party**; Sundae Toppings; Roman Empire; Black & White Movies	1	2. Pool Party – Taj defeats Jonathan (Ep. 1); 27. Sundae Toppings – Taj defeats Josh (Ep. 4); 50. Roman Empire – Taj defeats Madison (Ep. 6); 51. Ad Slogans – Kelita defeats Taj (Ep. 7)	4	N/A	Episode 7
Michael Hale	Accounting Manager	Helena, Montana	47	**Summer**	13	52. Summer – Kelita defeats Michael (Ep. 7)	1	N/A	Episode 7
Ahmad Akkad	Retail Store Owner	Bothell, Washington	35	**Grilling**; Family Bands	14	7. Grilling – Ahmad defeats Alan (Ep. 1); 53. Family Bands – Kelita defeats Ahmad (Ep. 7)	2	N/A	Episode 7
Mike Ross	Commercial Fuels Sales	El Dorado, Arkansas	41	**Gas Stations**	52	14. Classic Toys – Mike defeats Terilisha (Ep. 2); 54. Black & White Movies – Kelita defeats Mike (Ep. 7)	2	N/A	Episode 7
Kelita Samone	Realtor	Freeland, Michigan	46	**Ad Slogans**; Black & White Movies; Gas Stations	3	51. Ad Slogans – Kelita defeats Taj (Ep. 7); 52. Summer – Kelita defeats Michael (Ep. 7); 53. Family Bands – Kelita defeats Ahmad (Ep. 7); 54. Black & White Movies – Kelita defeats Mike (Ep. 7); 55. Music Class – Dean defeats Kelita (Ep. 7)	5	N/A	Episode 7
Kristen Berset-Harris	TV Host/Journalist	St. Petersburg, Florida	43	**~~Halftime Shows~~**; Barbie (Stolen from Deon); ABBA	88	44. Air Travel – Kristen defeats Will (Ep. 6); 45. Track & Field – Kristen defeats Emmanuel (Ep. 6); 46. Book Club – Kristen defeats Melanie (Ep. 6); 47. Halftime Shows – Kristen defeats Deon (Ep. 6); 49. Barbie – Kristen defeats Rachel (Ep. 6); 56. ABBA – Jess defeats Kristen (Ep. 7)	6	Episode 6; 13 spaces ($20,000)	Episode 7
Leslie Graham Andrews	Entrepreneur	Atlanta, Georgia	58	**Nocturnal Animals**	79	57. Nocturnal Animals – Jess defeats Leslie (Ep. 7)	1	N/A	Episode 7
Jess Alanis	Government Relations	St. Paul, Minnesota	33	**Global News**	69	56. ABBA – Jess defeats Kristen (Ep. 7); 57. Nocturnal Animals – Jess defeats Leslie (Ep. 7); 58. Crochet Items – Morgan defeats Jess (Ep. 7)	3	N/A	Episode 7
Morgan Okonkwo	Swim Instructor	Hampton, Virginia	31	**Crochet Items**; Global News	60	58. Crochet Items – Morgan defeats Jess (Ep. 7); 59. Renaissance Faire – Steven defeats Morgan (Ep. 8)	2	Split Episode 7; 16 Spaces ($10,000)	Episode 8
Tracy Parham	History Teacher	Atlanta, Georgia	51	**World Religions**	37	60. Nuts and Seeds – Victor defeats Tracy (Ep. 8)	1	N/A	Episode 8
Kyle Phillips	Voice Actor & Content Creator	Detroit, Michigan	38	**Voice Actors**	70	61. Voice Actors – Lauren defeats Kyle (Ep. 8)	1	N/A	Episode 8
Dexter McKinney Jr.	Actor/Content Creator	Brooklyn, New York	39	**Festivals**	90	62. Action Heroes – Anthony defeats Dexter (Ep. 8)	1	N/A	Episode 8
Steven Anthony Lawrence	Actor	Fresno, California	34	**Renaissance Faire**; Global News	49	59. Renaissance Faire – Steven defeats Morgan (Ep. 8); 63. Global News – Anthony defeats Steven (Ep. 8)	2	N/A	Episode 8
Demetria Thomas	Registered Nurse	New York City	36	**Barbershop**	16	64. U.S. Abbreviations – Kayleigh defeats Demetria (Ep. 8)	1	N/A	Episode 8
Carlo Mendez	Actor	Los Angeles, California	46	**Celebrity Siblings**	36	65. Festivals – Anthony defeats Carlo (Ep. 8)	1	N/A	Episode 8
Anthony Gordon	Educator	Converse, Texas	47	**Action Heroes**; Festivals; Celebrity Siblings	100	62. Action Heroes – Anthony defeats Dexter (Ep. 8); 63. Global News – Anthony defeats Steven (Ep. 8); 65. Festivals – Anthony defeats Carlo (Ep. 8); 66. Arithmetic – Ren defeats Anthony (Ep. 8)	4	N/A	Episode 8
Ren Keane	Admissions Representative	Seattle, Washington	29	**Spa Day**; Arithmetic; Celebrity Siblings	99	48. Spa Day – Ren defeats Austin (Ep. 6); 66. Arithmetic – Ren defeats Anthony (Ep. 8); 67. Birdwatching – Carlos defeats Ren (Ep. 9)	3	Episode 8; 22 spaces ($20,000)	Episode 9
Carlos Correa Jr.	Tech Consultant	Chicago, Illinois	50	**Birdwatching**; Celebrity Siblings	65	67. Birdwatching – Carlos defeats Ren (Ep. 9); 68. Nature Sounds – Patrick defeats Carlos (Ep. 9)	2	N/A	Episode 9
Manny	Retired	Sun City West, Arizona	68	**Woodworking**	47	69. Woodworking – Patrick defeats Manny (Ep. 9)	1	N/A	Episode 9
James T. Williams III	Cell Phone Salesman	Las Vegas, Nevada	47	**Pie Flavors**	87	70. Pie Flavors – Patrick defeats James (Ep. 9)	1	N/A	Episode 9
Donelle Maryn Parker	Bar Manager	Painesville, Ohio	37	**Cocktails** (Association Duel)	10 (Episodes 1–7); 9 (Note: Donelle's single tile could only challenge Jason after Eric's territory was frozen, so she couldn't challenge another player after her first duel. As a result, Jason and Donelle were both moved to the nearest open bordering squares (Jason to square 8 and Donelle to square 9) so they could still challenge other players after their first duel. This caused Eric to remove square 8 as part of his territory (as it was now claimed by Jason) and claim square 10 as part of his territory (as Donelle's original square was now empty, and she was moved to square 9).)(Episodes 8–9)	71. Banking – Jason defeats Donelle (Ep. 9)	1	N/A	Episode 9
Jason Bowen	Senior Financial Analyst	Saratoga Springs, New York	43	**Banking**; Cocktails (Association Duel)	9 (Episodes 1–7); 8 (Note: Jason's single tile could only challenge Donelle after Eric's territory was frozen, so he couldn't challenge another player after his first duel. As a result, Jason and Donelle were both moved to the nearest open bordering squares (Jason to square 8 and Donelle to square 9) so they could still challenge other players after their first duel. This caused Eric to remove square 8 as part of his territory (as it was now claimed by Jason) and claim square 10 as part of his territory (as Donelle's original square was now empty, and she was moved to square 9).)(Episodes 8–9)	71. Banking – Jason defeats Donelle (Ep. 9); 72. Ocean Predators – Sean defeats Jason (Ep. 9)	2	N/A	Episode 9
Dean Aamodt	Retired Music Educator	Fargo, North Dakota	68	**Music Class**; Gas Stations	33	55. Music Class – Dean defeats Kelita (Ep. 7); 73. Gas Stations – Jonathan defeats Dean (Ep. 9)	2	Split Episode 7; 16 Spaces ($10,000)	Episode 9
Jordan H. Davis	Professional Public Speaker	Wilmington, Delaware	25	**Rookie of the Year**	43	74. Rookie of the Year – Jonathan defeats Jordan (Ep. 9)	1	N/A	Episode 9
Jonathan Pettibone	Real Estate Agent	Newport Beach, California	34	**Golf**	12	73. Gas Stations – Jonathan defeats Dean (Ep. 9); 74. Rookie of the Year – Jonathan defeats Jordan (Ep. 9); 75. Basketball Players – Carolyn defeats Jonathan (Ep. 9)	3	N/A	Episode 9
Lana Klein	Model	San Diego, California	22	**Handbags**	45	76. Hardware Store – Bryan defeats Lana (Ep. 10)	1	N/A	Episode 10
Bryan	Waste Water Collections Worker	Guam	38	**Hardware Store**; Handbags	34	9. Train Travel – Bryan defeats Ella (Ep. 2); 76. Hardware Store – Bryan defeats Lana (Ep. 10); 77. Handbags – Sierra defeats Bryan (Ep. 10)	3	N/A	Episode 10
Patrick Williams	Farmer	Glenrock, Wyoming	31	**Nature Sounds** (Audio Duel); Celebrity Siblings	39	68. Nature Sounds – Patrick defeats Carlos (Ep. 9); 69. Woodworking – Patrick defeats Manny (Ep. 9); 70. Pie Flavors – Patrick defeats James (Ep. 9); 78. Celebrity Siblings – Sierra defeats Patrick (Ep. 10)	4	Episode 9; 26 spaces ($20,000)	Episode 10
Neesh Riaz	Radio Personality	New York City	32	**Reality TV Winners**	76	79. Reality TV Winners – James defeats Neesh (Ep. 10)	1	N/A	Episode 10
Rebeckah Daniell	Advertising Producer	Los Angeles, California	35	**Robots**	54	80. Internet Slang – Isabel defeats Rebeckah (Ep. 10)	1	N/A	Episode 10
Isabel Reyna	Model	Charlotte, North Carolina	25	**Internet Slang**; Robots	44	80. Internet Slang – Isabel defeats Rebeckah (Ep. 10); 81. Disney Live-Action – Sierra defeats Isabel (Ep. 10)	2	N/A	Episode 10
Ngozi Elobuike	Wine Club Founder	Stockton, California	26	**Wine Tasting**	23	82. Greek Life – Kelcie defeats Ngozi (Ep. 10)	1	N/A	Episode 10
Edith "Edie" Fenton	Former Teacher	Denver, Colorado	54	**Yacht Rock**	91	83. Pageants – Paige defeats Edie (Ep. 10)	1	N/A	Episode 10
Daniel Gorham	Plumber	Simsbury, Connecticut	22	**Plumbing**	64	84. Plumbing – Paige defeats Dan (Ep. 11)	1	N/A	Episode 11
Sierra Herd	Video Game Streamer	Tulsa, Oklahoma	29	**Disney Live-Action**; Robots	25	77. Handbags – Sierra defeats Bryan (Ep. 10); 78. Celebrity Siblings – Sierra defeats Patrick (Ep. 10); 81. Disney Live-Action – Sierra defeats Isabel (Ep. 10); 85. Robots – Paige defeats Sierra (Ep. 11)	4	Episode 10; 32 spaces ($20,000)	Episode 11
Jim Clements	Executive Director of Non-Profit	Omaha, Nebraska	48	**National Parks Postcards**	73	86. Biopics – Mark defeats Jim (Ep. 11)	1	N/A	Episode 11
Paige Michelle Taylor	Photographer	Bowling Green, Kentucky	32	**Bravo Stars**; Pageants; Yacht Rock	92	41. Bravo Stars – Paige defeats Meg (Ep. 5); 42. Romance Movies – Paige defeats Kiley (Ep. 6); 43. Machines – Paige defeats Reggie (Ep. 6); 83. Pageants – Paige defeats Edie (Ep. 10); 84. Plumbing – Paige defeats Dan (Ep. 11); 85. Robots – Paige defeats Sierra (Ep. 11); 87. Yacht Rock – Mark defeats Paige (Ep. 11)	7	N/A	Episode 11
Carolyn Swords	Product Manager	Portland, Oregon	36	**Basketball Players**; Golf	4	75. Basketball Players – Carolyn defeats Jonathan (Ep. 9); 88. Golf – Mark defeats Carolyn (Ep. 11)	2	N/A	Episode 11
Michael Clemons	Attorney	Nashville, Tennessee	48	**Celebrity Santas**	50	89. National Parks Postcards – Mark defeats Michael (Ep. 11)	1	N/A	Episode 11
Liz Wiest	Production Coordinator	New York City	28	**Disney Muppets**	97	32. Scary Movies – Liz defeats Ryan (Ep. 4); 90. Celebrity Santas – Mark defeats Liz (Ep. 11)	2	N/A	Episode 11
Kimberly Barnett Cox	Educator	Miami, Florida	53	**Legendary Lines**	6	21. Bobbleheads – Kim defeats Shawn (Ep. 3); 91. Legendary Lines – Mark defeats Kim (Ep. 11)	2	N/A	Episode 11
Mark Gurrieri	Clinical Researcher	Boise, Idaho	48	**Biopics**; National Parks Postcards; Celebrity Santas; Disney Muppets	61	10. Bowling – Mark defeats Greg (Ep. 2); 11. Time Magazine Covers – Mark defeats Brooke (Ep. 2); 12. Household Chores – Mark defeats Michelle (Ep. 2); 86. Biopics – Mark defeats Jim (Ep. 11); 87. Yacht Rock – Mark defeats Paige (Ep. 11); 88. Golf – Mark defeats Carolyn (Ep. 11); 89. National Parks Postcards – Mark defeats Michael (Ep. 11); 90. Celebrity Santas – Mark defeats Liz (Ep. 11); 91. Legendary Lines – Mark defeats Kim (Ep. 11); 92. Cocktails – Sean defeats Mark (Ep. 11)	10	N/A	Episode 11
Sean Johnson	Tour Guide	Anchorage, Alaska	35	**Ocean Predators**; Cocktails (Association Duel); Disney Muppets	7	72. Ocean Predators – Sean defeats Jason (Ep. 9); 92. Cocktails – Sean defeats Mark (Ep. 11); 93. Wine Tasting – Kelcie defeats Sean (Ep. 12)	3	Episode 11; 76 spaces ($20,000)	Episode 12
Kelcie Morris	Student	Paragould, Arkansas	20	**Greek Life**; Wine Tasting; Disney Muppets	24	82. Greek Life – Kelcie defeats Ngozi (Ep. 10); 93. Wine Tasting – Kelcie defeats Sean (Ep. 12); 94. Barbershop – Kayleigh defeats Kelcie (Ep. 12)	3	N/A	Episode 12
Kayleigh Theresa	Grad Student	Waterboro, Maine	25	**U.S. Abbreviations**; Barbershop; Disney Muppets	17	64. U.S. Abbreviations – Kayleigh defeats Demetria (Ep. 8); 94. Barbershop – Kayleigh defeats Kelcie (Ep. 12); 95. World Religions – Victor defeats Kayleigh (Ep. 12)	3	N/A	Episode 12
Eric Bond	Sales	Las Vegas, Nevada	35	**Kids Party**; Balls (Close-Up Duel); Eco-Friendly Living	29	18. Kids Party – Eric defeats Kristin (Ep. 3); 19. Gaming – Eric defeats Jenny (Ep. 3); 20. Kitchen Tools – Eric defeats Ja'Meisha (Ep. 3); 28. Balls – Eric defeats Nikki (Ep. 4); 29. World Soccer – Eric defeats Maria (Ep. 4); 96. Eco-Friendly Living – Victor defeats Eric (Ep. 12)	6	Episode 3; 7 spaces Episode 4 Episode 5; 9 spaces ($60,000)	Episode 12
Eric Bond	Sales	Las Vegas, Nevada	35	**Kids Party**; Balls (Close-Up Duel); Eco-Friendly Living	29	18. Kids Party – Eric defeats Kristin (Ep. 3); 19. Gaming – Eric defeats Jenny (Ep. 3); 20. Kitchen Tools – Eric defeats Ja'Meisha (Ep. 3); 28. Balls – Eric defeats Nikki (Ep. 4); 29. World Soccer – Eric defeats Maria (Ep. 4); 96. Eco-Friendly Living – Victor defeats Eric (Ep. 12)	6	Episode 7 Frozen (5 duel wins); Episode 11; Unfrozen (After Duel 89)	Episode 12
Victor Cai	Product Manager	North Attleboro, Massachusetts	25	**Nuts & Seeds**; World Religions; Disney Muppets	26	30. Home Remedies – Victor defeats Taneya (Ep. 4); 60. Nuts and Seeds – Victor defeats Tracy (Ep. 8); 95. World Religions – Victor defeats Kayleigh (Ep. 12); 96. Eco-Friendly Living – Victor defeats Eric (Ep. 12); 97. Cruise Destinations – Erin defeats Victor (Ep. 12)	5	N/A	Episode 12
Erin Weigand	Cruise Director	Pottstown, Pennsylvania	34	**Cruise Destinations**; Disney Muppets	81	37. Iconic Eyes – Erin defeats Arianny (Ep. 5); 38. LEGO – Erin defeats Rebecca (Ep. 5); 97. Cruise Destinations – Erin defeats Victor (Ep. 12); 98. Disney Muppets – James defeats Erin (Ep. 12)	4	N/A	Episode 12
James Wallington	Travel Advisor	Grand Rapids, Michigan	35	**Country Flags**	77	79. Reality TV Winners – James defeats Neesh (Ep. 10); 98. Disney Muppets – James defeats Erin (Ep. 12); 99. Country Flags – James defeats Lauren (1–0) (Ep. 12); 100. Soap Operas – Lauren defeats James (1–1) (Ep. 12); 101. Glassware – Lauren defeats James (1–2) (Ep. 12)	5	N/A	Episode 12
Lauren Wise Samet	Stay-At-Home Mom	Mount Pleasant, South Carolina	46	**Soap Operas**	80	61. Voice Actors – Lauren defeats Kyle (Ep. 8); 99. Country Flags – James defeats Lauren (0–1) (Ep. 12); 100. Soap Operas – Lauren defeats James (1–1) (Ep. 12); 101. Glassware – Lauren defeats James (2–1) (Ep. 12)	4	**Season Winner** **($250,000)**	

Color key:

This person was the winner
This person was the runner-up
This person won the duel
This person won the duel and the Time Boost
This person, who used the Time Boost, won the duel
This person won the duel and the Category Steal
This person lost the duel
This person, who used the Time Boost, lost the duel
This person did not duel

Standings (Season 5)
Contestant	Game																																																																																																				
Contestant	Episode 1								Episode 2								Episode 3									Episode 4								Episode 5								Episode 6									Episode 7								Episode 8								Episode 9									Episode 10								Episode 11									Episode 12								
Contestant	1	2	3	4	5	6	7	8	9	10	11	12	13	14	15	16	17	18	19	20	21	22	23	24	25	26	27	28	29	30	31	32	33	34	35	36	37	38	39	40	41	42	43	44	45	46	47	48	49	50	51	52	53	54	55	56	57	58	59	60	61	62	63	64	65	66	67	68	69	70	71	72	73	74	75	76	77	78	79	80	81	82	83	84	85	86	87	88	89	90	91	92	93	94	95	96	97	98	99	100	101
Lauren Wise Samet																																																													WIN																																						LOSE	WIN	**WINNER**
James Wallington																																																																	WIN																			WIN	WIN	LOSE	RUNNER-UP														
Erin Weigand																																					WIN	WIN																																																											WIN	OUT			
Victor Cai																														WIN																														WIN																																			WIN	WIN	OUT				
Eric Bond																		WIN	WIN	WIN								WIN	WIN																																																																	OUT							
Kayleigh Theresa																																																																WIN																														WIN	OUT						
Kelcie Morris																																																																	WIN											WIN	OUT																								
Sean Johnson																																																																	WIN																				WIN	OUT															
Mark Gurrieri										WIN	WIN	WIN																																																																	WIN	WIN	WIN	WIN	WIN	WIN	OUT																		
Kimberly Barnett Cox																					WIN																																																																	OUT															
Liz Wiest																																WIN																																																										OUT											
Michael Clemons																																																																	OUT																																				
Carolyn Swords																																																																	WIN													OUT																							
Paige Michelle Taylor																																									WIN	WIN	WIN																																								WIN	WIN	WIN		OUT														
Jim Clements																																																																	OUT																																				
Sierra Herd																																																																	WIN	WIN			WIN				OUT																												
Daniel Gorham																																																																	OUT																																				
Edith "Edie" Fenton																																																																	OUT																																				
Ngozi Elobuike																																																																	OUT																																				
Isabel Reyna																																																																	WIN	OUT																																			
Rebeckah Daniell																																																																	OUT																																				
Neesh Riaz																																																																	OUT																																				
Patrick Williams																																																																	WIN	WIN	WIN								OUT																										
Bryan									WIN																																																																	WIN	OUT																										
Lana Klein																																																																	OUT																																				
Jonathan Pettibone																																																																	WIN	WIN	OUT																																		
Jordan H. Davis																																																																	OUT																																				
Dean Aamodt																																																							WIN																		OUT																												
Jason Bowen																																																																	WIN	OUT																																			
Donelle Maryn Parker																																																																	OUT																																				
James T. Williams III																																																																	OUT																																				
Manny																																																																	OUT																																				
Carlos Correa Jr.																																																																	WIN	OUT																																			
Ren Keane																																																WIN																		WIN	OUT																																		
Anthony Gordon																																																														WIN	WIN		WIN	OUT																																			
Carlo Mendez																																																																	OUT																																				
Demetria Thomas																																																																OUT																																					
Steven Anthony Lawrence																																																											WIN				OUT																																						
Dexter McKinney Jr.																																																														OUT																																							
Kyle Phillips																																																													OUT																																								
Tracy Parham																																																												OUT																																									
Morgan Okonkwo																																																										WIN	OUT																																										
Jess Alanis																																																								WIN	WIN	OUT																																											
Leslie Graham Andrews																																																									OUT																																												
Kristen Berset-Harris																																												WIN	WIN	WIN	WIN		WIN							OUT																																													
Kelita Samone																																																			WIN	WIN	WIN	WIN	OUT																																														
Mike Ross														WIN																																								OUT																																															
Ahmad Akkad							WIN																																														OUT																																																
Michael Hale																																																				OUT																																																	
Taj Adams		WIN																									WIN																							WIN	OUT																																																		
Madison Zurcher																																																		OUT																																																			
Rachel S. Gardner																																																	OUT																																																				
Austin Foate																																																OUT																																																					
Deon Bush								WIN																																							OUT																																																						
Melanie Williams																															WIN															OUT																																																							
Emmanuel Matadi																																													OUT																																																								
Will Toledo																																												OUT																																																									
Reggie Howard																																											OUT																																																										
Kiley Luckett																																										OUT																																																											
Meg McGuffin																																							WIN	WIN	OUT																																																												
Lissette Perez																																				WIN				OUT																																																													
Nwamaka Imasogie																																							OUT																																																														
Rebecca Warren																						WIN																OUT																																																															
Arianny Sturla																																					OUT																																																																
Kay Proctor																																			WIN	OUT																																																																	
Mallory Hernandez																																		WIN	OUT																																																																		
Kristen Bolger																																	WIN	OUT																																																																			
Abdul Cokley																																	OUT																																																																				
Ryan Lambert																																OUT																																																																					
David Alexander						WIN									WIN																OUT																																																																						
Taneya Walker																														OUT																																																																							
Maria Baker																													OUT																																																																								
Nikki Lyons																												OUT																																																																									
Josh Eckert																										WIN	OUT																																																																										
Kayla Simpson																									WIN	OUT																																																																											
Wook Kim																								WIN	OUT																																																																												
Gigi Nejad																							WIN	OUT																																																																													
Lawrenzo Howell																							OUT																																																																														
Anastasia Lyons																						OUT																																																																															
Shawn Washart																					OUT																																																																																
Ja'Meisha Lanae Watson																				OUT																																																																																	
Jenny Grosschadl																			OUT																																																																																		
Kristin Overly													WIN				WIN	OUT																																																																																			
Ryan Radakovich																WIN	OUT																																																																																				
Brad "Attitude" Greene																OUT																																																																																					
Katelyn "Kat" Flowers Prevot															OUT																																																																																						
Terilisha Godwin-Pierce														OUT																																																																																							
Justin Rondeau													OUT																																																																																								
Michelle Poll												OUT																																																																																									
Brooke Camhi											OUT																																																																																										
Greg Jackson										OUT																																																																																											
Ella Direnfeld									OUT																																																																																												
Cierra Britton				WIN	WIN			OUT																																																																																													
Alan McDonel							OUT																																																																																														
Vanessa Cianci Saenz						OUT																																																																																															
Jerrol Wallace					OUT																																																																																																
Ashlin Watkins			WIN	OUT																																																																																																	
Sean O'Connor			OUT																																																																																																		
Jonathan Walker	WIN	OUT																																																																																																			
Shanra Smith	OUT																																																																																																				

=== Season 6 ===
On September 1, 2026, online personality Dan Ryckert confirmed he would be appearing as a contestant on the show's sixth season. Later on, all the contestants were announced.

Results (Season 6)
Name	Job/Title	City	Age	Category	Space Assignment	Duels	Duels Played	Episodes Won	Exited
James Kurfess	Yale Service Medal of Honor Winner	New Haven, Connecticut	39	**K-Pop Artists**	24	1. Mini Golf – Jena defeats James (Ep. 1)	1	N/A	Episode 1
Geneviéve Flati	Puppeteering Champion	Westminster, California	35	**Sesame Street**	34	2. Peanuts Gang – Fatima defeats Geneviève (Ep. 1)	1	N/A	Episode 1
Jena Antonucci	Triple Crown Winner	Ocala, Florida	50	**Mini Golf**; K-Pop Artists	25	1. Mini Golf – Jena defeats James (Ep. 1); 3. K-Pop Artists – Fatima defeats Jena (Ep. 1)	2	N/A	Episode 1
Riley Lufkin	Lego Building Champion	Atlanta, Georgia	24	**Laundry**	72	4. ...Ologies – Dr. Tre defeats Riley (Ep. 1)	1	N/A	Episode 1
Brad Leighninger	BBQ World Champion	Nixa, Missouri	52	**Charcuterie Board**	11	5. Measurements – Sabrina defeats Brad (Ep. 1)	1	N/A	Episode 1
Fatima Dominguez	Essay Writing Champion	Vallejo, California	40	**Peanuts Gang**; Sesame Street	44	2. Peanuts Gang – Fatima defeats Geneviève (Ep. 1); 3. K-Pop Artists – Fatima defeats Jena (Ep. 1); 6. Sesame Street – Shawn defeats Fatima (Ep. 1)	3	N/A	Episode 1
Jake Hoot	The Voice Winner	Lebanon, Tennessee	37	**Home Improvement**	93	7. Home Improvement – Ethan defeats Jake (Ep. 1)	1	N/A	Episode 1
Ethan Greenburg	Race to Survive Winner	Salt Lake City, Utah	34	**Après-Ski**	83	7. Home Improvement – Ethan defeats Jake (Ep. 1); 8. Borrowed Words – Wellington defeats Ethan (Ep. 1)	2	N/A	Episode 1
Bella Bergmark	NCAA Volleyball Champion	Austin, Texas	25	**Perfumes**	67	9. Preschool – Elizabeth defeats Bella (Ep. 2)	1	N/A	Episode 2
Savana Walker	Rodeo Champion	Cooper, Texas	26	**State Animals**	29	10. Muscles – Shamir defeats Savana (Ep. 2)	1	N/A	Episode 2
Shamir Peshewa	Car Jitsu Champion	Knoxville, Tennessee	40	**Muscles**; State Animals	39	10. Muscles – Shamir defeats Savana (Ep. 2); 11. Jumping – Henry defeats Shamir (Ep. 2)	2	N/A	Episode 2
James Batey	Race to the Center of the Earth Winner	Vashon Island, Washington	42	**Action Sports**	38	12. Action Sports – Henry defeats James (Ep. 2)	1	N/A	Episode 2
Dr. Tre	Toastmasters Champion	Stone Mountain, Georgia	54	**...Ologies**; Laundry	71	4. ...Ologies – Dr. Tre defeats Riley (Ep. 1); 13. Laundry – Guenther defeats Dr. Tre (Ep. 2)	2	N/A	Episode 2
Paige Vincent	Storm Photograph of the Year	Denver, Colorado	35	**Christmas Ornaments** (Zoomed Duel)	82	14. Christmas Ornaments – Guenther defeats Paige (Ep. 2)	1	N/A	Episode 2
Wellington Lyons	Maine Pro Bono Counsel Honoree	Brunswick, Maine	43	**Borrowed Words**; Après-Ski	94	8. Borrowed Words – Wellington defeats Ethan (Ep. 1); 15. Aprés-Ski – Guenther defeats Wellington (Ep. 2)	2	N/A	Episode 2
Craig Childress	HVAC Champion	Peabody, Massachusetts	40	**Safety Gear**	60	16. Compost – Travis defeats Craig (Ep. 2)	1	N/A	Episode 2
Scott Henry	Tough as Nails Champion	Ogden, Utah	45	**Y2K Stars**	89	17. Y2K Stars – Frankie defeats Scott (Ep. 3)	1	N/A	Episode 3
Matt Szeto	U.S. National Yo-Yo Champion	Phoenix, Arizona	26	**The Lincoln Era**	41	18. Protein – Adrian defeats Matt (Ep. 3)	1	N/A	Episode 3
Adrian Read	Worst Cooks in America Season 17 Winner	Bronx, New York	36	**Protein**; The Lincoln Era	42	18. Protein – Adrian defeats Matt (Ep. 3); 19. DMV – Tailour defeats Adrian (Ep. 3)	2	N/A	Episode 3
Tailour Wells	Oratorical Champion	Dallas, Texas	27	**DMV**; The Lincoln Era	43	19. DMV – Tailour defeats Adrian (Ep. 3); 20. Famous Vehicles – Shawn defeats Tailour (Ep. 3)	2	N/A	Episode 3
Lari Lavigne	Fantasy Football League Champion	Savannah, Georgia	65	**Estate Sale**	76	21. Hasbro Games – Morgan defeats Lari (Ep. 3)	1	N/A	Episode 3
Gabi Dixson	Grip Strength Champion	Portland, Oregon	34	**Strength**	53	22. Animal Calls – Eddie defeats Gabi (Ep. 3)	1	N/A	Episode 3
Shawn Diddy	Miss Iowa USA 1997	Owatonna, Minnesota	56	**Famous Vehicles**; The Lincoln Era	45	6. Sesame Street – Shawn defeats Fatima (Ep. 1); 20. Famous Vehicles – Shawn defeats Tailour (Ep. 3); 23. The Lincoln Era – Eddie defeats Shawn (Ep. 3)	3	Episode 1; 5 spaces ($20,000)	Episode 3
Elizabeth Barrick	Guys Grocery Games Winner	Charlotte, North Carolina	47	**Preschool**; Perfumes	68	9. Preschool – Elizabeth defeats Bella (Ep. 2); 24. Perfumes – Moumita defeats Elizabeth (Ep. 3)	2	N/A	Episode 3
Hannah Klien	World Equestrian Champion	Cincinnati, Ohio	34	**Horses**	88	25. Ballet – Avery defeats Hannah (Ep. 3)	1	N/A	Episode 3
Avery Wilson	Mr. United States	Baton Rouge, Louisiana	44	**Ballet**; Horses	87	25. Ballet – Avery defeats Hannah (Ep. 3); 26. Out of Business – Denise defeats Avery (Ep. 4)	2	N/A	Episode 4
Denise Kohnke	Wisconsin Advertising Hall of Fame	Milwaukee, Wisconsin	69	**Out of Business**; Horses	97	26. Out of Business – Denise defeats Avery (Ep. 4); 27. Heated Rivalries – Sydney defeats Denise (Ep. 4)	2	N/A	Episode 4
Audrey Eckert	Miss USA	Lincoln, Nebraska	23	**Athleisure**	37	28. Bakery – Melanie defeats Audrey (Ep. 4)	1	N/A	Episode 4
Melanie Bjork-Jensen	Food Network Champion	West Jordan, Utah	32	**Bakery**; Athleisure	27	28. Bakery – Melanie defeats Audrey (Ep. 4); 29. Weaponry – Dustin defeats Melanie (Ep. 4)	2	N/A	Episode 4
Dustin Brooks	Armored Combat World Champion	Charlton, Massachusetts	33	**Weaponry**; Athleisure	28	29. Weaponry – Dustin defeats Melanie (Ep. 4); 30. Vacation Destinations – Tyler defeats Dustin (Ep. 4)	2	N/A	Episode 4
Eddie Penev	NCAA & World Cup Gymnast	Rochester, New York	35	**Animal Calls**; Strength	54	22. Animal Calls – Eddie defeats Gabi (Ep. 3); 23. The Lincoln Era – Eddie defeats Shawn (Ep. 3); 31. Strength – Tyler defeats Eddie (Ep. 4)	3	Episode 3; 10 spaces ($20,000)	Episode 4
Tyler Lucas	Beast Games season 2 Winner	Sumter, South Carolina	33	**Vacation Destinations**; Athleisure	26	30. Vacation Destinations – Tyler defeats Dustin (Ep. 4); 31. Strength – Tyler defeats Eddie (Ep. 4); 32. State Fair – Catalina defeats Tyler (Ep. 4)	3	N/A	Episode 4
Michael Quaka	Water Purifier Sales Champion	Denver, Colorado	56	**MLB**	65	33. Field Trips – Blake defeats Michael (Ep. 4)	1	N/A	Episode 4
Maeve Tuma	Dance Team Champion	Charlottesville, Virginia	20	**Souvenirs**	56	34. Souvenirs – Blake defeats Maeve (Ep. 5)	1	N/A	Episode 5
Blake Baird	Mushroom Identifier Champion	Kent, Washington	37	**Field Trips**; MLB	66	33. Field Trips – Blake defeats Michael (Ep. 4); 34. Souvenirs – Blake defeats Maeve (Ep. 5); 35. Guinness World Records – Dan defeats Blake (Ep. 5)	3	N/A	Episode 5
Catalina Langlitz	WBRO World Champion	Salado, Texas	24	**State Fair**; Athleisure	16	32. State Fair – Catalina defeats Tyler (Ep. 4); 36. Athleisure – Jonathan defeats Catalina (Ep. 5)	2	Episode 4; 15 spaces ($20,000)	Episode 5
Sam Kavanaugh	Jeopardy! Tournament of Champions Winner	Carlton, Michigan	35	**Zombies**	80	37. Zombies – Meredith defeats Sam (Ep. 5)	1	N/A	Episode 5
Valerie Helper	State Fair Quilting Champion	Covington, Virginia	65	**Needle Crafting**	6	38. Physical Education – Colin defeats Valerie (Ep. 5)	1	N/A	Episode 5
Amber Clark	Flag Football Gold Champion	Saganah, Michigan	33	**Sports Positions**	100	39. Retirement Hobbies – Mike defeats Amber (Ep. 5)	1	N/A	Episode 5
Jonathan Roops	Caesar's Texas Hold 'Em Champion	Wichita, Kansas	44	**Trades**	14	36. Athleisure – Jonathan defeats Catalina (Ep. 5); 40. Trades – Fred defeats Jonathan (Ep. 5)	2	N/A	Episode 5
AnnMarie Macko	Broward County Best Hairdresser	Fort Lauderdale, Florida	45	**MTV Shows**	18	41. Eating Competitions – Michelle defeats AnnMarie (Ep. 5)	1	N/A	Episode 5
Xavier Prather	Big Brother season 23 Winner	Kalamazoo, Michigan	31	**NBA & WNBA Logos**	84	42. Shipwrecks – Guenther defeats Xavier (Ep. 6)	1	N/A	Episode 6
Ariel Thompson	Miss Black USA	Louisville, Kentucky	27	**Bedroom Items**	92	43. Bedroom Items – Guenther defeats Ariel (Ep. 6)	1	N/A	Episode 6
Miles Krajewski	Para Badminton World Champion	Yankton, South Dakota	20	**Hotels**	81	44. Hotels – Guenther defeats Miles (Ep. 6)	1	N/A	Episode 6
Ashley Nocera	Pro Fitness Bikini Model	Woodbridge, New Jersey	31	**Italian Cuisine**	91	45. Italian Cuisine – Guenther defeats Ashley (Ep. 6)	1	N/A	Episode 6
Ivan Bosnjak	Tri-State DJ of the Year	Boardman, Ohio	25	**Buttons**	2	46. Pigs – Allie defeats Ivan (Ep. 6)	1	N/A	Episode 6
E.G. Daily	Josie Music Icon Award Winner	Los Angeles, California	64	**Famous Babies**	58	47. Famous Babies – Jason defeats E.G. (Ep. 6)	1	N/A	Episode 6
Rashaad Santiago	Winner of Syfy's Face Off Season 6	Little Ferry, New Jersey	38	**Face Painting**	69	48. Safety Gear – Travis defeats Rashaad (Ep. 6)	1	N/A	Episode 6
Jaii (Jasmine) Harris	Female Barber Champion	Flowery Branch, Georgia	35	**Facial Hair**	13	49. Facial Hair – Eric defeats Jaii (Ep. 6)	1	N/A	Episode 6
Troy Michael	Mr. Gay World 2023	Anchorage, Alaska	39	**Celebrity Halloween**	35	50. The Lion King – Krystle defeats Troy (Ep. 6)	1	N/A	Episode 6
Krystle Starr	LEGO Masters Winner	Plano, Texas	37	**The Lion King**; Celebrity Halloween	36	50. The Lion King – Krystle defeats Troy (Ep. 6); 51. Birthday Parties - Caitlin defeats Krystle (Ep. 7)	2	N/A	Episode 7
Jaleen Roberts	Paralympian Track & Field Champion	San Diego, California	27	**Paralympic Events**	57	52. Southern Cookin' – Jason defeats Jaleen (Ep. 7)	1	N/A	Episode 7
Mikayla Moore	Motorcycle Racing Champion	Upper Marlboro, Maryland	22	**Racing Events**	63	53. Racing Events – Laila defeats Mikayla (Ep. 7)	1	N/A	Episode 7
Katie Bone	American Ninja Warrior Winner	Denver, Colorado	20	**Battle Games**	20	54. Female Olympians – Deborah defeats Katie (Ep. 7)	1	N/A	Episode 7
Merideth "Mer" Olson	National Clogging Champion	Alamogordo, New Mexico	26	**Newsweek Covers**	9	55. Wine Making – Adam defeats Merideth (Ep. 7)	1	N/A	Episode 7
Michelle Lesco	Nathan's Hot Dog Eating Champion	Tuscon, Arizona	42	**Eating Competitions**; MTV Shows	17	41. Eating Competitions – Michelle defeats AnnMarie (Ep. 5); 56. MTV Shows - Adam defeats Michelle (Ep. 7)	2	N/A	Episode 7
Adam Larson	The Challenge Winner	Greenville, South Carolina	47	**Wine Making**; Newsweek Covers	8	55. Wine Making – Adam defeats Merideth (Ep. 7); 56. MTV Shows - Adam defeats Michelle (Ep. 7); 57. WNBA & NBA Logos – Malachi defeats Adam (Ep. 7)	3	N/A	Episode 7
Callie Junkins	High School Battle of the Bands Champion	Presque Isle, Maine	20	**Album of the Year**	32	58. Album of the Year – Nelson defeats Callie (Ep. 7)	1	N/A	Episode 7
Fred Roberts	Alpha Phi Alpha Step Champion	Charlotte, North Carolina	51	**Famous Scammers**	33	40. Trades – Fred defeats Jonathan (Ep. 5); 59. Famous Scammers - Nelson defeats Fred (Ep. 8)	2	Episode 5 Episode 6 Episode 7; 17 spaces ($60,000)	Episode 8
Colin Cummings	Air Hockey World Champion	Honolulu, Hawaii	27	**Physical Education**; Needle Crafting	5	38. Physical Education – Colin defeats Valerie (Ep. 5); 60. Needle Crafting - Nelson defeats Colin (Ep. 8)	2	N/A	Episode 8
Victor Jih	The Amazing Race Winner	Los Angeles, California	52	**International Cities** (Association Duel)	61	61. Photography – Guenther defeats Victor (Ep. 8)	1	N/A	Episode 8
Ashley Landerman	Holiday Baking Champion	New Braunfels, Texas	40	**Art History**	85	62. Art History – Jessica defeats Ashley (Ep. 8)	1	N/A	Episode 8
Henry Cabelus	World Champion Extreme Pogo	Long Beach, California	26	**Jumping**; State Animals	49	11. Jumping – Henry defeats Shamir (Ep. 2); 12. Action Sports – Henry defeats James (Ep. 2); 63. State Animals – Jessabelle defeats Henry (Ep. 8)	3	N/A	Episode 8
LeVreese Davis	Texas State Point Sparring Champion	San Antonio, Texas	28	**Nickelodeon Shows**	15	64. Area Codes – Nelson defeats LeVreese (Ep. 8)	1	N/A	Episode 8
Carole Vandever	NCAA Bracket Pool Winner	Indianapolis, Indiana	69	**Airport Reads**	74	65. Estate Sale – Morgan defeats Carole (Ep. 8)	1	N/A	Episode 8
James Canty III	World Champion Chessboxer	Shelby Township, Michigan	33	**Chess**	52	66. Nickelodeon Shows – Nelson defeats James (Ep. 8)	1	N/A	Episode 8
Guenther Oka	Wakeboarding World Champion	Orlando, Florida	27	**Shipwrecks**; ~~NBA & WNBA Logos~~; Photography (Stolen from Malachi); International Cities (Association Duel)	62	13. Laundry – Guenther defeats Dr. Tre (Ep. 2); 14. Christmas Ornaments – Guenther defeats Paige (Ep. 2); 15. Aprés-Ski – Guenther defeats Wellington (Ep. 2); 42. Shipwrecks – Guenther defeats Xavier (Ep. 6); 43. Bedroom Items – Guenther defeats Ariel (Ep. 6); 44. Hotels – Guenther defeats Miles (Ep. 6); 45. Italian Cuisine – Guenther defeats Ashley (Ep. 6); 61. Photography - Guenther defeats Victor (Ep. 8); 67. International Cities – Nelson defeats Guenther (Ep. 8)	9	Episode 2; 7 spaces ($20,000)	Episode 8
Cole Young	Taxidermy Champion	Greenwood, New York	TBA	**Taxidermy**	1	TBA. TBA – TBA defeats TBA (Ep. TBA)	TBA	TBA	TBA
Allie Staples	Swine Showing Champion	Morris, Minnesota	18	**Pigs**; Buttons	3	46. Pigs – Allie defeats Ivan (Ep. 6)	1	TBA	TBA
Meryl Federman	Teen Jeopardy Winner	Jersey City, New Jersey	TBA	**Shakespeare Plays**	4	TBA. TBA – TBA defeats TBA (Ep. TBA)	TBA	TBA	TBA
Jim Hautman	Federal Duck Stamp Champion	Chaska, Minnesota	TBA	**Ducks**	7	TBA. TBA – TBA defeats TBA (Ep. TBA)	TBA	TBA	TBA
Malachi Gibbs	Ohio State Track & Field Champion	Youngstown, Ohio	21	**~~Photography~~ (Stolen by Guenther)**; NBA & WNBA Logos; Newsweek Covers	10	57. WNBA & NBA Logos – Malachi defeats Adam (Ep. 7)	1	TBA	TBA
Eric Melin	Air Guitar World Champion	Carmichael, California	54	**Hair Band Hits**	12	49. Facial Hair – Eric defeats Jaii (Ep. 6)	1	TBA	TBA
Deb Milani	Women's NCAA Lacrosse Champion	Catonsville, Maryland	31	**Female Olympians**; Battle Games	19	54. Female Olympians – Deborah defeats Katie (Ep. 7)	1	TBA	TBA
Sabrina Monserate-Lindsay	Speed Puzzling Champion	Durham, North Carolina	29	**Measurements**; Charcuterie Board	21	5. Measurements – Sabrina defeats Brad (Ep. 1)	1	TBA	TBA
Dave Elliott	World Burger Champion	Olathe, Kansas	TBA	**Hot Dogs**	22	TBA. TBA – TBA defeats TBA (Ep. TBA)	TBA	TBA	TBA
Joe Wos	Emmy Award-Winning Host of Cartoon Academy	Oakmont, Pennsylvania	TBA	**Brand Icons**	23	TBA. TBA – TBA defeats TBA (Ep. TBA)	TBA	TBA	TBA
Jessica Penne	MMA Champion	San Diego, California	43	**Martial Arts**	30	TBA. TBA – TBA defeats TBA (Ep. TBA)	TBA	TBA	TBA
Nelson Dellis	USA Memory Champion	Saratoga Springs, New York	42	**Area Codes**; Nickelodeon Shows; Chess	31	58. Album of the Year – Nelson defeats Callie (Ep. 7); 59. Famous Scammers - Nelson defeats Fred (Ep. 8); 60. Needle Crafting - Nelson defeats Colin (Ep. 8); 64. Area Codes – Nelson defeats LeVreese (Ep. 8); 66. Nickelodeon Shows – Nelson defeats James (Ep. 8); 67. International Cities – Nelson defeats Guenther (Ep. 8)	6	Episode 8; 35 spaces ($20,000)	TBA
Jared Guynes	Nerf Ultra Championship Winner	Rockwall, Texas	TBA	**Build-A-Bear**	40	TBA. TBA – TBA defeats TBA (Ep. TBA)	TBA	TBA	TBA
Caitlin Escobar	Irish Dancing Champion	Dublin, Ireland	33	**Birthday Parties**; Celebrity Halloween	46	51. Birthday Parties – Caitlin defeats Krystle (Ep. 7)	1	TBA	TBA
Beau Autin	USKA Karaoke Champion	Dallas, Texas	TBA	**Karaoke Songs**	47	TBA. TBA – TBA defeats TBA (Ep. TBA)	TBA	TBA	TBA
Jason Smith	Food Network Star Winner	London, Kentucky	48	**Southern Cookin'**; Paralympic Events	48	47. Famous Babies – Jason defeats E.G. (Ep. 6); 52. Southern Cookin' – Jason defeats Jaleen (Ep. 7)	2	TBA	TBA
Jessabelle Thunder	Miss Exotic World Queen of Burlesque	Los Angeles, California	41	**Burlesque**	50	63. State Animals – Jessabelle defeats Henry (Ep. 8)	1	TBA	TBA
Tommy Cherry	Rubik's Cube Blindfolded World Record Holder	Ledgewood, New Jersey	21	**Brain Games**	51	TBA. TBA – TBA defeats TBA (Ep. TBA)	TBA	TBA	TBA
Dan Ryckert	Guinness World Records Title-Holder	Olathe, Kansas	41	**Guinness World Records**; MLB	55	35. Guinness World Records – Dan defeats Blake (Ep. 5)	1	TBA	TBA
Tiana Nihipali	Volleyball Coach of Champions	Honolulu, Hawaii	TBA	**Hawaii**	59	TBA. TBA – TBA defeats TBA (Ep. TBA)	TBA	TBA	TBA
Zack VanDreese	2x USA Beatbox Champion	Cincinnati, Ohio	TBA	**Energy**	64	TBA. TBA – TBA defeats TBA (Ep. TBA)	TBA	TBA	TBA
Travis Gienger	World Champion Pumpkin Grower	Anoka, Minnesota	45	**Compost**; Safety Gear; Face Painting	70	16. Compost – Travis defeats Craig (Ep. 2); 48. Safety Gear – Travis defeats Rashaad (Ep. 6)	2	TBA	TBA
Laila Ghambari	US Barista Champion	Portland, Oregon	38	**Latte Art**	73	53. Racing Events – Laila defeats Mikayla (Ep. 7)	1	TBA	TBA
Morgan Simianer	2x Cheerleading Champion	Dallas, Texas	28	**Hasbro Games**; Estate Sale; Airport Reads	75	21. Hasbro Games – Morgan defeats Lari (Ep. 3); 65. Estate Sale – Morgan defeats Carole (Ep. 8)	2	TBA	TBA
Moumita Khondaker	Miss NY Intercontinental	New York City, New York	31	**Chemistry**	77	24. Perfumes – Moumita defeats Elizabeth (Ep. 3)	1	TBA	TBA
Ricky Rotandi	The Amazing Race Season 36 Winner	New York City, New York	TBA	**Broadway Shows**	78	TBA. TBA – TBA defeats TBA (Ep. TBA)	TBA	TBA	TBA
Meredith Host	Best in Show Pottery Champion	Kansas City, Missouri	46	**Ceramics**	79	37. Zombies – Meredith defeats Sam (Ep. 5)	1	TBA	TBA
Sydney Trem	Hot Dog Derby Champion	Cleveland, Ohio	25	**Heated Rivalries**; Horses	86	27. Heated Rivalries – Sydney defeats Denise (Ep. 4)	1	TBA	TBA
Frankie Cena	World Champion Debate Coach	Burbank, California	34	**Math Symbols**	90	17. Y2K Stars – Frankie defeats Scott (Ep. 3)	1	TBA	TBA
Jessica Haas	Speed Painting Champion	Olive Branch, Mississippi	35	**Tickets**	95	62. Art History – Jessica defeats Ashley (Ep. 8)	1	TBA	TBA
Jada Wooten	Netflix's Cheer Champion	Atlanta, Georgia	TBA	**Cheerleading**	96	TBA. TBA – TBA defeats TBA (Ep. TBA)	TBA	TBA	TBA
Kevin McCants	2025 State Games of Tennessee 100 Meter Dash Champion	Nashville, Tennessee	TBA	**Phonetic Alphabet**	98	TBA. TBA – TBA defeats TBA (Ep. TBA)	TBA	TBA	TBA
Mike Pettigrew	State Senior Discus Champion	North Myrtle Beach, South Carolina	69	**Retirement Hobbies**; Sports Positions	99	39. Retirement Hobbies – Mike defeats Amber (Ep. 5)	1	TBA	TBA

Color key:

This person was the winner
This person was the runner-up
This person won the duel
This person won the duel and the Time Boost
This person, who used the Time Boost, won the duel
This person won the duel and the Category Steal
This person won the duel and the Power Shot
This person lost the duel
This person, who used the Time Boost, lost the duel
This person did not duel

Standings (Season 6)
Contestant	Game																																																																										
Contestant	Episode 1								Episode 2								Episode 3									Episode 4								Episode 5								Episode 6									Episode 7								Episode 8									Episode 9							
Contestant	1	2	3	4	5	6	7	8	9	10	11	12	13	14	15	16	17	18	19	20	21	22	23	24	25	26	27	28	29	30	31	32	33	34	35	36	37	38	39	40	41	42	43	44	45	46	47	48	49	50	51	52	53	54	55	56	57	58	59	60	61	62	63	64	65	66	67	68	69	70	71	72	73	74	75
TBA	TBA	TBA	TBA	TBA	TBA	TBA	TBA	TBA	TBA	TBA	TBA	TBA	TBA	TBA	TBA	TBA	TBA	TBA	TBA	TBA	TBA	TBA	TBA	TBA	TBA	TBA	TBA	TBA	TBA	TBA	TBA	TBA	TBA	TBA	TBA	TBA	TBA	TBA	TBA	TBA	TBA	TBA	TBA	TBA	TBA	TBA	TBA	TBA	TBA	TBA	TBA	TBA	TBA	TBA	TBA	TBA	TBA	TBA	TBA	TBA	TBA	TBA	TBA	TBA	TBA	TBA	TBA	TBA	TBA	TBA	TBA	TBA	TBA	TBA	TBA
Jessabelle Thunder																																																															WIN					TBA	TBA	TBA	TBA	TBA	TBA	TBA	TBA
Jessica Haas																																																														WIN						TBA	TBA	TBA	TBA	TBA	TBA	TBA	TBA
Nelson Dellis																																																										WIN	WIN	WIN				WIN		WIN	WIN	TBA	TBA	TBA	TBA	TBA	TBA	TBA	TBA
Malachi Gibbs																																																									WIN											TBA	TBA	TBA	TBA	TBA	TBA	TBA	TBA
Deb Milani																																																						WIN														TBA	TBA	TBA	TBA	TBA	TBA	TBA	TBA
Laila Ghambari																																																					WIN															TBA	TBA	TBA	TBA	TBA	TBA	TBA	TBA
Caitlin Escobar																																																			WIN																	TBA	TBA	TBA	TBA	TBA	TBA	TBA	TBA
Eric Melin																																																	WIN																			TBA	TBA	TBA	TBA	TBA	TBA	TBA	TBA
Jason Smith																																															WIN					WIN																TBA	TBA	TBA	TBA	TBA	TBA	TBA	TBA
Allie Staples																																														WIN																						TBA	TBA	TBA	TBA	TBA	TBA	TBA	TBA
Mike Pettigrew																																							WIN																													TBA	TBA	TBA	TBA	TBA	TBA	TBA	TBA
Meredith Host																																					WIN																															TBA	TBA	TBA	TBA	TBA	TBA	TBA	TBA
Dan Ryckert																																			WIN																																	TBA	TBA	TBA	TBA	TBA	TBA	TBA	TBA
Sydney Trem																											WIN																																									TBA	TBA	TBA	TBA	TBA	TBA	TBA	TBA
Moumita Khondaker																								WIN																																												TBA	TBA	TBA	TBA	TBA	TBA	TBA	TBA
Morgan Simianer																					WIN																																												WIN			TBA	TBA	TBA	TBA	TBA	TBA	TBA	TBA
Frankie Cena																	WIN																																																			TBA	TBA	TBA	TBA	TBA	TBA	TBA	TBA
Travis Gienger																WIN																																WIN																				TBA	TBA	TBA	TBA	TBA	TBA	TBA	TBA
Sabrina Monserate-Lindsay					WIN																																																															TBA	TBA	TBA	TBA	TBA	TBA	TBA	TBA
Guenther Oka													WIN	WIN	WIN																											WIN	WIN	WIN	WIN																WIN						OUT								
James Canty III																																																																	OUT										
Carole Vandever																																																																	OUT										
LeVreese Davis																																																																OUT											
Henry Cabelus											WIN	WIN																																																			OUT												
Ashley Landerman																																																														OUT													
Victor Jih																																																													OUT														
Colin Cummings																																						WIN																						OUT															
Fred Roberts																																								WIN																			OUT																
Callie Junkins																																																										OUT																	
Adam Larson																																																							WIN	WIN	OUT																		
Michelle Lesco																																									WIN															OUT																			
Merideth "Mer" Olson																																																							OUT																				
Katie Bone																																																						OUT																					
Mikayla Moore																																																					OUT																						
Jaleen Roberts																																																				OUT																							
Krystle Starr																																																		WIN	OUT																								
Troy Michael																																																		OUT																									
Jaii (Jasmine) Harris																																																	OUT																										
Rashaad Santiago																																																OUT																											
E.G. Daily																																															OUT																												
Ivan Bosnjak																																														OUT																													
Ashley Nocera																																													OUT																														
Miles Krajewski																																												OUT																															
Ariel Thompson																																											OUT																																
Xavier Prather																																										OUT																																	
AnnMarie Macko																																									OUT																																		
Jonathan Roops																																				WIN				OUT																																			
Amber Clark																																							OUT																																				
Valerie Helper																																						OUT																																					
Sam Kavanaugh																																					OUT																																						
Catalina Langlitz																																WIN				OUT																																							
Blake Baird																																	WIN	WIN	OUT																																								
Maeve Tuma																																		OUT																																									
Michael Quaka																																	OUT																																										
Tyler Lucas																														WIN	WIN	OUT																																											
Eddie Penev																						WIN	WIN								OUT																																												
Dustin Brooks																													WIN	OUT																																													
Melanie Bjork-Jensen																												WIN	OUT																																														
Audrey Eckert																												OUT																																															
Denise Kohnke																										WIN	OUT																																																
Avery Wilson																									WIN	OUT																																																	
Hannah Klien																									OUT																																																		
Elizabeth Barrick									WIN															OUT																																																			
Shawn Diddy						WIN														WIN			OUT																																																				
Gabi Dixson																						OUT																																																					
Lari Lavigne																					OUT																																																						
Tailour Wells																			WIN	OUT																																																							
Adrian Read																		WIN	OUT																																																								
Matt Szeto																		OUT																																																									
Scott Henry																	OUT																																																										
Craig Childress																OUT																																																											
Wellington Lyons								WIN							OUT																																																												
Paige Vincent														OUT																																																													
Dr. Tre				WIN									OUT																																																														
James Batey												OUT																																																															
Shamir Peshewa										WIN	OUT																																																																
Savana Walker										OUT																																																																	
Bella Bergmark									OUT																																																																		
Ethan Greenburg							WIN	OUT																																																																			
Jake Hoot							OUT																																																																				
Fatima Dominguez		WIN	WIN			OUT																																																																					
Brad Leighninger					OUT																																																																						
Riley Lufkin				OUT																																																																							
Jena Antonucci	WIN		OUT																																																																								
Geneviéve Flati		OUT																																																																									
James Kurfess	OUT																																																																										

== Duels ==
Color key
Contestant won the duel
Contestant lost the duel and was eliminated (The final three-part duel requires two losses to be eliminated)
Contestant was the runner-up
Contestant won the season
Contestant won the duel and a time boost (Season 2 onwards)
Contestant won the duel and chose to steal a category (Season 4 onwards)
Contestant won the duel and chose to use the power shot (Season 6 onwards)
Contestant won a duel featuring the golden square (Season 4)
Contestant used the time boost and won the duel (Season 2 onwards)
Contestant used the time boost, lost the duel and was eliminated (Season 2 onwards)

=== Season 1 ===
Week 1 (January 2, 2024): Top 81 – 7 Duels

First episode results
Duel No.	Challenger	Category	Challenged	Winner's Time	Spaces Won (Total)	Choice
1	Sid	Tools	Zai	34 seconds left	1 space (2 total)	Continued
2	Zai	Cars	Greg	28 seconds left	2 spaces (3 total)	Floor
3	Tory	A Listers	Natalia	39 seconds left	1 space (2 total)	Floor
4	Kat	Songs About Places	Jasper	31 seconds left	1 space (2 total)	Continued
5	Jasper	Popular Books	Christian	34 seconds left	1 space (3 total)	Continued
6	Jasper	Slogans	Zane	23 seconds left	1 space (4 total)	Floor
7	Josh	Dogs (Inherited)	Jasper	6 seconds left	1 space (5 total)	Floor

Week 2 (January 9, 2024): Top 74 – 8 Duels

Second episode results
Duel No.	Challenger	Category	Challenged	Winner's Time	Spaces Won (Total)	Choice
8	Krystal	Fashion Brands	Hannah	30 seconds left	1 space (2 total)	Floor
9	Darin	Veggies (Inherited)	Greg	19 seconds left	1 space (4 total)	Floor
10	Tom	Toys	Charles	36 seconds left	1 space (2 total)	Continued
11	Tom	Bugs (Inherited)	Natalia	21 seconds left	2 spaces (4 total)	Continued
12	Tom	Cereals (Inherited)	Greg	23 seconds left	4 spaces (8 total)	Floor
13	Anne	TV Hosts	Jacquelyn	19 seconds left	1 space (2 total)	Floor
14	Kevin	Bands	Tom	24 seconds left	1 space (9 total)	Floor
15	Adinah	Sci-Fi (Inherited)	Tom	24 seconds left	1 space (10 total)	Floor

Week 3 (January 16, 2024): Top 66 – 8 Duels

Third episode results
Duel No.	Challenger	Category	Challenged	Winner's Time	Spaces Won (Total)	Choice
16	Brittany	Musicals (Inherited)	Jacquelyn	38 seconds left	1 space (3 total)	Floor
17	Nichole	Cartoons	Alahna	26 seconds left	1 space (2 total)	Continued
18	Alahna	Medical Devices	Moriah	11 seconds left	1 space (3 total)	Floor
19	Stephanie	Horror Movies (Inherited)	Tom	13 seconds left	10 spaces (11 total)	Floor
20	Jennifer	Oscar Winners	Zennie	20 seconds left	1 space (2 total)	Continued
21	Jennifer	College Teams	Sean	35 seconds left	2 spaces (3 total)	Continued
22	Sean	Moguls	James	13 seconds left	3 spaces (4 total)	Continued
23	James	Famous Sidekicks	Liz	12 seconds left	4 spaces (5 total)	Continued

Week 4 (January 23, 2024): Top 58 – 8 Duels

Fourth episode results
Duel No.	Challenger	Category	Challenged	Winner's Time	Spaces Won (Total)	Choice
24	Liz	Junk Drawer Items	Eugene	10 seconds left	1 space (6 total)	Continued
25	Liz	Technology	Steve	14 seconds left	6 spaces (7 total)	Continued
26	Steve	Idioms	Mondo	5 seconds left	1 space (8 total)	Floor
27	Dani	Brunch	Stephanie	8 seconds left	1 space (12 total)	Floor
28	Sarah	Tourist Hotspots	Victoria	26 seconds left	1 space (2 total)	Continued
29	Victoria	Spices & Condiments (Inherited)	Steve	6 seconds left	2 spaces (10 total)	Continued
30	Steve	Sports Equipment	Will	25 seconds left	1 space (11 total)	Continued
31	Steve	Movie Quotes	Lucas	18 seconds left	1 space (12 total)	Floor

Week 5 (January 30, 2024): Top 50 – 8 Duels

Fifth episode results
Duel No.	Challenger	Category	Challenged	Winner's Time	Spaces Won (Total)	Choice
32	Ford	Famous Animals	Michele	26 seconds left	1 space (2 total)	Continued
33	Ford	Fast Food (Inherited)	Hannah	9 seconds left	2 spaces (4 total)	Floor
34	Luis	Divas	Ross	18 seconds left	1 space (2 total)	Continued
35	Luis	Candy	Kaylee	21 seconds left	2 spaces (3 total)	Floor
36	Sunnie	Celebrities on The Simpsons (Inherited)	Steve	32 seconds left	12 spaces (13 total)	Floor
37	Alayna	Birds (Inherited)	Stephanie	12 seconds left	1 space (13 total)	Floor
38	Pasquale	Child Stars	Cher	21 seconds left	1 space (2 total)	Continued
39	Cher	Mobile Apps	Khalil	16 seconds left	1 space (3 total)	Floor

Week 6 (February 6, 2024): Top 42 – 8 Duels

Sixth episode results
Duel No.	Challenger	Category	Challenged	Winner's Time	Spaces Won (Total)	Choice
40	Mark	Political Candidates	Lindsey	9 seconds left	1 space (2 total)	Floor
41	Sarah	Kids' Books (Inherited)	Stephanie	33 seconds left	1 space (14 total)	Floor
42	Mark	Rock Stars (Inherited)	Jasper	24 seconds left	1 space (6 total)	Continued
43	Jasper	Nepo Babies	Anne	19 seconds left	6 spaces (7 total)	Floor
44	Joey	Bathroom Items (Inherited)	Cher	32 seconds left	3 spaces (4 total)	Continued
45	Joey	Space	Tommy	14 seconds left	1 space (5 total)	Continued
46	Joey	Desserts	Sunnie	6 seconds left	13 spaces (18 total)	Continued
47	Joey	Clothing & Accessories	Ford	3 seconds left	4 spaces (22 total)	Floor

Week 7 (February 13, 2024): Top 34 – 9 Duels

Seventh episode results
Duel No.	Challenger	Category	Challenged	Winner's Time	Spaces Won (Total)	Choice
48	David	Wild Animals	Joey	32 seconds left	1 space (23 total)	Floor
49	David	Drinks (Inherited)	Stephanie	27 seconds left	1 space (15 total)	Continued
50	Stephanie	BBQ (Inherited)	Anne	1 second left	15 spaces (22 total)	Continued
51	Anne	Reality TV	Adam	12 seconds left	1 space (23 total)	Continued
52	Anne	Comedians	Gene	29 seconds left	23 spaces (24 total)	Floor
53	Angie	Famous Hair (Inherited)	Joey	1 second left	23 spaces (24 total)	Floor
54	Gabriel	Transportation	Angie	12 seconds left	24 spaces (25 total)	Floor
55	Claire	Shoes	Michael	14 seconds left	1 space (2 total)	Floor
56	Chris	Fruits	Gabriel	21 seconds left	1 space (26 total)	Floor

Week 8 (February 20, 2024): Top 25 – 8 Duels

Eighth episode results
Duel No.	Challenger	Category	Challenged	Winner's Time	Spaces Won (Total)	Choice
57	John	Human Body (Inherited)	Gabriel	25 seconds left	1 space (27 total)	Floor
58	Joel	World Capitals (Inherited)	Gabriel	11 seconds left	1 space (28 total)	Continued
59	Gabriel	Instruments	Nicholas	19 seconds left	28 spaces (29 total)	Floor
60	Michael	Flags (Inherited)	Nicholas	29 seconds left	1 space (30 total)	Floor
61	Laphea	Historic Headlines (Inherited)	Nicholas	31 seconds left	1 space (31 total)	Continued
62	Nicholas	History Makers	Andrew	15 seconds left	1 space (32 total)	Floor
63	Austin	Kitchenware (Inherited)	Nicholas	20 seconds left	1 space (33 total)	Floor
64	Matthew	Sports Movies (Inherited)	Nicholas	31 seconds left	33 spaces (34 total)	Floor

Week 9 Part 1 (February 27, 2024): Top 17 – 8 Duels

Ninth episode results
Duel No.	Challenger	Category	Challenged	Winner's Time	Spaces Won (Total)	Choice
65	Jennifer	One Hit Wonders (Inherited)	Gene	3 seconds left	1 space (25 total)	Continued
66	Gene	Hip-Hop	Tiffany	21 seconds left	1 space (26 total)	Continued
67	Gene	80s TV	Heidi	25 seconds left	1 space (27 total)	Floor
68	Tim	Geography	Claire	9 seconds left	1 space (3 total)	Floor
69	Riley	Snacks (Inherited)	Kaylee	39 seconds left	3 spaces (4 total)	Floor
70	Tucker	Games (Inherited)	Gene	29 seconds left	1 space (28 total)	Continued
71	Gene	Movie Characters	Dyllan	22 seconds left	1 space (29 total)	Continued
72	Gene	TV Show Locations (Inherited)	Claire	25 seconds left	3 spaces (32 total)	Continued

Week 9 Part 2 (February 27, 2024): Top 9 – 8 Duels

Tenth episode results
Duel No.	Challenger	Category	Challenged	Winner's Time	Spaces Won (Total)	Choice
73	Gene	Athletes	Matthew	37 seconds left	32 spaces (66 total)	Continued
74	Matthew	U.S. States (Inherited)	Lindsey	9 seconds left	2 spaces (68 total)	Continued
75	Matthew	Olympic Events	Kwame	32 seconds left	1 space (69 total)	Continued
76	Matthew	Best Picture Winners	Arthur	22 seconds left	69 spaces (70 total)	Continued
77 (Note: Joanie was the last contestant remaining with a one-square territory. From this point on, all the remaining contestants became eligible for the randomizer at any time.)	Arthur	Hobbies	Joanie	8 seconds left	1 space (71 total)	Continued
78	Arthur	Country Music (Inherited)	Alahna	14 seconds left	3 spaces (74 total)	Continued
79	Arthur	Plants	Riley	6 seconds left	4 spaces (78 total)	Duel Choice: Fashion Icons
80	Arthur	Fashion Icons (Inherited)	Jacquelyn	39 seconds left	78 spaces (81 total)	N/A

=== Season 2 ===
Week 1 (September 25, 2024): Top 100 – 8 Duels

First episode results
Duel No.	Challenger	Category	Challenged	Winner's Time	Spaces Won (Total)	Choice
1	Wade	Farm Life	Marley	4 seconds left	1 space (2 total)	Floor
2	Joshua	School Supplies (Inherited)	Marley	6 seconds left	1 space (3 total)	Continued
3	Marley	Tailgating	Ryan	10 seconds left	3 spaces (4 total)	Floor
4	Lisa	Beauty	Sharday	3 seconds left	1 space (2 total)	Floor
5	Maggie	Halloween Costumes	Megan	15 seconds left	1 space (2 total)	Floor
6	Josue	On Safari	Vanessa	3 seconds left	1 space (2 total)	Floor
7	Michael	Restaurant Chains	Ali	17 seconds left	1 space (2 total)	Floor
8	Angie	Stocks	Andrew	21 seconds left	1 space (2 total)	Continued

Week 2 (October 2, 2024): Top 92 – 8 Duels

Second episode results
Duel No.	Challenger	Category	Challenged	Winner's Time	Spaces Won (Total)	Choice
9	Angie	Acronyms	Will	4 seconds left	1 space (3 total)	Continued
10	Angie	Baked Goods	Izzy	26 seconds left	1 space (4 total)	Floor
11	Cyrene	Pizza Toppings	Landis	27 seconds left	1 space (2 total)	Floor
12	Mena	Taylor Swift Songs	Monica	15 seconds left	1 space (2 total)	Floor
13	Keelan	Professions	Sage	14 seconds left	1 space (2 total)	Floor
14	Julie Ann	Sitcoms	Heather	3 seconds left	1 space (2 total)	Continued
15	Julie Ann	Cleaning Brands (Inherited)	Ryan	22 seconds left	4 spaces (6 total)	Floor
16	Neal	Holiday Movies	Eric	16 seconds left	1 space (2 total)	Continued

Week 3 (October 9, 2024): Top 84 – 9 Duels

Third episode results
Duel No.	Challenger	Category	Challenged	Winner's Time	Spaces Won (Total)	Choice
17	Neal	At the Mall	Chelsey	31 seconds left	2 spaces (3 total)	Floor
18	Emily	Cheese (Inherited)	Sharday	28 seconds left	1 space (3 total)	Floor
19	Kaitlin	Smoothies	James	26 seconds left	1 space (2 total)	Floor
20	Emily	Young Adult Novels	Maureen	40 seconds left	1 space (2 total)	Continued
21	Maureen	Superstars	Robert	33 seconds left	1 space (3 total)	Continued
22	Maureen	Playbills	Haley	14 seconds left	1 space (4 total)	Continued
23	Haley	Recess	Jessica	19 seconds left	1 space (5 total)	Floor
24	Chris	Disco	Julie Ann	14 seconds left	1 space (7 total)	Floor
25	Tudi	Game Night	Andrew	30 seconds left	1 space (2 total)	Continued

Week 4 (October 16, 2024): Top 75 – 8 Duels

Fourth episode results
Duel No.	Challenger	Category	Challenged	Winner's Time	Spaces Won (Total)	Choice
26	Andrew	World Currencies (Inherited)	Chelsey	14 seconds left	2 spaces (5 total)	Floor
27	Ben	Triple Threats	Kara	10 seconds left	1 space (2 total)	Continued
28	Kara	Daytime TV (Inherited)	Chelsey	25 seconds left	5 spaces (7 total)	Continued
29	Kara	Gen Z (Inherited)	Jessica	15 seconds left	5 spaces (12 total)	Floor
30	Morgan	Brand Mascots (Inherited)	Kara	12 seconds left	1 space (13 total)	Floor
31	Andrew	Action Films	Jake	14 seconds left	1 space (2 total)	Continued
32	Jake	Paintings (Inherited)	Vanessa	2 seconds left	2 spaces (4 total)	Continued
33	Jake	Vending Machines	Kilah	27 seconds left	1 space (5 total)	Continued

Week 5 (October 23, 2024): Top 67 – 8 Duels

Fifth episode results
Duel No.	Challenger	Category	Challenged	Winner's Time	Spaces Won (Total)	Choice
34	Jake (Note: Jake chose to save the time boost for a later duel.)	Constellations (Inherited)	Ali	39 seconds left	5 spaces (7 total)	Floor
35	Emily	Compound Words (Inherited)	Kara	24 seconds left	1 space (14 total)	Floor
36	Ryan Alan	Baseball Logos	Spiro	11 seconds left	1 space (2 total)	Floor
37	Grace	Circus	Kelly	17 seconds left	1 space (2 total)	Continued
38	Grace	Ocean Animals	Tommy	1 second left	1 space (3 total)	Continued
39	Grace	Coming of age Movies	Corey	3 seconds left	1 space (4 total)	Continued
40	Corey	Wrestlers (Inherited)	Julie Ann	37 seconds left	7 spaces (11 total)	Continued
41	Corey	Carnival Food	Ronald	24 seconds left	1 space (12 total)	Continued

Week 6 (November 6, 2024): Top 59 – 9 Duels

Sixth episode results
Duel No.	Challenger	Category	Challenged	Winner's Time	Spaces Won (Total)	Choice
42	Corey	Fitness	Melissa	8 seconds left	12 spaces (13 total)	Continued
43	Melissa	American Inventions	Anand	8 seconds left	13 spaces (14 total)	Continued
44	Anand	Star Wars	Mack	3 seconds left	14 spaces (15 total)	Continued
45	Mack	Weather	Carlos	12 seconds left	1 space (16 total)	Continued
46	Mack	Blockbuster Movies (Inherited)	Landis	29 seconds left	2 spaces (18 total)	Floor
47	Mia	Cooking (Inherited)	Spiro	39 seconds left	2 spaces (3 total)	Floor
48	Gregg	Beach	Nate	26 seconds left	1 space (2 total)	Floor
49	Trevor	Musical Instruments (Audio Duel, Inherited)	Kara	14 seconds left	14 spaces (15 total)	Floor
50	Lia	Pop Stars (Inherited)	Mack	50 seconds left	1 space (19 total)	Continued

Week 7 (November 13, 2024): Top 50 – 8 Duels

Seventh episode results
Duel No.	Challenger	Category	Challenged	Winner's Time	Spaces Won (Total)	Choice
51	Mack	The Military	Lauren	6 seconds left	1 space (20 total)	Continued
52	Mack	Gems	Paolo	8 seconds left	20 spaces (21 total)	Continued
53	Paolo	Kids' Shows (Inherited)	Sharday	26 seconds left	21 spaces (24 total)	Floor
54	Talia	Best Sellers	Jayna	7 seconds left	1 space (2 total)	Floor
55	Virginia	State Flags (Inherited)	Sharday	11 seconds left	24 spaces (25 total)	Continued
56	Virginia	Holistic Spirituality	Trevor	16 seconds left	15 spaces (40 total)	Floor
57	Cristian	State Capitals	Robby	36 seconds left	1 space (2 total)	Continued
58	Cristian	Flowers	Virginia	33 seconds left	2 spaces (42 total)	Floor

Week 8 (November 20, 2024): Top 42 – 8 Duels

Eighth episode results
Duel No.	Challenger	Category	Challenged	Winner's Time	Spaces Won (Total)	Choice
59	Jeremy	DIY (Inherited)	Virginia	12 seconds left	42 spaces (43 total)	Floor
60	Holly	Puppies	Lili	27 seconds left	1 space (2 total)	Floor
61	Jennifer	Skylines	Sabrina	22 seconds left	1 space (2 total)	Floor
62	Austin	World History	Mia	19 seconds left	3 spaces (4 total)	Continued
63	Austin	New York	Paul	29 seconds left	1 space (5 total)	Continued
64	Austin	Animal Sounds (Audio Duel)	Danny	21 seconds left	5 spaces (6 total)	Continued
65	Danny	Female Athletes	Zuri	13 seconds left	1 space (7 total)	Continued
66	Danny	Alternative Music	Jeremy	19 seconds left	43 spaces (50 total)	Floor

Week 9 (November 28, 2024): Top 34 – 9 Duels

Ninth episode results
Duel No.	Challenger	Category	Challenged	Winner's Time	Spaces Won (Total)	Choice
67	Michael	Autumn	Sydney	10 seconds left	1 space (2 total)	Floor
68	Alicia	Car Parts	Paul	32 seconds left	1 space (2 total)	Floor
69	Danny	Failed Political Candidates (Inherited)	Danny (Note: Danny chose to save the time boost for a later duel.)	36 seconds left	1 space (51 total)	Floor
70	Amy	Extreme Sports	Tim	38 seconds left	1 space (2 total)	Continued
71	Tim	Halloween Movies (Inherited)	Danny	13 seconds left	2 spaces (53 total)	Floor
72	Lisa	Global Monuments	Alex	25 seconds left	1 space (2 total)	Floor
73	Jessica	Female Leaders	Sarah	26 seconds left	1 space (2 total)	Continued
74	Jessica	Nursery Rhymes (Inherited)	Danny	3 seconds left	53 spaces (55 total)	Floor
75	Joanna	Beans	Jennifer	4 seconds left	1 space (3 total)	Continued

Week 10 (December 4, 2024): Top 25 – 8 Duels

Tenth episode results
Duel No.	Challenger	Category	Challenged	Winner's Time	Spaces Won (Total)	Choice
76	Jennifer	American History	David	27 seconds left	1 space (4 total)	Floor
77	Trenton	Hockey	Catherine	30 seconds left	1 space (2 total)	Floor
78	Kevin	Reality TV Stars	Cassandra	16 seconds left	1 space (2 total)	Floor
79	Brandi	Girl Groups	Jessica	34 seconds left	1 space (56 total)	Continued
80	Jessica	R&B (Inherited)	Alex	30 seconds left	2 spaces (58 total)	Continued
81	Jessica	Disney Characters	Rita	4 seconds left	58 spaces (59 total)	Continued
82	Rita	Ancient Egypt (Inherited)	Ali	2 seconds left	59 spaces (66 total)	Floor
83	Nery	Beer	Bryan	13 seconds left	1 space (2 total)	Floor

Week 11 (December 11, 2024): Top 17 – 8 Duels

Eleventh episode results
Duel No.	Challenger	Category	Challenged	Winner's Time	Spaces Won (Total)	Choice
84	Dan	Spinoff Bands (Inherited)	Ali	29 seconds left	66 spaces (67 total)	Continued
85 (Note: Mick was the last contestant remaining with a one-square territory. From this point on, all the remaining contestants became eligible for the randomizer at any time.)	Dan	British Invasion	Mick	21 seconds left	67 spaces (68 total)	Continued
86	Mick	Medieval Times (Inherited)	Paul	30 seconds left	68 spaces (70 total)	Continued
87	Paul	Las Vegas (Inherited)	Megan	27 seconds left	70 spaces (72 total)	Continued
88	Megan	Art Supplies	Kevin	16 seconds left	72 spaces (74 total)	Continued
89	Kevin	College Mascots (Inherited)	Lili	33 seconds left	2 spaces (76 total)	Continued
90	Kevin	Stand-up Comedians	Nery	2 seconds left	2 spaces (78 total)	Continued
91	Kevin	News Personalities (Inherited)	James	21 seconds left	2 spaces (80 total)	Floor

Week 12 (December 18, 2024): Top 9 – 9 Duels

Twelfth episode results
Duel No.	Challenger	Category	Challenged	Winner's Time	Spaces Won (Total)	Choice	Final Duel Score
92	Mena	Based On a True Story	Angie	38 seconds left	2 spaces (6 total)	Continued	N/A
93	Angie	Game Show Hosts (Inherited)	Kevin	8 seconds left	80 spaces (86 total)	Floor	N/A
94	Jayna	Accessories (Inherited)	Angie	1 second left	86 spaces (88 total)	Continued	N/A
95	Jayna	National Parks (Inherited)	Nate	24 seconds left	88 spaces (90 total)	Continued	N/A
96	Nate	Lab Equipment (Inherited)	Catherine	31 seconds left	90 spaces (92 total)	Floor	N/A
97	Michael	Shakespeare (Inherited)	Catherine	28 seconds left	2 spaces (94 total)	Floor	N/A
98	Jennifer	Sneakers (Inherited)	Catherine	22 seconds left	94 spaces (98 total)	Duel Choice: Periodic Table, then CEOs	N/A
99	Jennifer	Periodic table	Keelan	23 seconds left	N/A	N/A	0–1
100	Keelan	CEOs (Inherited)	Jennifer	3 seconds left	98 spaces (100 total)	N/A	0–2

=== Season 3 ===
Week 1 (February 9, 2025): Top 100 – 8 Duels

First episode results
Duel No.	Challenger	Category	Challenged	Winner's Time	Spaces Won (Total)	Choice
1	Lisa	Pantry Items	Jamella	11 seconds left	1 space (2 total)	Floor
2	Madeline	Pets	Dayna	25 seconds left	1 space (2 total)	Continued
3	Madeline	Ancient History	Carli	29 seconds left	1 space (3 total)	Floor
4	Hennessy	Mountains	Mike	29 seconds left	1 space (2 total)	Floor
5	Jordan	Home Decor	Logan	22 seconds left	1 space (2 total)	Continued
6	Logan	Gardening	Nikki	2 seconds left	1 space (3 total)	Continued
7	Logan	Children's Literature	Noell	6 seconds left	1 space (4 total)	Floor
8	Haji	Ice Cream Flavors	Dara	31 seconds left	1 space (2 total)	Continued

Week 2 (February 12, 2025): Top 92 – 8 Duels

Second episode results
Duel No.	Challenger	Category	Challenged	Winner's Time	Spaces Won (Total)	Choice
9	Dara	Antiques	Laura	5 seconds left	2 spaces (3 total)	Floor
10	Cody	Female Country Stars	Carolyne	39 seconds left	1 space (2 total)	Continued
11	Cody	SNL Alumni	Michael	32 seconds left	2 spaces (3 total)	Floor
12	Alex	Sushi	Darlene	25 seconds left	1 space (2 total)	Floor
13	LaShonda	Convenience Store Items	Brian	15 seconds left	1 space (2 total)	Continued
14	Brian	Landmark Architecture	Madeline	10 seconds left	3 spaces (5 total)	Continued
15	Brian	Classic Films (Inherited)	Logan	28 seconds left	4 spaces (9 total)	Floor
16	Jahmani	Breakfast	Brianna	27 seconds left	1 space (2 total)	Continued

Week 3 (February 19, 2025): Top 84 – 9 Duels

Third episode results
Duel No.	Challenger	Category	Challenged	Winner's Time	Spaces Won (Total)	Choice
17	Brianna	Black & White	Nick	4 seconds left	2 spaces (3 total)	Floor
18	Garrett	Islands (Association Duel, Inherited)	Mike	17 seconds left	1 space (3 total)	Floor
19	Magic	Summer Olympic Events	Kent	16 seconds left	1 space (2 total)	Floor
20	Marc	Doomsday Prep (Inherited)	Kent	11 seconds left	2 spaces (3 total)	Continued
21	Marc	Sandwich Ingredients (Inherited)	Michael	17 seconds left	3 spaces (6 total)	Floor
22	Steven	Airport codes (Inherited)	Laura	20 seconds left	3 spaces (4 total)	Floor
23	Mark	Electronics	Brian	31 seconds left	1 space (2 total)	Floor
24	Kenny	Rappers	Eric	29 seconds left	1 space (2 total)	Floor
25	Terry	Sports MVPs	Seth	20 seconds left	1 space (2 total)	Floor

Week 4 (February 26, 2025): Top 75 – 8 Duels

Fourth episode results
Duel No.	Challenger	Category	Challenged	Winner's Time	Spaces Won (Total)	Choice
26	Matthew (Note: Matthew volunteered to be randomized as part of the volunteer randomizer twist.)	Sports Films	Clint	9 seconds left	1 space (2 total)	Floor
27	Jeremy	College Basketball (Inherited)	Nick	39 seconds left	1 space (4 total)	Floor
28	Benedetta	Yoga	Alex	5 seconds left	1 space (2 total)	Continued
29	Alex	20th Century Inventions (Inherited)	Brian	14 seconds left	2 spaces (11 total)	Floor
30	Sifat	Star Trek (Inherited)	Michael	14 seconds left	6 spaces (7 total)	Floor
31	Shannon	Agriculture	Liz	22 seconds left	1 space (2 total)	Continued
32	Shannon	Math – Multiplication	Toni	7 seconds left	2 spaces (3 total)	Continued
33	Toni	Fantasy Films	Lillie	21 seconds left	1 space (4 total)	Continued

Week 5 (March 5, 2025): Top 67 – 8 Duels

Fifth episode results
Duel No.	Challenger	Category	Challenged	Winner's Time	Spaces Won (Total)	Choice
34	Toni	TV Moms (Inherited)	Nick	24 seconds left	4 spaces (8 total)	Floor
35	Damon	Mythical Creatures	Andrew	19 seconds left	1 space (2 total)	Floor
36	Hank	Iconic Duos	Elena	8 seconds left	1 space (2 total)	Floor
37	Barbie	Met Gala	Sifat	25 seconds left	1 space (8 total)	Floor
38	Zack	Derby	Magan	24 seconds left	1 space (2 total)	Continued
39	Magan	Collectibles	Steve	13 seconds left	1 space (3 total)	Continued
40	Magan	Fictional Fathers	Julian	2 seconds left	1 space (4 total)	Floor
41	Wyatt	Directors (Inherited)	Brian	38 seconds left	1 space (12 total)	Floor

Week 6 (March 12, 2025): Top 59 – 9 Duels

Sixth episode results
Duel No.	Challenger	Category	Challenged	Winner's Time	Spaces Won (Total)	Choice
42	Michele	Stars With Stars – Hollywood Walk of Fame	Priscilla	28 seconds left	1 space (2 total)	Floor
43	Bradley	Toiletries	Kimberley	22 seconds left	1 space (2 total)	Continued
44	Kimberley	Natural history	Alex	31 seconds left	2 spaces (4 total)	Continued
45	Alex	Kitchen appliances	Jameela	7 seconds left	1 space (5 total)	Continued
46	Alex	Rock & Roll Hall of Fame (Inherited)	Elena	32 seconds left	2 spaces (7 total)	Continued
47	Alex	Real Housewives	Ira	16 seconds left	1 space (8 total)	Floor
48	Robin	Space Travel	Cherif	24 seconds left	1 space (2 total)	Floor
49	James	Oceanography	Shane	30 seconds left	1 space (2 total)	Floor
50	Clarione	TV Chefs	Steven	18 seconds left	1 space (5 total)	Floor

Week 7 (March 19, 2025): Top 50 – 8 Duels

Seventh episode results
Duel No.	Challenger	Category	Challenged	Winner's Time	Spaces Won (Total)	Choice
51	Baron	Backyard Games (Inherited)	Priscilla	11 seconds left	2 spaces (3 total)	Floor
52	Cassie	Congress	Jay	32 seconds left	1 space (2 total)	Continued
53	Jay	Rodeo (Inherited)	Brian	23 seconds left	2 spaces (14 total)	Floor
54	Phil	Pasta	Amanda	8 seconds left	1 space (2 total)	Floor
55	Spark	Latin Musicians (Inherited)	Sifat	3 seconds left	1 space (9 total)	Continued
56	Sifat	Crayon Colors	Stephanie	25 seconds left	9 spaces (10 total)	Continued
57	Stephanie	Tony Winners	Jeorgi	12 seconds left	1 space (11 total)	Continued
58	Stephanie	Hunting & Camping (Inherited)	Mike	5 seconds left	11 spaces (14 total)	Continued

Week 8 (March 26, 2025): Top 42 – 8 Duels

Eighth episode results
Duel No.	Challenger	Category	Challenged	Winner's Time	Spaces Won (Total)	Choice
59	Mike	Competition Shows	Anna	11 seconds left	1 space (15 total)	Continued
60	Mike	State Quarters	Robin	7 seconds left	2 spaces (17 total)	Floor
61	Katie	The Amazon	Mariana	22 seconds left	1 space (2 total)	Continued
62	Mariana	Teen Dramas	Emily	15 seconds left	2 spaces (3 total)	Floor
63	Katina	Rom-Coms (Inherited)	Mike	50 seconds left	1 space (18 total)	Floor
64	Ashley	Parades (Inherited)	Shane	7 seconds left	1 space (3 total)	Continued
65	Shane	Physics (Inherited)	Mike	16 seconds left	18 spaces (21 total)	Floor
66	Jake	Beyonce Songs (Inherited)	Shane	32 seconds left	1 space (22 total)	Continued

Week 9 (April 2, 2025): Top 34 – 9 Duels

Ninth episode results
Duel No.	Challenger	Category	Challenged	Winner's Time	Spaces Won (Total)	Choice
67	Shane	Road Trip	Devin	14 seconds left	22 spaces (23 total)	Continued
68	Devin	Travel Accessories (Inherited)	Eric	5 seconds left	23 spaces (25 total)	Continued
69	Eric	Changemakers	Mary-Ellen	21 seconds left	1 space (26 total)	Continued
70	Eric	Medicine	Slim	19 seconds left	1 space (27 total)	Floor
71	Kevin	Puppets (Inherited)	Andrew	3 seconds left	1 space (3 total)	Floor
72	Marcus	Nerdy Characters (Inherited)	Eric	17 seconds left	1 space (28 total)	Floor
73	Anthony	Aviation (Inheirited)	Brian	25 seconds left	1 space (15 total)	Floor
74	Kaylie	Critters (Inherited)	Eric	34 seconds left	1 space (29 total)	Floor
75	Kathy	Billionaires (Inherited)	Eric	31 seconds left	29 spaces (30 total)	Floor

Week 10 (April 9, 2025): Top 25 – 8 Duels

Tenth episode results
Duel No.	Challenger	Category	Challenged	Winner's Time	Spaces Won (Total)	Choice
76	Sharon	Baby Products	Makenna	10 seconds left	1 space (2 total)	Continued
77	Makenna	Haunted Locations (Inherited)	Brian	19 seconds left	2 spaces (17 total)	Floor
78	Mari	Punctuation & Symbols	Ted	8 seconds left	1 space (2 total)	Floor
79	Laura	Song of the Year (Inherited)	Amanda	25 seconds left	1 space (3 total)	Floor
80	Alex	Anatomy (Inherited)	Toni	7 seconds left	1 space (9 total)	Continued
81	Toni	Water Brands (Inherited)	Emily	11 seconds left	3 spaces (12 total)	Floor
82	Tyler	Construction (Inherited)	Brian	30 seconds left	1 space (18 total)	Floor
83	Ashlee	Murder Mysteries	Kathy	39 seconds left	1 space (31 total)	Floor

Week 11 (April 16, 2025): Top 17 – 8 Duels

Eleventh episode results
Duel No.	Challenger	Category	Challenged	Winner's Time	Spaces Won (Total)	Choice
84	Zaph	Fairy Tales & Fables (Inherited)	Brian	28 seconds left	18 spaces (19 total)	Continued
85	Zaph	Languages (Audio Duel, Inherited)	Amanda	38 seconds left	3 spaces (22 total)	Continued
86	Zaph	Marvel	Baron	3 seconds left	22 spaces (25 total)	Continued
87	Baron	Classic Cars (Inherited)	Clint	13 seconds left	25 spaces (27 total)	Floor
88	David	Eras (Association Duel, Inherited)	Clint	38 seconds left	27 spaces (28 total)	Floor
89 (Note: Laurel was the last contestant remaining with a one-square territory. Therefore, she was selected by default to play. From this point on, all the remaining contestants became eligible for the randomizer at any time.)	Laurel	Authors (Inherited)	Kathy	28 seconds left	31 spaces (32 total)	Floor
90	Lisa	European Geography	David	41 seconds left	2 spaces (30 total)	Continued
91	David	Bodies of Water	Terry	20 seconds left	2 spaces (32 total)	Floor

Week 12 (April 23, 2025): Top 9 – 10 Duels

Twelfth episode results
Duel No.	Challenger	Category	Challenged	Winner's Time	Spaces Won (Total)	Choice	Final Duel Score
92	Laurel	Hotels & Motels (Inherited)	Ted	15 seconds left	32 spaces (34 total)	Continued	N/A
93	Ted	Trees (Inherited)	Magan (Note: Magan chose to save the time boost for a later duel.)	33 seconds left	4 spaces (38 total)	Continued	N/A
94	Ted	Fortune 500	Mark	14 seconds left	2 spaces (40 total)	Floor	N/A
95	Toni	The Crown (Inherited)	Ted	9 seconds left	40 spaces (52 total)	Continued	N/A
96	Toni	Weddings (Inherited)	David	25 seconds left	52 spaces (84 total)	Continued	N/A
97	David	Poetry (Inherited)	Alex	5 seconds left	8 spaces (92 total)	Continued	N/A
98	David	Endangered Animals (Inherited)	Andrew	5 seconds left	92 spaces (95 total)	Duel Choice: Boy Bands, then Cosplay	N/A
99	Andrew	Boy Bands (Inherited)	Steven	35 seconds left	N/A	N/A	0–1
100	Steven	Cosplay (Inherited)	Andrew	29 seconds left	N/A	N/A	1–1
101	Andrew (Note: Andrew was randomly selected to go first.)	International Foods (Note: There was no best-of-3 final duel in season one, so this category went unplayed, and it was used as the tiebreaker.) (Tiebreaker)	Steven	24 seconds left	95 spaces (100 total)	N/A	1–2

=== Season 4 ===
Week 1 (September 24, 2025): Top 100 – 8 Duels

First episode results
Duel No.	Challenger	Category	Challenged	Winner's Time	Spaces Won (Total)	Choice
1	Charlie (TX)	Fried Foods	Rick (WI)	28 seconds left	1 space (2 total)	Floor
2	Elizabeth (VT)	Pet Supplies	Marcia (GA)	3 seconds left	1 space (2 total)	Floor
3	Laura (MN)	Formal Wear	Frank (UT)	18 seconds left	1 space (2 total)	Continued
4	Frank (UT)	Hall of Famers – Sports Hall of Fame	Justin (UT)	16 seconds left	2 spaces (3 total)	Floor
5	Jackie (GA)	Villains	Demetrice (AL)	39 seconds left	1 space (2 total)	Floor
6	Ricky (AK)	Famous Couples	Cibelle (NY)	16 seconds left	1 space (2 total)	Floor
7	Luke (NM)	Sandra Bullock Films (Inherited)	Justin (UT)	34 seconds left	3 spaces (4 total)	Floor
8	Jonny (OR)	Stamps	Kwame (AZ)	33 seconds left	1 space (2 total)	Continued

Week 2 (October 1, 2025): Top 92 – 8 Duels

At the beginning of this episode, one square was designated as the Golden Square of the season, which will reward $10,000 to the winner once the category from that square is challenged. The Golden Square twist is over once the golden square is found.

Second episode results
Duel No.	Challenger	Category	Challenged	Winner's Time	Spaces Won (Total)	Choice
9	Jonny (OR)	Sitcom Families (Inherited)	Marcia (GA)	6 seconds left	2 spaces (4 total)	Continued
10	Marcia (GA)	Food Holidays	Evan (NE)	24 seconds left	1 space (5 total)	Floor
11	Tim (NY)	Platinum Vinyl Albums (Inherited)	Marcia (GA)	24 seconds left	5 spaces (6 total)	Floor
12	David (ID)	Dollar Store	Brittany (CT)	14 seconds left	1 space (2 total)	Continued
13	David (ID)	Theme Parties	Katelyn (AL)	16 seconds left	2 spaces (3 total)	Floor
14	Delante (MD)	Junkyard	Tim (NY)	12 seconds left	1 space (7 total)	Floor
15	Molly (KY)	Variety Acts	Heather (MO)	9 seconds left	1 space (2 total)	Floor
16	Ty (ID)	Real estate (Inherited)	Tim (NY)	28 seconds left	7 spaces (8 total)	Floor

Week 3 (October 8, 2025): Top 84 – 9 Duels

Third episode results
Duel No.	Challenger	Category	Challenged	Winner's Time	Spaces Won (Total)	Choice
17	Dom (RI)	Chip Brands	Christina (CO)	39 seconds left	1 space (2 total)	Floor
18	Dash (CT)	Commodities	Brad (NM)	11 seconds left	1 space (2 total)	Floor
19	Bo (TN)	Mammals	Kiera (WI)	23 seconds left	1 space (2 total)	Continued
20	Kiera (WI)	Viral Moments	Sam (OR)	8 seconds left	2 spaces (3 total)	Continued
21	Sam (OR)	Simpsons Characters	Erin (IA)	23 seconds left	3 spaces (4 total)	Continued
22	Erin (IA)	Banned Books	Kristy (WV)	6 seconds left	1 space (5 total)	Continued
23	Erin (IA)	Theme Parks	Ashley (CA)	3 seconds left	5 spaces (6 total)	Continued
24	Ashley (CA)	Brat Pack	Ty (ID)	28 seconds left	8 spaces (14 total)	Continued
25	Ashley (CA)	Emmy-Winning TV Shows	Kyle (RI)	22 seconds left	1 space (15 total)	Steal Choice: Harry Potter (From Courtney); Floor

Week 4 (October 15, 2025): Top 75 – 9 Duels

Fourth episode results
Duel No.	Challenger	Category	Challenged	Winner's Time	Spaces Won (Total)	Choice
26	Jason (MT)	Impressions (Note: Tom's category of Impressions being challenged meant that the golden square had been revealed and the duel awarded $10,000 to the winner.) (Audio Duel)	Tom (MI)	9 seconds left	1 space (2 total)	Floor
27	Megan (OH)	Telling Time	Carlheb (MA)	13 seconds left	1 space (2 total)	Continued
28	Megan (OH)	Public Transit	Aaron (NC)	11 seconds left	2 spaces (3 total)	Continued
29	Aaron (NC)	Red carpet (Video Duel)	Bo (OK)	24 seconds left	1 space (4 total)	Continued
30	Aaron (NC)	Buffet	Kristi (SD)	10 seconds left	1 space (5 total)	Continued
31	Aaron (NC)	TED Talk	Victoria (FL)	46 seconds left	1 space (6 total)	Continued
32	Aaron (NC)	High School	Harley (NJ)	10 seconds left	1 space (7 total)	Continued
33	Aaron (NC)	Fictional Creatures (Inherited)	Katelyn (AL)	31 seconds left	3 spaces (10 total)	Steal Choice: Harry Potter (From Ashley); Continued
34	Aaron (NC)	Coffee (Inherited)	Ashley (CA)	28 seconds left	15 spaces (25 total)	Floor

Week 5 (October 22, 2025): Top 66 – 8 Duels

Fifth episode results
Duel No.	Challenger	Category	Challenged	Winner's Time	Spaces Won (Total)	Choice
35	Arlene (MN)	Food Pairings	Idecia (MS)	21 seconds left	1 space (2 total)	Floor
36	Ashton (LA)	Lisa Frank	Dorian (AZ)	18 seconds left	1 space (2 total)	Floor
37	Matt (TX)	Movie Musicals	Shelby (VA)	24 seconds left	1 space (2 total)	Floor
38	Tania (DE)	Playing Cards	Josh (AR)	16 seconds left	1 space (2 total)	Floor
39	Elizabeth (DE)	Houseplants	Arlene (MN)	10 seconds left	2 spaces (3 total)	Continued
40	Elizabeth (DE)	Famous Criminals	Leigh (VT)	15 seconds left	1 space (4 total)	Continued
41	Elizabeth (DE)	Great Outdoors (Inherited)	Cibelle (NY)	12 seconds left	2 spaces (6 total)	Steal Choice: Harry Potter (From Aaron); Continued
42	Elizabeth (DE)	Regency era (Inherited)	Aaron (NC)	35 seconds left	25 spaces (31 total)	Floor

Week 6 (November 5, 2025): Top 58 – 8 Duels

Sixth episode results
Duel No.	Challenger	Category	Challenged	Winner's Time	Spaces Won (Total)	Choice
43	Mark (KY)	Tablescapes	Lilliana (NV)	5 seconds left	1 space (2 total)	Continued
44	Mark (KY)	Harry Potter (Stolen)	Elizabeth (DE)	26 seconds left	2 spaces (33 total)	Continued
45	Elizabeth (DE)	Holiday Foods	Kelsey (SD)	3 seconds left	33 spaces (34 total)	Continued
46	Kelsey (SD)	Monopoly (Inherited)	Christina (CO)	14 seconds left	2 spaces (36 total)	Continued
47	Kelsey (SD)	On-Screen Judges	Luke (NM)	21 seconds left	36 spaces (40 total)	Continued
48	Luke (NM)	Scents	Charlie (MI)	9 seconds left	40 spaces (41 total)	Floor
49	Jonathan (NJ)	Junk Food (Inherited)	Charlie (MI)	19 seconds left	41 spaces (42 total)	Continued
50	Jonathan (NJ)	Combat Films	Bob (NH)	37 seconds left	1 space (43 total)	Continued

Week 7 (November 12, 2025): Top 50 – 9 Duels

Seventh episode results
Duel No.	Challenger	Category	Challenged	Winner's Time	Spaces Won (Total)	Choice
51	Jonathan (NJ)	Ghost Stories	Ashton (LA)	18 seconds left	2 spaces (45 total)	Floor
52	Andre (VA)	Box Office Flops	Eric (MD)	34 seconds left	1 space (2 total)	Continued
53	Eric (MD)	U.S. Stadiums	Jeff (IL)	11 seconds left	1 space (3 total)	Continued
54	Eric (MD)	Fruit Trees	Rebecca (NE)	31 seconds left	3 spaces (4 total)	Continued
55	Rebecca (NE)	Superfoods (Inherited)	Demetrice (AL)	18 seconds left	2 spaces (6 total)	Continued
56	Rebecca (NE)	Summer Camp	Jason (MT)	19 seconds left	6 spaces (8 total)	Floor
57	Aaron (IN)	Deli	Debbie (WV)	31 seconds left	1 space (2 total)	Continued
58	Debbie (WV)	Marching Band	Josh (SC)	20 seconds left	2 spaces (3 total)	Continued
59	Josh (SC)	Witchcraft	Ashley (IL)	31 seconds left	3 spaces (4 total)	Continued

Week 8 (November 19, 2025): Top 41 – 9 Duels

Eighth episode results
Duel No.	Challenger	Category	Challenged	Winner's Time	Spaces Won (Total)	Choice
60	Ashley (IL)	Country Music Awards	Mark (OK)	19 seconds left	1 space (5 total)	Continued
61	Ashley (IL)	Canadian Icons	Sadia (CA)	32 seconds left	1 space (6 total)	Floor
62	Sergio (CO)	Podcasters	Jonathan (NJ) (Note: Jonathan chose to save the time boost for a later duel.)	43 seconds left	1 space (46 total)	Continued
63	Jonathan (NJ)	Phobias	LaTasha (SC) (Note: This duel had the category be completed, and the contestant with more time won the duel. Latasha had 2 seconds remaining.)	14 seconds left	1 space (47 total)	Continued
64	Jonathan (NJ)	Disney Animation	Andrea (IA)	11 seconds left	1 space (48 total)	Steal Choice: Book Adaptations (From Armand); Floor
65	Julie (ND)	Famous Teachers	Jonny (IN)	5 seconds left	1 space (2 total)	Floor
66	Emily (NC)	Energy Drinks	Jasmine (WA)	18 seconds left	1 space (2 total)	Continued
67	Jasmine (WA)	Terms of Endearment	Frank (HI)	25 seconds left	2 spaces (3 total)	Floor
68	Haley (LA)	Junk in the Trunk	Ben (PA)	9 seconds left	1 space (2 total)	Continued

Week 9 (December 3, 2025): Top 32 – 8 Duels

Ninth episode results
Duel No.	Challenger	Category	Challenged	Winner's Time	Spaces Won (Total)	Choice
69	Ben (PA)	Crime-Fighting Duos (Inherited)	Frank (HI)	38 seconds left	3 spaces (5 total)	Continued
70	Ben (PA)	Gymnastics	Marques (HI)	26 seconds left	5 spaces (6 total)	Floor
71	Zach (ME)	Book Adaptations (Stolen)	Jonathan (NJ)	28 seconds left	1 space (49 total)	Continued
72	Jonathan (NJ)	Pez Dispeners	Lukas (NV)	14 seconds left	49 spaces (50 total)	Floor
73	Anshpreet (TN)	Presidents (Association Duel)	Rick (MA)	10 seconds left	1 space (2 total)	Continued
74	Rick (MA)	New England (Inherited)	Lukas (NV)	22 seconds left	50 spaces (52 total)	Continued
75	Rick (MA)	Fishing (Inherited)	Marques (HI)	17 seconds left	52 spaces (58 total)	Floor
76	Laz (FL)	Luxury Car Brands (Inherited)	Marques (HI)	19 seconds left	58 spaces (59 total)	Floor

Week 10 (December 10, 2025): Top 24 – 8 Duels

Tenth episode results
Duel No.	Challenger	Category	Challenged	Winner's Time	Spaces Won (Total)	Choice
77	Jacob (OH)	Leather	Gary (WA)	14 seconds left	1 space (2 total)	Floor
78	Nicki (NH)	Arcade	Laz (FL)	20 seconds left	59 spaces (60 total)	Continued
79	Nicki (NH)	Christmas	Julie (ND)	23 seconds left	60 spaces (62 total)	Continued
80	Julie (ND)	State Nicknames (Inherited)	Jason (MT)	9 seconds left	8 spaces (70 total)	Continued
81	Julie (ND)	Mattel Toys (Inherited/Swapped)	Armand (KS)	16 seconds left	70 spaces (71 total)	Continued
82	Armand (KS)	Hip-hop Stars (Inherited)	Brad (NM)	9 seconds left	2 spaces (73 total)	Continued
83	Armand (KS)	Exercise Moves (Video Duel)	Matt (TX)	15 seconds left	73 spaces (75 total)	Floor
84	Valerie (PA)	Home Organization (Inherited)	Matt (TX)	36 seconds left	75 spaces (76 total)	Floor

Week 11 Part 1 (December 17, 2025): Top 16 – 8 Duels

Note: No $20,000 prize was awarded this episode, and the finale was instead two combined parts. When both parts began and ended is noted below.

Eleventh episode results
Duel No.	Challenger	Category	Challenged	Winner's Time	Spaces Won (Total)	Choice
85	Nicole (MO)	Dentist Office	Bailey (WY)	7 seconds left	1 space (2 total)	Floor
86	Courtney (MS)	State Flowers	Clara (MT)	26 seconds left	1 space (2 total)	Floor
87	Jeremy (ND)	White House	Valerie (PA)	34 seconds left	1 space (77 total)	Continued
88	Valerie (PA)	Swamplands	Jezrael (KS)	10 seconds left	77 spaces (78 total)	Continued
89	Jezrael (KS)	Car Racing (Inherited)	Clara (MT)	18 seconds left	2 spaces (80 total)	Continued
90	Jezrael (KS)	Wild West (Inherited)	Rick (WI)	11 seconds left	80 spaces (82 total)	Continued
91	Rick (WI)	Beatles Songs	Jacob (OH)	26 seconds left	82 spaces (84 total)	Floor
92	Kurt (AR)	Roman Numerals (Inherited)	Jacob (OH)	3 seconds left	1 space (85 total)	Floor

Week 11 Part 2 (December 17, 2025): Top 8 – 8 Duels

Twelfth episode results
Duel No.	Challenger	Category	Challenged	Winner's Time	Spaces Won (Total)	Choice	Final Duel Score
93	Sydney (WY)	Arctic Circle	Austin (AK)	25 seconds left	1 space (2 total)	Floor	N/A
94 (Note: Tim was the last contestant remaining with a one-square territory. Therefore, he was selected by default to play. From this point on, all the remaining contestants became eligible for the randomizer at any time.)	Tim (ME)	Geometry (Inherited)	Jacob (OH)	26 seconds left	1 space (86 total)	Continued	N/A
95	Jacob (OH)	American Revolution (Inherited)	Austin (AK)	25 seconds left	2 spaces (88 total)	Continued	N/A
96	Jacob (OH)	Paleontology	Molly (KY)	19 seconds left	88 spaces (90 total)	Floor	N/A
97	Molly (KY)	Biology	Nicole (MO)	13 seconds left	90 spaces (92 total)	Continued	N/A
98	Nicole (MO)	Bones (Inherited)	Josh (AR)	20 seconds left	92 spaces (94 total)	Duel Choice: Ancient Greece, then Sportscasters	N/A
99	Josh (AR)	Ancient Greece (Inherited)	Ashley (IL)	7 seconds left	N/A	N/A	0–1
100	Ashley (IL)	Sportscasters (Inherited)	Josh (AR)	43 seconds left	94 spaces (100 total)	N/A	2–0

=== Season 5 ===
Week 1 Part 1 (April 8, 2026): Top 100 – 8 Duels

First episode results
Duel No.	Challenger	Category	Challenged	Winner's Time	Spaces Won (Total)	Choice
1	Jonathan	Sitcom Characters	Shanra	29 seconds left	1 space (2 total)	Continued
2	Jonathan	Pool Party	Taj	32 seconds left	2 spaces (3 total)	Floor
3	Sean	Female Pioneers	Ashlin	15 seconds left	1 space (2 total)	Continued
4	Ashlin	Office Supplies	Cierra	14 seconds left	2 spaces (3 total)	Continued
5	Cierra	Seafood	Jerrol	6 seconds left	1 space (4 total)	Floor
6	Vanessa	Carbonated Beverages	David	23 seconds left	1 space (2 total)	Floor
7	Alan	Grilling	Ahmad	21 seconds left	1 space (2 total)	Floor
8	Deon	Engineering Marvels (Inherited)	Cierra	11 seconds left	4 spaces (5 total)	Floor

Week 1 Part 2 (April 8, 2026): Top 92 – 8 Duels

Second episode results
Duel No.	Challenger	Category	Challenged	Winner's Time	Spaces Won (Total)	Choice
9	Bryan	Train Travel	Ella	8 seconds left	1 space (2 total)	Floor
10	Mark	Bowling	Greg	12 seconds left	1 space (2 total)	Continued
11	Mark	TIME Magazine Covers	Brooke	8 seconds left	1 space (3 total)	Continued
12	Mark	Household Chores	Michelle	6 seconds left	1 space (4 total)	Floor
13	Justin	Lord of the Rings	Kristin	6 seconds left	1 space (2 total)	Floor
14	Mike	Classic Toys	Terilisha	1 second left	1 space (2 total)	Floor
15	Kat	Sexiest Man Alive (Inherited)	David	1 second left	1 space (2 total)	Floor
16	Brad	Box Office Hits	Ryan	18 seconds left	1 space (2 total)	Continued

Week 2 (April 15, 2026): Top 84 – 9 Duels

Third episode results
Duel No.	Challenger	Category	Challenged	Winner's Time	Spaces Won (Total)	Choice
17	Ryan	Iconic Sayings (Inherited)	Kristin	3 seconds left	2 spaces (4 total)	Continued
18	Kristin	Kids Party	Eric	12 seconds left	4 spaces (5 total)	Continued
19	Eric	Gaming	Jenny	14 seconds left	1 space (6 total)	Continued
20	Eric	Kitchen Tools	Ja'Meisha	12 seconds left	1 space (7 total)	Floor
21	Kim	Bobbleheads	Shawn	25 seconds left	1 space (2 total)	Floor
22	Anastasia	Baked Dishes	Rebecca	38 seconds left	1 space (2 total)	Floor
23	Lawrenzo	One-Name Stars	Gigi	25 seconds left	1 space (2 total)	Continued
24	Gigi	Famous Dogs	Wook	6 seconds left	2 spaces (3 total)	Continued
25	Wook	New Year's Eve	Kayla	9 seconds left	3 spaces (4 total)	Continued

Week 3 (April 22, 2026): Top 75 – 8 Duels

Fourth episode results
Duel No.	Challenger	Category	Challenged	Winner's Time	Spaces Won (Total)	Choice
26	Kayla	Tattoos	Josh	2 seconds left	4 spaces (5 total)	Continued
27	Josh	Sundae Toppings (Inherited)	Taj	9 seconds left	5 spaces (8 total)	Floor
28	Nikki	Balls (Close-Up Duel, Inherited)	Eric (Note: Eric chose to save the time boost for a later duel in duels 28 and 29.)	8 seconds left	1 space (8 total)	Continued
29	Eric	World Soccer	Maria	7 seconds left	1 space (9 total)	Floor
30	Victor	Home Remedies	Taneya	14 seconds left	1 space (2 total)	Floor
31	Melanie	Dance Movies (Inherited)	David	28 seconds left	3 spaces (4 total)	Floor
32	Liz	Scary Movies	Ryan	9 seconds left	1 space (2 total)	Floor
33	Abdul	Comedy Headliners	Kristen	36 seconds left	1 space (2 total)	Continued

Week 4 (April 29, 2026): Top 67 – 8 Duels

Fifth episode results
Duel No.	Challenger	Category	Challenged	Winner's Time	Spaces Won (Total)	Choice
34	Kristen	Doctor's Office	Mallory	13 seconds left	2 spaces (3 total)	Floor
35	Kay	Emoji (Inherited)	Mallory	11 seconds left	3 spaces (4 total)	Continued
36	Kay	Vegetable Garden (Close-Up Duel)	Lissette	7 seconds left	4 spaces (5 total)	Floor
37	Erin	Iconic Eyes (Close-Up Duel)	Arianny	31 seconds left	1 space (2 total)	Continued
38	Erin	LEGO (Inherited)	Rebecca	6 seconds left	2 spaces (4 total)	Floor
39	Meg	Coming-Of-Age-TV	Nwamaka	12 seconds left	1 space (2 total)	Continued
40	Meg	Oregon Trail (Inherited)	Lissette	32 seconds left	5 spaces (7 total)	Continued
41	Meg	Bravo Stars	Paige	30 seconds left	7 spaces (8 total)	Continued

Week 5 (May 6, 2026): Top 59 – 9 Duels

Sixth episode results
Duel No.	Challenger	Category	Challenged	Winner's Time	Spaces Won (Total)	Choice
42	Paige	Romance Movies	Kiley	1 second left	1 space (9 total)	Continued
43	Paige	Machines (Audio Duel)	Reggie	13 seconds left	1 space (10 total)	Floor
44	Kristen	Air Travel	Will	10 seconds left	1 space (2 total)	Continued
45	Kristen	Track & Field	Emmanuel	10 seconds left	1 space (3 total)	Continued
46	Kristen	Book Club	Melanie	2 seconds left	4 spaces (7 total)	Steal Choice: Barbie (From Deon); Continued
47	Kristen	Halftime Shows (Inherited)	Deon	37 seconds left	5 spaces (12 total)	Floor
48	Austin	Spa Day	Ren	43 seconds left	1 space (2 total)	Floor
49	Rachel	Barbie (Stolen)	Kristen	11 seconds left	1 space (13 total)	Floor
50	Madison	Roman Empire (Inherited)	Taj	15 seconds left	1 space (9 total)	Continued

Week 6 (May 13, 2026): Top 50 – 8 Duels

Seventh episode results
Duel No.	Challenger (Note: Mike and Jess volunteered to be randomized as part of the volunteer randomizer twist.)	Category	Challenged	Winner's Time	Spaces Won (Total)	Choice
51	Taj	Ad Slogans	Kelita	11 seconds left	9 spaces (10 total)	Continued
52	Kelita	Summer	Michael	15 seconds left	1 space (11 total)	Continued
53	Kelita	Family Bands (Inherited)	Ahmad	4 seconds left	2 spaces (13 total)	Floor
54	Mike	Black & White Movies (Inherited)	Kelita	19 seconds left	2 spaces (15 total)	Continued
55	Kelita	Music Class	Dean	26 seconds left	15 spaces (16 total)	Floor
56	Jess	ABBA (Inherited)	Kristen	19 seconds left	13 spaces (14 total)	Continued
57	Jess	Nocturnal Animals	Leslie	27 seconds left	1 space (15 total)	Continued
58	Jess	Crochet Items	Morgan	6 seconds left	15 spaces (16 total)	Continued

Week 7 (May 20, 2026): Top 42 – 8 Duels

Eighth episode results
Duel No.	Challenger	Category	Challenged	Winner's Time	Spaces Won (Total)	Choice
59	Morgan	Renaissance Faire	Steven	19 seconds left	16 spaces (17 total)	Floor
60	Tracy	Nuts & Seeds	Victor	29 seconds left	1 space (3 total)	Floor
61	Lauren	Voice Actors	Kyle	10 seconds left	1 space (2 total)	Floor
62	Dexter	Action Heroes	Anthony	20 seconds left	1 space (2 total)	Continued
63	Anthony	Global News (Inherited)	Steven	1 second left	17 spaces (19 total)	Floor
64	Demetria	U.S. Abbreviations	Kayleigh	5 seconds left	1 space (2 total)	Floor
65	Carlo	Festivals (Inherited)	Anthony	35 seconds left	1 space (20 total)	Continued
66	Anthony	Arithmetic	Ren	9 seconds left	20 spaces (22 total)	Continued

Week 8 (May 27, 2026): Top 34 – 9 Duels

Ninth episode results
Duel No.	Challenger	Category	Challenged	Winner's Time	Spaces Won (Total)	Choice
67	Ren	Birdwatching	Carlos	12 seconds left	22 spaces (23 total)	Continued
68	Carlos	Nature Sounds (Audio Duel)	Patrick	14 seconds left	23 spaces (24 total)	Continued
69	Patrick	Woodworking	Manny	35 seconds left	1 space (25 total)	Continued
70	Patrick	Pie Flavors	James	25 seconds left	1 space (26 total)	Floor
71	Donelle	Banking	Jason	8 seconds left	1 space (2 total)	Continued
72	Jason	Ocean Predators	Sean	22 seconds left	2 spaces (3 total)	Floor
73	Jonathan	Gas Stations (Inherited)	Dean	7 seconds left	16 spaces (17 total)	Continued
74	Jonathan	Rookie of the Year	Jordan	10 seconds left	1 space (18 total)	Continued
75	Jonathan	Basketball Players	Carolyn	21 seconds left	18 spaces (19 total)	Floor

Week 9 (June 3, 2026): Top 25 – 8 Duels

Tenth episode results
Duel No.	Challenger	Category	Challenged	Winner's Time	Spaces Won (Total)	Choice
76	Lana	Hardware Store	Bryan	13 seconds left	1 space (3 total)	Floor
77	Sierra	Handbags (Inherited)	Bryan	21 seconds left	3 spaces (4 total)	Continued
78	Sierra	Celebrity Siblings (Inherited)	Patrick (Note: Patrick chose to save the time boost for a later duel.)	14 seconds left	26 spaces (30 total)	Floor
79	James	Reality TV Winners	Neesh	13 seconds left	1 space (2 total)	Floor
80	Rebeckah	Internet Slang	Isabel	21 seconds left	1 space (2 total)	Continued
81	Isabel	Disney Live-Action	Sierra	18 seconds left	2 spaces (32 total)	Floor
82	Ngozi	Greek Life	Kelcie	26 seconds left	1 space (2 total)	Floor
83	Edie	Pageants (Inherited)	Paige	10 seconds left	1 space (11 total)	Continued

Week 10 Part 1 (June 10, 2026): Top 17 – 9 Duels

Eleventh episode results
Duel No.	Challenger	Category	Challenged	Winner's Time	Spaces Won (Total)	Choice
84	Paige	Plumbing	Dan	5 seconds left	1 space (12 total)	Continued
85	Paige (Note: Paige used and earned a time boost in this duel. Paige chose to save the time boost for a later duel in duels 83 and 84.)	Robots (Inherited)	Sierra	31 seconds left	32 spaces (44 total)	Floor
86	Jim	Biopics	Mark	8 seconds left	1 space (5 total)	Continued
87	Mark	Yacht Rock (Inherited)	Paige	33 seconds left	44 spaces (49 total)	Continued
88	Mark	Golf (Inherited)	Carolyn	16 seconds left	19 spaces (68 total)	Floor
89 (Note: Michael was the last contestant remaining with a one-square territory. Therefore, he was selected by default to play. From this point on, all the remaining contestants became eligible for the randomizer at any time. Eric was also unfrozen at this point.)	Michael	National Parks Postcards (Inherited)	Mark (Note: Mark chose to save the time boost for a later duel.)	15 seconds left	1 space (69 total)	Floor
90	Liz	Celebrity Santas (Inherited)	Mark	14 seconds left	2 spaces (71 total)	Continued
91	Mark	Legendary Lines	Kim	2 seconds left	2 spaces (73 total)	Continued
92	Mark	Cocktails (Association Duel, Inherited)	Sean	14 seconds left	73 spaces (76 total)	Continued

Week 10 Part 2 (June 10, 2026): Top 8 – 9 Duels

Twelfth episode results
Duel No.	Challenger	Category	Challenged	Winner's Time	Spaces Won (Total)	Choice	Final Duel Score
93	Sean	Wine Tasting (Inherited)	Kelcie	11 seconds left	76 spaces (78 total)	Continued	N/A
94	Kelcie	Barbershop (Inherited)	Kayleigh	18 seconds left	78 spaces (80 total)	Continued	N/A
95	Kayleigh	World Religion (Inherited)	Victor	28 seconds left	80 spaces (83 total)	Continued	N/A
96	Victor	Eco-Friendly Living (Inherited)	Eric	13 seconds left	9 spaces (92 total)	Continued	N/A
97	Victor	Cruise Destinations	Erin	15 seconds left	92 spaces (96 total)	Floor	N/A
98	James	Disney Muppets (Inherited)	Erin	15 seconds left	96 spaces (98 total)	Duel Choice: Country Flags, then Soap Operas	N/A
99	James	Country Flags	Lauren	33 seconds left	N/A	N/A	1–0
100	James	Soap Operas	Lauren	41 seconds left	N/A	N/A	1–1
101	James (Note: James was randomly selected to go first.)	Glassware (Tiebreaker)	Lauren	9 seconds left	98 spaces (100 total)	N/A	1–2

=== Season 6 ===
Week 1 (September 13, 2026): Top 100 – 8 Duels

First episode results
Duel No.	Challenger	Category	Challenged	Winner's Time	Spaces Won (Total)	Choice
1	James	Mini Golf	Jena	18 seconds left	1 space (2 total)	Floor
2	Geneviève	Peanuts Gang	Fatima	34 seconds left	1 space (2 total)	Continued
3	Fatima	K-Pop Artists (Inherited)	Jena	4 seconds left	2 spaces (4 total)	Floor
4	Riley	...Ologies	Dr. Tre	11 seconds left	1 space (2 total)	Floor
5	Brad	Measurements	Sabrina	4 seconds left	1 space (2 total)	Floor
6	Shawn	Sesame Street (Inherited)	Fatima	14 seconds left	4 spaces (5 total)	Floor
7	Ethan	Home Improvement	Jake	21 seconds left	1 space (2 total)	Continued
8	Ethan	Borrowed Words	Wellington	10 seconds left	2 spaces (3 total)	Floor

Week 2 (September 30, 2026): Top 92 – 8 Duels

Second episode results
Duel No.	Challenger	Category	Challenged	Winner's Time	Spaces Won (Total)	Choice
9	Bella	Preschool	Elizabeth	13 seconds left	1 space (2 total)	Floor
10	Savana	Muscles	Shamir	21 seconds left	1 space (2 total)	Continued
11	Shamir	Jumping	Henry	3 seconds left	2 spaces (3 total)	Continued
12	Henry	Action Sports	James	19 seconds left	1 space (4 total)	Floor
13	Guenther	Laundry (Inherited)	Dr. Tre	14 seconds left	2 spaces (3 total)	Continued
14	Guenther	Christmas Ornaments	Paige	24 seconds left	1 space (4 total)	Continued
15	Guenther	Aprés-Ski (Inherited)	Wellington	1 second left	3 spaces (7 total)	Shot Choice: Safety Gear (Craig); Floor
16	Craig	Compost	Travis	22 seconds left	1 space (2 total)	Floor

Week 3 (October 7, 2026): Top 84 – 9 Duels

Third episode results
Duel No.	Challenger	Category	Challenged	Winner's Time	Spaces Won (Total)	Choice
17	Frankie	Y2K Stars	Scott	8 seconds left	1 space (2 total)	Floor
18	Matt	Protein	Adrian	8 seconds left	1 space (2 total)	Continued
19	Adrian	DMV	Tailour	42 seconds left	2 spaces (3 total)	Continued
20	Tailour	Famous Vehicles	Shawn	28 seconds left	3 spaces (8 total)	Floor
21	Lari	Hasbro Games	Morgan	4 seconds left	1 space (2 total)	Floor
22	Gabi	Animal Calls (Audio Duel)	Eddie	23 seconds left	1 space (2 total)	Continued
23	Eddie	The Lincoln Era (Inherited)	Shawn	13 seconds left	8 spaces (10 total)	Floor
24	Moumita	Perfumes (Inherited)	Elizabeth	10 seconds left	2 spaces (3 total)	Floor
25	Hannah	Ballet	Avery	8 seconds left	1 space (2 total)	Continued

Week 4 (October 14, 2026): Top 75 – 8 Duels

Fourth episode results
Duel No.	Challenger	Category	Challenged	Winner's Time	Spaces Won (Total)	Choice
26	Avery	Out of Business	Denise	17 seconds left	2 spaces (3 total)	Continued
27	Denise	Heated Rivalries	Sydney	33 seconds left	3 spaces (4 total)	Floor
28	Audrey	Bakery	Melanie	7 seconds left	1 space (2 total)	Continued
29	Melanie	Weaponry	Dustin	16 seconds left	2 spaces (3 total)	Continued
30	Dustin	Vacation Destinations	Tyler	36 seconds left	3 spaces (4 total)	Continued
31	Tyler	Strength (Inherited)	Eddie	11 seconds left	10 spaces (14 total)	Continued
32	Tyler	State Fair	Catalina	21 seconds left	14 spaces (15 total)	Floor
33	Michael	Field Trips	Blake	33 seconds left	1 space (2 total)	Continued

Week 5 (October 21, 2026): Top 67 – 8 Duels

Fifth episode results
Duel No.	Challenger	Category	Challenged	Winner's Time	Spaces Won (Total)	Choice
34	Blake	Souvenirs	Maeve	4 seconds left	1 space (3 total)	Continued
35	Blake	Guinness World Records	Dan	12 seconds left	3 spaces (4 total)	Floor
36	Jonathan	Athleisure (Inherited)	Catalina	2 seconds left	15 spaces (16 total)	Floor
37	Meredith	Zombies	Sam	8 seconds left	1 space (2 total)	Floor
38	Valerie	Physical Education	Colin	13 seconds left	1 space (2 total)	Floor
39	Amber	Retirement Hobbies	Mike	12 seconds left	1 space (2 total)	Floor
40	Fred	Trades	Jonathan	25 seconds left	16 spaces (17 total)	Floor
41	AnnMarie	Eating Competitions	Michelle	22 seconds left	1 space (2 total)	Floor

Week 6 (November 4, 2026): Top 59 – 9 Duels

Sixth episode results
Duel No.	Challenger	Category	Challenged	Winner's Time	Spaces Won (Total)	Choice
42	Xavier	Shipwrecks	Guenther	23 seconds left	1 space (8 total)	Continued
43	Guenther	Bedroom Items	Ariel	29 seconds left	1 space (9 total)	Continued
44	Guenther	Hotels	Miles	9 seconds left	1 space (10 total)	Steal Choice: Photography (From Malachi); Continued
45	Guenther	Italian Cuisine	Ashley	1 second left	1 space (11 total)	Floor
46	Ivan	Pigs	Allie	5 seconds left	1 space (2 total)	Floor
47	Jason	Famous Babies	E.G.	32 seconds left	1 space (2 total)	Floor
48	Rashaad	Safety Gear (Inherited)	Travis	3 seconds left	1 space (3 total)	Floor
49	Eric	Facial Hair	Jaii	24 seconds left	1 space (2 total)	Floor
50	Troy	The Lion King	Krystle	8 seconds left	1 space (2 total)	Continued

Week 7 (November 11, 2026): Top 50 – 8 Duels

Seventh episode results
Duel No.	Challenger	Category	Challenged	Winner's Time	Spaces Won (Total)	Choice
51	Krystle	Birthday Parties	Caitlin	9 seconds left	2 spaces (3 total)	Floor
52	Jaleen	Southern Cookin'	Jason	2 seconds left	1 space (3 total)	Floor
53	Laila	Racing Events	Mikayla	36 seconds left	1 space (2 total)	Floor
54	Katie	Female Olympians	Deborah	12 seconds left	1 space (2 total)	Floor
55	Merideth	Wine Making	Adam	27 seconds left	1 space (2 total)	Continued
56	Adam	MTV Shows (Inherited)	Michelle	17 seconds left	2 spaces (4 total)	Continued
57	Adam	NBA & WNBA Logos (Inherited/Swapped)	Malachi	25 seconds left	4 spaces (5 total)	Floor
58	Nelson	Album of the Year	Callie	5 seconds left	1 space (2 total)	Continued

Week 8 (November 18, 2026): Top 42 – 9 Duels

Eighth episode results
Duel No.	Challenger	Category	Challenged	Winner's Time	Spaces Won (Total)	Choice
59	Nelson	Famous Scammers	Fred	2 seconds left	17 spaces (19 total)	Continued
60	Nelson	Needle Crafting (Inherited)	Colin	7 seconds left	2 spaces (21 total)	Shot Choice: International Cities (Victor); Floor
61	Victor	Photography (Stolen)	Guenther	12 seconds left	1 space (12 total)	Floor
62	Jessica	Art History	Ashley	32 seconds left	1 space (2 total)	Floor
63	Jessabelle	State Animals (Inherited)	Henry	12 seconds left	4 spaces (5 total)	Floor
64	LeVreese	Area Codes	Nelson	38 seconds left	1 space (22 total)	Floor
65	Carole	Estate Sale (Inherited)	Morgan	18 seconds left	1 space (3 total)	Floor
66	James	Nickelodeon Shows (Inherited)	Nelson	5 seconds left	1 space (23 total)	Continued
67	Nelson	International Cities (Association Duel, Inherited)	Guenther	2 seconds left	12 spaces (35 total)	TBA Week 9

Week 9 (November 26, 2026): Top 33 – TBA Duels

Ninth episode results
Duel No.	Challenger	Category	Challenged	Winner's Time	Spaces Won (Total)	Choice
68	TBA	TBA	TBA	TBA seconds left	TBA spaces (TBA total)	TBA
69	TBA	TBA	TBA	TBA seconds left	TBA spaces (TBA total)	TBA
70	TBA	TBA	TBA	TBA seconds left	TBA spaces (TBA total)	TBA
71	TBA	TBA	TBA	TBA seconds left	TBA spaces (TBA total)	TBA
72	TBA	TBA	TBA	TBA seconds left	TBA spaces (TBA total)	TBA
73	TBA	TBA	TBA	TBA seconds left	TBA spaces (TBA total)	TBA
74	TBA	TBA	TBA	TBA seconds left	TBA spaces (TBA total)	TBA
75	TBA	TBA	TBA	TBA seconds left	TBA spaces (TBA total)	TBA Week 10

== Episodes ==
=== Series overview ===
Season	Contestants	Episodes	Originally released		Winner	Runner-up
Season	Contestants	Episodes	First released	Last released	Winner	Runner-up
1	81	10	January 2, 2024	February 27, 2024	Jacquelyn Kenny	Arthur Von Werssowetz
2	100	12	September 25, 2024	December 18, 2024	Keelan von Ehrenkrook	Jennifer Strickland
3	100	12	February 9, 2025	April 23, 2025	Steven Havens	Andrew Edwards
4	100	12	September 24, 2025	December 17, 2025	Ashley Washburn	Josh Katz
5	100	12	April 8, 2026	June 10, 2026	Lauren Wise Samet	James Wallington
6	100	12	September 13, 2026	December 16, 2026	TBA	TBA

=== Season 1 (2024) ===
Winners of individual duels are shown in boldface shown as Challenger (randomized or choosing to play on)/Defender (chosen by challenger).

No. overall	No. in season	Title	Original release date	Prod. code	U.S. viewers (millions)	Rating/share (18–49)
1	1	"Let the Duel Begin"	January 2, 2024	FLR-101	2.56	0.41/5
Episode 1 Results: Duels played (7): Sid vs. **Zai** (Tools), Zai vs. **Greg** (Cars), Tory vs. **Natalia** (A Listers), Kat vs. **Jasper** (Songs About Places), **Jasper** vs. Christian (Popular Books), **Jasper** vs. Zane (Slogans), Josh vs. **Jasper** (Dogs); Episode/Prize winner: Jasper (5 spaces)
2	2	"This Is the Battle We've Been Waiting For"	January 9, 2024	FLR-102	2.60	0.44/5
Episode 2 Results: Duels played (8): Krystal vs. **Hannah** (Fashion Brands), Darin vs. **Greg** (Veggies), **Tom** vs. Charles (Toys), **Tom** vs. Natalia (Bugs), **Tom** vs. Greg (Cereals), Anne vs. **Jacquelyn** (TV Hosts), Kevin vs. **Tom** (Bands), Adinah vs. **Tom** (Sci-Fi); Episode/Prize winner: Tom (10 spaces)
3	3	"It's a Horror Show"	January 16, 2024	FLR-103	2.80	0.51/5
Episode 3 Results: Duels played (8): Brittany vs. **Jacquelyn** (Musicals), Nichole vs. **Alahna** (Cartoons), **Alahna** vs. Moriah (Medical Devices), **Stephanie** vs. Tom (Horror Movies), **Jennifer** vs. Zennie (Oscar Winners), Jennifer vs. **Sean** (College Teams), Sean vs. **James** (Moguls), James vs. **Liz** (Famous Sidekicks); Episode/Prize winner: Stephanie (11 spaces)
4	4	"Don't Judge This Book By Its Cover"	January 23, 2024	FLR-104	2.54	0.41/4
Episode 4 Results: Duels played (8): **Liz** vs. Eugene (Junk Drawer Items), Liz vs. **Steve** (Technology), **Steve** vs. Mondo (Idioms), Dani vs. **Stephanie** (Brunch), Sarah vs. **Victoria** (Tourist Hotspots), Victoria vs. **Steve** (Spices & Condiments), **Steve** vs. Will (Sports Equipment), **Steve** vs. Lucas (Movie Quotes); Episode/Prize winners: Stephanie & Steve (12 spaces each)
5	5	"I Did Not See That Coming"	January 30, 2024	FLR-105	2.57	0.49/5
Episode 5 Results: Duels played (8): **Ford** vs. Michelle (Famous Animals), **Ford** vs. Hannah (Fast Food), **Luis** vs. Ross (Divas), Luis vs. **Kaylee** (Candy), **Sunnie** vs. Steve (Celebrities on The Simpsons), Alayna vs. **Stephanie** (Birds), Pasquale vs. **Cher** (Child Stars), **Cher** vs. Khalil (Mobile Apps); Episode/Prize winners: Stephanie & Sunnie (13 spaces each)
6	6	"You Can Run but You Can't Hide"	February 6, 2024	FLR-106	2.60	0.46/5
Episode 6 Results: Duels played (8): Mark vs. **Lindsey** (Political Candidates), Sarah vs. **Stephanie** (Kids’ Books), Mark vs. **Jasper** (Rock Stars), Jasper vs. **Anne** (Nepo Babies), **Joey** vs. Cher (Bathroom Items), **Joey** vs. Tommy (Space), **Joey** vs. Sunnie (Desserts), **Joey** vs. Ford (Clothing & Accessories); Episode/Prize winner: Joey (22 spaces)
7	7	"The BBQ Showdown"	February 13, 2024	FLR-107	2.43	0.42/5
Episode 7 Results: Duels played (9): David vs. **Joey** (Wild Animals), David vs. **Stephanie** (Drinks), Stephanie vs. **Anne** (BBQ), **Anne** vs. Adam (Reality TV), Anne vs. **Gene** (Comedians), **Angie** vs. Joey (Famous Hair), **Gabriel** vs. Angie (Transportation), **Claire** vs. Michael (Shoes), Chris vs. **Gabriel** (Fruits); Episode/Prize winner: Gabriel (26 spaces)
8	8	"The Professor"	February 20, 2024	FLR-108	2.51	0.41/5
Episode 8 Results: Duels played (8): John vs. **Gabriel** (The Human Body), Joel vs. **Gabriel** (World Capitals), Gabriel vs. **Nicholas** (Instruments), Michael vs. **Nicholas** (Flags), Laphea vs. **Nicholas** (Historic Headlines), **Nicholas** vs. Andrew (History Makers), Austin vs. **Nicholas** (Kitchenware), **Matthew** vs. Nicholas (Sports Movies); Episode/Prize winner: Matthew (34 spaces)
9	9	"All Hail the King of The Floor"	February 27, 2024	FLR-109	2.09	0.36/4
Episode 9 Results: Duels played (8): Jennifer vs. **Gene** (One Hit Wonders), **Gene** vs. Tiffany (Hip Hop), **Gene** vs. Heidi (80s TV), Tim vs. **Claire** (Geography), **Riley** vs. Kaylee (Snacks), Tucker vs. **Gene** (Games), **Gene** vs. Dyllan (Movie Characters), **Gene** vs. Claire (TV Show Locations); Episode/Prize winner: Matthew (34 spaces)
10	10	"Tonight, I'm Going to Make History"	February 27, 2024	FLR-110	2.33	0.39/4
Episode 10 Results: Duels played (8): Gene vs. **Matthew** (Athletes), **Matthew** vs. Lindsey (U.S. States), **Matthew** vs. Kwame (Olympic Events), Matthew vs. **Arthur** (Best Picture Winners), **Arthur** vs. Joanie (Hobbies), **Arthur** vs. Alahna (Country Music), **Arthur** vs. Riley (Plants), **Jacquelyn** vs. Arthur (Fashion Icons); Season winner: Jacquelyn

=== Season 2 (2024) ===
Winners of individual duels are shown in boldface shown as Challenger (randomized or choosing to play on)/Defender (chosen by Challenger). Time boosts earned are shown in Italics. Time boosts used are shown in Underline.

No. overall	No. in season	Title	Original release date	Prod. code	U.S. viewers (millions)	Rating/share (18–49)
11	1	"Activate the Randomizer!"	September 25, 2024	FLR-201	2.23	0.39/5
Episode 1 Results: Duels played (8): Wade vs. **Marley** (Farm Life), Joshua vs. **Marley** (School Supplies), Marley vs. **Ryan** (Tailgating), Lisa vs. **Sharday** (Beauty), Maggie vs. **Megan** (Halloween Costumes), Josue vs. **Vanessa** (On Safari), Michael vs. **Ali** (Restaurant Chains), **Angie** vs. Andrew (Stocks); Episode/Prize winner: Ryan (4 spaces)
12	2	"They Rise & They Fall"	October 2, 2024	FLR-202	2.08	0.30/4
Episode 2 Results: Duels played (8): **Angie** vs. Will (Acronyms), **Angie** vs. Izzy (Baked Goods), Cyrene vs. **Landis** (Pizza Toppings), **Mena** vs. Monica (Taylor Swift Songs), **Keelan** vs. Sage (Professions), **Julie Ann** vs. Heather (Sitcoms), **Julie Ann** vs. Ryan (Cleaning Brands), **Neal** vs. Eric (Holiday Movies); Episode/Prize winner: Julie Ann (6 spaces)
13	3	"Bluff or Bust"	October 9, 2024	FLR-203	1.94	0.34/3
Episode 3 Results: Duels played (9): Neal vs. **Chelsey** (At The Mall), Emily vs. **Sharday** (Cheese), Kaitlin vs. **James** (Smoothies), Emily vs. **Maureen** (Young Adult Novels), **Maureen** vs. Robert (Superstars), Maureen vs. **Haley** (Playbills), Haley vs. **Jessica** (Recess), Chris vs. **Julie Ann** (Disco), Tudi vs. **Andrew** (Game Night); Episode/Prize winner: Julie Ann (7 spaces)
14	4	"The Triple Threat"	October 16, 2024	FLR-204	2.10	0.34/4
Episode 4 Results: Duels played (8): Andrew vs. **Chelsey** (World Currencies), Ben vs. **Kara** (Triple Threats), **Kara** vs. Chelsey (Daytime TV), **Kara** vs. Jessica (Gen Z), Morgan vs. **Kara** (Brand Mascots), Andrew vs. **Jake** (Action Films), **Jake** vs. Vanessa (Paintings), **Jake** vs. Kilah (Vending Machines); Episode/Prize winner: Kara (13 spaces)
15	5	"High Risk, High Reward?"	October 23, 2024	FLR-205	2.03	0.32/4
Episode 5 Results: Duels played (8): Jake vs. **Ali** (Constellations), Emily vs. **Kara** (Compound Words), Ryan Alan vs. **Spiro** (Baseball Logos), **Grace** vs. Kelly (Circus), **Grace** vs. Tommy (Ocean Animals), Grace vs. **Corey** (Coming of Age Movies), **Corey** vs. Julie Ann (Wrestlers), **Corey** vs. Ronald (Carnival Food); Episode/Prize winner: Kara (14 spaces)
16	6	"Halfway to $250k"	November 6, 2024	FLR-206	1.99	0.30/4
Episode 6 Results: Duels played (9): Corey vs. **Melissa** (Fitness), Melissa vs. **Anand** (American Inventions), Anand vs. **Mack** (Star Wars), **Mack** vs. Carlos (Weather), **Mack** vs. Landis (Blockbuster Movies), **Mia** vs. Spiro (Cooking), Gregg vs. **Nate** (Beach), **Trevor** vs. Kara (Musical Instruments), Lia vs. **Mack** (Pop Stars); Episode/Prize winner: Mack (19 spaces)
17	7	"Who's Afraid of Virginia the Wolf?"	November 13, 2024	FLR-207	2.19	0.33/4
Episode 7 Results: Duels played (8): **Mack** vs. Lauren (The Military), Mack vs. **Paolo** (Gems), Paolo vs. **Sharday** (Kids' Shows), Talia vs. **Jayna** (Best Sellers), **Virginia** vs. Sharday (State Flags), **Virginia** vs. Trevor (Holistic Spirituality), **Cristian** vs. Robby (State Capitals), Cristian vs. **Virginia** (Flowers); Episode/Prize winner: Virginia (42 spaces)
18	8	"Go Big or Go Home"	November 20, 2024	FLR-208	2.06	0.27/3
Episode 8 Results: Duels played (8): **Jeremy** vs. Virginia (DIY), Holly vs. **Lili** (Puppies), **Jennifer** vs. Sabrina (Skylines), **Austin** vs. Mia (World History), **Austin** vs. Paul (New York), Austin vs. **Danny** (Animal Sounds), **Danny** vs. Zuri (Female Athletes), **Danny** vs. Jeremy (Alternative Music); Episode/Prize winner: Danny (50 spaces)
19	9	"A Whale of a Time"	November 28, 2024	FLR-209	2.68	0.56/5
Episode 9 Results: Duels played (9): **Michael** vs. Sydney (Autumn), Alicia vs. **Paul** (Car Parts), Danny vs. **Danny** (Failed Political Candidates), Amy vs. **Tim** (Extreme Sports), Tim vs. **Danny** (Halloween Movies), Lisa vs. **Alex** (Global Monuments), **Jessica** vs. Sarah (Female Leaders), **Jessica** vs. Danny (Nursery Rhymes), Joanna vs. **Jennifer** (Beans); Episode/Prize winner: Jessica (55 spaces)
20	10	"Heartbreak and Headaches"	December 4, 2024	FLR-210	2.39	0.35/4
Episode 10 Results: Duels played (8): **Jennifer** vs. David (American History), Trenton vs. **Catherine** (Hockey), **Kevin** vs. Cassandra (Reality TV Stars), Brandi vs. **Jessica** (Girl Groups), **Jessica** vs. Alex (R&B), Jessica vs. **Rita** (Disney Characters), Rita vs. **Ali** (Ancient Egypt), **Nery** vs. Bryan (Beer); Episode/Prize winner: Ali (66 spaces)
21	11	"Everyone is a Target"	December 11, 2024	FLR-211	2.41	0.32/4
Episode 11 Results: Duels played (8): **Dan** vs. Ali (Spinoff Bands), Dan vs. **Mick** (British Invasion), Mick vs. **Paul** (Medieval Times), Paul vs. **Megan** (Las Vegas), Megan vs. **Kevin** (Art Supplies), **Kevin** vs. Lili (College Mascots), **Kevin** vs. Nery (Stand-Up Comedians), **Kevin** vs. James (News Personalities); Episode/Prize winner: Kevin (80 spaces)
22	12	"The Final Showdown"	December 18, 2024	FLR-212	2.53	0.35/5
Episode 12 Results: Duels played (9): Mena vs. **Angie** (Based on a True Story), **Angie** vs. Kevin (Game Show Hosts), **Jayna** vs. Angie (Accessories), Jayna vs. **Nate** (National Parks), Nate vs. **Catherine** (Lab Equipment), Michael vs. **Catherine** (Shakespeare), **Jennifer** vs. Catherine (Sneakers), Jennifer vs. **Keelan** (Periodic Table: Keelan, CEOs: Keelan; final result: 0–2); Season winner: Keelan

=== Season 3 (2025) ===
Winners of individual duels are shown in boldface shown as Challenger (randomized or choosing to play on)/Defender (chosen by Challenger). Time boosts earned are shown in Italics. Time boosts used are shown in Underline.

No. overall	No. in season	Title	Original release date	Prod. code	U.S. viewers (millions)	Rating/share (18–49)
23	1	"Season 3 Kicks Off"	February 9, 2025	FLR-301	13.94	3.70/37
Episode 1 Results: Duels played (8): **Lisa** vs. Jamella (Pantry Items), **Madeline** vs. Dayna (Pets), **Madeline** vs. Carli (Ancient History), Hennessy vs. **Mike** (Mountains), Jordan vs. **Logan** (Home Decor), **Logan** vs. Nikki (Gardening), **Logan** vs. Noell (Children's Literature), Haji vs. **Dara** (Ice Cream Flavors); Episode/Prize winner: Logan (4 spaces)
24	2	"Star Power"	February 12, 2025	FLR-302	2.40	0.32/4
Episode 2 Results: Duels played (8): Dara vs. **Laura** (Antiques), **Cody** vs. Carolyne (Female Country Singers), Cody vs. **Michael** (SNL Alumni), **Alex** vs. Darlene (Sushi), LaShonda vs. **Brian** (Convenience Store Items), **Brian** vs. Madeline (Landmark Architecture), **Brian** vs. Logan (Classic Films), Jahmani vs. **Brianna** (Breakfast); Episode/Prize winner: Brian O'Halloran (9 spaces)
25	3	"Fresh Faces, High Stakes"	February 19, 2025	FLR-303	2.25	0.31/4
Episode 3 Results: Duels played (9): Brianna vs. **Nick** (Black and White), Garrett vs. **Mike** (Islands), Magic vs. **Kent** (Summer Olympic Events), **Marc** vs. Kent (Doomsday Prep), Marc vs. **Michael** (Sandwich Ingredients), **Steven** vs. Laura (Airport codes), **Mark** vs. Brian (Electronics), Kenny vs. **Eric** (Rappers), **Terry** vs. Seth (Sports MVPs); Episode/Prize winner: Brian O'Halloran (9 spaces)
26	4	"A Twist In the Game"	February 26, 2025	FLR-304	2.32	0.32/4
Episode 4 Results: Duels played (8): Matthew vs. **Clint** (Sports Films), Jeremy vs. **Nick** (College Basketball), Benedetta vs. **Alex** (Yoga), Alex vs. **Brian** (20th Century Inventions), **Sifat** vs. Michael (Star Trek), **Shannon** vs. Liz (Agriculture), Shannon vs. **Toni** (Math – Multiplication), **Toni** vs. Lillie (Fantasy Films); Episode/Prize winner: Brian O'Halloran (11 spaces)
27	5	"Strategic Showdown"	March 5, 2025	FLR-305	2.01	0.27/4
Episode 5 Results: Duels played (8): **Toni** vs. Nick (TV Moms), Damon vs. **Andrew** (Mythical Creatures), Hank vs. **Elena** (Iconic Duos), Barbie vs. **Sifat** (Met Gala), Zack vs. **Magan** (Derby), **Magan** vs. Steve (Collectibles), **Magan** vs. Julian (Fictional Fathers), Wyatt vs. **Brian** (Directors); Episode/Prize winner: Brian O'Halloran (12 spaces)
28	6	"Call My Bluff"	March 12, 2025	FLR-306	2.25	0.32/4
Episode 6 Results: Duels played (9): Michele vs. **Priscilla** (Stars with Stars – Hollywood Walk of Fame), Bradley vs. **Kimberley** (Toiletries), Kimberley vs. **Alex** (Natural History), **Alex** vs. Jameela (Kitchen Appliances), **Alex** vs. Elena (Rock & Roll Hall of Fame), **Alex** vs. Ira (Real Housewives), **Robin** vs. Cherif (Space Travel), James vs. **Shane** (Oceanography), Clarione vs. **Steven** (TV Chefs); Episode/Prize winner: Brian O'Halloran (12 spaces)
29	7	"A New Contender"	March 19, 2025	FLR-307	2.03	0.26/3
Episode 7 Results: Duels played (8): **Baron** vs. Priscilla (Backyard Games), Cassie vs. **Jay** (Congress), Jay vs. **Brian** (Rodeo), Phil vs. **Amanda** (Pasta), Spark vs. **Sifat** (Latin Musicians), Sifat vs. **Stephanie** (Crayon Colors), **Stephanie** vs. Jeorgi (Tony Winners), Stephanie vs. **Mike** (Hunting & Camping); Episode/Prize winners: Brian O'Halloran & Mike (14 spaces each)
30	8	"Let's Get Physical"	March 26, 2025	FLR-308	2.24	0.31/4
Episode 8 Results: Duels played (8): **Mike** vs. Anna Leigh (Competition Shows), **Mike** vs. Robin (State Quarters), Katie vs. **Mariana** (The Amazon), Mariana vs. **Emily** (Teen Dramas), Katina vs. **Mike** (Rom-Coms), Ashley vs. **Shane** (Parades), **Shane** vs. Mike (Physics), Jake vs. **Shane** (Beyonce Songs); Episode/Prize winner: Shane (22 spaces)
31	9	"A Hot Streak"	April 2, 2025	FLR-309	2.35	0.32/4
Episode 9 Results: Duels played (9): Shane vs. **Devin** (Road Trip), Devin vs. **Eric** (Travel Accessories), **Eric** vs. Mary-Ellen (Changemakers), **Eric** vs. Slim (Medicine), Kevin vs. **Andrew** (Puppets), Marcus vs. **Eric** (Nerdy Characters), Anthony vs. **Brian** (Aviation), Kaylie vs. **Eric** (Critters), **Kathy** vs. Eric (Billionaires); Episode/Prize winner: Kathy (30 spaces)
32	10	"Courage Under Fire"	April 9, 2025	FLR-310	2.55	0.29/4
Episode 10 Results: Duels played (8): Sharon vs. **Makenna** (Baby Products), Makenna vs. **Brian** (Haunted Locations), Mari vs. **Ted** (Punctuation and Symbols), Laura vs. **Amanda** (Song of the Year), Alex vs. **Toni** (Anatomy), **Toni** vs. Emily (Water Brands), Tyler vs. **Brian** (Construction), Ashlee vs. **Kathy** (Murder Mysteries); Episode/Prize winner: Kathy (31 spaces)
33	11	"Bringing Down A Titan"	April 16, 2025	FLR-311	2.34	0.34/4
Episode 11 Results: Duels played (8): **Zaph** vs. Brian (Fairy Tales & Fables), **Zaph** vs. Amanda (Languages), Zaph vs. **Baron** (Marvel), Baron vs. **Clint** (Classic Cars), **David** vs. Clint (Eras), **Laurel** vs. Kathy (Authors), Lisa vs. **David** (European Geography), **David** vs. Terry (Bodies of Water); Episode/Prize winners: Laurel & David (32 spaces each)
34	12	"Conquer The Floor"	April 23, 2025	FLR-312	2.62	0.35/4
Episode 12 Results: Duels played (10): Laurel vs. **Ted** (Hotels & Motels), **Ted** vs. Magan (Trees), **Ted** vs. Mark (Fortune 500), **Toni** vs. Ted (The Crown), Toni vs. **David** (Weddings), **David** vs. Alex (Poetry), David vs. **Andrew** (Endangered Animals), Andrew vs. **Steven** (Boy Bands: Steven, Cosplay: Andrew, International Foods: Steven; final result: 1–2); Season winner: Steven

=== Season 4 (2025) ===
Winners of individual duels are shown in boldface shown as Challenger (randomized or choosing to play on)/Defender (chosen by Challenger). Advantages earned are shown in Italics (the specific advantage is in parentheses). Advantages used are shown in Underline.

No. overall	No. in season	Title	Original release date	Prod. code	U.S. viewers (millions)	Rating/share (18–49)
35	1	"The Battle of The States"	September 24, 2025	FLR-401	2.12	0.25/4
Episode 1 Results: Duels played (8): Charlie (TX) vs. **Rick (WI)** (Fried Foods), Elizabeth (VT) vs. **Marcia (GA)** (Pet Supplies), Laura (MN) vs. **Frank (UT)** (Formal Wear), Frank (UT) vs. **Justin (UT)** (Hall of Famers), Jackie (GA) vs. **Demetrice (AL)** (Villains), Ricky (AK) vs. **Cibelle (NY)** (Famous Couples), **Luke (NM)** vs. Justin (UT) (Sandra Bullock Films), **Jonny (OR)** vs. Kwame (AZ) (Stamps); Episode/Prize winner: Luke (4 spaces); States Eliminated: Utah
36	2	"Nowhere to Hide"	October 1, 2025	FLR-402	2.13	0.22/3
Episode 2 Results: Duels played (8): Jonny (OR) vs. **Marcia (GA)** (Sitcom Families), **Marcia (GA)** vs. Evan (NE) (Food Holidays), **Tim (NY)** vs. Marcia (GA) (Platinum Vinyl Albums), **David (ID)** vs. Brittany (CT) (Dollar Store), David (ID) vs. **Katelyn (AL)** (Theme Parties), Delante (MD) vs. **Tim (NY)** (Junkyard), **Molly (KY)** vs. Heather (MO) (Variety Acts), **Ty (ID)** vs. Tim (NY) (Real Estate); Episode/Prize winner: Ty (8 spaces); States Eliminated: Georgia
37	3	"History is Made"	October 8, 2025	FLR-403	2.20	0.28/4
Episode 3 Results: Duels played (9): Dom (RI) vs. **Christina (CO)** (Chip Brands), Dash (CT) vs. **Brad (NM)** (Commodities), Bo (TN) vs. **Kiera (WI)** (Mammals), Kiera (WI) vs. **Sam (OR)** (Viral Moments), Sam (OR) vs. **Erin (IA)** (Simpsons Characters), **Erin (IA)** vs. Kristy (WV) (Banned Books), Erin (IA) vs. **Ashley (CA)** (Theme Parks), **Ashley (CA)** vs. Ty (ID) (Brat Pack), **Ashley (CA) (Category Steal)** vs. Kyle (RI) (Emmy-Winning TV Shows); Episode/Prize winner: Ashley (15 spaces); States Eliminated: Connecticut, Oregon, Idaho, Rhode Island
38	4	"All is Fair in Love and Floor"	October 15, 2025	FLR-404	2.21	0.23/3
Episode 4 Results: Duels played (9): **Jason (MT)** vs. Tom (MI) (Impressions), **Megan (OH)** vs. Carlheb (MA) (Telling Time), Megan (OH) vs. **Aaron (NC)** (Public Transit), **Aaron (NC)** vs. Bo (OK) (Red Carpet), **Aaron (NC) (Time Boost)** vs. Kristi (SD) (Buffet), **Aaron (NC)** vs. Victoria (FL) (TED Talk), **Aaron (NC)** vs. Harley (NJ) (High School), **Aaron (NC) (Category Steal)** vs. Katelyn (AL) (Fictional Creatures), **Aaron (NC)** vs. Ashley (CA) (Coffee); Episode/Prize winner: Aaron (25 spaces), Jason (Golden Square); States Eliminated: None
39	5	"Karma"	October 22, 2025	FLR-405	2.33	0.27/4
Episode 5 Results: Duels played (8): **Arlene (MN)** vs. Idecia (MS) (Food Pairings), **Ashton (LA)** vs. Dorian (AZ) (Lisa Frank), **Matt (TX)** vs. Shelby (VA) (Movie Musicals), Tania (DE) vs. **Josh (AR)** (Playing Cards), **Elizabeth (DE)** vs. Arlene (MN) (Houseplants), **Elizabeth (DE)** vs. Leigh (VT) (Famous Criminals), **Elizabeth (DE) (Category Steal)** vs. Cibelle (NY) (Great Outdoors), **Elizabeth (DE)** vs. Aaron (NC) (Regency Era); Episode/Prize winner: Elizabeth (31 spaces); States Eliminated: Arizona, Minnesota, Vermont, New York
40	6	"Reign Under Fire"	November 5, 2025	FLR-406	2.35	0.27/4
Episode 6 Results: Duels played (8): **Mark (KY)** vs. Liliana (NV) (Tablescapes), Mark (KY) vs. **Elizabeth (DE)** (Harry Potter), Elizabeth (DE) vs. **Kelsey (SD)** (Holiday Foods), **Kelsey (SD)** vs. Christina (CO) (Monopoly), Kelsey (SD) vs. **Luke (NM)** (On-Screen Judges), Luke (NM) vs. **Charlie (MI)** (Scents), **Jonathan (NJ)** vs. Charlie (MI) (Junk Food), **Jonathan (NJ)** vs. Bob (NH) (Combat Films); Episode/Prize winner: Jonathan (43 spaces); States Eliminated: Delaware, South Dakota, Michigan
41	7	"Playing Offense"	November 12, 2025	FLR-407	2.52	0.34/5
Episode 7 Results: Duels played (9): **Jonathan (NJ) (Time Boost)** vs. Ashton (LA) (Ghost Stories), Andre (VA) vs. **Eric (MD)** (Box Office Flops), **Eric (MD)** vs. Jeff (IL) (U.S. Stadiums), Eric (MD) vs. **Rebecca (NE)** (Fruit Trees), **Rebecca (NE)** vs. Demetrice (AL) (Superfoods), Rebecca (NE) vs. **Jason (MT)** (Summer Camp), Aaron (IN) vs. **Debbie (WV)** (Deli), Debbie (WV) vs. **Josh (SC)** (Marching Band), Josh (SC) vs. **Ashley (IL)** (Witchcraft); Episode/Prize winner: Jonathan (45 spaces); States Eliminated: Virginia, Maryland, Alabama, Nebraska, West Virginia
42	8	"Battle of the Besties"	November 19, 2025	FLR-408	2.20	0.23/4
Episode 8 Results: Duels played (9): **Ashley (IL)** vs. Mark (OK) (Country Music Awards), **Ashley (IL) (Time Boost)** vs. Sadia (CA) (Canadian Icons), Sergio (CO) vs. **Jonathan (NJ)** (Podcasters), **Jonathan (NJ)** vs. LaTasha (SC) (Phobias), **Jonathan (NJ) (Category Steal)** vs. Andrea (IA) (Disney Animation), **Julie (ND)** vs. Jonny (IN) (Famous Teachers), Emily (NC) vs. **Jasmine (WA)** (Energy Drinks), Jasmine (WA) vs. **Frank (HI)** (Terms of Endearment), Haley (LA) vs. **Ben (PA)** (Junk in the Trunk); Episode/Prize winner: Jonathan (48 spaces); States Eliminated: Oklahoma, California, Colorado, South Carolina, Iowa, Indiana, North Carolina, Louisiana
43	9	"The Knives Are Out"	December 3, 2025	FLR-409	2.39	0.26/4
Episode 9 Results: Duels played (8): **Ben (PA)** vs. Frank (HI) (Crime-Fighting Duos), Ben (PA) vs. **Marques (HI)** (Gymnastics), Zach (ME) vs. **Jonathan (NJ)** (Book Adaptations), Jonathan (NJ) vs. **Lukas (NV)** (Pez Dispensers), Anshpreet (TN) vs. **Rick (MA)** (Presidents), **Rick (MA)** vs. Lukas (NV) (New England), Rick (MA) vs. **Marques (HI)** (Fishing), **Laz (FL)** vs. Marques (HI) (Luxury Car Brands); Episode/Prize winner: Laz (59 spaces); States Eliminated: New Jersey, Tennessee, Nevada, Massachusetts, Hawaii
44	10	"Semi-Final Showdown"	December 10, 2025	FLR-410	2.57	0.31/5
Episode 10 Results: Duels played (8): **Jacob (OH)** vs. Gary (WA) (Leather), **Nicki (NH)** vs. Laz (FL) (Arcade), Nicki (NH) vs. **Julie (ND)** (Christmas), **Julie (ND)** vs. Jason (MT) (State Nicknames), Julie (ND) vs. **Armand (KS)** (Mattel Toys), **Armand (KS)** vs. Brad (NM) (Hip Hop Stars), Armand (KS) vs. **Matt (TX)** (Exercise Moves), **Valerie (PA)** vs. Matt (TX) (Home Organization); Episode/Prize winner: Valerie (76 spaces); States Eliminated: Washington, Florida, New Hampshire, New Mexico, Texas
45	11	"Fight to the Finish"	December 17, 2025	FLR-411	2.48	0.29/5
Episode 11 Results: Duels played (8): **Nicole (MO)** vs. Bailey (WY) (Dentist Office), Courtney (MS) vs. **Clara (MT)** (State Flowers), Jeremy (ND) vs. **Valerie (PA)** (White House), Valerie (PA) vs. **Jezrael (KS)** (Swamplands), **Jezrael (KS)** vs. Clara (MT) (Car Racing), Jezrael (KS) vs. **Rick (WI)** (Wild West), Rick (WI) vs. **Jacob (OH)** (Beatles Songs), Kurt (AR) vs. **Jacob (OH)** (Roman Numerals); Most Territory: Jacob (85 spaces); States Eliminated: Mississippi, North Dakota, Pennsylvania, Montana, Kansas, Wisconsin
46	12	"The Winner is Crowned"	December 17, 2025	FLR-412	2.41	0.21/5
Episode 12 Results: Duels played (8): Sydney (WY) vs. **Austin (AK)** (Arctic Circle), Tim (ME) vs. **Jacob (OH)** (Geometry), **Jacob (OH)** vs. Austin (AK) (American Revolution), Jacob (OH) vs. **Molly (KY)** (Paleontology), Molly (KY) vs. **Nicole (MO)** (Biology), Nicole (MO) vs. **Josh (AR)** (Bones), Josh (AR) vs. **Ashley (IL)** (Ancient Greece: Ashley, Sportscasters: Ashley; final result: 0–2); States Eliminated: Wyoming, Maine, Alaska, Ohio, Kentucky, Missouri, Arkansas; Season Winner (Winning State): Ashley (Illinois)

=== Season 5 (2026) ===
Winners of individual duels are shown in boldface shown as Challenger (randomized or choosing to play on)/Defender (chosen by Challenger). Advantages earned are shown in Italics (the specific advantage is in parentheses). Advantages used are shown in Underline.

No. overall	No. in season	Title	Original release date	Prod. code	U.S. viewers (millions)	Rating/share (18–49)
47	1	"New Year, New Floor"	April 8, 2026	FLR-501	N/A	TBA
Episode 1 Results: Duels played (8): **Jonathan** vs. Shanra (Sitcom Characters), Jonathan vs. **Taj** (Pool Party), Sean vs. **Ashlin** (Female Pioneers), Ashlin vs. **Cierra** (Office Supplies), **Cierra** vs. Jerrol (Seafood), Vanessa vs. **David** (Carbonated Beverages), Alan vs. **Ahmad** (Grilling), **Deon** vs. Cierra (Engineering Marvels); Episode/Prize winner: Deon (5 spaces)
48	2	"The Expert-Slayer Strikes"	April 8, 2026	FLR-502	N/A	TBA
Episode 2 Results: Duels played (8): **Bryan** vs. Ella (Train Travel), **Mark** vs. Greg (Bowling), **Mark** vs. Brooke (Time Magazine Covers), **Mark (Time Boost)** vs. Michelle (Household Chores), Justin vs. **Kristin** (Lord of the Rings), **Mike** vs. Terilisha (Classic Toys), Kat vs. **David** (Sexiest Man Alive), Brad vs. **Ryan** (Box Office Hits); Episode/Prize winner: Deon (5 spaces)
49	3	"A Ringleader Rises"	April 15, 2026	FLR-503	N/A	TBA
Episode 3 Results: Duels played (9): Ryan vs. **Kristin** (Iconic Sayings), Kristin vs. **Eric** (Kids Party), **Eric** vs. Jenny (Gaming), **Eric (Time Boost)** vs. Ja'Meisha (Kitchen Tools), **Kim** vs. Shawn (Bobbleheads), Anastasia vs. **Rebecca** (Baked Dishes), Lawrenzo vs. **Gigi** (One-Name Stars), Gigi vs. **Wook** (Famous Dogs), Wook vs. **Kayla** (New Year's Eve); Episode/Prize winner: Eric (7 spaces)
50	4	"Fireworks on the Floor"	April 22, 2026	FLR-504	N/A	TBA
Episode 4 Results: Duels played (8): Kayla vs. **Josh** (Tattoos), Josh vs. **Taj** (Sundae Toppings), Nikki vs. **Eric** (Balls), **Eric** vs. Maria (World Soccer), **Victor** vs. Taneya (Home Remedies), **Melanie** vs. David (Dance Movies), **Liz** vs. Ryan (Scary Movies), Abdul vs. **Kristen** (Comedy Headliners); Episode/Prize winner: Eric (9 spaces)
51	5	"Sister Act"	April 29, 2026	FLR-505	N/A	TBA
Episode 5 Results: Duels played (8): Kristen vs. **Mallory** (Doctor's Office), **Kay** vs. Mallory (Emojis), Kay vs. **Lissette** (Vegetable Garden), **Erin** vs. Arianny (Iconic Eyes), **Erin** vs. Rebecca (Lego), **Meg** vs. Nwamaka (Coming-of-Age TV), **Meg** vs. Lissette (Oregon Trail), Meg vs. **Paige** (Bravo Stars); Episode/Prize winner: Eric (9 spaces)
52	6	"Sweet Revenge"	May 6, 2026	FLR-506	N/A	TBA
Episode 6 Results: Duels played (9): **Paige** vs. Kiley (Romance Movies), **Paige (Time Boost)** vs. Reggie (Machines), **Kristen** vs. Will (Air Travel), **Kristen** vs. Emmanuel (Track & Field), **Kristen (Category Steal)** vs. Melanie (Book Club), **Kristen** vs. Deon (Halftime Shows), Austin vs. **Ren** (Spa Day), Rachel vs. **Kristen** (Barbie), Madison vs. **Taj** (Roman Empire); Episode/Prize winner: Kristen (13 spaces)
53	7	"Who Will Win the Territory Freeze?"	May 13, 2026	FLR-507	N/A	TBA
Episode 7 Results: Duels played (8): Taj vs. **Kelita** (Ad Slogans), **Kelita** vs. Michael (Summer), **Kelita (Time Boost)** vs. Ahmad (Family Bands), Mike vs. **Kelita** (Black & White Movies), Kelita vs. **Dean** (Music Class), **Jess** vs. Kristen (ABBA), **Jess** vs. Leslie (Nocturnal Animals), Jess vs. **Morgan** (Crochet Items); Episode/Prize winners: Morgan & Dean (16 spaces each); Territory Freeze winner: Eric (9 spaces, 5 duel wins)
54	8	"New Faces, New Threats"	May 20, 2026	FLR-508	N/A	TBA
Episode 8 Results: Duels played (8): Morgan vs. **Steven** (Renaissance Faire), Tracy vs. **Victor** (Nuts & Seeds), **Lauren** vs. Kyle (Voice Actors), Dexter vs. **Anthony** (Action Heroes), **Anthony** vs. Steven (Global News), Demetria vs. **Kayleigh** (U.S. Abbreviations), Carlo vs. **Anthony** (Festivals), Anthony vs. **Ren** (Arithmetic); Episode/Prize winner: Ren (22 spaces)
55	9	"A Winning Streak"	May 27, 2026	FLR-509	N/A	TBA
Episode 9 Results: Duels played (9): Ren vs. **Carlos** (Birdwatching), Carlos vs. **Patrick** (Nature Sounds), **Patrick** vs. Manny (Woodworking), **Patrick (Time Boost)** vs. James (Pie Flavors), Donelle vs. **Jason** (Banking), Jason vs. **Sean** (Ocean Predators), **Jonathan** vs. Dean (Gas Stations), **Jonathan** vs. Jordan (Rookie of the Year), Jonathan vs. **Carolyn** (Basketball Players); Episode/Prize winner: Patrick (26 spaces)
56	10	"Wolves at the Door"	June 3, 2026	FLR-510	N/A	TBA
Episode 10 Results: Duels played (8): Lana vs. **Bryan** (Hardware Store), **Sierra** vs. Bryan (Handbags), **Sierra** vs. Patrick (Celebrity Siblings), **James** vs. Neesh (Reality TV Winners), Rebeckah vs. **Isabel** (Internet Slang), Isabel vs. **Sierra** (Disney Live-Action), Ngozi vs. **Kelcie** (Greek Life), Edie vs. **Paige** (Pageants); Episode/Prize winner: Sierra (32 spaces)
57	11	"The Ice King Melts"	June 10, 2026	FLR-511	N/A	TBA
Episode 11 Results: Duels played (9): **Paige** vs. Dan (Plumbing), **Paige (Time Boost)** vs. Sierra (Robots), Jim vs. **Mark** (Biopics), **Mark** vs. Paige (Yacht Rock), **Mark (Time Boost)** vs. Carolyn (Golf), Michael vs. **Mark** (National Parks Postcards), Liz vs. **Mark** (Celebrity Santas), **Mark** vs. Kim (Legendary Lines), Mark vs. **Sean** (Cocktails); Episode/Prize winner: Sean (76 spaces)
58	12	"The Fight to The Final"	June 10, 2026	FLR-512	N/A	TBA
Episode 12 Results: Duels played (9): Sean vs. **Kelcie** (Wine Tasting), Kelcie vs. **Kayleigh** (Barbershop), Kayleigh vs. **Victor** (World Religions), **Victor** vs. Eric (Eco-Friendly Living), Victor vs. **Erin** (Cruise Destinations), **James** vs. Erin (Disney Muppets), James vs. **Lauren** (Country Flags: James, Soap Operas: Lauren, Glassware: Lauren; final result: 1–2); Season winner: Lauren

=== Season 6 (2026) ===
Winners of individual duels are shown in boldface shown as Challenger (randomized or choosing to play on)/Defender (chosen by Challenger). Advantages earned are shown in Italics (the specific advantage is in parentheses). Advantages used are shown in Underline. The season is subtitled the Season of Champions.

No. overall	No. in season	Title	Original release date	Prod. code	U.S. viewers (millions)	Rating/share (18–49)
59	1	"100 Champions Enter the Ring"	September 13, 2026	FLR-601	N/A	TBA
Duels played (8): James vs. **Jena** (Mini Golf), Geneviéve vs. **Fatima** (Peanuts Gang), **Fatima** vs. Jena (K-Pop Artists), Riley vs. **Dr. Tre** (...Ologies), Brad vs. **Sabrina** (Measurements), **Shawn** vs. Fatima (Sesame Street), **Ethan** vs. Jake (Home Improvement), Ethan vs. **Wellington** (Borrowed Words); Episode/Prize winner: Shawn (5 spaces)
60	2	"The $20,000 Advantage"	September 30, 2026	FLR-602	2.59	0.23/3
Duels played (8): Bella vs. **Elizabeth** (Preschool), Savana vs. **Shamir** (Muscles), Shamir vs. **Henry** (Jumping), **Henry** vs. James (Action Sports), **Guenther** vs. Dr. Tre (Laundry), **Guenther** vs. Paige (Christmas Ornaments), **Guenther (Power Shot)** vs. Wellington (Aprés-Ski), Craig vs. **Travis** (Compost); Episode/Prize winner: Guenther (7 spaces)
61	3	"In the Crosshairs"	October 7, 2026	FLR-603	N/A	TBA
Duels played (9): **Frankie** vs. Scott (Y2K Stars), Matt vs. **Adrian** (Protein), Adrian vs. **Tailour** (DMV), Tailour vs. **Shawn** (Famous Vehicles), Lari vs. **Morgan** (Hasbro Games), Gabi vs. **Eddie** (Animal Calls), **Eddie** vs. Shawn (The Lincoln Era), **Moumita** vs. Elizabeth (Perfumes), Hannah vs. **Avery** (Ballet); Episode/Prize winner: Eddie (10 spaces)
62	4	"The Quiet Achiever"	October 14, 2026	FLR-604	N/A	TBA
Duels played (8): Avery vs. **Denise** (Out of Business), Denise vs. **Sydney** (Heated Rivalries), Audrey vs. **Melanie** (Bakery), Melanie vs. **Dustin** (Weaponry), Dustin vs. **Tyler** (Vacation Destinations), **Tyler** vs. Eddie (Strength), Tyler vs. **Catalina** (State Fair), Michael vs. **Blake** (Field Trips); Episode/Prize winner: Catalina (15 spaces)
63	5	"A Gamble for Glory"	October 21, 2026	FLR-605	N/A	TBA
Duels played (8): **Blake** vs. Maeve (Souvenirs), Blake vs. **Dan** (Guinness World Records), **Jonathan** vs. Catalina (Athleisure), **Meredith** vs. Sam (Zombies), Valerie vs. **Colin** (Physical Education), Amber vs. **Mike** (Retirement Hobbies), **Fred** vs. Jonathan (Trades), AnnMarie vs. **Michelle** (Eating Competitions); Episode/Prize winner: Fred (17 spaces)
64	6	"Everything the Floor Touches, Simba"	November 4, 2026	FLR-606	TBD	TBA
Duels played (9): Xavier vs. **Guenther** (Shipwrecks), **Guenther** vs. Ariel (Bedroom Items), **Guenther (Category Steal)** vs. Miles (Hotels), **Guenther** vs. Ashley (Italian Cuisine), Ivan vs. **Allie** (Pigs), **Jason** vs. E.G. (Famous Babies), Rashaad vs. **Travis** (Safety Gear), **Eric** vs. Jaii (Facial Hair), Troy vs. **Krystle** (The Lion King); Episode/Prize winner: Fred (17 spaces)
65	7	"A Giant Emerges"	November 11, 2026	FLR-607	TBD	TBA
Duels played (8): Krystle vs. **Caitlin** (Birthday Parties), Jaleen vs. **Jason** (Southern Cookin'), **Laila** vs. Mikayla (Racing Events), Katie vs. **Deborah** (Female Olympians), Merideth vs. **Adam** (Wine Making), **Adam** vs. Michelle (MTV Shows), Adam vs. **Malachi** (NBA & WNBA Logos), **Nelson** vs. Callie (Album of the Year); Episode/Prize winner: Fred (17 spaces)
66	8	"Bold Moves, Big Rewards"	November 18, 2026	FLR-608	TBD	TBA
Duels played (9): **Nelson** vs. Fred (Famous Scammers), **Nelson (Power Shot)** vs. Colin (Needle Crafting), Victor vs. **Guenther** (Photography), **Jessica** vs. Ashley (Art History), **Jessabelle** vs. Henry (State Animals), LeVreese vs. **Nelson** (Area Codes), Carole vs. **Morgan** (Estate Sale), James vs. **Nelson** (Nickelodeon Shows), **Nelson** vs. Guenther (International Cities); Episode/Prize winner: Nelson (35 spaces)
67	9	"The Second Coming"	November 26, 2026	FLR-609	TBD	TBA
Duels played (TBA): Episode/Prize winner: (TBA)

=== Special ===
Title	Original release date	Prod. code	U.S. viewers (millions)	Rating (18–49)
"The Floor Sneak Peek"	December 25, 2023	FLR-100	6.35	1.50/12

== Reception ==
=== Ratings ===
Season 3's post-Super Bowl LIX premiere of The Floor delivered 14 million total viewers, and is the season's No. 1 entertainment series telecast for ages 18–49. The Floor is the first game show to ever rank as a season's No. 1 entertainment series telecast among adults 18–49.

Viewership and ratings per season of The Floor
Season	Timeslot (ET)	Episodes	First aired		Last aired		TV season	Viewership rank	Avg. viewers (millions)	18–49 rank	Avg. 18–49 rating
Season	Timeslot (ET)	Episodes	Date	Viewers (millions)	Date	Viewers (millions)	TV season	Viewership rank	Avg. viewers (millions)	18–49 rank	Avg. 18–49 rating
1	Tuesday 9:00 p.m.	10	January 2, 2024	2.56	February 27, 2024	2.33	2023–24	67	3.52	35	0.58
2	Wednesday 9:00 p.m.	12	September 25, 2024	2.23	December 18, 2024	2.53	2024–25	TBD	TBD	TBD	TBD
3	Wednesday 9:00 p.m.	12	February 9, 2025	13.97	April 23, 2025	2.63	2024–25	TBD	TBD	TBD	TBD
4	Wednesday 8:00 p.m.	12	September 24, 2025	2.12	December 17, 2025	2.41	2025–26	TBD	TBD	TBD	TBD
