= Dan Dunn (painter) =

American painter

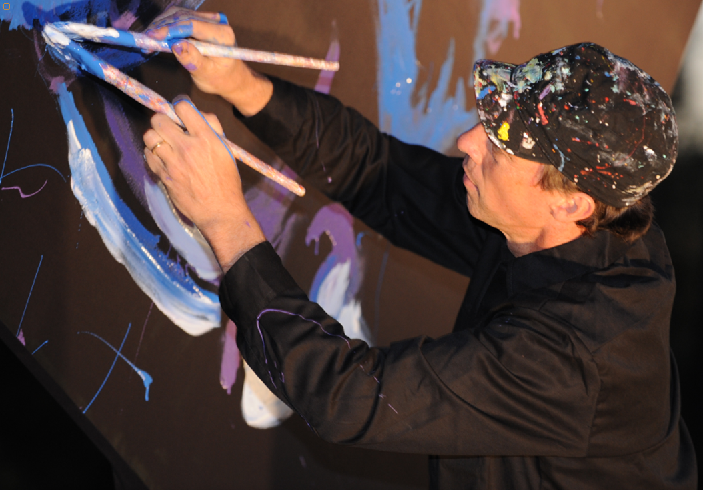
- Born: 1957 (age 68–69)
- Education: Sam Houston State University
- Known for: Speed painting
- Website: paintjam.com

Dan Dunn (born 1957) is an American improvisational speed painter and the creator of Paintjam, a theatrical performance art show in which paintings are created in minutes on stage.

== Biography ==
Studying painting at Sam Houston State University in Huntsville, Texas, Dunn specialized in oil painting and watercolor, also doing sculpture and life drawing. While a student, he started drawing caricatures at Six Flags, Astroworld in 1977 as a college student; he continued through nine seasons.

Dunn worked in advertising and graphic design but left that field to devote himself to caricatures full-time in 1989 when he launched a caricature artist talent agency, Caricatures Ink. His numerous caricatures include George H. W. Bush, Sting, Jimmy Buffett, Joe Theisman, Fran Tarkenton, Ray Childress, Warren Moon and Houston Mayor Bob Lanier.

== Paintjam ==
Dunn was inspired to create Paintjam, his live improvisational Speed painting performance, by the Speed Painter Denny Dent, who died at the age of 55 in the prime of his career. Deep in debt, Dunn was looking for a way to meet his family's growing needs. He had success as part of an Atlantic City stage show, and his daughter posted video from the show on YouTube, where it received millions of hits.

Dunn has appeared on The Ellen DeGeneres Show Last Call with Carson Daly and Late Night with Jimmy Fallon. He has performed all over the world painting such people as Richard Branson, Turkish Prime Minister Recep Tayyip Erdoğan, Sheikh Zayed in Abu Dhabi and Natalie Cole. He has opened or appeared with Shaquille O'Neal, Bill Cosby, Fergie, Chris Angel, Elvis Costello, Lionel Richie, Natalie Cole, Taylor Hicks, Taylor Swift, the Plain White T's, Maroon 5, Queen Latifah, Mike Rowe, Craig Ferguson and Carolyn Rhea.

Dunn lives in Houston with his wife Cindy and five children.
