= Jessica K. Haas =

American Speed Painter

Jessica K. Haas is an American speed painter, performance artist, and speaker. She is known for creating large-scale paintings live in front of audiences, often completing works in under two minutes. Haas gained wider attention after winning the Miss Tennessee title with a speed-painting talent performance and later appearing on ABC's The Gong Show.

== Early life ==
Haas was born and raised in Texas. In a 2025 profile in People, she described growing up in poverty with her mother and grandmother, including periods of homelessness. She became interested in art as a child and later developed speed drawing and speed painting as a performance talent.

== Pageants and speed painting ==
Haas first developed speed painting through pageant competition. According to People, she trained by drawing portraits against a stopwatch and later used speed painting as her talent in pageants.

In 2013, Haas won Miss Tennessee with a speed-painting performance in which she painted a portrait upside down before revealing the completed image. Her pageant performances helped popularize speed painting within pageant talent competitions; People reported that New York Magazine described her as “the mother of the pageant speed-painting movement.”

== Career ==
After winning Miss Tennessee, Haas began receiving national performance opportunities, including an appearance on ABC's The Gong Show. She has performed live speed-painting acts at sporting events and entertainment venues, including events connected to the NFL, NBA, MLB, NHL, NCAA, and the Indianapolis 500.

Haas has also appeared on television programs and news segments demonstrating her work. In 2023, she appeared on Fox Carolina to demonstrate speed painting ahead of an Art in Motion event in Greenville, South Carolina. In 2025, she appeared on Fox & Friends in a segment about her career as a speed painter.

In 2019, automotive publication Autoevolution covered Haas creating a live painting of the Koenigsegg Agera Thor, a rare hypercar, at a private event.

== Public image and style ==
Haas's performances combine visual art, music, movement, and live reveal moments. Her work has often been described in connection with sports entertainment, pageantry, and live event performance.
