= Eugeniusz Geno Malkowski =

Artist and painter (1942–2016)

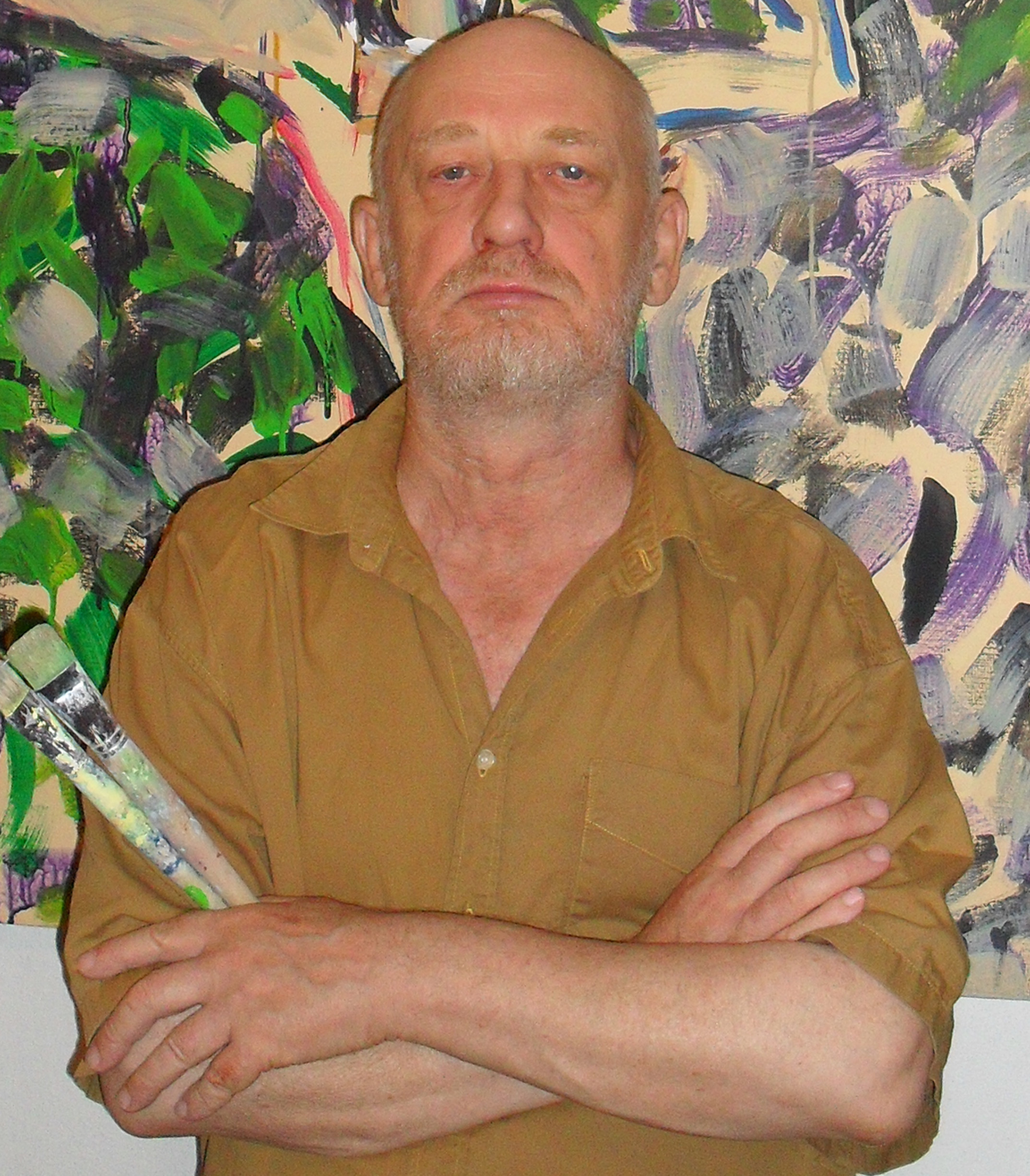
- Born: 5 September 1942; Gdynia, Poland
- Died: 20 August 2016 (aged 73); Zamość, Poland
- Education: Juliusz Studnicki; Artur Nacht-Samborski
- Known for: Painting
- Movement: Lyrical abstraction; abstract expressionism
- Awards: Silver Cross of Merit (1986) Decoration for Merit to Polish Culture (2011)

Eugeniusz Geno Małkowski (Polish pronunciation: [ɛuˈɡɛɲuʂ ˈɡɛnɔ mauˈkɔfski]; 5 September 1942 – 20 August 2016) was a Polish painter. Małkowski was a professor of contemporary art at the University of Warmia and Mazury in Olsztyn, founder of artistic groups and associations throughout Poland, organizer of modern art exhibitions, and popularizer of art. He was known for his speed painting happenings in which he invited people to paint together. In 2005, in Bełchatów, he beat the Guinness World Record for the 24-hour-long-painting performance.

== Biography ==
He was born in Gdynia. After World War II, his family moved to Lębork where he spent his childhood. He started artistic education in 1957 at Graphical Secondary School in Wrocław and continued studying at Academy of Fine Arts in Warsaw with the professors Juliusz Studnicki and Artur Nacht-Samborski. In 1969 he founded the artistic group Arka and in 1972 he transformed it into a bigger generational movement (80 creators) known by the name O Poprawę (For the Enhancement) with which he organized 9 group expositions. In the 1980s he co-founded the multidisciplinary art group Świat (World) and organized 18 group expositions. In the 1990s he passed several years in France where he founded the artistic association ARA (Association for Renovation of Art) and organized several group exhibitions of modern Polish art.

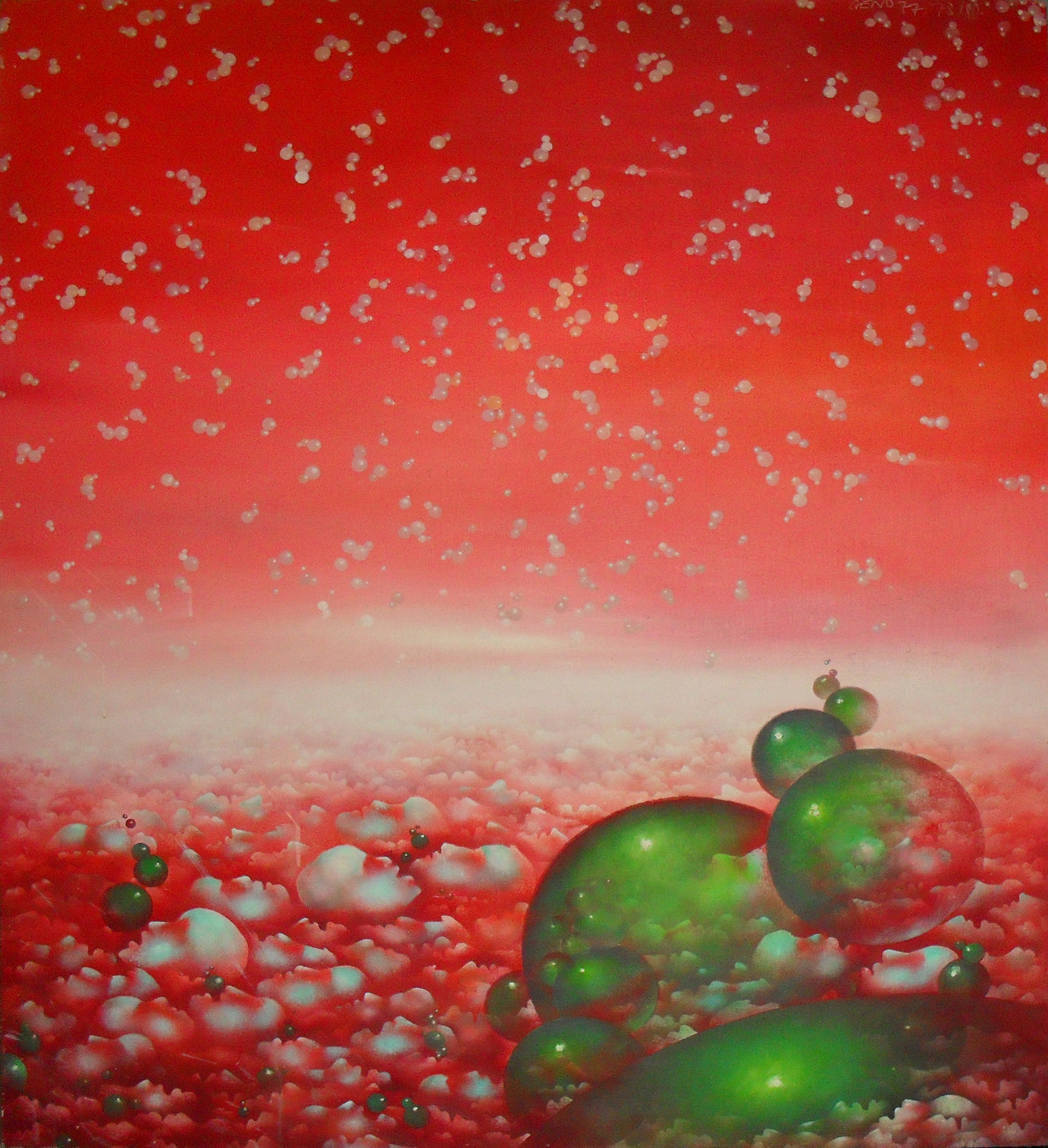
Our Times, from the cycle "The Big World", 1971

Between 1991 and 2012 worked as a Professor of Art at University of Warmia and Mazury in Olsztyn. Since 1990 he organized many happenings popularizing modern art among non specialized public. He practiced speed and time painting and invited spectators to paint with him at informal places, such as commercial centers or streets. The works created in such a way were later exhibited in art galleries. In 2005 in Bełchatów he beat the Guinness World Record for the 24-hour-long-painting. He painted 100 works measuring 80 cm x 100 cm based on previously performed sketches. He lived and worked in Warsaw and in Olsztyn. He has had more than 50 solo shows of his works and he has participated in over 200 group exhibitions. His paintings are held by major museums of Poland (i.a. National Museum in Warsaw, National Museum in Gdańsk, Toruń Regional Museum), as well as by private collectors in Poland and all around the world.

Małkowski died in hospital in Zamość, Poland on 20 August 2016.

== Work and style ==
At the beginning of his career he reinvented graffiti technique applying it with stencil brushes on canvas, in a method known as tapping. In his early paintings he was depicting fantastical and heavenly backgrounds populated with stenciled human profiles, transparent spheres or outlined hands. Later he added some other irregular forms tending towards the lyrical abstraction. The names of his works were metaphorically commenting his reality (cycles: "Wielki Świat" (The Big World), "Krzyk" (Shout) and "Exodus").

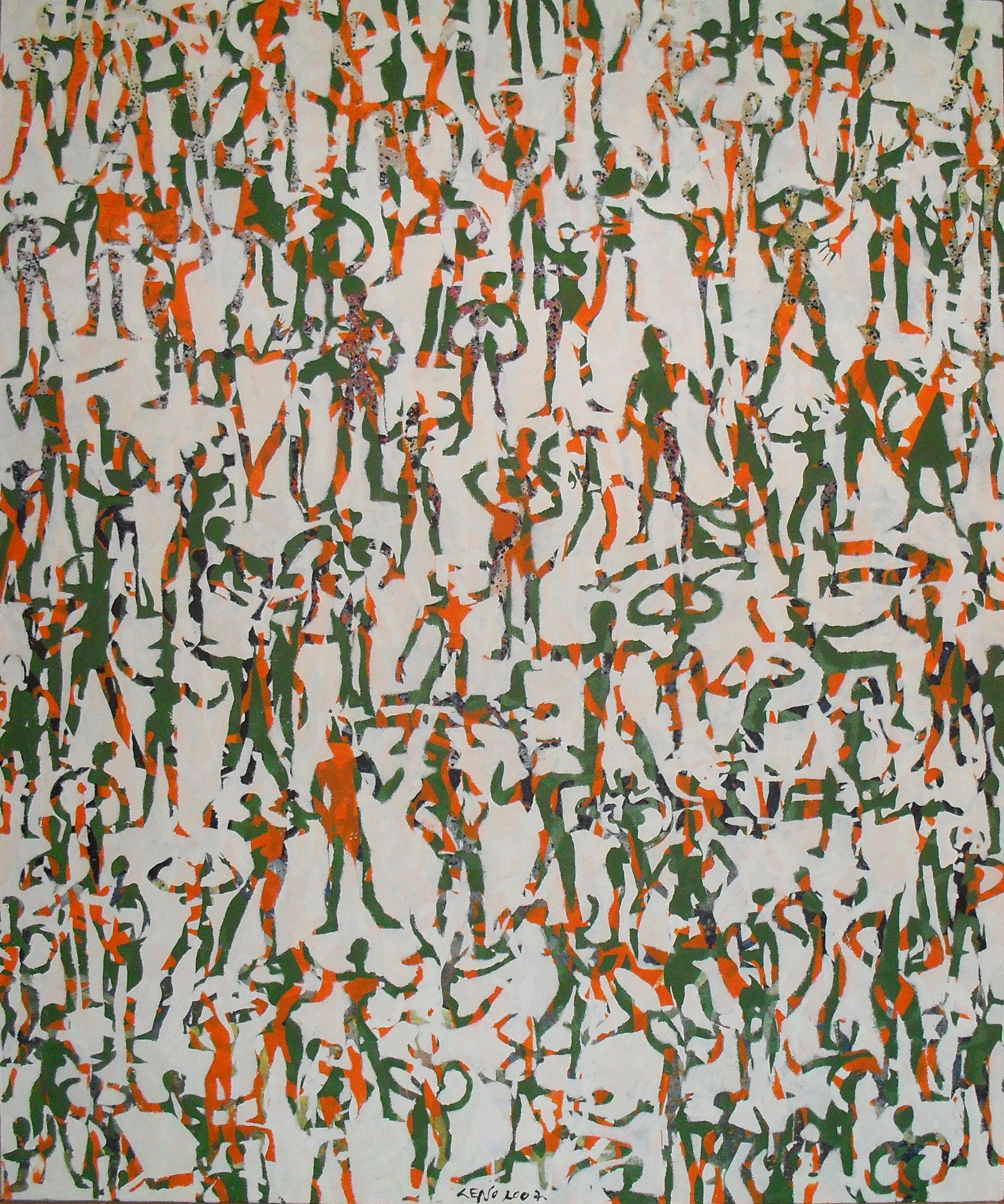
Where am I?, from the cycle "Generations", 2007

In the 1980s he introduced figurative elements and started experimenting with space division of art work (cycle "Obszary" (Territories)). Furthermore, he implemented collage techniques mixing them up with graffiti (cycle "Współcześni" (Contemporaries)). In the 1990s he abandoned tapping replacing it with so-called speed painting techniques. He became closer to the basis of abstract expressionism reproducing persons or situations in a spontaneous, automatic and almost subconscious way. In the first decade of the 21st century he moved back to the graffiti technique superposing multicolor stencils of human shapes on monochromatic background (cycle "Pokolenia" (Generations)). In 2010 in Olsztyn he exhibited a series of 44 female nudes painted in several short sessions mixing up speed painting and realistic techniques. The last nude was painted by the artist in public exhibition during the opening day.

== Awards ==
- 1974 Bronze Medal Award, 5th Festival of Arts, Zachęta, Warsaw
- 1975 3rd Award, Art Competition: Człowiek-plastyka na zamówienie społeczne w XXX-lecia PRL, Zachęta, Warsaw
- 1983 1st Award, Kosmos - Materia Exhibition, Elbląg
- 1984 Award, Best Museum Event of the Year, Exhibition: Niebo widziane z ziemi, Toruń Regional Museum
- 1985 Jan Cybis Prize
- 1986 Cross of Merit (Poland)
- 2010 Award, Personality of the Year, Institute of Arts, University of Warmia and Mazury in Olsztyn
- 2011 Decoration for Merit to Polish Culture
