= Speed painting =

Artistic technique with limited time

Speed painting is an artistic technique where the artist has a limited time to finish the work. The time can vary, usually a duration is set from several minutes to a few hours. Unlike sketches, speed paintings may be considered "finished" after the time limit is up.

Speed painting is particularly common among digital media artists, because digital painting mediums allow for a work to circumvent drying times of traditional media. Digital media artists primarily use speed painting to practice working quickly and efficiently. Speed painting techniques are also frequently used in concept art, particularly in the early stages of a production when the polish of an individual image matters less than a clear basic presentation of many candidate concepts for consideration.

Traditional media artists also use limited-time pieces as a challenge of skill, and an exercise in not over thinking their work.

Speedpainted pieces both digital and traditional are considered by artists to be an excellent exhibition of the subjective skill of a painter, as the time constraint requires efficient rendering of form and detail and a deep understanding of their chosen medium to capture a complete, strong image, and leaves little time for noticing and correcting mistakes.

== Examples ==
Speed painting with painting standing on its head in front of Centre Pompidou, Paris, France.

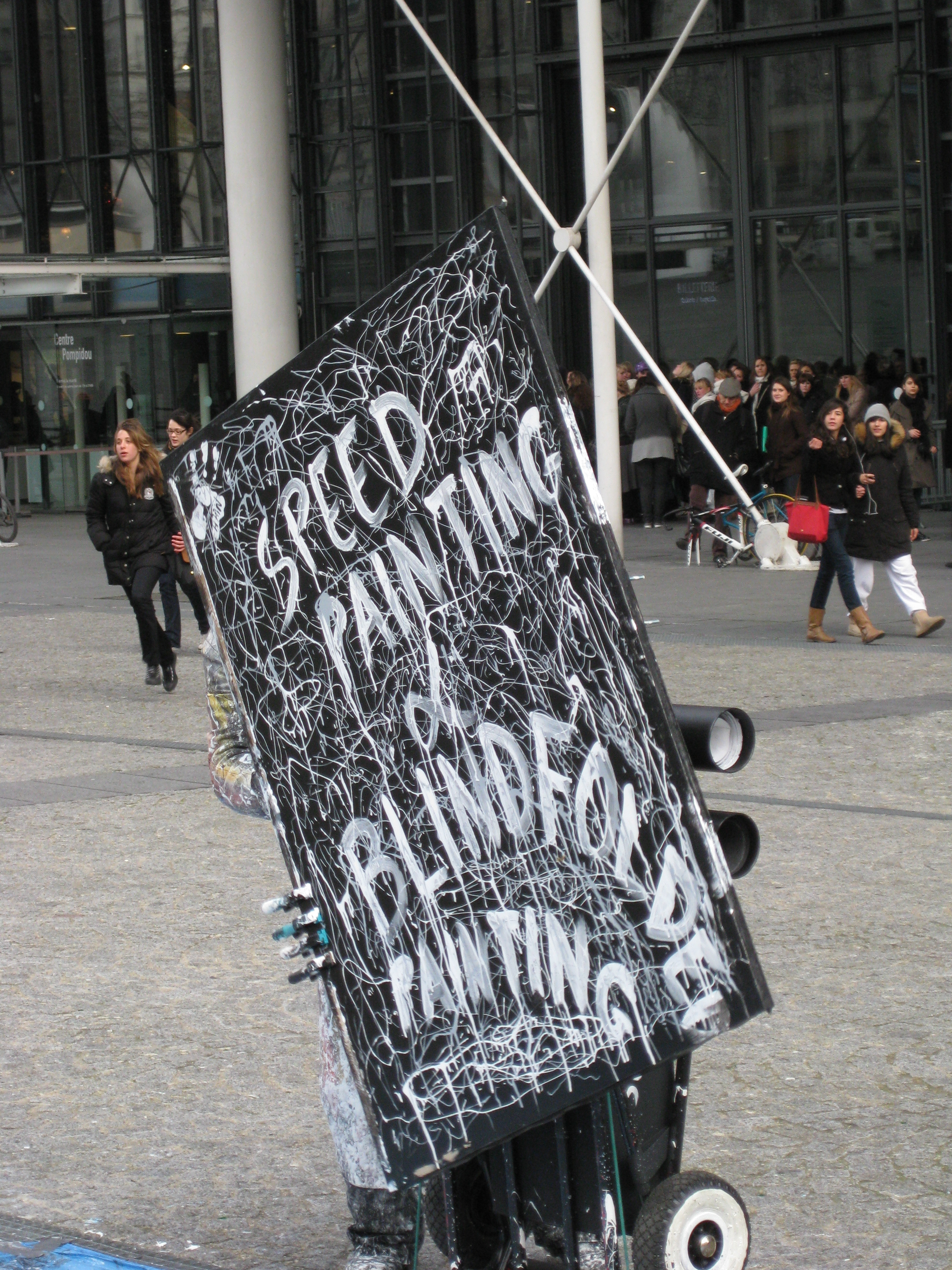
15:47:01

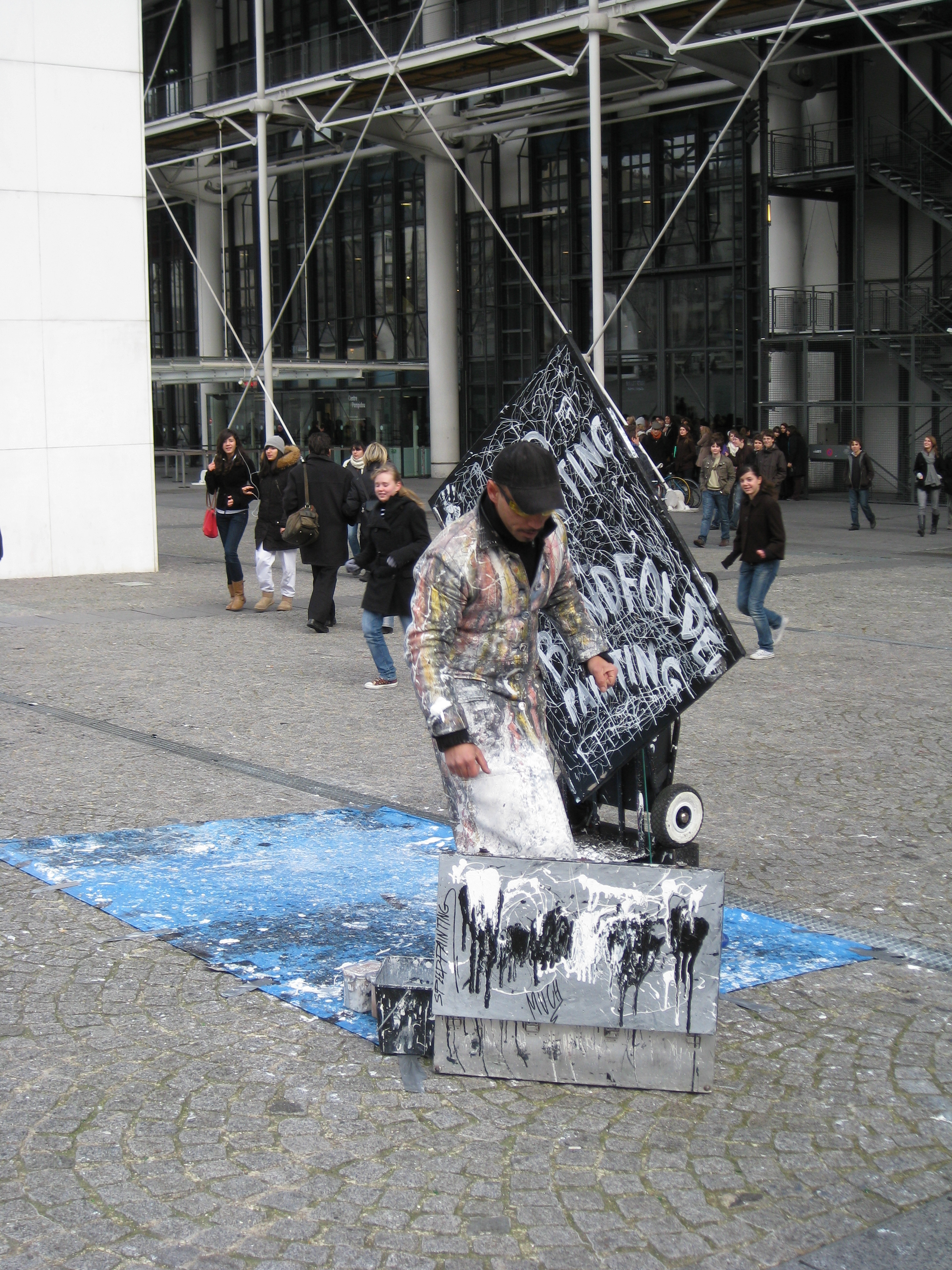
15:47:12

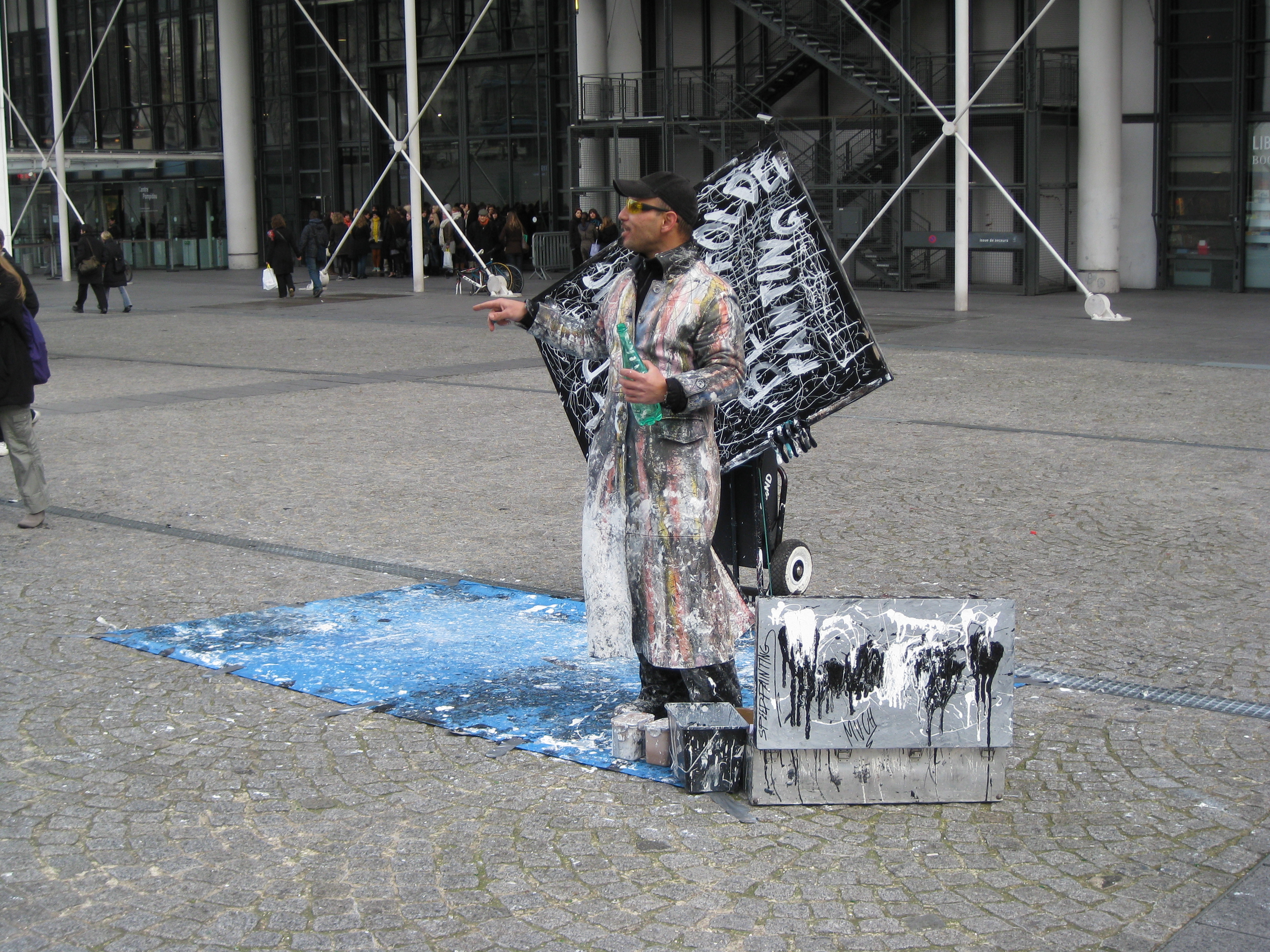
15:47:29

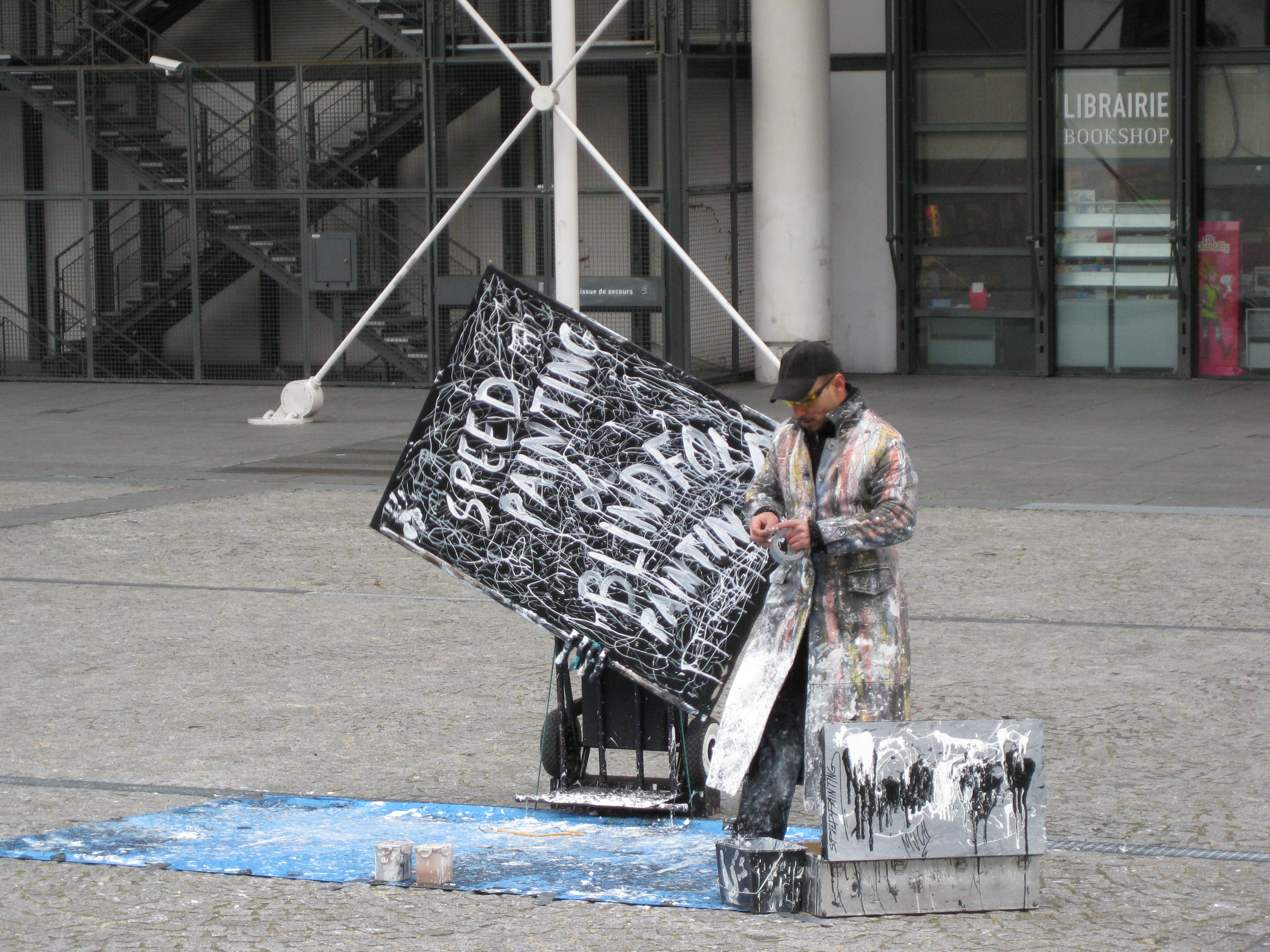
15:50:20

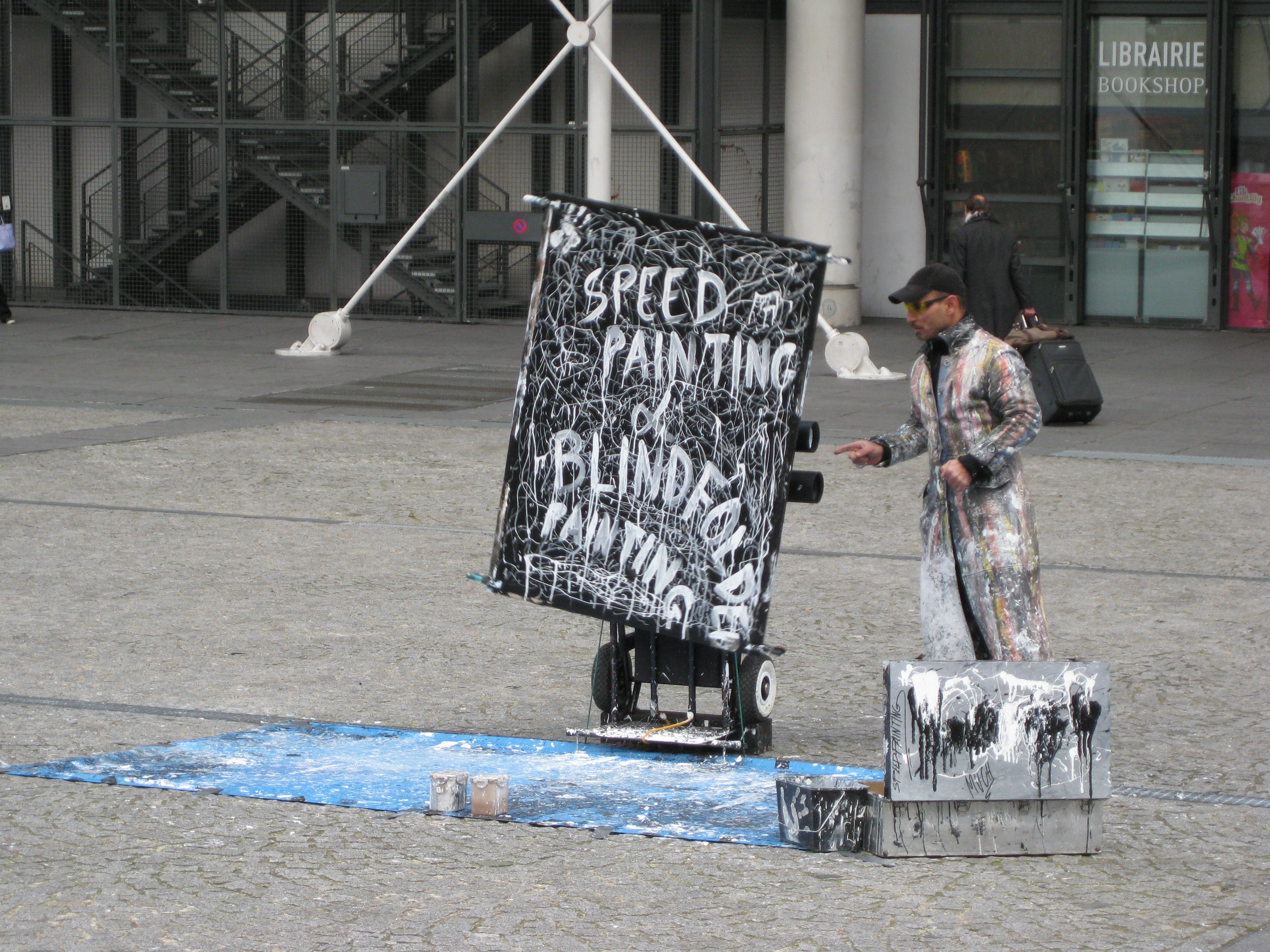
15:52:13

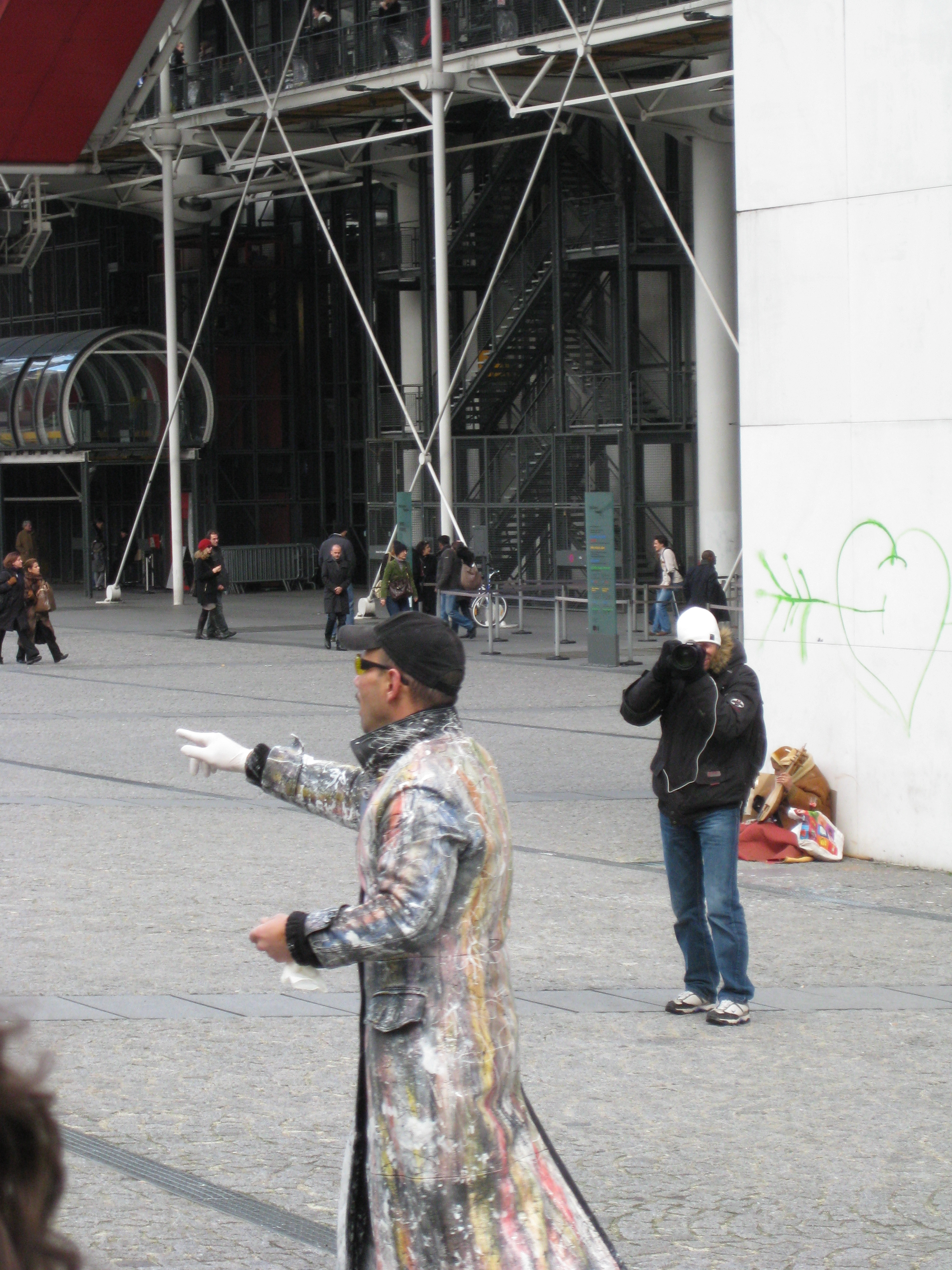
15:54:46

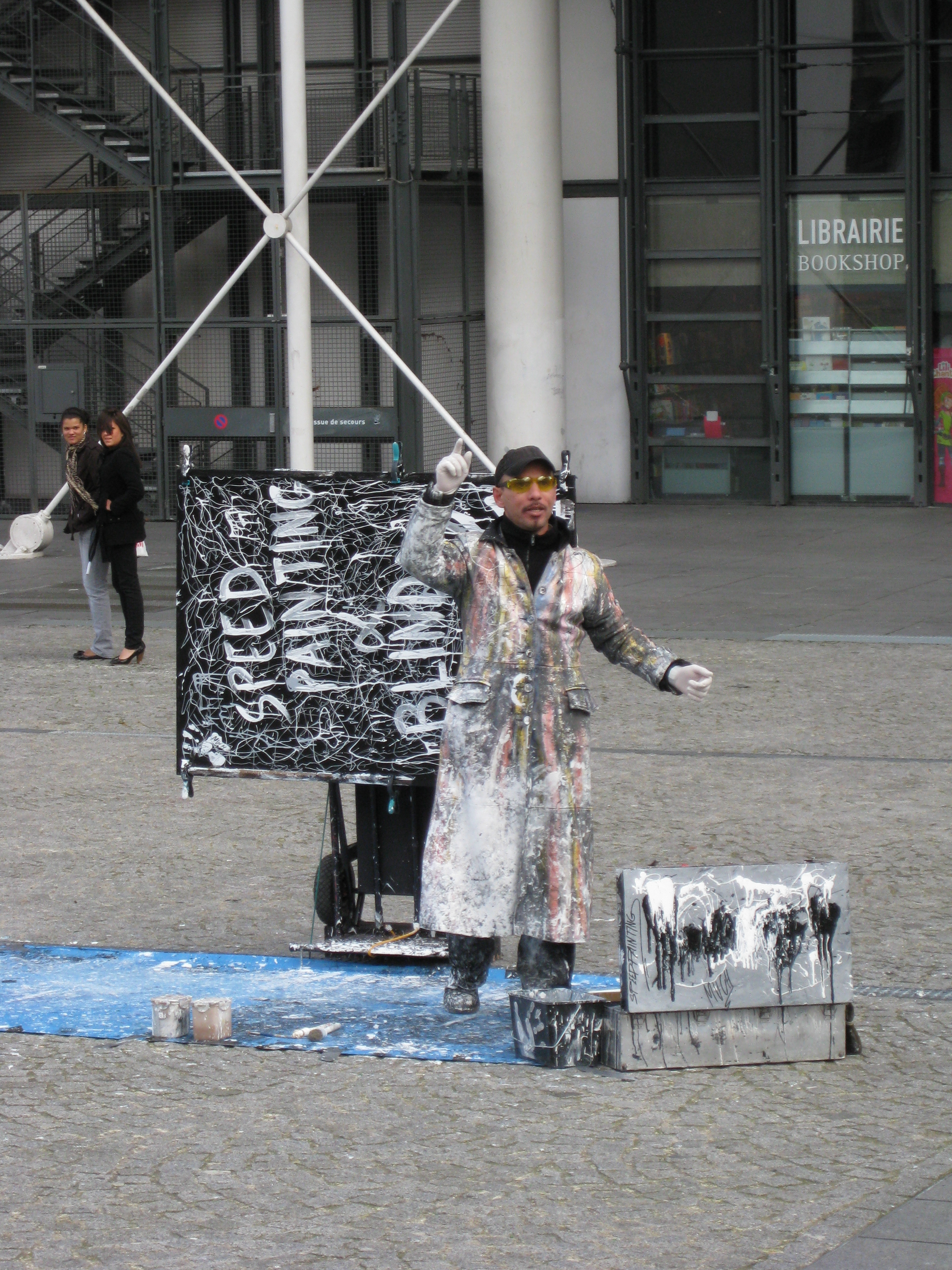
15:55:46

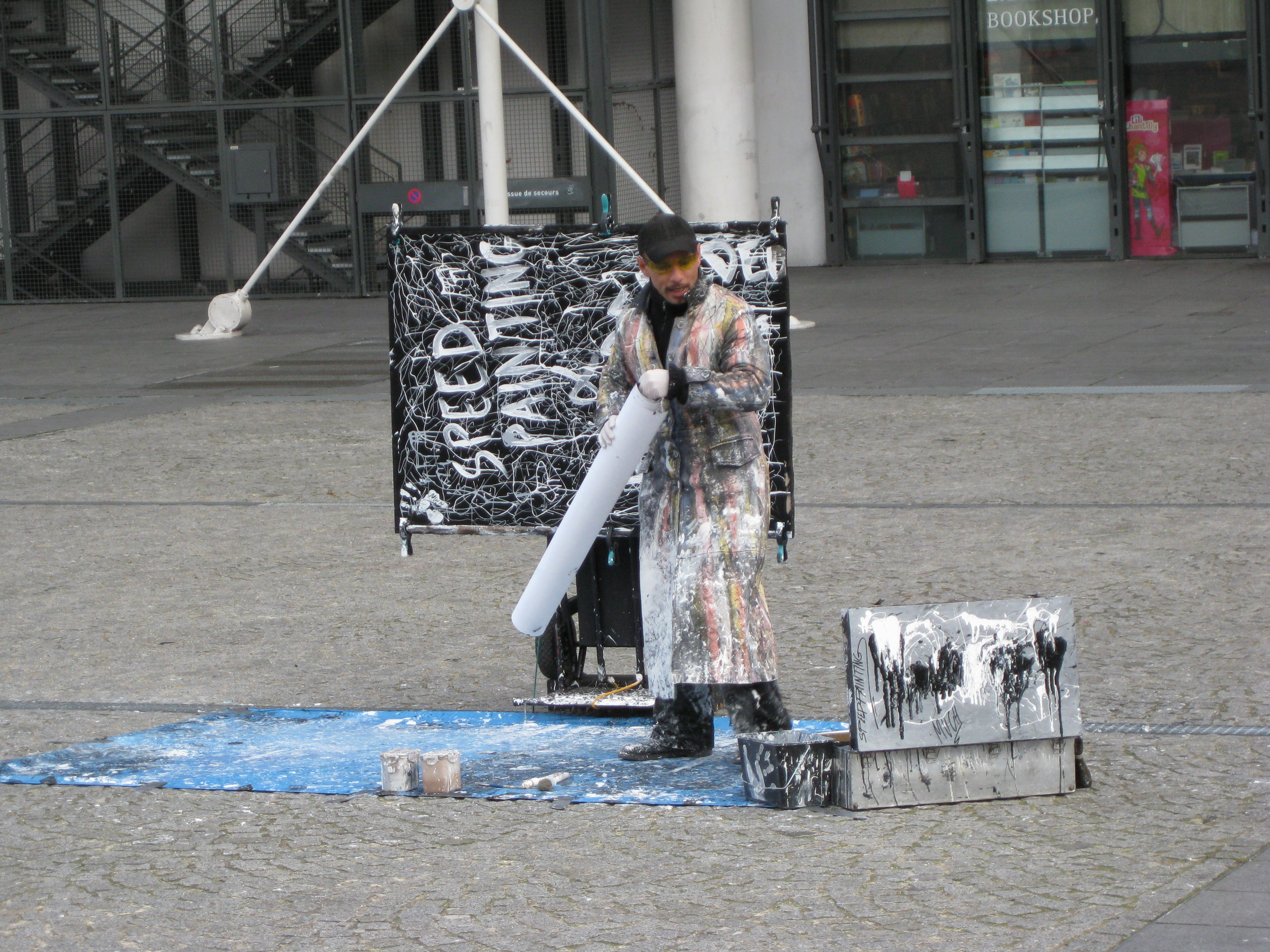
15:56:08

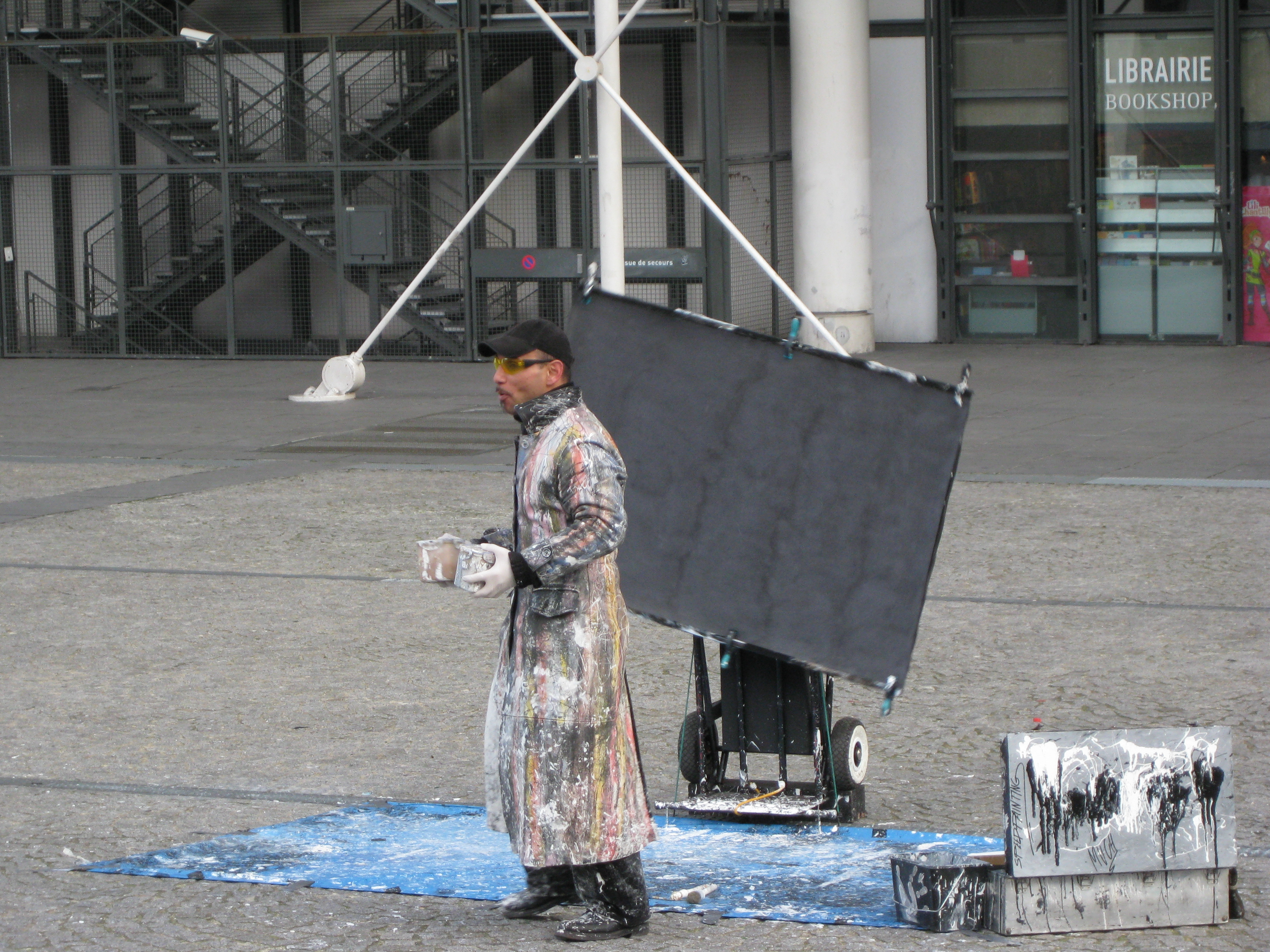
15:57:52

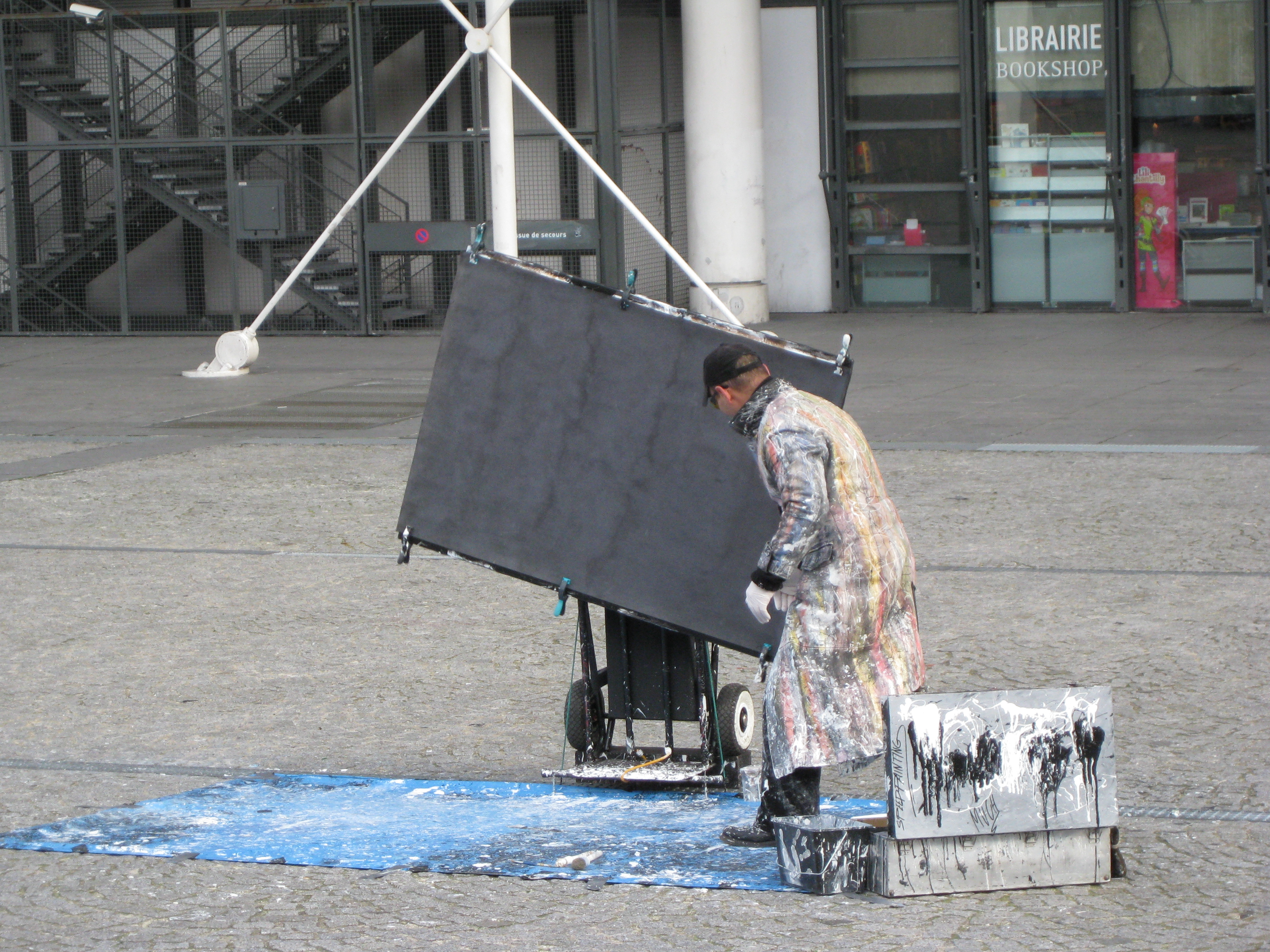
15:58:11

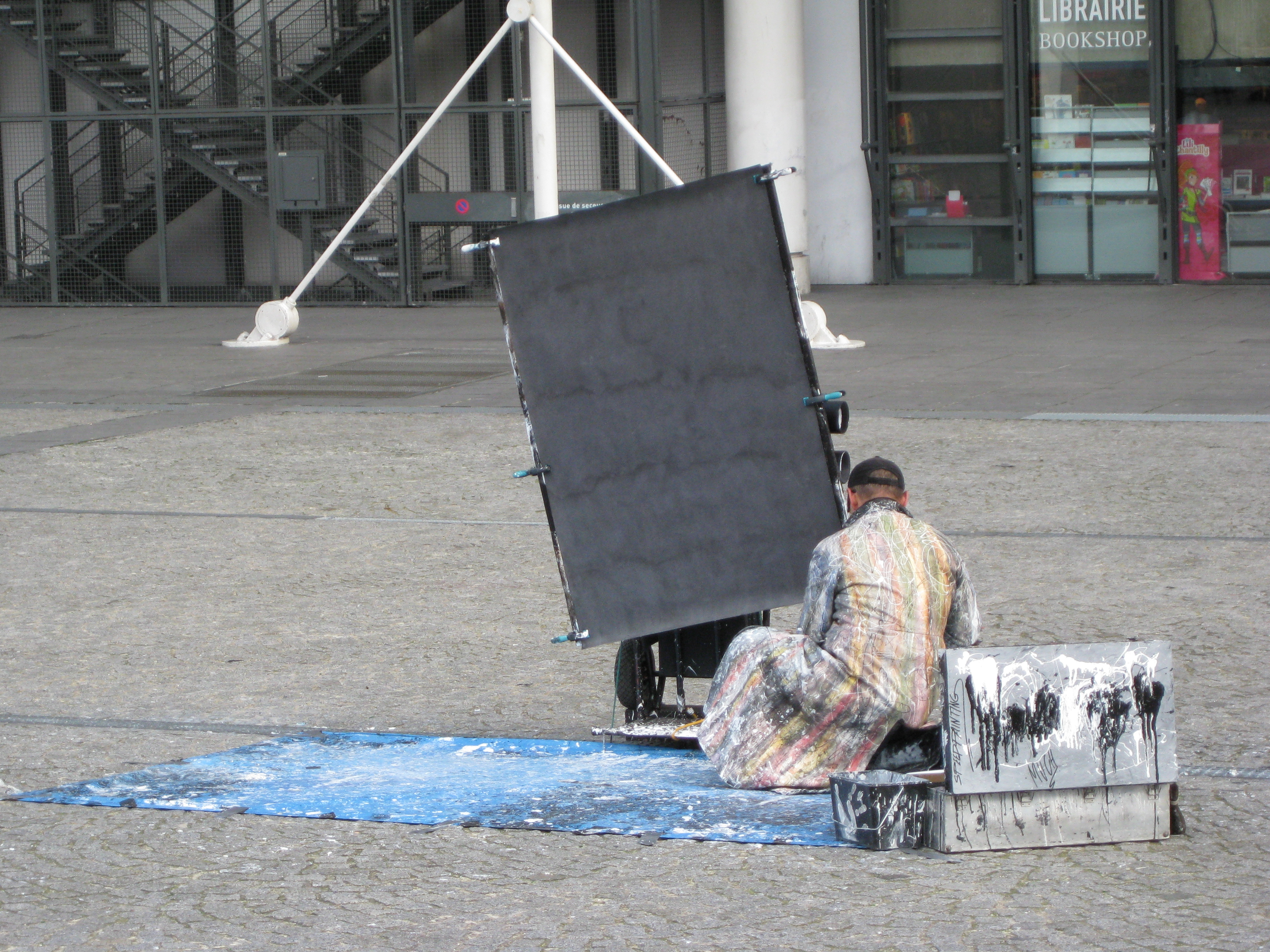
15:58:47

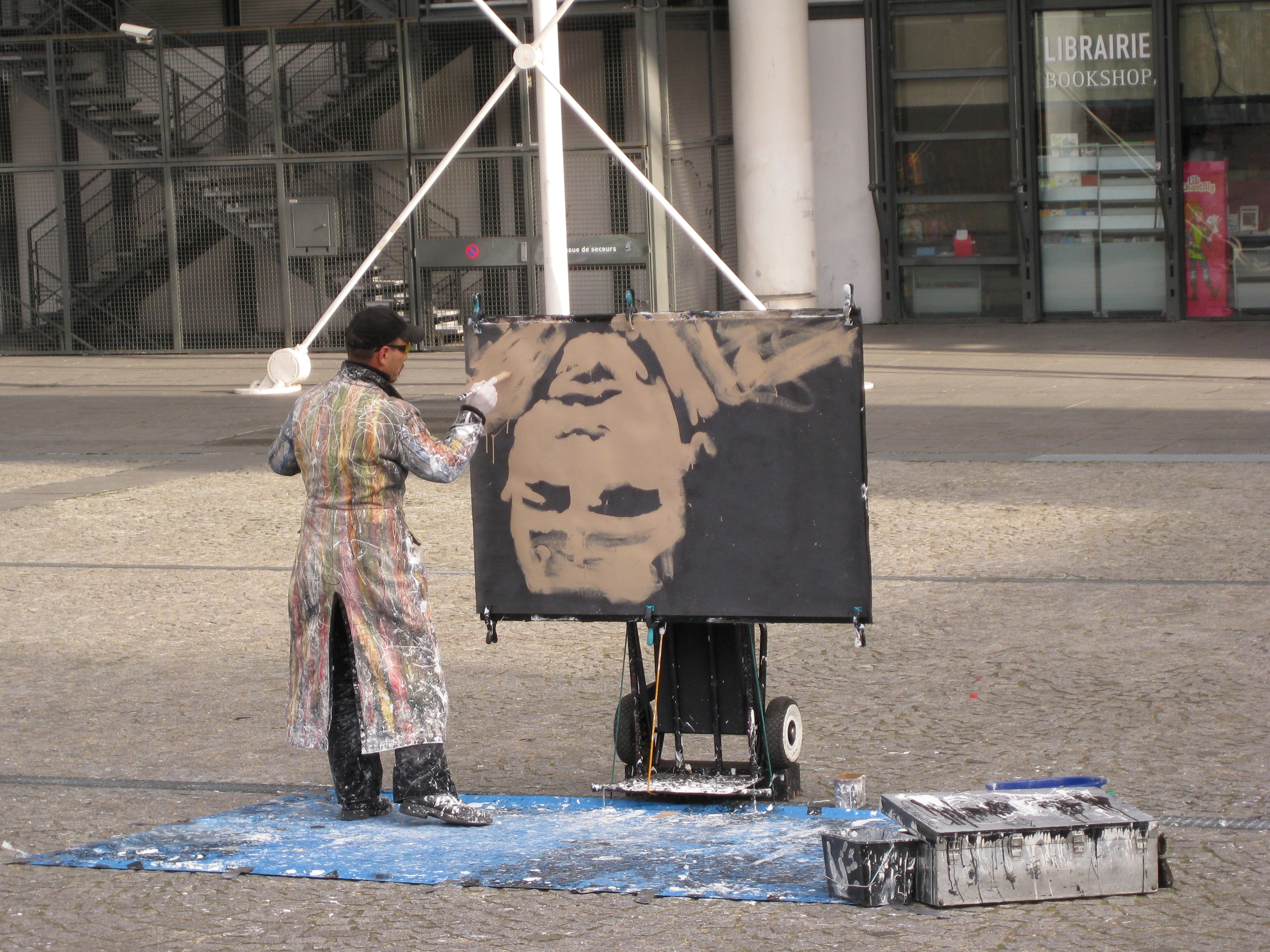
16:05:42

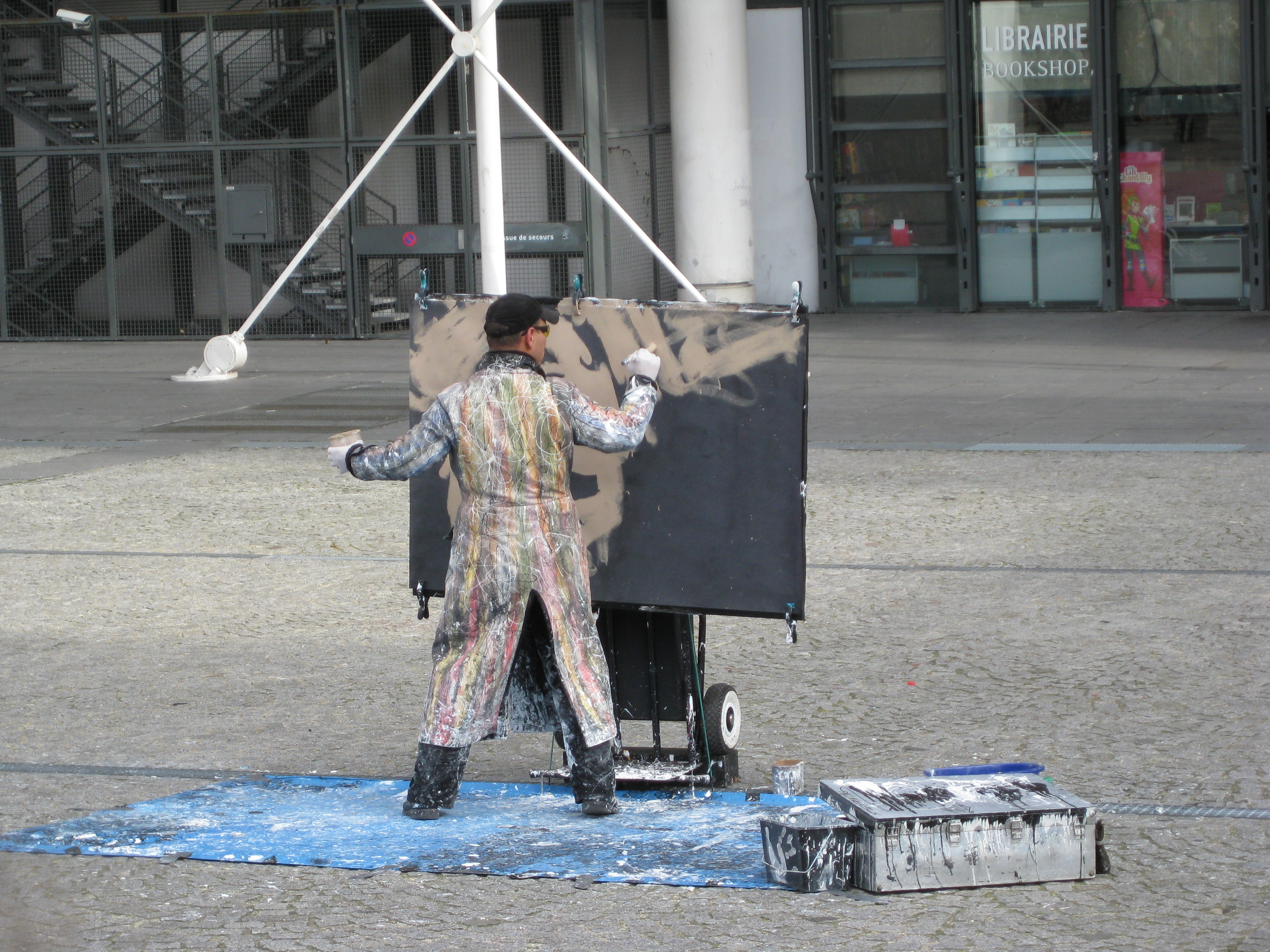
16:05:47

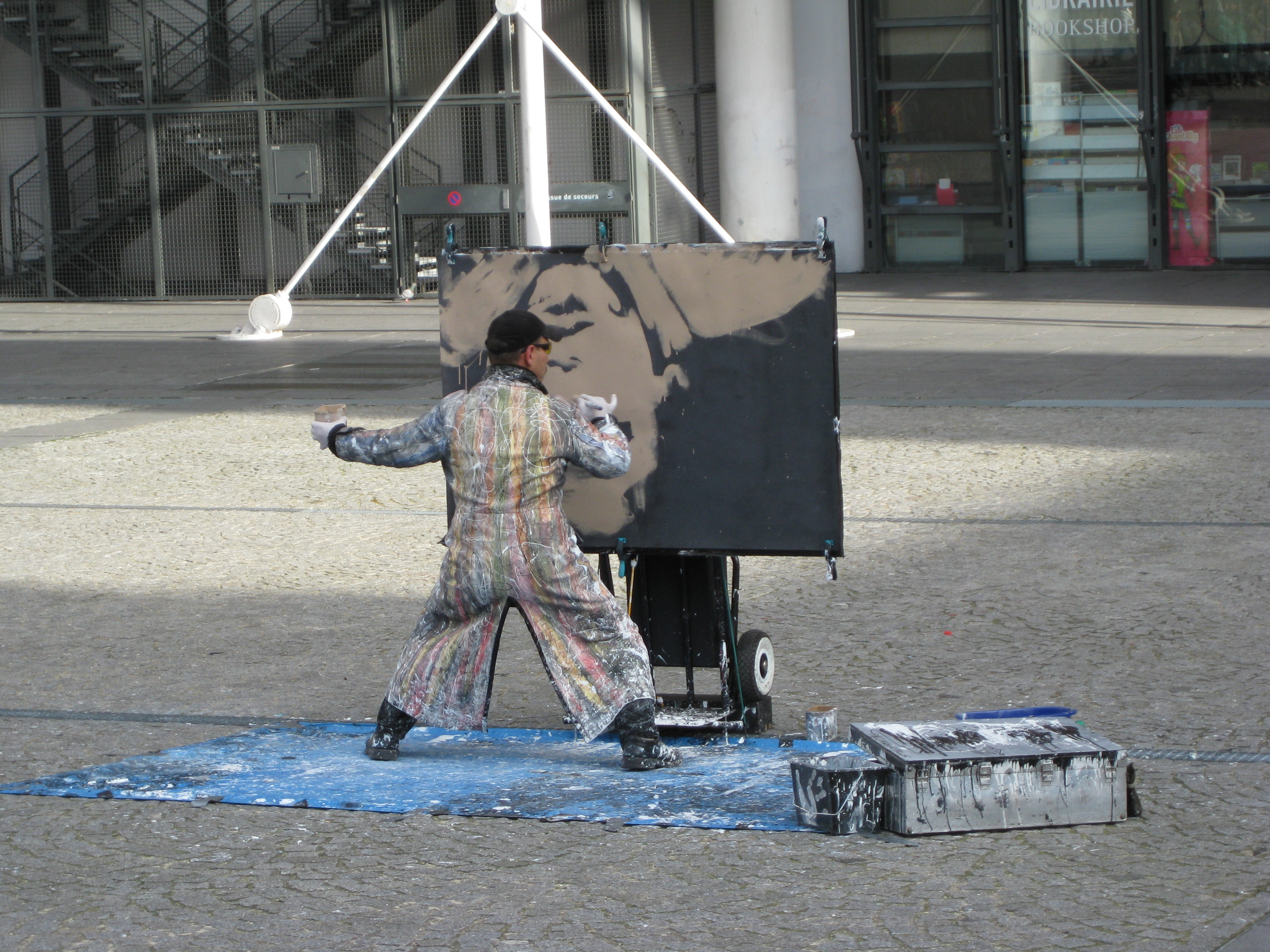
16:06:07

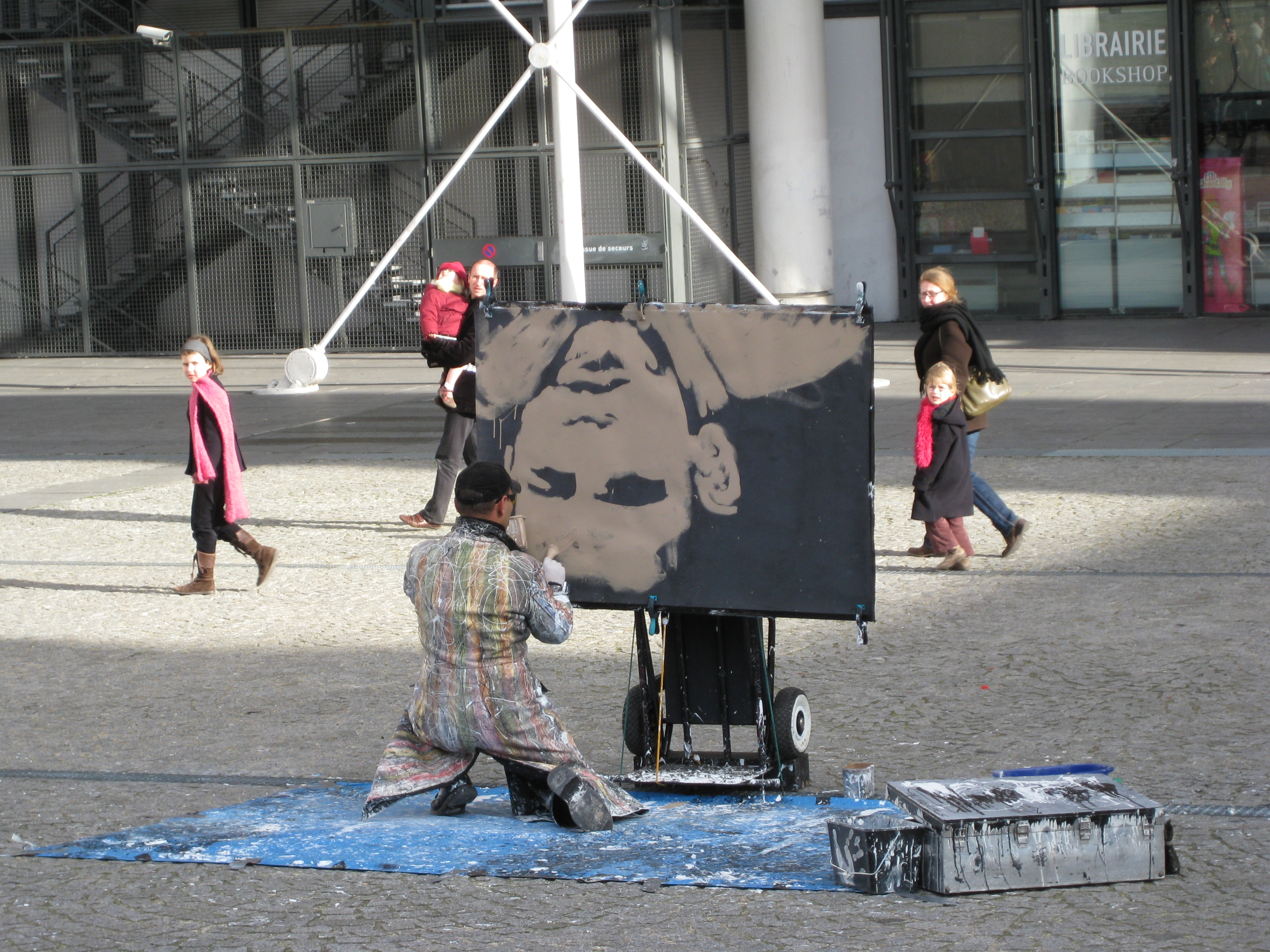
16:06:34

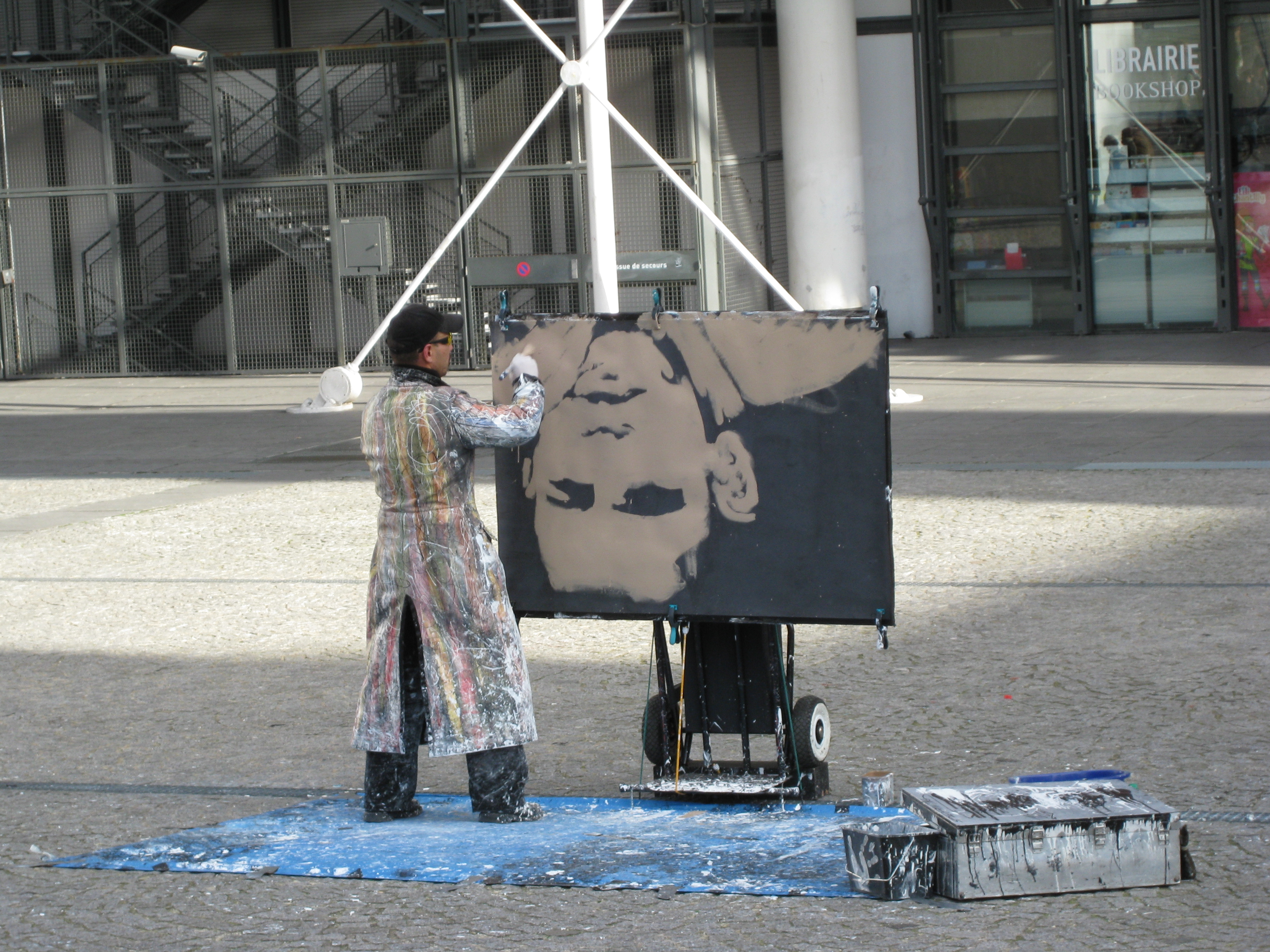
16:07:08

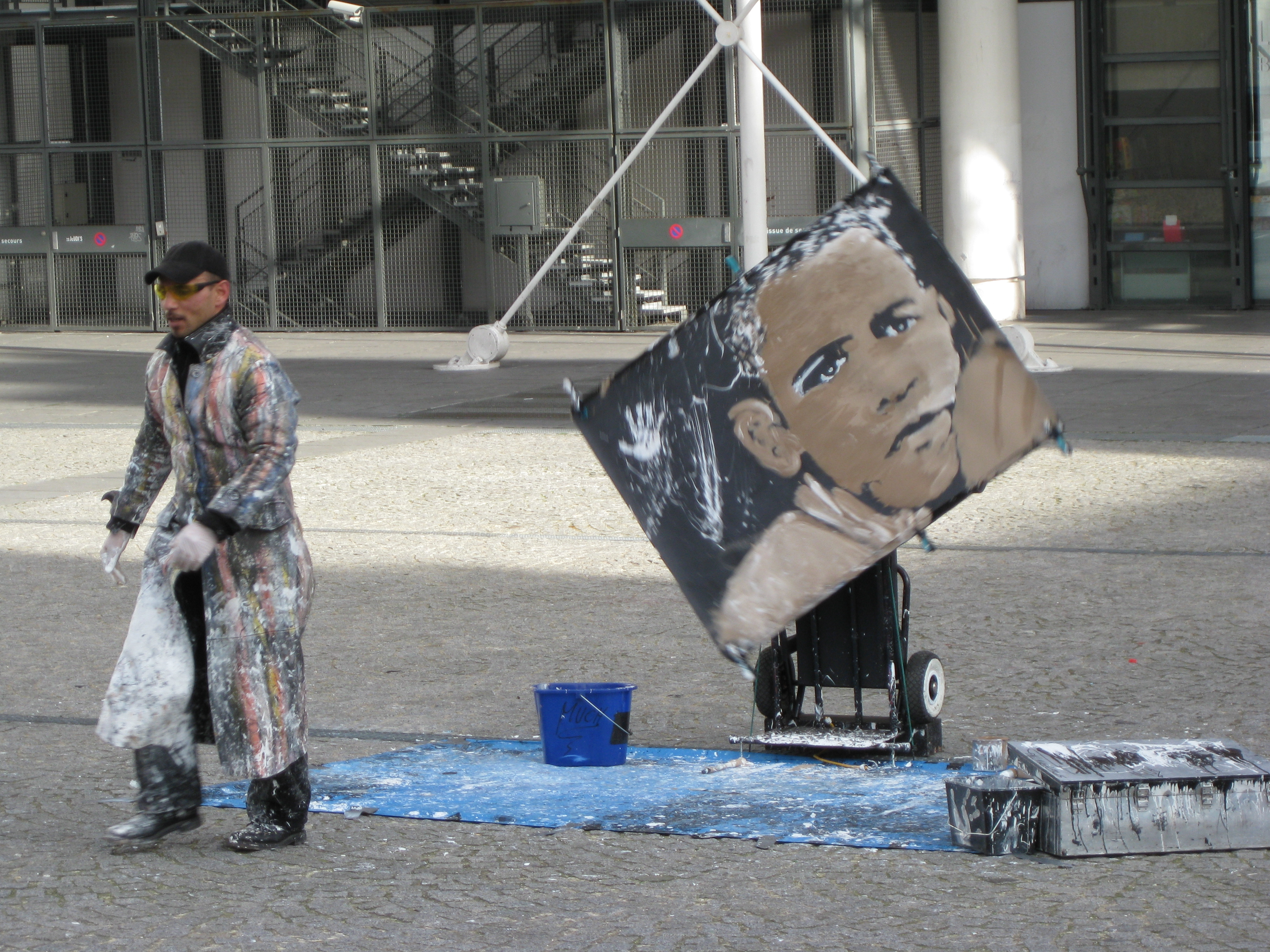
16:11:46

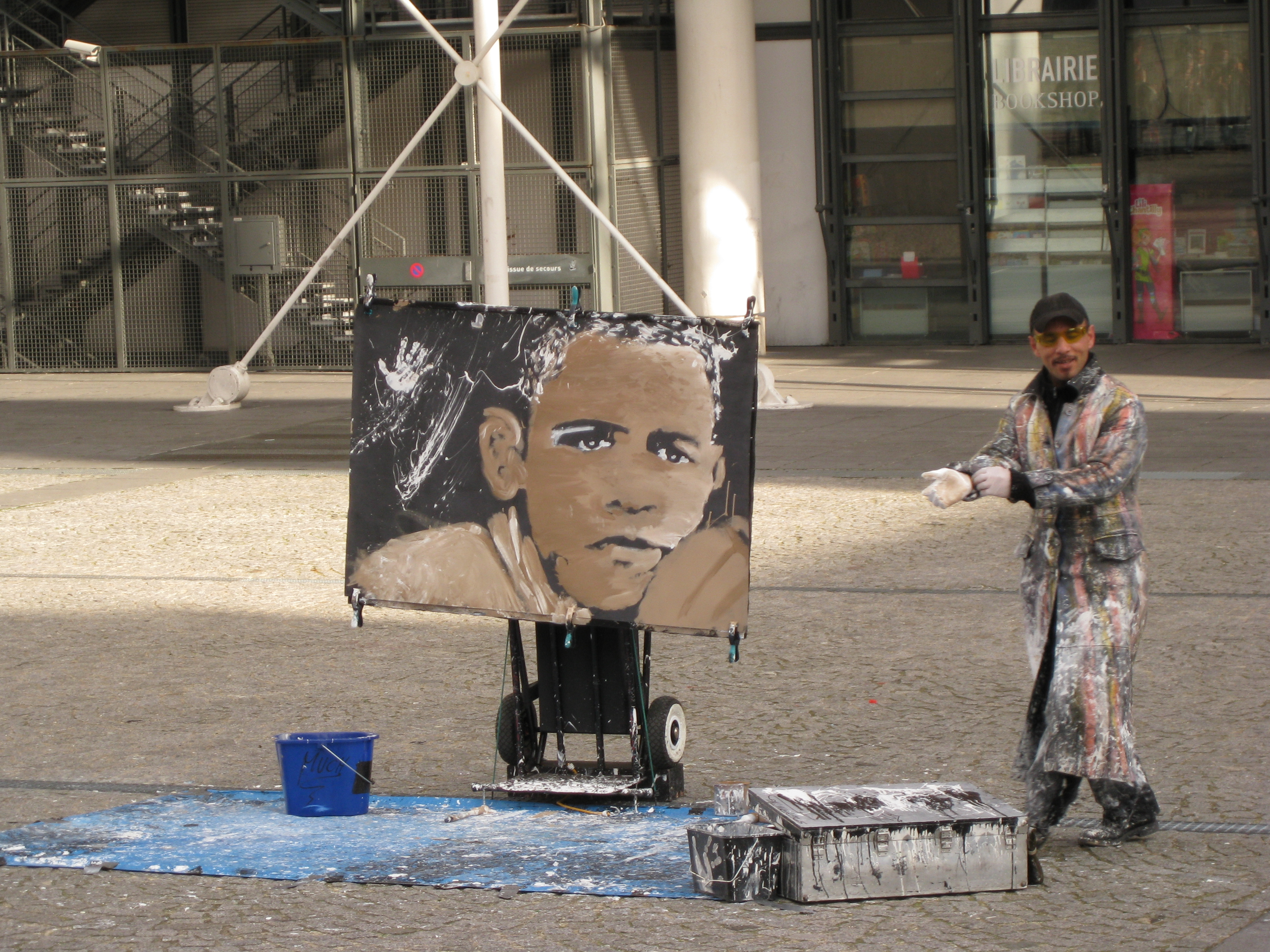
16:12:00

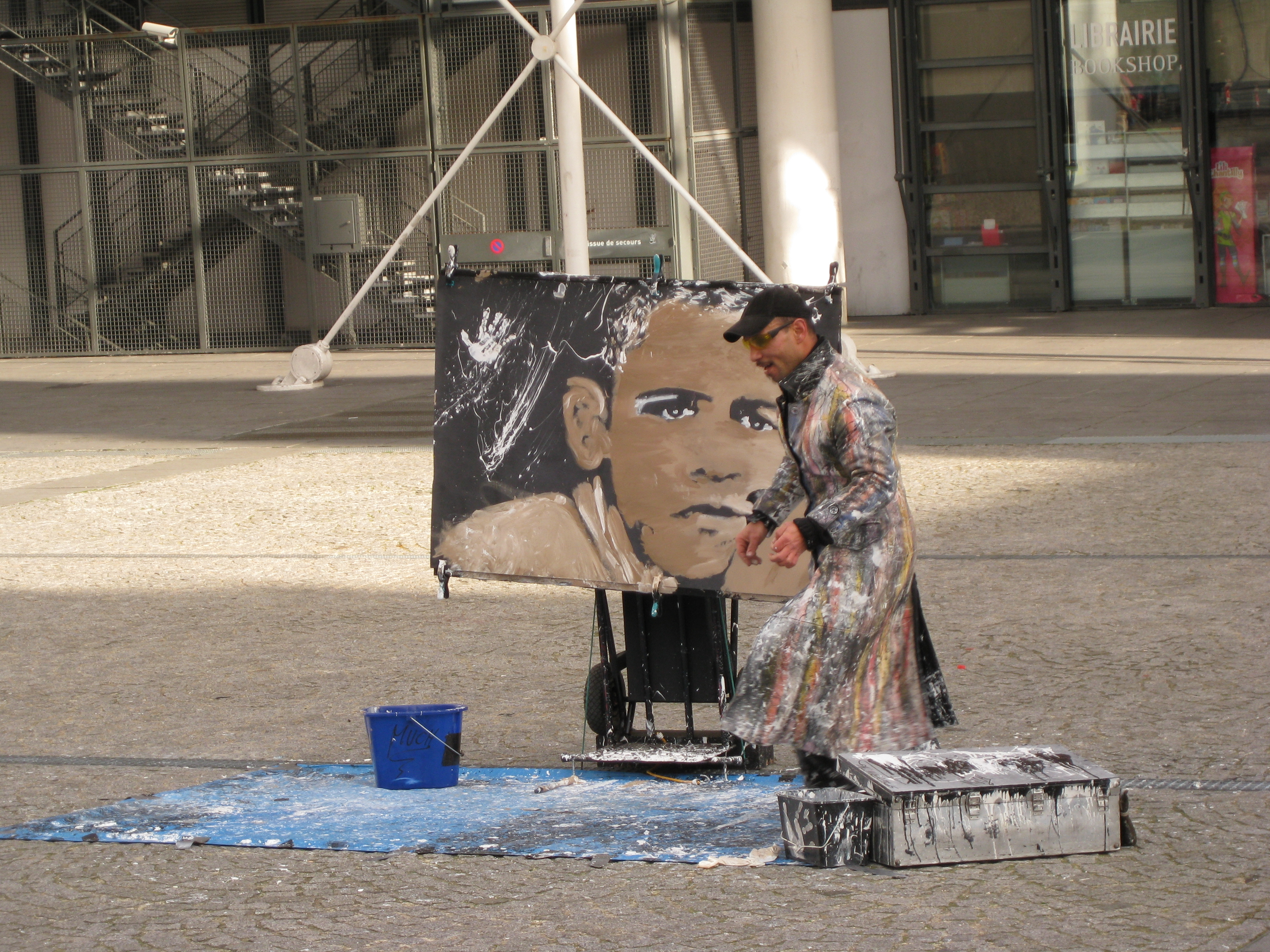
16:12:09

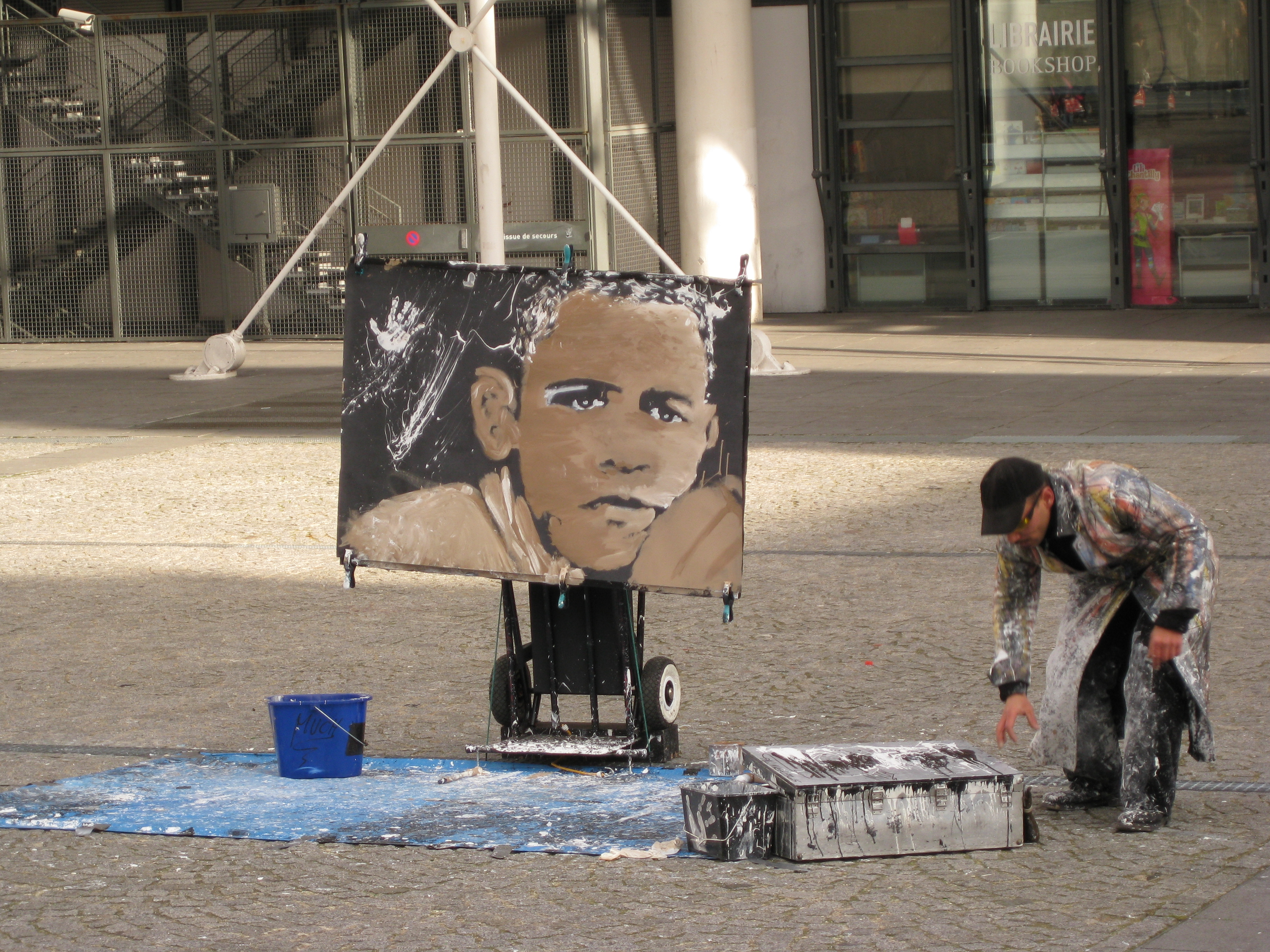
16:12:16

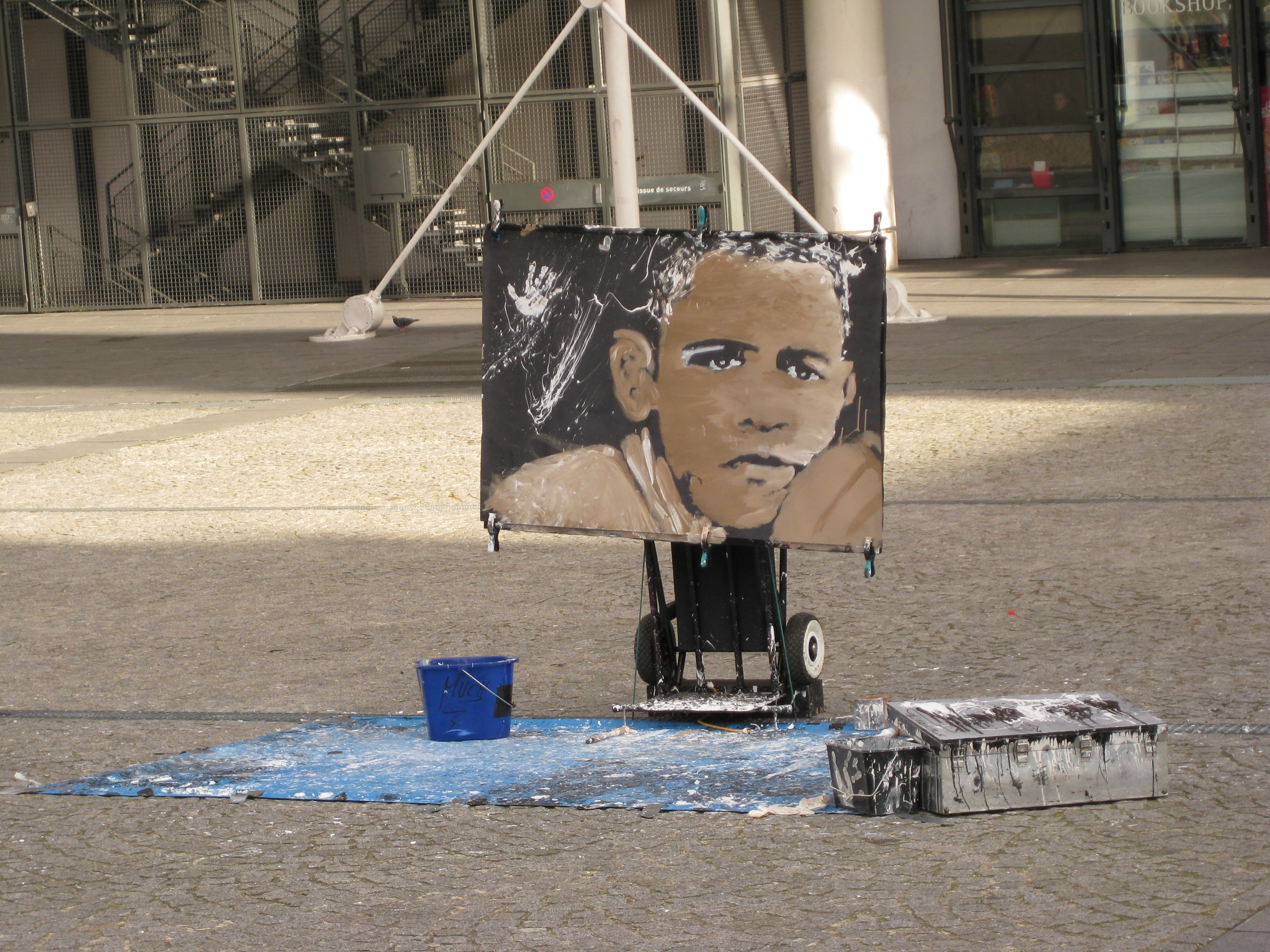
16:12:24
