= Gibson (surname) =

Origin
- Meaning: "son of Gib"
- Region of origin: Scotland, England

Other names
- Variant forms: Fitzgibbon, Gilbert

Gibson is an English and Scots language patronymic surname. In Ireland, Gibson may be an anglicized form of the Irish Gaelic Ó Gibealláin. It is derived from the medieval name Gilbert (derived from Giselbert or Gillebert), introduced to England and Ireland by the Normans and often shortened to "Gib". In this case the surname Gibson would mean "son of Gib".

It can be a sept of Clan Buchanan.

== Notable people with the surname ==
- Aaron Gibson (born 1977), American football player
- Adam Gibson (born 1986), Australian basketball player
- Adrian Gibson (1935–2015), Australian politician
- Ari Gibson (born 1983), Australian artist, animator and video game designer
- Alan Gibson (1923–1997), English sports journalist
- Alan Gibson (director) (1938–1987), Canadian film director
- Alan Gibson (bishop) (1856–1922), clergyman in South Africa
- Alec Gibson (born 1963), American football player
- Aleena Gibson (born 1968), Swedish songwriter
- Alex Gibson (disambiguation), multiple people
- Alexander Gibson (disambiguation), multiple people
- Alfred Gibson (died 1874), Australian explorer
- Althea Gibson (1927–2003), African-American tennis player
- Amy Gibson (born 1960), American actress and businesswoman
- Andrea Gibson (1975–2025), American poet
- Andrew Gibson (disambiguation), multiple people
- Anna Gibson (born 1999), American ski mountaineer
- Anne Gibson, Baroness Gibson of Market Rasen (1940–2018), British trade unionist
- Antonio Gibson (born 1998), American football running back
- Antonio Gibson (safety) (born 1962), American football safety
- Ashley Gibson (born 1986), English rugby league player
- Aubrey Gibson (1901–1973), Australian businessman and patron of the arts
- Ben Gibson (disambiguation), multiple people
- Bob Gibson (1935–2020), American baseball player
- Bob Gibson (disambiguation), multiple other people
- Brian Gibson (disambiguation), multiple people
- Bryan Gibson (born 1947), Canadian boxer
- Cade Gibson (born 1998), American baseball player
- Carleton B. Gibson (1863–1927), first President of the Rochester Institute of Technology
- Catherine Gibson (1931–2013), Scottish swimmer
- Charles Gibson (born 1943), American broadcast journalist
- Charles Gibson (disambiguation), multiple other people
- Chris Gibson (disambiguation), multiple people
- Clifford Gibson (1901–1963), American blues singer and guitarist
- Colin Gibson (disambiguation), multiple people
- Cody Gibson (born 1987), American American mixed martial artist
- Craig Gibson, American college baseball coach
- Daniel Gibson (born 1986), American professional basketball player
- Daniel Z. Gibson (1908–1984), American college President
- Darron Gibson (born 1987), Irish footballer
- Darryl Gibson (disambiguation), multiple people
- David Gibson (disambiguation), multiple people
- Debbie Gibson (Deborah Gibson; born 1970), American singer, Broadway performer
- Dennis Gibson (disambiguation), multiple people
- Diana Gibson (1915–1991), American actress
- Donald Gibson (disambiguation), or Don Gibson, multiple people
- Doug Gibson (disambiguation), multiple people
- Douglas Gibson (born 1943), Canadian editor, publisher and writer
- Douglas Gibson (politician) (1942–2025), South African lawyer, politician and diplomat
- Edmund Gibson (1669–1748), English divine and jurist
- Edward Gibson (disambiguation), multiple people
- Eleanor J. Gibson (1910–2002), American psychologist
- Ella Elvira Gibson (1821–1901), first woman chaplain in the US military
- Ella Gibson (born 2000), British archer
- Elspeth Gibson (born 1963), British fashion designer
- Ernest Gibson (disambiguation), multiple people
- Ervin Gibson (died 1983), American murder victim
- Eugenia Gibson (died 1945), American missionary and temperance leader
- Eunice Gibson (1895–1974), founder of the Barbados Nurses Association
- Frank Gibson (disambiguation), multiple people
- Frazette Gibson, Bahamian politician
- Fred Gibson (disambiguation), multiple people
- Gary Gibson (disambiguation), multiple people
- George Gibson (disambiguation), multiple people
- Ginny Gibson (1924–1998), vocalist and recording artist in New York in the 1950s
- Gordon Gibson (disambiguation), multiple people
- Graeme Gibson (1934–2019), Canadian novelist
- Greg Gibson (disambiguation), multiple people
- Guy Gibson (1918–1944), British aviator, commander of the 'Dambusters' squadron
- Henry Gibson (1935–2009), American actor
- Herbert Gibson (disambiguation), multiple people
- Hilda Gibson (1925–2013), member of the Women's Land Army during World War II
- Henry Gibson (disambiguation), multiple people
- Hoot Gibson (1892–1962), rodeo champion, pioneer cowboy film actor, film director, and producer
- Hugh Gibson (disambiguation), multiple people
- Hutton Gibson (1918–2020), father of actor Mel Gibson and a writer on religion
- Ian Gibson (disambiguation), multiple people
- James C. Gibson, Scottish military veteran, plantation manager, and community leader
- John Gibson (1933–2019), American art dealer, gallerist of John Gibson Gallery in New York City
- J. J. Gibson (1904–1979), American psychologist in the field of visual perception
- Jack Gibson (disambiguation), multiple people
- Jackie Gibson (disambiguation), multiple people
- James Gibson (disambiguation), multiple people
- Jean Gibson (1927–1991), English artist
- Jerrick Gibson, American football player
- Jill Gibson (born 1942), American singer and artist who sang briefly in The Mamas & the Papas
- John Gibson (disambiguation), multiple people
- Jon Gibson (disambiguation), multiple people
- Jonathan Gibson (disambiguation), multiple people
- Josh Gibson (1911–1947), Baseball Hall of Fame member and player in the Negro leagues
- Josh Gibson (footballer) (born 1984), Australian rules footballer
- Julie Gibson (1913–2019), American singer and actress
- Julie Ann Gibson, captain in the Royal Air Force
- Keith Gibson (footballer), New Zealand footballer
- Kelly Gibson (born 1964), American professional golfer
- Kelsie Gibson (born 1993), British rower
- Kenny Gibson (born 1961), Scottish politician
- Kenneth Gibson (disambiguation), multiple people
- Kirk Gibson (born 1957), American baseball player
- Kyle Gibson (disambiguation), multiple people
- Lacy Gibson (1936–2011), American Chicago blues guitarist, singer and songwriter
- Lawrence R. Gibson (1912–2004), American politician
- Leah Gibson (born 1985), Canadian actress
- Levi Withee Gibson (1872–1919), American politician
- Lewis Gibson (figure skater) (born 1994), Scottish figure skater
- Lorna Gibson, American materials scientist and engineer
- Mabel Gibson (1901–1951), Australian singer in musicals
- Manson Gibson, American kickboxer
- Margaret Gibson (disambiguation), multiple people
- Mark Thomas Gibson (born 1980), American artist
- Mel Gibson (born 1956), American-Australian film actor, director, and producer
- Michael Gibson (disambiguation), or Mike Gibson, multiple people
- Millie Gibson (born 2004), English actress
- Milo Gibson (born 1990), Australian actor, son of the actor Mel Gibson
- Miranda Gibson, Australian environmental activist and school teacher
- Neil Gibson (disambiguation), multiple people
- Orville Gibson (1856–1918), American luthier and founder of Gibson Guitar Corporation
- Pandora Gibson, Bahamian comedian and storyteller
- Pat Gibson (born 1961), Irish quiz player
- Patrick Gibson (disambiguation), multiple people
- Paul Gibson (disambiguation), multiple people
- Rachel Gibson (disambiguation), multiple people
- Ralph Gibson (born 1939), American awarded photographer
- Ralph Gibson (fighter pilot) (1924–2009), American flying ace
- Sir Ralph Gibson (judge) (1922–2003), British judge
- Ralph Gibson (political activist) (1906–1989), Australian political organiser and writer
- Randall L. Gibson (1832–1892), U.S. Congressman and Senator from Louisiana
- Richard Gibson (disambiguation), multiple people
- Robert Gibson (disambiguation), multiple people
- Robin Gibson (disambiguation), multiple people
- Sally Gibson, Canadian writer and historian
- Sam Gibson (disambiguation), multiple people
- Shane Gibson (disambiguation), multiple people
- Sharon Gibson (born 1961), English javelin thrower
- Shelton Gibson (born 1994), American football player
- Steve Gibson (disambiguation), multiple people
- Taj Gibson (born 1985), American basketball player
- Thomas Gibson (disambiguation), multiple people
- Todd Gibson (1936–2020), American racing driver
- Tom Gibson (disambiguation), multiple people
- Tony Gibson (disambiguation), multiple people
- Trey Gibson (born 2002), American baseball player
- Tyrese Gibson (born 1978), American R&B and hip hop singer and songwriter
- Ursula Gibson, American physicist
- Violet Gibson (1876–1956), Irish would-be assassin of Benito Mussolini
- Virginia Gibson (1925–2013), American dancer, singer and actress
- Walter Gibson (disambiguation), multiple people
- Wilfrid Wilson Gibson (1878–1962), British poet
- William Gibson (disambiguation), multiple people
- Willis Gibson (born 2010), American gamer, "the boy who beat Tetris"
- Zach Gibson (born 2000), American football player
- Gibson (Kent cricketer) (fl. 1780), first name unknown

== Fictional characters ==
- Dallas Gibson (Specter), a mutant character in Marvel Comics
- Lt. Paul Gibson, a character played by Joey Lawrence in the 2016 movie Isle of the Dead
- Gibson, a character played by Zach Steel in the television series A.N.T. Farm

== See also ==
- Justice Gibson (disambiguation)
- Senator Gibson (disambiguation)
