= David Gibson =

David Gibson may refer to:

== Arts and entertainment ==
- Dave Gibson (American songwriter) (born 1946), country songwriter and member of the Gibson/Miller Band
- Dave Gibson (Scottish singer-songwriter), Scottish singer and songwriter
- Dave Gibson, jazz drummer with the Count Basie Orchestra
- David Warren Gibson (born 1952), American actor, dancer, choreographer and artist
- Dave Gibson (producer) (born 1950s), New Zealand screen producer
- David Gibson (photographer) (born 1957), British street photographer and occasional writer on photography
- David Cooke Gibson (1827–1856), Scottish painter
- David Gibson (Scrabble), American Scrabble player
- David Gibson (musician), Canadian pop-rock singer

== Politics ==
- David Gibson (Australian politician) (born 1967), Queensland MP
- David Gibson (Victorian politician) (1873–1940), Victorian MP
- David Gibson (Canadian politician) (1804–1864), surveyor, farmer and political figure in Upper Canada
- David Gibson (British politician), chairman of the Independent Labour Party from 1948 to 1951

== Sports ==
- Dave Gibson (Australian footballer) (1879–1953), Australian rules footballer
- Dave Gibson (Scottish footballer) (born 1938), Scottish football player most associated with Leicester City
- David Gibson (American football) (born 1977), American football safety
- David Gibson (cricketer) (1936–2012), Surrey cricketer
- David Gibson (footballer, born 1895) (1895–1964), Scottish footballer for Kilmarnock and teams in the United States
- David Gibson (footballer, born 1951) (born 1951), Scottish footballer
- David Gibson (rugby union) (born 1980), New Zealand rugby union player

== Others ==
- David Templeton Gibson (1899–1985), British chemist
- David R. Gibson (born 1969), American sociologist
- David Gibson (psychologist) (1926–2006), Canadian clinical psychologist

== See also ==
- David Gibson-Watt, Baron Gibson-Watt (1918–2002), British politician
- Gibson (surname)
