= James Gibson =

James or Jimmy Gibson may refer to:

== Science and academia ==
- James J. Gibson (1904–1979), American psychologist
- James L. Gibson, American political scientist
- James R. Gibson, (1935–2026), Canadian historian and geographer
- James Glen Sivewright Gibson (1861–1951), British architect

== Politics and the law ==
- Sir James Gibson, 1st Baronet (1849–1912), British Member of Parliament for Edinburgh East 1909–1912
- James C. Gibson (1869–1948), Scottish landowner, military veteran, and community leader in British Guiana
- James Gibson (bishop) (1881–1952), Anglican bishop in Canada
- James Gibson (Irish politician), 19th century UK MP for Belfast
- James Gibson (judge) (1902–1992), New York judge
- James Gibson (Missouri politician) (1849–1918), American lawyer, judge and politician
- James Gibson (New York state senator) (1816–1897), New York lawyer and politician
- James Alexander Gibson (1912–2003), Canadian academic, federal bureaucrat and private secretary to prime minister William Lyon Mackenzie King
- James B. Gibson (born 1949), Nevada politician
- James K. Gibson (1812–1879), Virginia congressman
- James William Gibson (1888–1965), politician in Saskatchewan, Canada
- James F. Gibson (Illinois politician)

== Sport ==
- James Gibson (cricketer) (1888–1960), Scottish cricketer
- James Gibson (footballer, born 1989), Scottish footballer (Hamilton Academical)
- James Gibson (footballer, born 1889) (1889–1915), Scottish footballer
- Jamie Noble (born 1976), American professional wrestler born James Gibson
- James Gibson (swimmer) (born 1980), British swimmer
- James W. Gibson (1877–1951), chairman of Manchester United F.C., 1931–1951
- Jamie Gibson (born 1990), English rugby union player
- Jimmy Gibson (footballer, born 1901) (1901–1978), Scottish footballer (Partick Thistle, Aston Villa)
- Jimmy Gibson (footballer, born 1980), Scottish footballer (Rangers FC, Clyde FC, Partick Thistle)
- Jimmy Gibson (ice hockey) (1896–1964), Canadian ice hockey player (Calgary Tigers, Victoria Cougars)

== Other ==
- James Gibson (seaman) (1700–1752), British sea captain, soldier, and merchant
- James Gibson (businessman), co-founder and CEO of Big Yellow Group
- James Gibson (minister) (1799–1871), Church of Scotland and Free Church minister and church history professor
- James Brown Gibson (1805–1868), British military surgeon and director general of the British Army Medical Department
- James Young Gibson (1826–1886), essayist and translator
- James F. Gibson (photographer), American Civil War photographer
