= Jackie Gibson =

Jackie Gibson may refer to:

- Jackie Gibson (athlete) (1914–1944), South African marathon runner
- Jackie Paraiso (born 1966), American racquetball player who has competed under her married name, Gibson
- Jackie (Gibson) Alper, American folk singer

== See also ==
- Jack Gibson (disambiguation)
- John Gibson (disambiguation)
