= I9 =

I9, i9 or I-9 may refer to:

== Science and technology ==
- Intel Core i9, a line of high-performance processors
  - Gulftown, microprocessors originally rumored to be called the Intel Core i9
- Inline-nine engine, a straight engine with nine cylinders
- ICD-9, a coding system for medical diagnoses and procedures

== Other uses ==
- Form I-9, a US Citizenship and Immigration Services form
- Air Italy (2005–2018) (former IATA code: I9), a former Italian airline
- Interstate 9, a proposed upgrade to California State Route 99
- Skaraborg Regiment (infantry) (designation: I 9), a Swedish Army infantry regiment disbanded in 1942
- Japanese submarine I-9, an Imperial Japanese Navy submarine

== See also ==
- I Nine, an American band
- 9I (disambiguation)
