= Donald Gibson =

Donald Gibson may refer to:

- Donald Gibson (architect) (1908–1991), city architect for Coventry from 1938 to 1954
- Donald E. Gibson, American academic administrator and author
- Don Gibson (1928–2003), American songwriter and country musician
- Don Gibson (footballer, born 1929) (1929–2024), English footballer
- Don Gibson (Australian footballer) (1908–1995), Australian rules footballer
- Don Gibson (ice hockey) (born 1967), Canadian retired ice hockey player
- Don Gibson (Home and Away), a fictional character on the Australian soap opera Home and Away
- Donald Gibson (Royal Navy officer) (1916–2000), Royal Navy vice admiral and Fleet Air Arm pilot

== See also ==
- Gibson (surname)
- Dan Gibson (disambiguation)
