= Brian Gibson =

Brian Gibson may refer to:

- Brian Gibson (director) (1944–2004), English film director
- Brian Gibson (musician) (born 1975), American musician
- Brian Gibson (politician) (1936–2017), Australian politician
- Brian Gibson (footballer) (1928–2010), Irish professional footballer
- Brian W. Gibson (born c. 1970), United States Army lieutenant general

== See also ==
- Brian Gibbons (disambiguation)
- Bryan Gibson (born 1947), Canadian retired boxer
- Bryan Gibson (musician) (born 1980), American producer and composer
- Gibson (surname)
