= Lewis Gibson =

Lewis Gibson may refer to:

- H. Lou Gibson (1906–1992), British-American medical photographer
- Lewis Gibson (figure skater) (born 1994), Scottish ice dancer
- Lewis Gibson (footballer), English footballer

== See also ==
- Gibson Lewis, politician
