= Ian Gibson =

Ian Gibson may refer to:

== Sports ==
- Ian Gibson (cricketer) (1936–1963), English cricketer
- Ian Gibson (footballer, born 1943) (1943–2016), Scottish football player (Bradford Park Avenue, Middlesbrough, Coventry, Cardiff)
- Ian Gibson (footballer, born February 1956) (born 1956), Scottish football player (Aberdeen and Kilmarnock)
- Ian Gibson (footballer, born July 1956) (born 1956), Scottish football player and manager (St. Johnstone)
- Ian Gibson (Scottish footballer) (unknown), Scottish football player (Fitzroy United and South Melbourne)

== Others ==
- Ian Gibson (politician) (1938–2021), British academic scientist and Member of Parliament
- Ian Gibson (author) (born 1939), Irish author and historian
- Ian Gibson (comics) (1946–2023), British artist of comic books
- Ian Gibson (businessman) (born 1947), former director of Northern Rock, chairman of Trinity Mirror
- Ian Gibson (professor) (born 1963), scientist and professor

== See also ==
- Gibson (surname)
