= ECS Journal of Solid State Science and Technology =

- Discipline: Solid state science
- Language: English
- Edited by: Krishnan Rajeshwar

Publication details
- History: 2012-present
- Publisher: The Electrochemical Society
- Frequency: Monthly
- Impact factor: 1.8 (2023)

Standard abbreviations
- ISO 4: ECS J. Solid State Sci. Technol.

Indexing
- ISSN: 2162-8769 (print); 2162-8777 (web)
- LCCN: 2011200357
- JSTOR: EJSSBG
- OCLC no.: 746499272

Links
- Journal homepage; Online access; Online archive

The ECS Journal of Solid State Science and Technology is a monthly peer-reviewed scientific journal covering solid state science and technology. The editor-in-chief is Krishnan Rajeshwar (University of Texas at Arlington). The Technical Editors are Francis D'Souza (University of North Texas), Aniruddh Jagdish Khanna (Applied Materials Inc.), Ajit Khosla (Yamagata University), Peter Mascher (McMaster University), Kailash C. Mishra (Osram Sylvania), and Fan Ren (University of Florida). The Associate Editors are Michael Adachi (Simon Fraser University), Netz Arroyo (Johns Hopkins University School of Medicine), Paul Maggard (North Carolina State University), Meng Tao (Arizona State University), and Thomas Thundat (University at Buffalo). The journal was established in 2012 and is published by The Electrochemical Society.

== Abstracting an indexing ==
The journal is abstracted and indexed in the Science Citation Index Expanded, Current Contents/Physical, Chemical & Earth Sciences, Current Contents/Engineering, Computing & Technology, Chemical Abstracts Service, and Scopus. According to the Journal Citation Reports, the journal has a 2023 impact factor of 1.8.
