= Judge Gibson =

Judge Gibson may refer to:

- Benjamin F. Gibson (1931–2021), judge of the United States District Court for the Western District of Michigan
- Ernest W. Gibson Jr. (1901–1969), judge of the United States District Court for the District of Vermont
- Floyd Robert Gibson (1910–2001), judge of the United States Court of Appeals for the Eighth Circuit
- Hugh Gibson (judge) (1918–1998), judge of the United States District Court for the Southern District of Texas
- John R. Gibson (1925–2014), judge of the United States Court of Appeals for the Eighth Circuit
- Kim R. Gibson (born 1948), judge of the United States District Court for the Western District of Pennsylvania
- Reginald W. Gibson (1927–2018), judge of the United States Court of Federal Claims
- Robert Murray Gibson (1869–1949), judge of the United States District Court for the Western District of Pennsylvania

== See also ==
- Justice Gibson (disambiguation)
