= Francis Gibson =

Francis Gibson may refer to:

- Francis Gibson (writer) (1753–1805), English writer and occasional painter
- Francis Gibson (banker) (1805–1858), British banker and businessman
- Francis Gibson (politician), member of the Utah House of Representatives

== See also ==
- Frank Gibson (disambiguation)
