= Henry Gibson (disambiguation) =

Henry Gibson (1935–2009) was an American actor.

Henry Gibson may also refer to:

- Henry R. Gibson (1837–1938), United States congressman
- Henry Gibson (percussionist) (1942–2002), American musician
- Henry Louis Gibson (1906–1992), American medical photographer

== See also ==
- Gibson (surname)
- Henrik Ibsen (1828–1906), Norwegian playwright, theatre director, and poet
