= Charles Gibson (disambiguation) =

Charles Gibson (born 1943) is an American television personality.

Charles or Charlie Gibson may also refer to:

- Charles H. Gibson (1842–1900), U.S. senator from Maryland, 1891–1897, U.S. congressman, 1885–1891
- Charles Gibson (British politician) (1889–1977), British Labour Party politician
- Sir Charles Granville Gibson (1880–1948), British Conservative Party politician
- Charlie Gibson (1900s catcher) (1879–1954), Major League Baseball catcher for the Philadelphia Athletics, 1905
- Charlie Gibson (1920s catcher) (1899–1990), Major League Baseball catcher for the Philadelphia Athletics, 1924
- Charles Dana Gibson (1867–1944), American graphic artist
- Charles Gibson (historian) (1920–1985), American ethnohistorian
- Charles Gibson (special effects artist), visual effects artist Pirates of the Caribbean films
- Charlie Gibson (footballer) (born 1961), Scottish footballer
- Charles Robert Gibson (1870–1931), Scottish author of scientific texts for children
- Charles E. Gibson Jr. (1925–2017), Vermont attorney general
- Charles Hammond Gibson Jr. (1874–1954), American author
- Charles Gibson (rugby union) (1876–1931), England international rugby union player
- Charles Reese Gibson (1842–1925), American politician and newspaperman in Texas

== See also ==
- Gibson (surname)
