= Alex Gibson =

Alex Gibson may refer to:

- Alex Gibson (footballer, born 1925) (1925–1993), Scottish footballer
- Alex Gibson (footballer, born 1939) (1939–2003), Scottish footballer
- Alex Gibson (footballer, born 1982), English footballer
- Alex Gibson (music producer) (born 1974), American record producer
- Alex Gibson (sound editor), British music and sound editor, known for his work on films
- Soulman Alex G, real name Alex Gibson, professional wrestler

== See also ==
- Alexander Gibson (disambiguation)
