= Frank Gibson =

Frank Gibson may refer to:

- Frank Gibson (baseball) (1890–1961), American baseball catcher
- Frank Gibson Jr. (1946–2025), New Zealand jazz drummer
- Frank Gibson (footballer) (1904–1977), Australian rules footballer for Fitzroy
- Sir Frank Gibson (politician) (1878–1965), Australian politician
- Frank M. Gibson (1916/17–?), Canadian businessman
- Frank William Ernest Gibson (1923–2008), Australian biochemist and molecular biologist

== See also ==
- Francis Gibson (disambiguation)
- Frank Gibson Costello (1903–1987), Australian architect
