= Richard Gibson (disambiguation) =

Richard Gibson (born 1954) is a British actor.

Richard Gibson may also refer to:

== Sports ==
- Dick Gibson (footballer) (1866–1943), Australian rules footballer
- Richard Gibson (English footballer) (1889–?), English footballer
- Dick Gibson (American football) (1900–1968), American football player
- Dick Gibson (racing driver) (1918–2010), British racing driver
- Ricky Gibson (wrestler) (1952–2006), American wrestler
- Rick Gibson (golfer) (born 1961), Canadian golfer

== Others ==
- Richard Gibson (MP) (died 1534), Member of Parliament for New Romney constituency, Kent
- Richard Gibson (painter) (1615–1690), English miniature painter and court dwarf
- Richard Gibson (priest) (died 1904), Archdeacon of Suffolk
- Patrick Gibson, Baron Gibson (Richard Patrick Tallentyre Gibson, 1916–2004), British businessman in the publishing industry
- Richard Thomas Gibson (born 1931), American journalist, member of the Fair Play for Cuba Committee, fired from Agence France-Presse
- Richard Gibson (architect) (1935–2024), British architect
- Rick Gibson (born 1951), Canadian sculptor and artist
- Richard Gibson (composer) (born 1953), Canadian classical music composer
