= 9I =

9I or 9-I may refer to:

- Alliance Air (airline IATA designator code)
- 9i, software release of Oracle Database

== See also ==
- I9 (disambiguation)
