= Susan Penelope Rosse =

English miniature painter

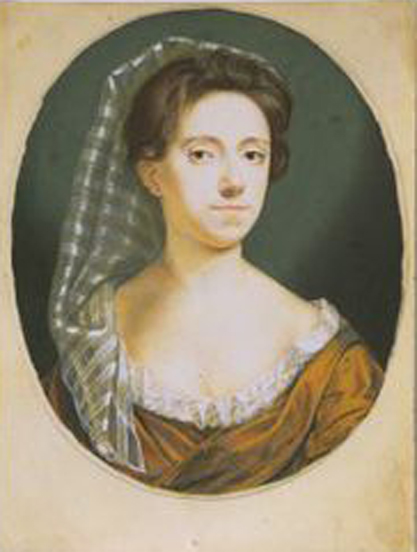
- A presumed self-portrait of Susan Penelope Rosse, c. 1685-90
- Born: Susan Penelope Gibson; 1652
- Died: 1700 (aged 47-48)
- Known for: Portrait miniatures
- Notable work: Portrait of Gilbert Burnet

Susan Penelope Rosse (also known as Susannah Penelope Rosse) (1652–1700) was an English painter. She painted portrait miniatures. She was the daughter of painter Richard Gibson. Her most notable artwork is a portrait of Gilbert Burnet.

== Life ==
Susan Penelope Gibson was born in 1652. Her parents Anne (née Sheppard) and Richard Gibson (1615–1690) worked as “court dwarfs”. Anne served Queen Henrietta Maria and Richard worked for King Charles I.

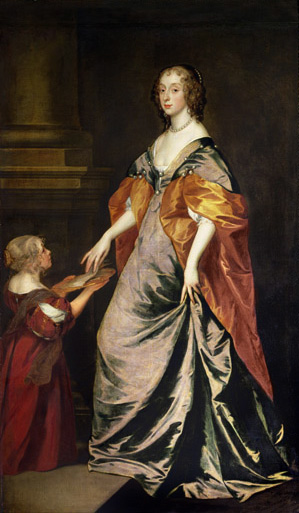
Duchess of Lennox and Richmond with her lady’s maid, the dwarf, Anne Shepherd (Mrs. Gibson) by Anthony van Dyck

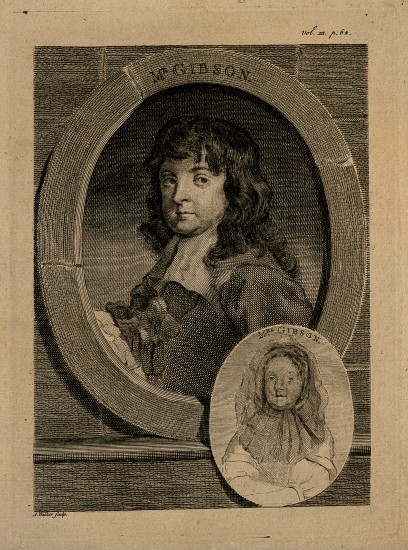
Richard Gibson with wife Anne. Line engraving by A. Walker after Peter Lely

Susan was the eldest of their children, all of whom were of standard height. She was raised in London. Her father was miniature painter Richard Gibson. She grew up next to artist Samuel Cooper. They remained close friends for their entire lives. She married jeweler Michael Rosse. The couple lived in London on Henrietta Street. The home was formerly owned by Samuel Cooper. Gibson died in 1700 aged 47 or 48.

== Work ==
She learned how to paint miniatures from her father. She painted members of the court of Charles II of England. She also painted many portraits of her neighbors while living on Henrietta Street. She was said to have created work that exceeded in quality that of her father and owed a lot to the skills of Samuel Cooper.
