= Edward Gibson (disambiguation) =

Edward Gibson (born 1936) is a former NASA astronaut.

Edward Gibson may also refer to:

- Edward Gibson (painter) (1668/9–1701), English portrait painter and draughtsman
- Edward Gibson, 1st Baron Ashbourne (1837–1913), Irish lawyer and Lord Chancellor of Ireland
- Hoot Gibson (1892–1962), American actor, real name Edmund Gibson, but once billed as Edward
- Edward H. Gibson (1872–1942), U.S. Army sergeant awarded the Medal of Honor for actions during the Philippine–American War
- Edward Gibson (cricketer) (1899–1944), English cricketer
- Eppie Gibson (Edward Gibson), rugby league footballer of the 1940s and 1950s for England, and Workington Town
- Det. Ed Gibson, fictional character played by Larry Hagman on daytime soap opera The Edge of Night
