= William Gibson (painter) =

English miniature painter (1644–1702)

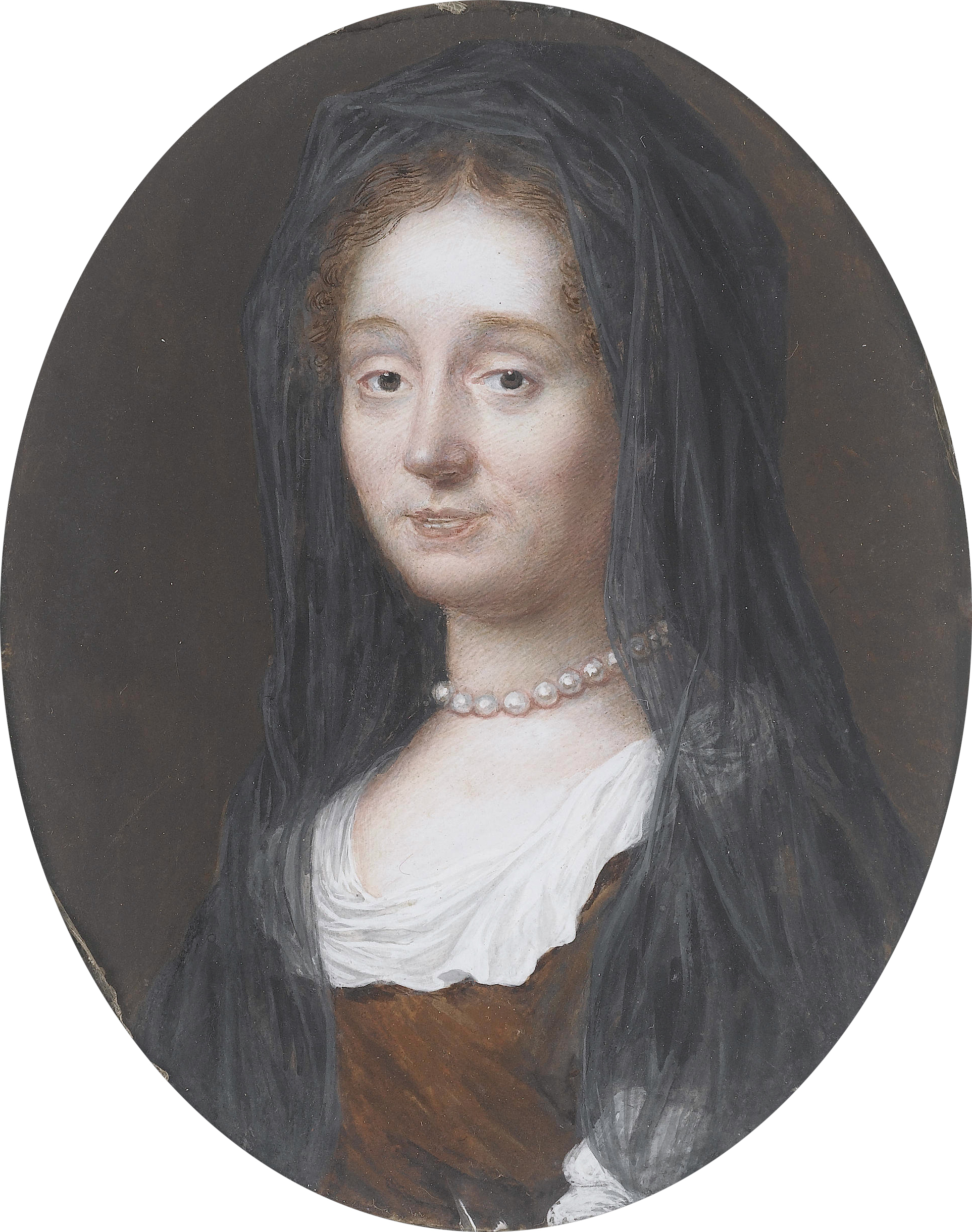
Mary Eyre, née Bigoe, attributed to Gibson

William Gibson (1644–1702) was an English miniature painter. He was a pupil and copyist of Lely.

== Biography ==
=== Early life and career ===
William Gibson was nephew of Richard Gibson, the dwarf, from whom he received instruction. He was also a pupil of Sir Peter Lely, and was very successful in his copies of Lely's works. He attained great eminence as a miniature painter, and was largely employed by the nobility. At the sale of Lely's collection of prints and drawings by the old masters, Gibson bought a great number, and added considerably to them by subsequent purchases.

=== Some of his works are ===
- Image for Louise Renée de Kerouaille, Duchess D'Aubigny and First Duchess of Portsmouth (1644-1702).
- Image of Diane de Vere, Duchess of Albans (1695).

=== Death ===
He resided in the parish of St. Giles-in-the-Fields, and died of a "lethargy" in 1702, aged 58. He was buried at Richmond in Surrey.

== See also ==
- Edward Gibson (painter)
