= Greg Gibson =

Greg or Gregory Gibson may refer to:

- Greg Gibson (wrestler) (born 1953), American wrestler
- Greg Gibson (umpire) (born 1968), umpire in Major League Baseball
- Gregory Gibson, American author
- Gregory Gibson (scientist) (born 1963), geneticist at the Georgia Institute of Technology
- Greg Gibson (runner) (born 1954), American middle-distance runner, 1974 All-American for the Washington Huskies track and field team
