= Brian Gibbons =

Brian Gibbons may refer to:

- Brian Gibbons (politician) (born 1950), Welsh politician
- Brian Gibbons (ice hockey, born 1947), Canadian retired professional ice hockey player
- Brian Gibbons (ice hockey, born 1988), American professional ice hockey player

== See also ==
- Brian Gibson (disambiguation)
