= Thomas Thundat =

American scientist

Thomas G. Thundat FAPS, FAAAS, FECS, FASME, FSPIE, FNAI, FAIMBE, FIEEE
- Born: 1957 (age 68–69)
- Education: University of Kerala, Indian Institute of Technology Madras, SUNY Albany
- Spouse: Darilyn Songstad
- Scientific career
- Fields: Nanotechnology, atomic force microscopy, scanning probe microscopy, cantilevers, sensors, single-wire transmission line, wireless power transmission, MEMS, NEMS, nanomechanics, batteries, fuel cells, supercapacitors, chemical physics, biophysics, transport phenomena, quantum confinement, optoelectronics, composite materials
- Workplaces: Arizona State University; Oak Ridge National Laboratory; University of Tennessee at Knoxville; University of Alberta; National Institute for Nanotechnology; University at Buffalo; Indian Institute of Science; University of Burgundy; Shanghai Jiao Tong University; Bell Labs; Battelle Memorial Institute
- Doctoral advisor: Walter Maxwell Gibson

Thomas George Thundat (born 1957) is an Indian-American scientist. He is currently the SUNY Distinguished Professor and a SUNY Empire Innovation Professor of Chemical & Biological Engineering at the University at Buffalo. Thundat conducts research in the field of nanosensors and microcantilevers.

He previously had a temporary appointment as an honorary Distinguished Professorship at the Indian Institute of Technology, Madras, a Centenary Professorship at the Indian Institute of Science, Bangalore, and holds a One Thousand Talents Professorship at the Shanghai Jiao Tong University, China. He has held visiting faculty positions at the University of Tennessee in Knoxville, and the University of Burgundy in France.

Before arriving at UB, Thundat was a Canada Excellence Research Chair professor in Oilsands Molecular Engineering at the University of Alberta, and a Fellow of the National Institute for Nanotechnology (NRC-NINT) in Edmonton. Previously, he worked for many years at the Oak Ridge National Laboratory (ONRL), where he was a UT-Battelle Corporate Fellow and group leader of the Nanoscale Science and Devices Group.

== Education ==
He received his BSc in Physics from the University of Kerala in 1978, and an MSc in Physics from IIT Madras in 1980. He earned a PhD in physics from SUNY Albany in 1987. Thundat's doctoral advisor was Walter Maxwell Gibson.

Thundat then was a postdoctoral fellow at Arizona State University.

== Research ==
Thundat conducts research on nanomechanical sensors. He has worked on the development of high-performance ultra-precise molecular-scale sensing, imaging and characterization systems based on microcantilevers. His work has been featured in press outlets such as Time.

He has also conducted research on the development of single wire (single-contact) electricity transmission concept (2010), the development of hyphenated sensor concepts (for combining electrical, optical, and mechanical resonances) (2000), a novel class of physical, chemical, and biological sensors based on adsorption-induced force (1991), and the concept of micromechanical infrared detection & imaging technique including mechanical Infrared spectroscopy (1995).

He is a co-author on more than 500 peer-reviewed publications in refereed journals, about 50 book chapters, and around 50 US patents. His research articles have been cited more than 30,000 times with an h-index of almost 100.

Thundat's recent research has focused on physical, chemical, and biological detection using nanomechanical sensors as well as single-wire electrical power delivery. His other areas of expertise include the chemical physics of interfaces, biophysics, nanoscale transport phenomena and quantum confinement. Thundat's research group has developed novel high-performance sensor platforms and concepts based on atomic-scale interface engineering. His team is also working on single-contact electricity transmission — similar to what Nikola Tesla had envisioned. The concept uses high-frequency electrical standing waves to power a network of devices in quasi-wireless mode.

== Honors ==
Thundat has received several scientific and research awards, including the U.S. Department of Energy’s Young Scientist Award, three R&D 100 Awards, the ASME Pioneer Award, was a finalist for the 1998 and 2000 Discover Magazine Awards, served on the editorial advisory board of the Scientific American Top 50 Technology Leaders Award, the Jesse Beams Medal, Foresight Institute Nano 50 Award, and multiple national awards from the Federal Laboratory Consortium for excellence in technology transfer. Oak Ridge National Laboratory named him Inventor of the Year twice. He is also a Battelle Memorial Institute Distinguished Inventor. He serves on the editorial boards of 25 international journals.

== Fellowships ==
Thundat has been elected Fellows of the American Physical Society (APS) (2002), the Electrochemical Society (ECS) (2008), the American Association for Advancement of Science (AAAS) (2006), the American Society of Mechanical Engineers (ASME) (2010), the SPIE (2012), the Institute of Electrical and Electronics Engineers (IEEE) (2021), the American Institute for Medical and Biological Engineering (AIMBE) (2017), and the National Academy of Inventors (NAI) (2014).
