= Herbert Gibson =

Herbert Gibson may refer to:

- Herbert Gibson (politician) (1896–1954), British politician
- Herbert William Sumner Gibson, Royal Navy
- Sir Herbert Gibson, 1st Baronet, of Great Warley (1851–1932), English lawyer, president of the Law Society, see Gibson baronets
- Sir Herbert Gibson, 1st Baronet, of Linconia and Faccombe (1863–1934), British-Argentinian merchant and agriculturist

== See also ==
- G. H. Gibson (George Herbert Gibson, 1846–1921), Anglo-Australian writer of humorous ballads and verse
- Gibson (surname)
