= Dan Gibson (disambiguation) =

Dan Gibson, Daniel Gibson or Danny Gibson may refer to:

- Daniel Z. Gibson (1908–1984), American academic and academic administrator
- Dan Gibson (1922–2006), Canadian photographer, cinematographer and sound recordist
- Daniel Gibson (born 1986), American former basketball player
- Daniel Gibson (presenter) (born 1972), Australian television presenter
- Daniel Gibson (politician), member of the South Carolina House of Representatives
- Danny Gibson (born 1984), American basketball player

== See also ==
- Don Gibson (disambiguation)
