= Walter Gibson =

Walter Gibson may refer to:

- Walter B. Gibson (1897–1985), American author and magician
- Walter M. Gibson (1822–1888), American adventurer, Mormon missionary, and government official in the Kingdom of Hawaii
- Walter Maxwell Gibson (1930–2009), American chemist
- Walter S. Gibson (1932–2018), American art historian
- Walter Gibson (Lord Provost), Scottish merchant and Lord Provost of Glasgow
