= Ulf Lennart Österberg =

Ulf Österberg is a Swedish-American physicist specializing in optical fibers, nonlinear optics, and ultrafast and THz spectroscopy. With Walter Margulis, he discovered efficient second-harmonic generation in optical fibers, and his optical precursor studies are particular noteworthy.

== Early life and education ==
Österberg was born in Gothenburg, Sweden in 1958, and spent his early years in Trollhättan. He received his MS from Chalmers University of Technology (Engineering Physics) in 1982, and the PhD from the KTH Royal Institute of Technology (Physics) in 1987.

== Research and career ==
Österberg was a visiting researcher with J. Roy Taylor at Imperial College during his PhD, and held a postdoctoral position at the University of Arizona College of Optical Sciences, and was a National Research Council Fellow at the Seiler Research Laboratory, US Air Force Academy, Colorado Springs. He was on the faculty of the Thayer School of Engineering at Dartmouth College from 1990 to 2009, during which time he was a recipient of a Presidential Young Investigator Award from NSF. He received patents on signal encryption methodology using wavelet transforms, and co-founded Lightkey Optical Components, LLC. He also studied optical precursors. In 2009, he moved to the Norwegian University of Science and Technology (NTNU) in Trondheim, Norway, and was inducted into Norges Tekniske VitenskapsAcademi (NTVA), a science and technology organization dating from 1955. His work at NTNU was on broadband THz generation and spectroscopy. His continued interest in pedagogy inspired a return to Dartmouth Engineering in 2018. He is an adjunct faculty member at the KTH Royal Institute of Technology in Stockholm, Sweden.

== Personal life ==
Österberg is married to Ursula Gibson, and they have three children.

== Published works ==
He is the author or coauthor of >120 publications, with >3600 citations.
