= Frank Gibson (footballer) =

Australian rules footballer, born 1904

Personal information
- Full name: Frank Gibson
- Born: 17 March 1904
- Died: 1 April 1977 (aged 73)
- Height: 180 cm (5 ft 11 in)
- Weight: 87 kg (192 lb)
- Position: Ruck

Playing career^{1}
Years	Club	Games (Goals)
1928–32	Fitzroy	63 (10)
- ^{1} Playing statistics correct to the end of 1932.

Frank Gibson (17 March 1904 – 1 April 1977) was a former Australian rules footballer who played with Fitzroy in the Victorian Football League (VFL).
