= Francis Gibson (writer) =

English writer (1753–1805)

- Born: 16 January 1753; Whitby, England
- Died: 24 July 1805 (aged 52); Whitby, England
- Occupation: Writer

Francis Gibson (16 January 1753 (baptised) – 24 July 1805) was an English writer and occasional painter.

Gibson was born and baptised in Whitby on 16 January 1753. He was the son of Joseph and Mary Gibson. He became a seaman, voyaged to North America, and afterwards, as master mariner in a ship of his father's, to the Baltic. In 1787 he was, on the recommendation of Lord Mulgrave, appointed to the collectorship of customs at Whitby, which office he held till his death on 24 July 1805. He was twice married, and had issue.

== Notable works ==
- Sailing Directions for the Baltic, 1791. These are said to have been employed with advantage by the Battle of Copenhagen of 1801 under Sir Hyde Parker and Nelson.
- Streanshall Abbey, or the Danish Invasion, Whitby, 1800. This is a play in five acts, dedicated to Lady Mulgrave. It was first performed at the Whitby Theatre 2 December 1799. It went through two (probably limited) editions in the year of its publication.
- Memoirs of the Bastile, a translation of an account published under the sanction of the National Assembly of France, Whitby, 1802.
- Poetical Remains, Whitby, 1807. Poetical Remains at the Internet Archive
