= Hugh Gibson =

Hugh Gibson may refer to:

- Hugh Gibson (American pioneer) (1741–1826), Pennsylvania pioneer who escaped after being captured by members of the indigenous Lenape nation
- Hugh Gibson (judge) (1918–1998), American judge from Texas
- Hugh Gibson (politician) (born 1941), American politician from Florida
- Hugh S. Gibson (1883–1954), American diplomat
- Hugh Gibson, pastoralist who built the Glenample Homestead in Victoria, Australia
- Hugh Gibson, Canadian filmmaker most noted for the 2016 documentary film The Stairs
