= Steve Gibson =

Steve Gibson may refer to:

- Steve Gibson (businessman) (born 1958), English entrepreneur and chairman of Middlesbrough Football Club
- Steven Gibson, CEO of Righthaven LLC, a copyright holding company
- Steve Gibson (computer programmer) (born 1955), American computer engineer and journalist
- Steve Gibson (politician), Republican member of the Montana Legislature
