= Shane Gibson =

Shane Gibson may refer to:

- Shane Gibson (politician) (born 1961), Bahamian Member of Parliament
- Shane Gibson (musician) (1979–2014), backing guitarist for the American metal group Korn
- Shane Gibson (basketball) (born 1990), American basketball player
