= Dave Gibson (Australian footballer) =

Australian rules footballer

Personal information
- Full name: David Gibson
- Born: 17 February 1879; East Melbourne, Victoria
- Died: 26 March 1953 (aged 74); Mentone, Victoria
- Original team: Melbourne Grammar

Playing career^{1}
Years	Club	Games (Goals)
1898	St Kilda	10 (0)
- ^{1} Playing statistics correct to the end of 1898.

Dave Gibson (17 February 1879 – 26 March 1953) was an Australian rules footballer who played with St Kilda in the Victorian Football League (VFL).
