= Michael Gibson =

Michael Gibson may refer to:

- Michael Gibson (Australian footballer) (born 1965), former Australian rules footballer
- Michael Gibson (British Army soldier) (1906–1941), bomb disposal expert
- Michael Gibson (musician) (1944–2005), musician and orchestrator
- Michael Gibson (TV presenter) (born 1980), English television presenter and documentary director
- Michael Gibson (soccer) (born 1963), Australian international footballer
- Mike Gibson (American football) (born 1985), American football guard for the Philadelphia Eagles
- Mike Gibson (footballer) (born 1939), English former association football player
- Mike Gibson (rugby union) (born 1942), Irish former rugby union footballer
- Michael Gibson (rugby union) (born 1954), Irish former rugby union footballer
- Mike Gibson (basketball), (born 1960) American retired basketball player
- Mike Gibson (sports journalist), (1940-2015) Australian sports journalist
- Michael Francis Gibson (1929–2017), art critic, art historian, and writer
