= Rachel Gibson =

Rachel Gibson may refer to:

- Rachel Gibson (writer), American romance novelist
- Rachel Gibson (Alias), fictional character played by Rachel Nichols in the spy-fi television series Alias
