= Alex Gibson (footballer, born 1939) =

Scottish footballer

Personal information
- Full name: Alexander Pollock Stitt Gibson
- Date of birth: 28 November 1939
- Place of birth: Kirkconnel, Scotland
- Date of death: 22 November 2003 (aged 63)
- Place of death: Basford, England
- Position: Central defender

Senior career*
Years	Team	Apps	(Gls)
- Auchinleck Talbot
1959–1969	Notts County	347	(10)
- Boston United
Total		347	(10)
- * Club domestic league appearances and goals

Alexander Pollock Stitt Gibson (28 November 1939 – 22 November 2003) was a Scottish professional footballer who played as a central defender.

== Career ==
Born in Kirkconnel, Gibson played for Auchinleck Talbot, Notts County and Boston United.
