= Jimmy Gibson (ice hockey) =

Canadian ice hockey player

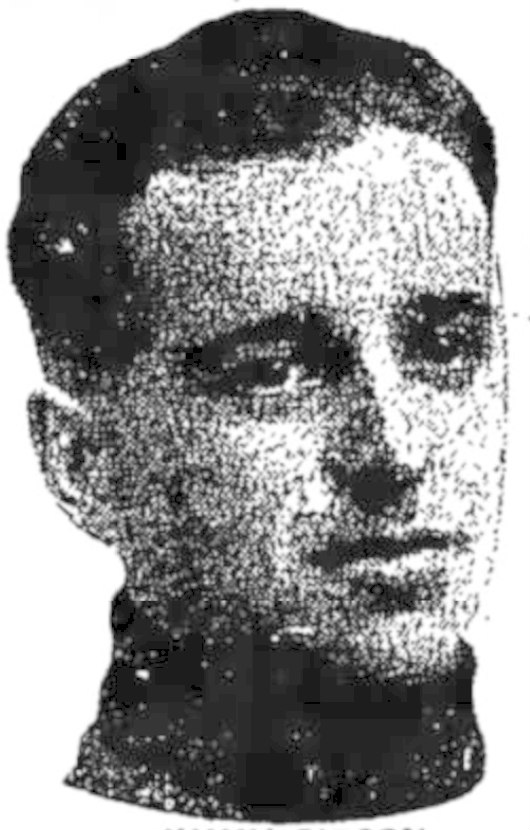
- Born: March 2, 1896 Rat Portage, Ontario, Canada
- Died: May 28, 1964 (aged 68) Winnipeg, Manitoba, Canada
- Height: 5 ft 8 in (173 cm)
- Weight: 147 lb (67 kg; 10 st 7 lb)
- Position: Centre
- Played for: Calgary Tigers; Victoria Cougars
- Playing career: 1917–1927

James Gibson (March 2, 1896 – May 28, 1964) was a Canadian professional ice hockey player. He played with the Calgary Tigers of the Western Canada Hockey League. He also played for the Victoria Cougars of the Pacific Coast Hockey Association.

Prior to becoming a professional Gibson played amateur and senior ice hockey in Winnipeg.
