= Benjamin Gibson =

Benjamin Gibson may refer to:

- Ben Gibson (born 1993), English footballer
- Ben Gibson (politician) (1882–1949), American politician and lawyer
- Ben Gibson, illustrator known for work on The Selected Works of T. S. Spivet
- Ben Gibson, photographer known for work on Battle of the Beanfield
- Ben Gibson, fictional character portrayed by Doug Sheehan in Knots Landing
- Ben Gibson (soccer, born 2003), Australian footballer
- Benjamin F. Gibson (1931–2021), American judge
