= Bob Gibson (disambiguation) =

Bob Gibson (1935–2020) was an American baseball pitcher who was inducted into the Baseball Hall of Fame.

Bob Gibson is also the name of:

== Sports ==
- Bob Gibson (footballer, born 1887) (Robert James Gibson, 1887-?), English footballer, see List of Bury F.C. players (1–24 appearances)
- Bob Gibson (American football) (1927–2015), former head coach of the Bowling Green University college football program, 1965–1967
- Bob Gibson (footballer) (1927–1989), English football centre forward active in the 1950s
- Bob Gibson (1980s pitcher) (born 1957), American baseball pitcher who played in major leagues, 1983–1987

== Others ==
- Bob Gibson (musician) (1931–1996), folk musician
- Bob Gibson (artist) (1938–2010), illustrated The Beatles' 1967 album The Magical Mystery Tour

== See also ==
- Robert Gibson (disambiguation)
- Rob Gibson (born 1945), Scottish politician
