= Neil Gibson =

Neil Gibson may refer to:

== Sports ==
- Neilly Gibson (born 1873), Scottish footballer
- Neil Gibson (footballer, born 1899), Scottish footballer
- Neil Gibson (footballer, born 1979), Welsh footballer and manager
- Neil Gibson (rower) (born 1962), New Zealand representative rower
- Neil Gibson (tennis), Australian tennis player of the 1950s and 60s

== Others ==
- Neil Gibson, a fictional character in The Problem of Thor Bridge, a Sherlock Holmes story by Arthur Conan Doyle
- Neil Gibson, a television presenter on the Globe Trekker travel series
