= David Gibson (footballer, born 1951) =

Scottish footballer

Personal information
- Full name: David Malcolm Gibson
- Date of birth: 31 January 1951 (age 75)
- Place of birth: Provan, Scotland
- Position: Defender

Youth career
- Garrioch Boys Club

Senior career*
Years	Team	Apps	(Gls)
1969–1974	Queen's Park	39	(0)

International career
1974	Scotland Amateurs	1	(0)
- * Club domestic league appearances and goals

David Gibson (born 31 January 1951) is a Scottish retired amateur football defender who played in the Scottish League for Queen's Park. He was capped by Scotland at amateur level.
