= David Gibson (musician) =

Canadian pop-rock singer

David Gibson is a Canadian pop rock singer. He received a Juno Award nomination for Most Promising Male Vocalist in 1987.

== Career ==
Shortly after leaving school, Gibson toured Canada and Europe with various bands and began writing songs with Robert Uhrig. In the mid 1980s, after recording a six-track demo of original songs written with Uhrig, Gibson was offered a recording deal with Loose End Records in London. The company subsequently dissolved during contract negotiations.

Upon returning to Canada, Gibson met guitarist/producer Domenic Troiano. Gibson signed with Troiano's Black Market label, and "Lock Up My Heart" was recorded and released in the summer of 1986. The single was accompanied by a video directed by Stephen Reynolds. Gibson went on to win the Juno Award nomination in March 1987 .

=== David Gibson (1988) ===
In 1988, Black Market/A&M Records issued Gibson's self-titled album. The album's singles received modest radio airplay, as did the videos for tracks such as "Easy Street," "Lying to Me" and "We Close Our Eyes," which were played on Canada's national music station, MuchMusic and CBC's Video Hits. The album was supported by a cross-Canada tour. The album peaked at number 80 on the Canadian albums chart and spent a total of six weeks on the chart. It ranked number 44 on the top 50 Cancon albums of 1988.

"We Close Our Eyes" was the most successful single from the album, reaching number 36 on the RPM top 100 singles. It spent a total of 12 weeks on the chart.

RPM magazine described the album as a "promising debut" that "should gain considerable attention at CHR". The single "We Close Our Eyes" "[exemplified] the quality of work that's found elsewhere on the album", with "slick production" and "silky smooth vocals" that together created a "glossy sound" with "freshness and originality".

=== Later work ===
The follow-up release, Rhythm Method, came out on Black Market Records in early 1990. However, the A&M distribution deal was no longer in place, and the album had minimal impact.

Over the next few years, Gibson's music was featured heavily on several TV shows across the US, Canada, the UK and France.

In 1996, "I Don't Know", a Gibson/Uhrig-penned song that was recorded by Escapade from Chicago. Several DJ's issued various mixes of the track and it became a breakout hit, particularly in dance clubs, during the summer of 1997. The track charted in Billboard Magazine and appeared on several dance mix compilations.

Gibson released an album of new songs, "Life Lines" in December 2020.

== Discography ==
=== Studio albums ===
Album	Album information	Chart positions
Album	Album information	CAN
David Gibson	Release Date: 16 November 1988; Label: A&M Records; Format: LP (SP 9148), Cassette (CS 9148), CD (CD 9148)	80
Rhythm Method	Release Date: 23 September 1992; Label: Black Market Records; Format: CD (0067)	–
Life Lines	Release Date: 14 December 2020; Format: Digital Download	–

=== Singles ===
Year	Title	Chart positions				Album
Year	Title	CAN	CAN AC	CAN CON	CAN CON AC	Album
1986	"Lock Up My Heart (I Need Your Love)"	―	28	―	6	David Gibson
1987	"Look Who's Crying Now"	82	23	―	4	David Gibson
1988	"We Close Our Eyes"	36	―	8	―	David Gibson
1989	"Easy Street"	62	―	15	―	David Gibson
1989	"Lying to Me"	―	―	34	―	David Gibson
2020	"Anniversary"	―	―	―	―	Life Lines

=== Cancelled single ===
"Cayla" was planned to be the sixth single from David Gibson's debut album, and a remix was released via an A&M Radio Sampler in August 1989. However, no commercial release materialised.

=== Music Videos ===
- "Lock Up My Heart" (Director: Stephen Reynolds)
- "Look Who's Crying Now"
- "We Close Our Eyes"
- "Easy Street"
