= Tony Gibson =

Tony Gibson may refer to:

- Tony Gibson (American football) College football defensive coordinator for NC State and previously West Virginia
- Tony Gibson (psychologist) (1914–2001), English psychologist, anarchist, and model
- Tony Gibson (auto racing) (born 1964), American auto racing crew chief
