= Justice Gibson =

Justice Gibson may refer to:

- Ernest W. Gibson III (1927–2020), associate justice of the Vermont Supreme Court
- Fred L. Gibson (1874–1956), associate justice of the Montana Supreme Court
- James Gibson (judge) (1902–1992), presiding justice of the New York Supreme Court (4th District), and a judge of the New York Court of Appeals
- John Bannister Gibson (1780–1853), justice, and chief justice of the Pennsylvania Supreme Court
- Phil S. Gibson (1888–1984), chief justice of the Supreme Court of California
- Rankin Gibson (1916–2001), associate justice of the Ohio Supreme Court

== See also ==
- Judge Gibson (disambiguation)
