= Darryl Gibson =

Darryl Gibson may refer to:

- Darryl Gibson (lacrosse) (born 1976), Canadian lacrosse coach and former player
- Darryl Gibson (rapper) (born 1967), known as Positive K, American MC and songwriter

== See also ==
- Daryl Gibson (born 1975), New Zealand rugby union footballer
