= Douglas Gibson (disambiguation) =

Douglas Gibson (born 1943) is a Canadian editor, publisher and writer.

Douglas or Doug Gibson may also refer to:

- Douglas Gibson (politician) (1942–2025), South African politician and diplomat
- Doug Gibson (ice hockey) (born 1953), Canadian ice hockey player
- Doug Gibson (ornithologist) (1925/26–1984), Australian ornithologist
- Doug Gibson (swimmer) (1929–1993), Canadian swimmer
