= Kyle Gibson (disambiguation) =

Kyle Gibson may refer to:

- Kyle Gibson (born 1987), American professional baseball pitcher
- Kyle Gibson (basketball) (born 1987), American professional basketball player
- Kyle Gibson (pastor), American pastor and politician
