= Bryan Gibson (musician) =

- Born: Bryan Frederick Gibson; December 31, 1980 (age 45); Orangeburg, South Carolina, US
- Genres: Alternative; Rock; Singer-Songwriter
- Occupations: Record producer; Composer; Songwriter; Musician
- Instruments: Cello; Guitar; Piano; Mandolin
- Years active: 1994–present
- Label: J Records
- Website: bryangibson.com

Bryan Gibson (born Bryan Frederick Gibson; December 31, 1980) is an American record producer, composer, and multi-instrumentalist, best known as the cellist, pianist, and mandolinist, accompanying Chris Cornell on the "Higher Truth" world tour. He is also known as the founder, songwriter, and lead guitarist for the rock band I Nine.

He has over 20 years of performance experience touring with Aslyn, Owen Beverly, Tim Brantley, Jay Clifford, Chris Cornell, and Matisyahu, and was also principal cellist of the USC Symphony while he studied at the University of South Carolina.
