= Edward Gibson (painter) =

English portrait draughtsman (1668/9–1701)

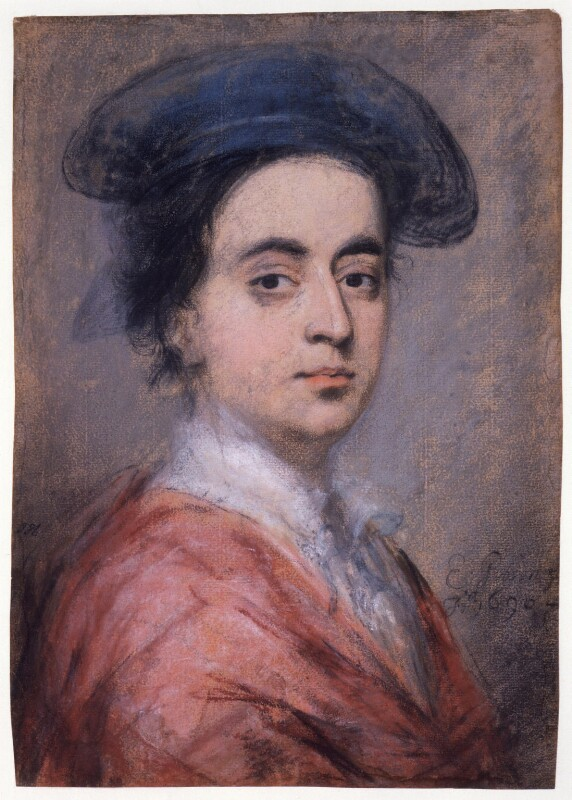
Self-portrait, 1690.

Edward Gibson (1668/9–1701) was an English portrait painter and draughtsman. He excelled in crayon work.

== Life ==
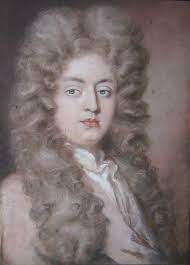
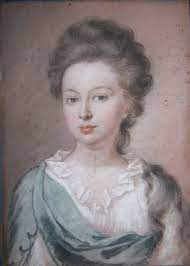
Pendant: Charles Seymour, 6th Duke of Somerset and Elizabeth Seymour, Duchess of Somerset, c. 1710.

Edward Gibson was perhaps the son of Richard Gibson by his wife, Anne, née Sheppard. He was the nephew of William Gibson, from whom he received instruction in painting. He commenced painting portraits in oil, but subsequently found more employment in crayons. In this line he "showed some genius", says Lionel Cust, and was making "great progress" when he died in January 1701 in his thirty-third year. He resided in Catherine Street, Strand, and was buried at Richmond, Surrey.

== Works ==
He drew his own portrait in crayons twice, in one dressed as a Chinese, in the other as a Quaker. One portrait of himself, dated 1690, was at Tart Hall, and another, dated 1696, was formerly in Sir Thomas Lawrence's collection, and was sold at Christie's on 27 March 1866.

== Sources ==
- Cust, L. H.; Peach, Annette (2004). "Gibson, Edward (1668/9–1701), portrait draughtsman". Oxford Dictionary of National Biography (online ed.). Oxford University Press. doi:10.1093/ref:odnb/10616. (Subscription, Wikipedia Library access or UK public library membership required.)
- Jeffares, Neil (9 July 2020). "Gibson, Edward" (PDF). Dictionary of Pastellists Before 1800 (online ed.).

Attribution:

- This article incorporates text from a publication now in the public domain: Cust, Lionel Henry (1890). "Gibson, Edward". In Stephen, Leslie (ed.). Dictionary of National Biography. Vol. 21. London: Smith, Elder & Co. pp. 275–276.
