= Gary Gibson =

Gary Gibson may refer to:

- Gary Gibson (author) (born 1965), Scottish science fiction author
- Gary Gibson (American football) (born 1982), American football defensive tackle
- Sidney Sloane (born 1967), né Gary Gibson, TV presenter
