= Charles Robert Gibson =

Scottish author

Dr Charles Robert Gibson FRSE LLD (1870–1931) was a prodigious and popular 20th century Scottish author of accessible scientific texts aimed at children. He inherited his father’s business of Gibson Brothers & Co. The company owned a large shop at 153 George street in Paisley, Renfrewshire, plus a factory at St Mirrens Mills.

== Life ==
He was born the son of T.B. Gibson a Glasgow curtain manufacturer, and raised at 3 Florentine Place in Hillhead, Glasgow. He inherited the family firm around 1900. The money allowed him to indulge his love of writing about science.

In 1910 he was elected a Fellow of the Royal Society of Edinburgh. His proposers were Magnus Maclean, John Gray McKendrick, Andrew Freeland Fergus and Robert Rattray Tatlock. Glasgow University awarded him an honorary doctorate (LLD) for his works.

In 1911 he lived in Lynton in Mansewood, Pollokshaws.

From 1922 to 1925 he was President of the Philosophical Society of Glasgow.

He died on 6 January 1931.

== Publications ==
- The Romance of Modern Electricity (1906 reprinted 1910)
- Electricity of Today (1907)
- How Telegraphs and Telephones Work (1909)
- Scientific Ideas of Today (1909) several further issues
- The Romance of Modern Manufacture (1910)
- The Autobiography of an Electron (1911)
- Heroes of Science (1912)
- The Romance of Scientific Discovery (1914)
- Wireless Telegraphy and Telephony Without Wires (1914)
- War Inventions and How they were Invented (1918)
- The Marvels of Photography (1919)
- Chemistry and its Mysteries (1920)
- What is Electricity (1920)
- The Wonders of Coal (1930)
