= Donald E. Gibson =

Dean of the O'Malley School of Business at Manhattan College
- Incumbent
- Assumed office 2018 - present

Personal details
- Education: UC Riverside, B.A. San Francisco State, M.A. UCLA, M.B.A., Ph.D
- Occupation: Professor; Administrator

Donald E. Gibson is an American academic administrator and author. He is a professor of management and marketing as well as the dean of the O'Malley School of Business at Manhattan College. Previously he was a dean of the Fairfield University Dolan School of Business and former executive director of the International Association for Conflict Management.

== Education ==
Gibson earned a bachelor's in administrative studies with honors from the University of California, Riverside and a master's in radio and television from San Francisco State University. He then earned a master's of business administration in 1990 and doctorate in 1995 from the UCLA Anderson School of Management.

== Career ==
Gibson began his career working at Lorimar Productions in Los Angeles, where he managed post production and distribution for television shows and motion pictures.

Gibson then entered academia in 1995 when joined the faculty at Yale School of Management as an assistant professor of organizational behavior. Gibson next joined the faculty of the Fairfield University Dolan School of Business in 2001 as an associate professor of management. In 2008, he was appointed as a professor and became chair of the management department. He was named dean of the Dolan School in 2011.

== Scholarly work ==
Gibson has academic articles published in Organization Science, Journal of Management, Journal of Vocational Behavior, Academy of Management Perspectives, Journal of Business Ethics, International Journal of Conflict Management, and Journal of Applied Social Psychology, and a book for practicing managers, Managing Anger in the Workplace. In 2011, his research proposal "The Sound and the Fury: Understanding Anger in the Workplace" received the Robert E. Wall Faculty Award.

== Books ==
- Gibson, Donald (2002). Managing Anger in the Workplace. HRD Press. ISBN 9780-8742-5677-2.
