= Jon Gibson =

Jon Gibson may refer to:

- Jon Gibson (minimalist musician) (1940–2020), American flautist, saxophonist, and composer
- Jon Gibson (Christian musician) (born 1962), American soul and gospel singer, and producer
- Jon M. Gibson (born 1982), American writer and director, and founder of iam8bit

== See also ==
- Jonathan Gibson (disambiguation)
- John Gibson (disambiguation)
