= Andrew Gibson =

Andrew or Andy Gibson may refer to:

== Sportspeople ==
- Andrew Gibson (curler) (born 1979), Canadian curler
- Andrew Gibson (footballer) (1890–1962), Scottish footballer (Southampton FC)
- Andrew Gibson (Scottish footballer) in 2012–13 Hamilton Academical F.C. season
- Andy Gibson (footballer, born 1969), Scottish footballer (Aberdeen FC)
- Andy Gibson (footballer, born 1982), Scottish footballer (Partick Thistle)
- Andy Gibson (golfer) in Maryland Open

== Musicians ==
- Andy Gibson (trumpeter) (1913–1961), American jazz trumpeter, arranger, and composer
- Andy Gibson (singer) (born 1981), American country music singer

== Others ==
- Andrew E. Gibson (1922–2001), American shipping executive
- Andrew Harold Gibson (1883–1971), Canadian commissioner
- Andrew William Gibson (born 1949), British writer and academic
- Andrea Gibson (born 1975), American poet
- Andy Gibson (steamboat), 1884 steamboat
