= Gordon Gibson =

Gordon Gibson may refer to:

- Gordon Gibson Jr (1937–2023), political columnist, author, and former leader of the British Columbia Liberal Party in British Columbia, Canada
- Gordon Gibson Sr. (1904–1986), his father, Canadian business leader and politician based in British Columbia
- Gordon Lionel Gibson (1913–1998), Canadian politician in the Legislative Assembly of British Columbia
- Gordon Gibson (cricketer) (1908–1967), Australian cricketer
