= Jonathan Gibson =

Jonathan Gibson may refer to:

- Jonathan C. Gibson, Sr. (1793–1849), Virginia farmer, lawyer, politician and War of 1812 veteran
- Jonathan C. Gibson (born 1833), American politician and soldier from Virginia
- Jonathan Gibson, mayor of Pocahontas, Virginia
- Jonathan Gibson (burgess) on List of members of the Virginia House of Burgesses
- Jonathan Gibson (basketball) (born 1987), American basketball player
- Jonathan Gibson (athlete), participated in 2007 South American Championships in Athletics

== See also ==
- Jon Gibson (disambiguation)
