= Senator Gibson =

Senator Gibson may refer to:

== Members of the Northern Irish Senate ==
- William Gibson (Ulster Unionist Party politician) (1859/1860–?), Northern Irish Senator from 1935 to 1942

== Members of the United States Senate ==
- Charles H. Gibson (1842–1900), U.S. Senator from Maryland from 1891 to 1897
- Ernest W. Gibson Jr. (1901–1969), U.S. Senator from Vermont from 1940 to 1941
- Ernest W. Gibson (1872–1940), U.S. Senator from Vermont from 1933 to 1940
- Paris Gibson (1830–1920), U.S. Senator from Montana from 1901 to 1905
- Randall L. Gibson (1832–1892), U.S. Senator from Louisiana from 1883 to 1892

== United States state senate members ==
- Audrey Gibson (born 1956), Florida State Senate
- Ben Gibson (politician) (1882–1949), Iowa State Senate
- Carroll Gibson (born 1945), Kentucky State Senate
- Floyd Robert Gibson (1910–2001), Missouri State Senate
- Henry R. Gibson (1837–1938), Tennessee State Senate
- James Gibson (New York state senator) (1816–1897), New York State Senate
- James F. Gibson (Illinois politician) (1879–?), Illinois State Senate
- Ken Gibson (Kentucky politician) (born 1933), Kentucky State Senate
- Thomas K. Gibson (1811–1900), Wisconsin State Senate
- William J. Gibson (died 1863), Wisconsin State Senate
