= Thomas Gibson (disambiguation) =

Thomas Gibson (born 1962) is an American actor and director.

Thomas or Tom Gibson may also refer to:

== Politics ==
- Thomas Gibson (banker) (1667–1744), English banker, member of parliament (MP) for Yarmouth (Isle of Wight) and Marlborough
- Thomas Gibson (American politician) (1750–1814), American Revolutionary War soldier and auditor of the state of Ohio
- Thomas Milner Gibson (1806–1884), British member of parliament and Cabinet Minister
- Thomas K. Gibson (1811–1900), Wisconsin state senator in the 1st Wisconsin Legislature
- Thomas Gibson (Canadian politician) (1825–1901), Canadian political figure from Ontario
- Thomas Gibson-Carmichael, 1st Baron Carmichael (1859–1926), Scottish Liberal politician and colonial administrator
- Tom Gibson (Scottish politician) (1893–1975), Scottish nationalist activist
- Thomas F. Gibson (born 1956), American journalist and White House staff member in the administration of President Ronald Reagan

== Sportspeople ==
- Thomas Gibson (rugby union) (1880–1937), British rugby player
- Tommy Gibson (1888–unknown), Scottish footballer
- Thomas Gibson (rower) (born 1982), Australian rower
- Thomas Gibson (footballer) (1853–1924), English footballer

== Others ==
- Thomas Gibson (physician) (1647–1722), English physician and anatomist
- Thomas Gibson (artist) (c. 1680–1751), English artist
- Thomas Field Gibson (1803–1889), Unitarian silk manufacturer and philanthropist
- Thomas Gibson (priest) (1847–1927), Dean of Ferns
- Tom Gibson (screenwriter) (1888–1950), American screenwriter and film director
- Thomas Gibson (surgeon) (1915–1993), Scottish plastic surgeon
- Tom Gibson (photographer) (1930–2021), Canadian photographer
- Thomas Dean Gibson (born 1988), American missing child, see Disappearance of Thomas Gibson

== See also ==
- Shawn Gibson, soldier, also known as Tom Gibson
- Thomas Gibson Bowles (1841–1922), founder of the magazines The Lady and the English Vanity Fair
