= Kenneth Gibson =

Kenneth Gibson may refer to:

- Kenneth Gibson (cricketer) (1888–1967), English cricketer, played for Essex
- Kenneth Gibson (Scottish politician) (born 1961), Scottish National Party politician
- Kenneth James Gibson (born 1973), experimental, electronic, and dance music artist
- Kenneth A. Gibson (1932–2019), American politician
- Ken Gibson (Kentucky politician), member of the Kentucky Senate
- Ken Gibson (loyalist), Ulster loyalist paramilitary and politician
- Ken Gibson (headteacher), British headteacher
