= Ursula Gibson =

Physicist researching optical fibres

Ursula J. Gibson
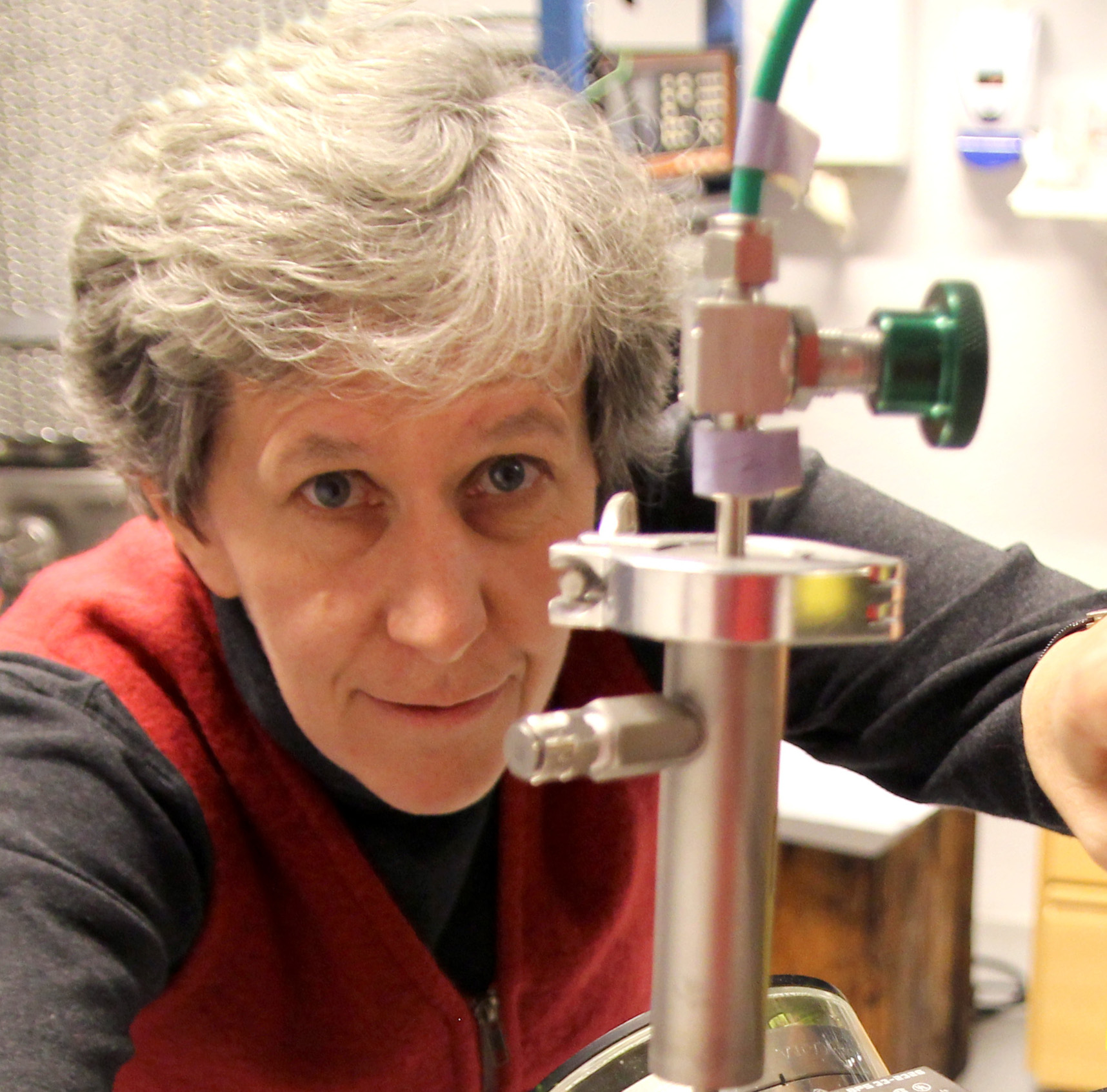
- in 2017
- Education: Dartmouth College; Cornell University
- Scientific career
- Workplaces: Clemson University; Kungliga Tekniska Högskolan; Norwegian University of Science and Technology; Dartmouth College; University of Arizona
- Thesis: Optical and Structural Properties of Thin Film Composites (1982)

Ursula J. Gibson is an American materials scientist who specialises in novel core optical fibres.

== Early life and education ==
Gibson was born in Sheffield, England, and moved to the US in the 1960s, living in the Philadelphia area, then Ithaca, New York. She received in A.B. in physics from Dartmouth College. She received her M.Sc. and Ph.D. from Cornell University under the supervision of Robert Buhrman in 1978 and 1982, respectively. Her graduate research was in the area of thin film composites. During her doctoral work, she held a Bell Laboratories Graduate Research Program for Women grant, and spent two summers working at Bell Labs.

== Research and career ==
After her PhD, Gibson joined the faculty of the University of Arizona, working at the Optical Sciences Center, and was promoted to associate professor. In 1990, Gibson returned to Dartmouth College, joining the faculty of the Thayer School of Engineering where she taught materials science and nanotechnology, participating in interdisciplinary efforts with chemists at Dartmouth and biologists in the Norris Cotton Cancer Center. She was elected to the board of directors of Optica in 2002, and served as the 2019 president of that organization.

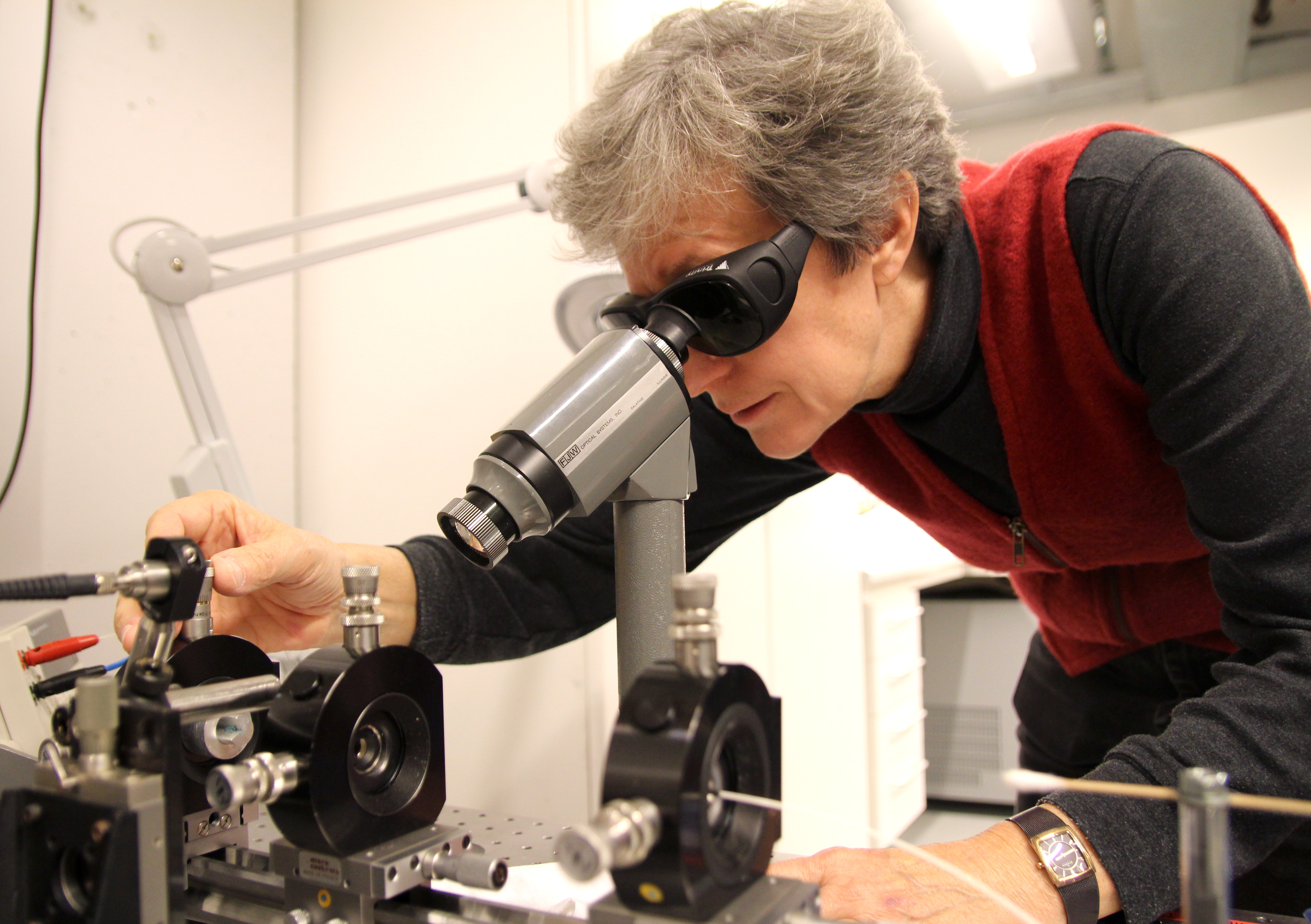
Ursula Gibson, at the NTNU, Faculty of Natural Sciences

Gibson joined the Norwegian University of Science and Technology (NTNU) in 2010. She was elected to the International Commission on Optics Bureau in 2011., and served as the 2019 president of Optica. She retired from NTNU and KTH Royal Institute of Technology in 2021. In addition to an NTNU emerita appointment, she is currently an adjunct professor at Clemson University and emerita at Dartmouth College

Gibson's research on optical materials has been wide-ranging, including polymers, protein crystals and semiconductors, with an emphasis on limited dimension structures such as thin films and waveguides She holds four patents and has authored 7 book contributions. Gibson's present research is focused on semiconductor-core optical fibers.

Gibson works on optical materials and nanostructures, with a focus on photovoltaic cells. In particular, she is developing optical fibres with cores made from group IV and III-V semiconductors. The semiconductor core materials have nonlinear optical and electro-optic properties, and can be produced in bulk quantities. The fibres have low thermal mass and large aspect ratios, which allows laser heat treatment resulting in recrystallization of the semiconductor and spatial homogenization or segregation of the constituents in alloy materials. The laser treatment was used by Gibson to write structures of germanium-rich material in crystalline SiGe core fibres. Rapid directional cooling allows the mixture to form a single crystal, which is optimal for optical transmission, and has superior mechanical properties. Together with physicist Zahra Ghadyani, Gibson founded the company NorFib to commercialize a fiber-based system for generating electricity with solar energy.

In 2017, she was elected to Academia Net by the Swedish Research Council.

Gibson has held visiting positions at the United States Air Force Academy, NASA's Marshall Space Flight Center, Tampere University of Technology (Finland), Chalmers University (Sweden), and the University of Queensland (Australia), among others. She has served as a consultant for many enterprises, including Kodak Inc., the US Department of Defense and the American University of Kuwait.

== Awards and honours ==
- 1997 NASA/American Society for Engineering Education Visiting Research Fellow
- 2001 National Academy of Engineering Frontiers in Engineering
- 2004 NASA Network of Educator Astronaut Teachers
- 2008 Fulbright Fellow at VTT Technical Research Centre of Finland
- 2018 Fellow of Optica (formerly the Optical Society)
- 2019 President of Optica

== Personal life ==
Gibson is married to Ulf Österberg who retired in 2024 from the Thayer School of Engineering; they have three children.
