= Gregory Gibson (scientist) =

Australian geneticist and professor at Georgia Tech

Gregory C. Gibson
- Born: 25 July 1963 (age 62)
- Education: University of Sydney; University of Basel
- Awards: Fellow of the American Association for the Advancement of Science (2006)
- Scientific career
- Fields: Genetics
- Institutions: Georgia Institute of Technology
- Doctoral advisor: Walter Gehring

Gregory C. Gibson (he/him) (born 25 July 1963) is a professor in the School of Biological Sciences at the Georgia Institute of Technology (Georgia Tech), where he is also director of the Center for Integrative Genomics.

== Biography ==
Gibson grew up in Canberra, Australia. He received his undergraduate degree in biology from the University of Sydney in Australia in 1985, and his Ph.D. from the University of Basel in Switzerland in 1989. He was an assistant professor at the University of Michigan from 1994 to 1998, where he received a fellowship from the David and Lucile Packard Foundation. In 1998, he joined the faculty of North Carolina State University as an assistant professor, where he became an associate professor in 2001 and the William Neal Reynolds Distinguished Professor of Genetics in 2005. He was elected a fellow of the American Association for the Advancement of Science in 2006, and served as an Australian Professorial Fellow at the University of Queensland from 2008 to 2009, after which he joined the faculty at Georgia Tech.
