= Chris Gibson =

Christopher or Chris Gibson may refer to:

- Chris Gibson (Australian politician) (born 1951), member of the Tasmanian House of Assembly, 1990–1992
- Chris Gibson (New York politician) (born 1964), United States Representative from New York
- Christopher Gibson (born 1992), Finnish ice hockey goaltender
- Chris Gibson, eye-witness of the Aurora (aircraft)
- Several of the Gibson baronets were called Christopher Gibson
- Chris Gibson, political candidate and brother of Mel Gibson
