= Sam Gibson =

Sam Gibson may refer to:

- Sam Gibson (baseball) (1899–1983), American right-handed pitcher in Major League Baseball
- Sam Gibson (footballer) (born 1986), Australian rules football player
- Sam Franklyn Gibson (born 1952), Sierra Leonean politician
- Sam Gibson (The Young and the Restless), a fictional character from the American soap opera The Young and the Restless
