= Colin Gibson =

Colin Gibson may refer to:

- Colin Gibson (footballer, born 1960), English football fullback or midfielder
- Colin Gibson (footballer, born 1923) (1923–1992), English football forward
- Colin Gibson (musician) (born 1949), bass player and composer
- Colin Gibson (production designer), Australian production designer
- Colin Gibson (artist) (1907–1998), Scottish painter
- Colin W. G. Gibson (1891–1974), Canadian politician, land surveyor and lawyer
- Colin D. Gibson (1922–2002), Canadian lawyer and politician
