= I Nine =

American pop rock band

- Origin: Orangeburg, South Carolina, United States
- Genres: Pop rock
- Years active: 2000–2009
- Label: J Records
- Members: Carmen Keigans; Bryan Gibson; Matt Heath; Brian Whitman
- Website: http://www.inine.com/

I Nine were a pop rock band formed c. 2004. In 2005, filmmaker Cameron Crowe asked the band to perform the closing credits song, "Same in Any Language," for his movie Elizabethtown. After being signed by label J Records, their single "Seven Days of Lonely" was released through iTunes in September 2007 and was subsequently chosen by iTunes as the service's "free single of the week" from February 19 to 25, 2008. Their debut studio album, Heavy Weighs the King, was released on May 6, 2008.

The band disbanded when singer Carmen Keigans elected to pursue college and the men joined a new band, Tent Revival. In 2020, their former producer Rick Beato revealed that the band had reunited and was recording new songs, now under the name Heavy Weighs the King, adopting the name of their 2008 studio album.

== Discography ==
"Seven Days of Lonely"

Single by I Nine

from the album Heavy Weighs the King
- Released: August 28, 2007 (U.S. radio)
- Recorded: 2007
- Genre: Pop rock, Pop
- Length: 3:36 (album version)
- Label: Sony BMG
- Songwriters: Brian Howes & Carmen Keigans

I Nine American singles chronology
"Seven Days of Lonely" (2007)	"If This Room Could Move" (2007)

=== Albums ===
- Heavy Weighs the King (2008) (digital release)
1. "Don't Wanna"
2. "Seven Days of Lonely"
3. "If This Room Could Move"
4. "Get Out"
5. "Black Hole"
6. "Beckon"
7. "Change Nothing"
8. "I'm Alive"
9. "Solar"
10. "I'll Be There"
11. "Ickis Wish"

=== EPs ===
- The EP (2008)

=== Singles ===
- "Seven Days of Lonely" (2007)
- "If This Room Could Move" (2008)
- "Don't Wanna" (2008)

==== Seven Days of Lonely ====
"Seven Days of Lonely" is the first single from I Nine's debut album, Heavy Weighs the King. It was written by the band's lead singer, Carmen Keigans and producer Brian Howes. It was released for download on iTunes on August 28, 2007. A few weeks later, it was chosen as Single of the Week by iTunes and was downloadable for free.

== Formats and track listings ==
=== iTunes single ===
1. "Seven Days of Lonely" - 3:36

== Music videos ==
=== Seven Days of Lonely ===
The music video was produced by RockHard Pictures and directed by Ray Kay. The music video consists of many intercuts of Carmen and her band playing inside a dimly lit room. The story starts with Carmen's character laying down and singing with a streak of light on her face. Then she is standing up and finds a note. Then after the first chorus, she is walking down the stairs and finds another note. Then she is singing in front of a mirror in a bathroom and find another note on the sink. After finding a couple of more notes, she starts crying. After that she runs toward the light that shines outside of the front door. When she is about to cross the door, she finds the last note and runs outside. She gets happy and smiles when she gets to a forest full of green plants. Then she starts running, and she stops and starts jumping. She then lies on the floor and finishes up the song. Each note had a day written on it. The first note was Monday and the last Sunday. Each note read:

- Monday So I hung up the phone. And I screamed out loud. I felt so alone
- Tuesday It's like I'm running in slow motion
- Wednesday it's deafening. The bitter truth
- Thursday Than just getting by
- Friday In a nightmare that never ends
- Saturday I wish you could hold me
- Sunday Through the seven days of lonely
