= Ian Gibson (professor) =

Scottish professor (born 1963)

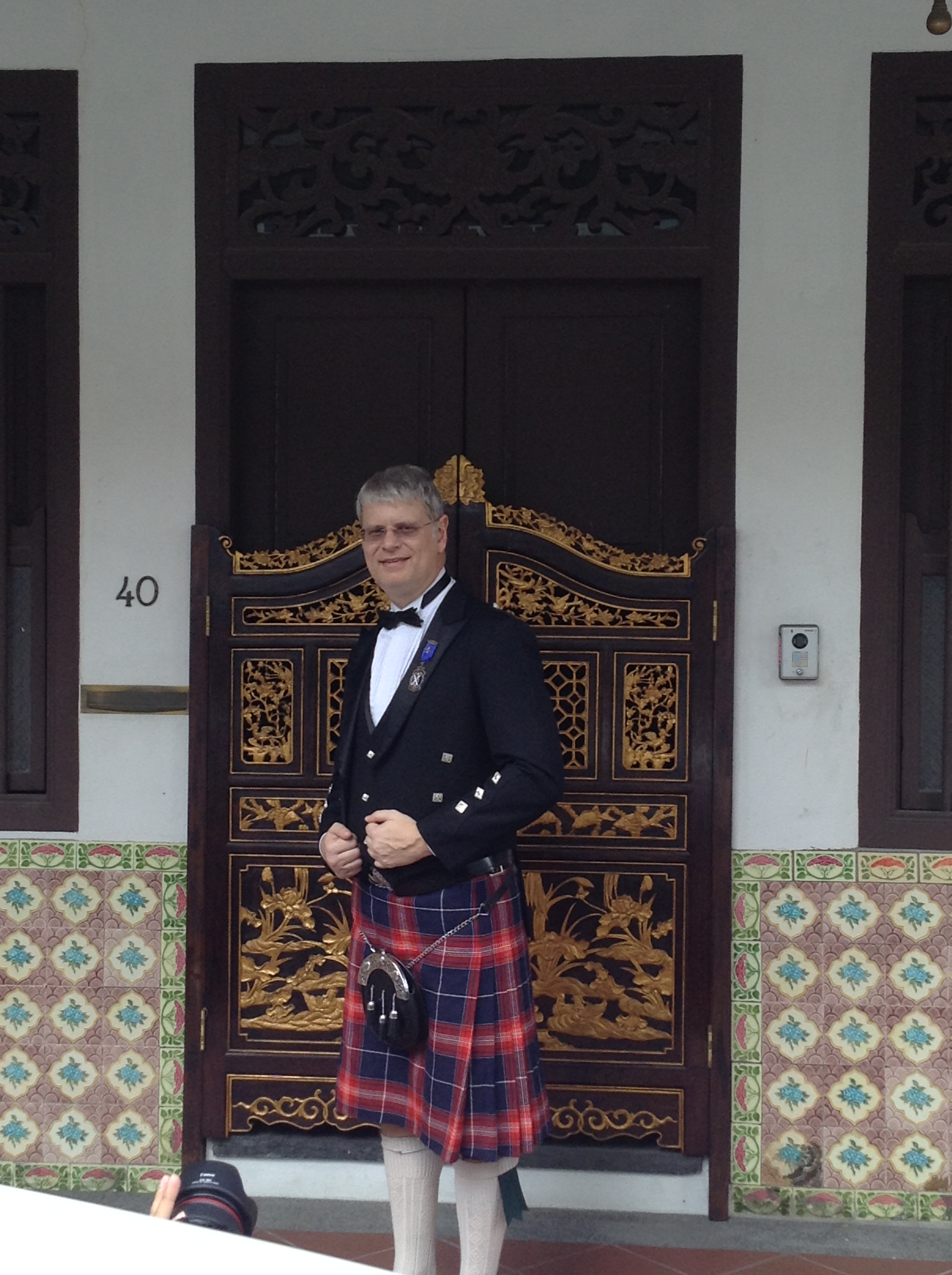
- Ian Gibson in Singapore, 2013
- Born: 7 April 1963 (age 63); Falkirk, Stirlingshire, Scotland
- Education: University of Hull
- Awards: Freeform and Additive Manufacturing (FAME) Award
- Scientific career
- Fields: Additive Manufacturing, Medical Modelling, Rapid Prototyping, 3D Printing, Industrial Design
- Workplaces: University of Twente

Ian Gibson (born 7 April 1963) is a Professor of Design Engineering at the University of Twente. Gibson was selected as the scientific director of Fraunhofer Project Center at the University of Twente and is a recipient of lifetime achievement award, the Freeform and Additive Manufacturing Award. His main areas of research are in at the additive manufacturing, multi-material systems, micro-RP, Rapid Prototyping, Medical Modelling and tissue engineering.

Gibson is also an editor at the Rapid Prototyping Journal and a visiting professor at Deakin University. He has co-authored over 240 articles in peer-reviewed journals and conferences.

== Education ==
Gibson completed schooling from the Wick High School in 1979. He first completed a B.S. in the Electronic Eng in 1984 from the University of Hull in Hull, England and then received a Ph.D. in 1989 in Robotics from the University of Hull.

== Career and research ==
Gibson began his career as an automation and robotics lecturer at the University of Nottingham. From 1994 to 2005, he was a professor at the University of Hong Kong. In 2005, Gibson moved to the National University of Singapore where he worked as an associate professor for 8 years. In 2014, Gibson joined as the professor of Industrial Design at the Deakin University in Geelong, Australia and there he initiated the university’s ‘flagship’ Centre for Advanced Design and Engineering Training (CADET). In 2018, he joined University of Twente. He is also the co-editor of the Rapid Prototyping Journal and co-founder of the Global Alliance of Rapid Prototyping Associations.

Gibson is the recipient of the FAME award for his recognition of his lifetime contribution to 3D printing. He gained recognition for his work on the prosthetic device for total joint replacement in small joint arthroplasty. He has authored book Additive Manufacturing Technologies with David Rosen, Brent Stucker, which is used as a text in the universities.

== Selected publications ==
- Gibson, Ian; Srinath, Aniruddha (1 January 2015). "Simplifying Medical Additive Manufacturing: Making the Surgeon the Designer". Procedia Technology. 20: 237–242. doi:10.1016/j.protcy.2015.07.038. ISSN 2212-0173.
- Gibson, Ian; Rosen, David; Stucker, Brent (26 November 2014). Additive Manufacturing Technologies: 3D Printing, Rapid Prototyping, and Direct Digital Manufacturing. Springer. ISBN 9781493921133.
- Gibson, Ian (14 June 2006). Advanced Manufacturing Technology for Medical Applications: Reverse Engineering, Software Conversion and Rapid Prototyping. John Wiley & Sons. ISBN 9780470032848.
- "Ian Gibson-Software Solutions for Rapid Prototyping-Wiley (2002) | Computer Aided Design | Domain Name". Scribd.
- Gibson, Ian; Shi, Dongping (1997). "Material properties and fabrication parameters in selective laser sintering process". Rapid Prototyping Journal. 3 (4): 129–136. doi:10.1108/13552549710191836.
- Campbell, Ian; Bourell, David; Gibson, Ian (2012). "Additive manufacturing: rapid prototyping comes of age". Rapid Prototyping Journal. 18 (4): 255–258. doi:10.1108/13552541211231563.
- Thompson, Mary Kathryn; Moroni, Giovanni; Vaneker, Tom; Fadel, Georges; Campbell, R. Ian; Gibson, Ian; Bernard, Alain; Schulz, Joachim; Graf, Patricia; Ahuja, Bhrigu; Martina, Filomeno (1 January 2016). "Design for Additive Manufacturing: Trends, opportunities, considerations, and constraints". CIRP Annals. 65 (2): 737–760. doi:10.1016/j.cirp.2016.05.004. hdl:1826/10133. ISSN 0007-8506. S2CID 55627123.
- Gibson, I.; Cheung, L.K.; Chow, S.P.; Cheung, W.L.; Beh, S.L.; Savalani, M.; Lee, S.H. (January 2006). "The use of rapid prototyping to assist medical applications". Rapid Prototyping Journal. 12 (1): 53–58. doi:10.1108/13552540610637273.
- Ho, H.C.H; Gibson, I.; Cheung, W.L (19 May 1999). "Effects of energy density on morphology and properties of selective laser sintered polycarbonate". Journal of Materials Processing Technology. 89–90: 204–210. doi:10.1016/S0924-0136(99)00007-2. ISSN 0924-0136.
- Arafat, M. Tarik; Lam, Christopher X.F.; Ekaputra, Andrew K.; Wong, Siew Yee; Li, Xu; Gibson, Ian (1 February 2011). "Biomimetic composite coating on rapid prototyped scaffolds for bone tissue engineering". Acta Biomaterialia. 7 (2): 809–820. doi:10.1016/j.actbio.2010.09.010. ISSN 1742-7061. PMID 20849985.
- Gibson, Ian; Kvan, Thomas; Wai Ming, Ling (2002). "Rapid prototyping for architectural models". Rapid Prototyping Journal. 8 (2): 91–95. doi:10.1108/13552540210420961.
- Ho, Henry Chung Hong; Cheung, Wai Lam; Gibson, Ian (2003). "Morphology and properties of selective laser sintered bisphenol a polycarbonate". Industrial & Engineering Chemistry Research. 42 (9): 1850–1862. doi:10.1021/ie0206352.
- Dickens, P. M.; Pridham, M. S.; Cobb, R. C.; Gibson, I.; Dixon, G. (1992). "Rapid Prototyping Using 3-D Welding". University of Texas at Austin. doi:10.15781/T2ZW1990V.
- Ho, H.C.H.; Cheung, W.L.; Gibson, I. (2002). "Effects of graphite powder on the laser sintering behaviour of polycarbonate". Rapid Prototyping Journal. 8 (4): 233–242. doi:10.1108/13552540210441148.
- Ma, S.; Gibson, I.; Balaji, G.; Hu, Q.J. (1 October 2007). "Development of epoxy matrix composites for rapid tooling applications". Journal of Materials Processing Technology. 192–193: 75–82. doi:10.1016/j.jmatprotec.2007.04.086. ISSN 0924-0136.
- Gibson, Ian (2006). "Rapid prototyping: from product development to medicine and beyond". Virtual and Physical Prototyping. 1: 31–42. doi:10.1080/17452750500271298. S2CID 110178797.
- Gibson, Ian; Shi, Dongping (1997). "Material properties and fabrication parameters in selective laser sintering process". Rapid Prototyping Journal. 3 (4): 129–136. doi:10.1108/13552549710191836.
- Gibson, Ian (2006). "Rapid prototyping: from product development to medicine and beyond". Virtual and Physical Prototyping. 1: 31–42. doi:10.1080/17452750500271298. S2CID 110178797.
- Ng, C. C.; Savalani, M. M.; Man, H. C.; Gibson, I. (2010). "Layer manufacturing of magnesium and its alloy structures for future applications". Virtual and Physical Prototyping. 5: 13–19. doi:10.1080/17452751003718629. hdl:10397/29094. S2CID 135510521.
- Tarik Arafat, M.; Gibson, Ian; Li, Xu (2014). "EmeraldInsight". Rapid Prototyping Journal. 20: 13–26. doi:10.1108/rpj-03-2012-0023.
- Gibson, Ian (2005). "Rapid Prototyping: A Tool for Product Development". Computer-Aided Design and Applications. 2 (6): 785–793. doi:10.1080/16864360.2005.10738342. hdl:10536/DRO/DU:30097493.
- Ming, Ling Wai; Gibson, Ian (2002). "Specification of VRML in Color Rapid Prototyping". International Journal of CAD/CAM. 1 (1): 1–9.
