= Ernest Gibson =

Ernest Gibson may refer to:

- Ernest W. Gibson (1872–1940), U.S. representative and senator from Vermont
- Ernest W. Gibson Jr. (1901–1969), his son, governor and U.S. senator from Vermont
- Ernest W. Gibson III (born 1927), Vermont Supreme Court judge
- Ernest Gibson (American football) (born 1961), former American football cornerback
