= David Cooke Gibson =

Scottish painter and poet

David Cooke Gibson (4 March 1827 – 5 October 1856) was a Scottish painter and poet.

== Early life ==
Gibson was born in Edinburgh in 1827, the son of a portrait-painter who died early of tuberculosis, leaving a widow, David, and a daughter. After four years at Edinburgh High School, he was admitted to the Trustees' Academy. Here he passed through the ornamental class under Charles Heath Wilson, studied the collection of plaster casts of antique sculptures under Sir William Allan, and attended the colour class and life class under Thomas Duncan.

Before he was seventeen years of age he was the chief support of his mother and sister, resigning all chance of a college career to devote himself to portrait-painting. His mother, Ann Gibson, died soon after September 1844, and his sister in December 1845 of tuberculosis. Gibson had acquired the same disease.

He was described as a social favourite, fond of dancing, an excellent mimic, eminently handsome and graceful, though diminutive in figure.

== Career development ==
In January 1846 Gibson obtained three prizes at the Trustees' Academy. A month later two of his small pictures were badly hung at the Royal Scottish Academy, and he asked to withdraw one of these. He made a tour of London, Belgium, and Paris, studying in the great galleries. His copy of Van Dyck's Charles I was bought by Sir Edwin Landseer after Gibson's death. Returning to Edinburgh he worked hard at portraits.

He moved to London in April 1852. At this time he wrote an immense quantity of easy and sometimes humorous verse. He had disappointments, was discontented, and listened to socialists and sceptics. He was attracted by the Pre-Raphaelites, and his picture The Little Stranger, exhibited at the Royal Academy of Arts in 1855, was sold for £100. After revisiting Scotland he was advised to go abroad for his health, and passed the winter of 1855–6 at Málaga.

== Final year ==
Some of his Spanish pictures were exhibited in the Royal Academy in 1856, and some of them were bought by John Phillip. Gibson visited the Alhambra in March 1856, and made many sketches. Thomas Creswick had bought one of Gibson's pictures before the opening of the Academy's exhibition for £150. Gibson returned to England in June, but unfortunately lingered there too long. He broke a blood-vessel in September, and died on 5 October 1856. In the following May his Gipsies of Seville was exhibited in the Academy. He had bequeathed to William Menzies Tweedie his picture of the Alhambra Towers with the Sierra Nevada in the distance, A Pleasing Prospect, and it was chromolithographed and published.
