= Margaret Gibson =

Margaret Gibson may refer to:

- Margaret Gibson (actress) (1894–1964), American actress
- Margaret Gibson (rower) (born 1961), Zimbabwean Olympic rower
- Margaret Gibson (writer) (1948–2006), Canadian novelist and short story writer
- Margaret Gibson (historian) (1938–1994), British medieval historian and academic
- Margaret Gibson (poet) (born 1944), American poet
- Margaret Gibson (swimmer) (born 1938), Australian swimmer
- Margaret Dunlop Gibson (1843–1920), British orientalist
- Margaret Muriel Gibson (politician) (1912–2005), Scottish nationalist politician
