= Alexander Gibson =

Alexander Gibson may refer to:

- Alexander Gibson, Lord Durie I (died 1644), Scottish judge
- Alexander Gibson, Lord Durie II (died 1656), Scottish judge, son of Alexander Gibson, Lord Durie I
- Alexander Gibson (botanist) (1800–1867), botanist and forester in India
- Alexander Craig Gibson (1813–1874), folklorist around Coniston, Cumbria
- Alexander Gibson (conductor) (1926–1995), Scottish conductor and music director
- Alexander Gibson (industrialist) (1819–1913), Canadian industrialist
- Alexander Gibson (politician) (1852–1920), Canadian politician
- Alexander George Gibson (1875–1950), English physician
- Alexander James Gibson (1876–1960), professor of engineering at University of Queensland in Australia

== See also ==
- Alex Gibson (disambiguation)
