= James Gibson (minister) =

Scottish minister (1799–1871)

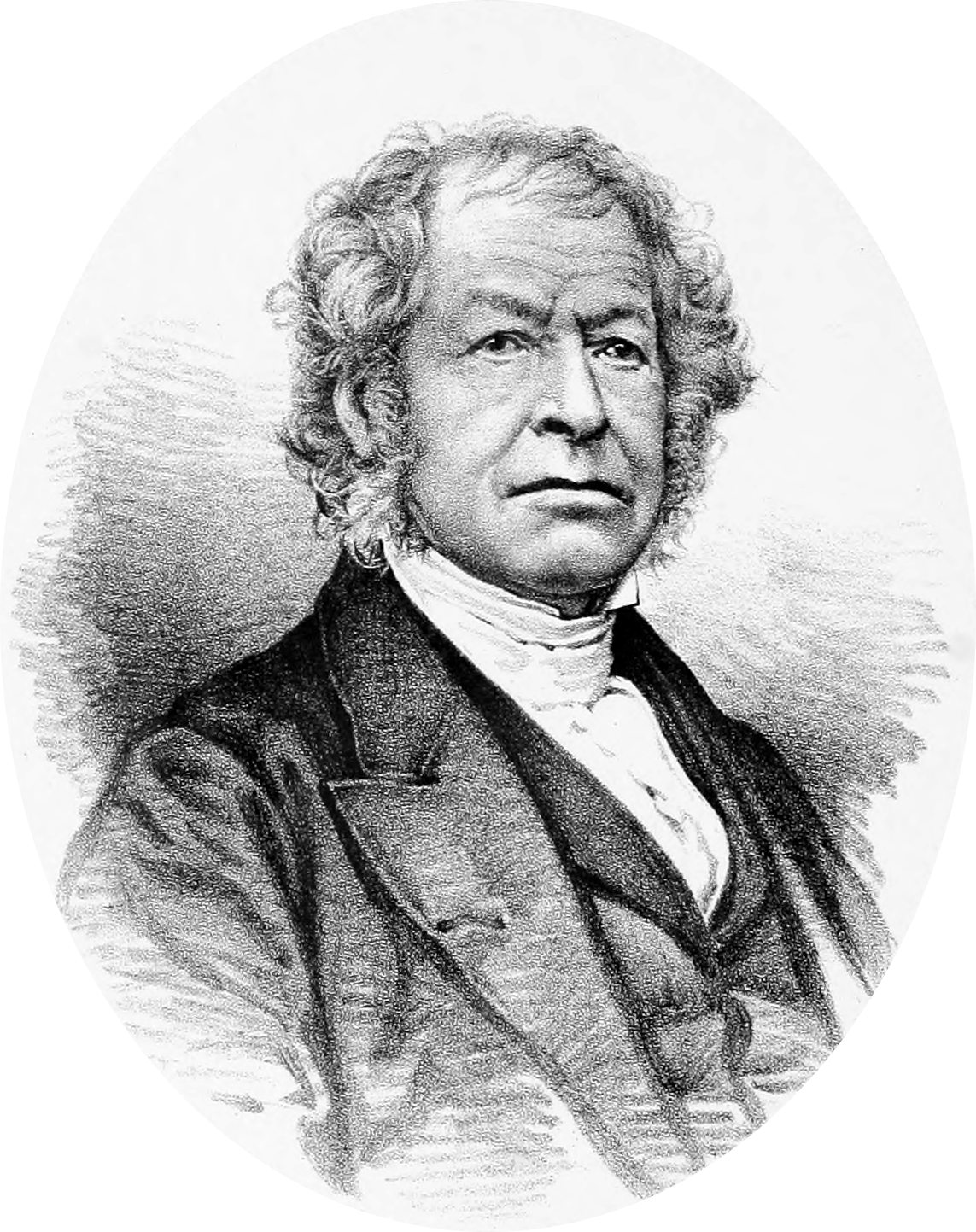
- James Gibson from Disruption Worthies

Personal details
- Born: 31 January 1799
- Died: 2 November 1871 (aged 72)

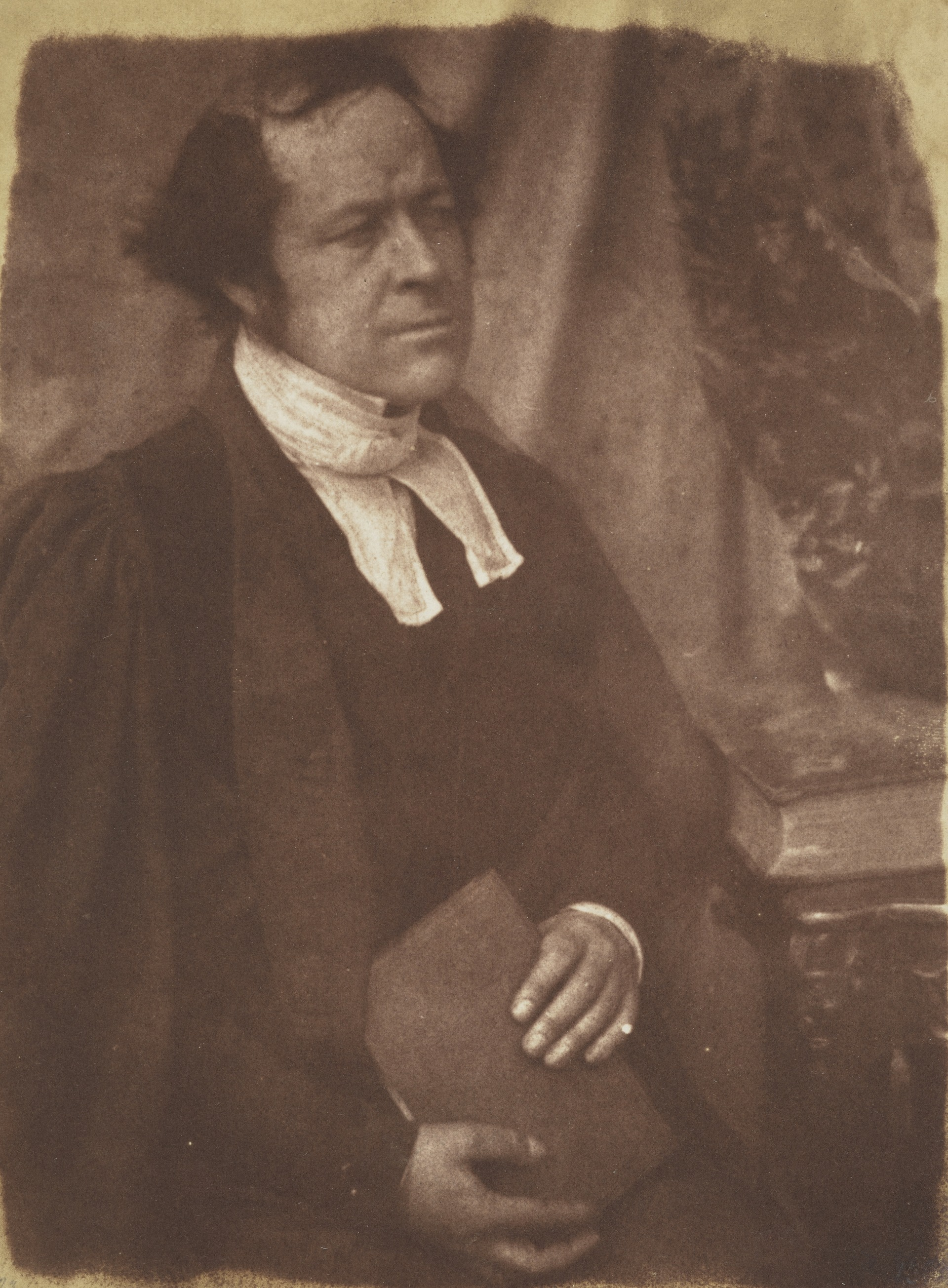
James Gibson by Hill & Adamson

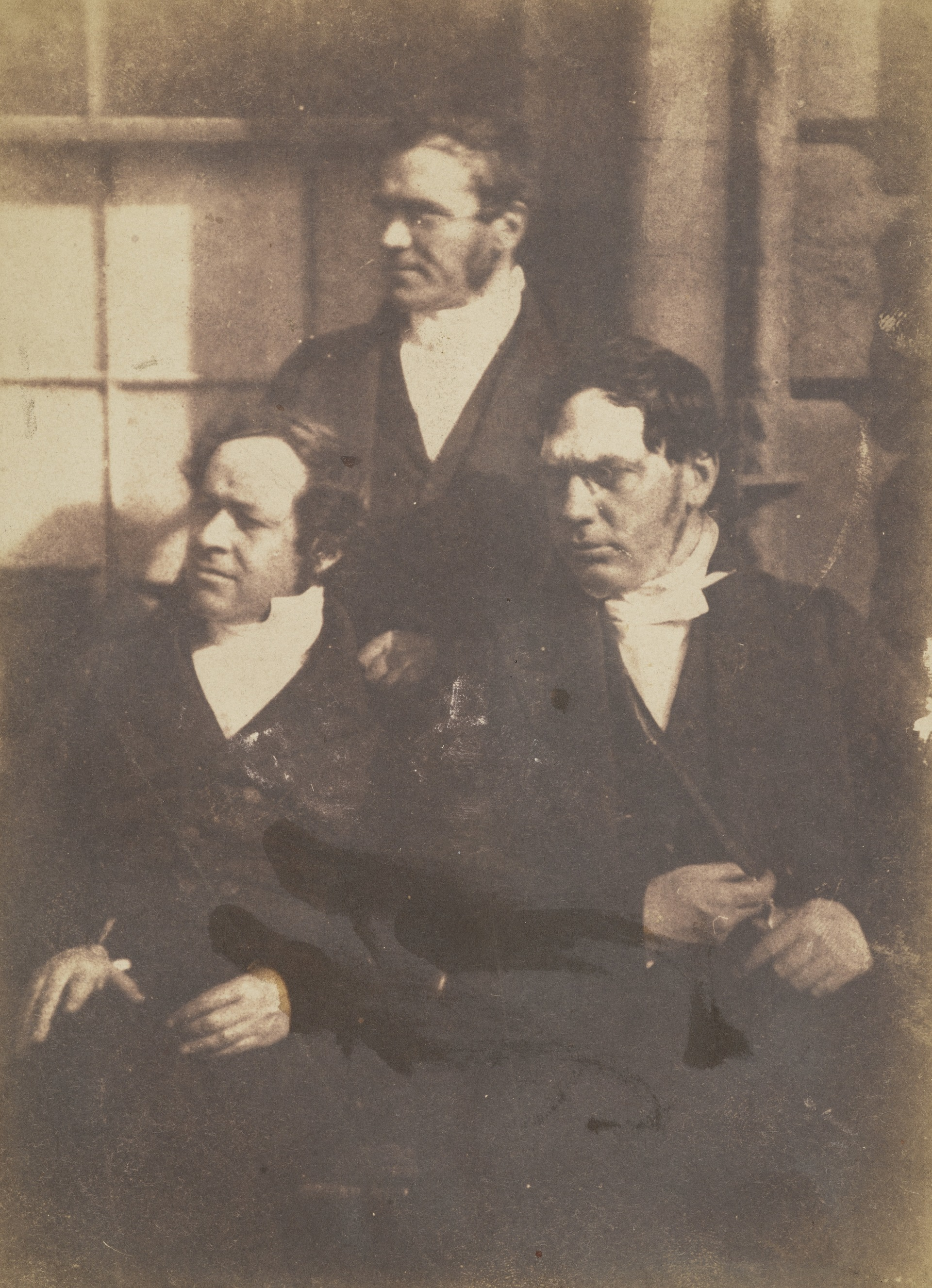
James Gibson "unknown man" and David King

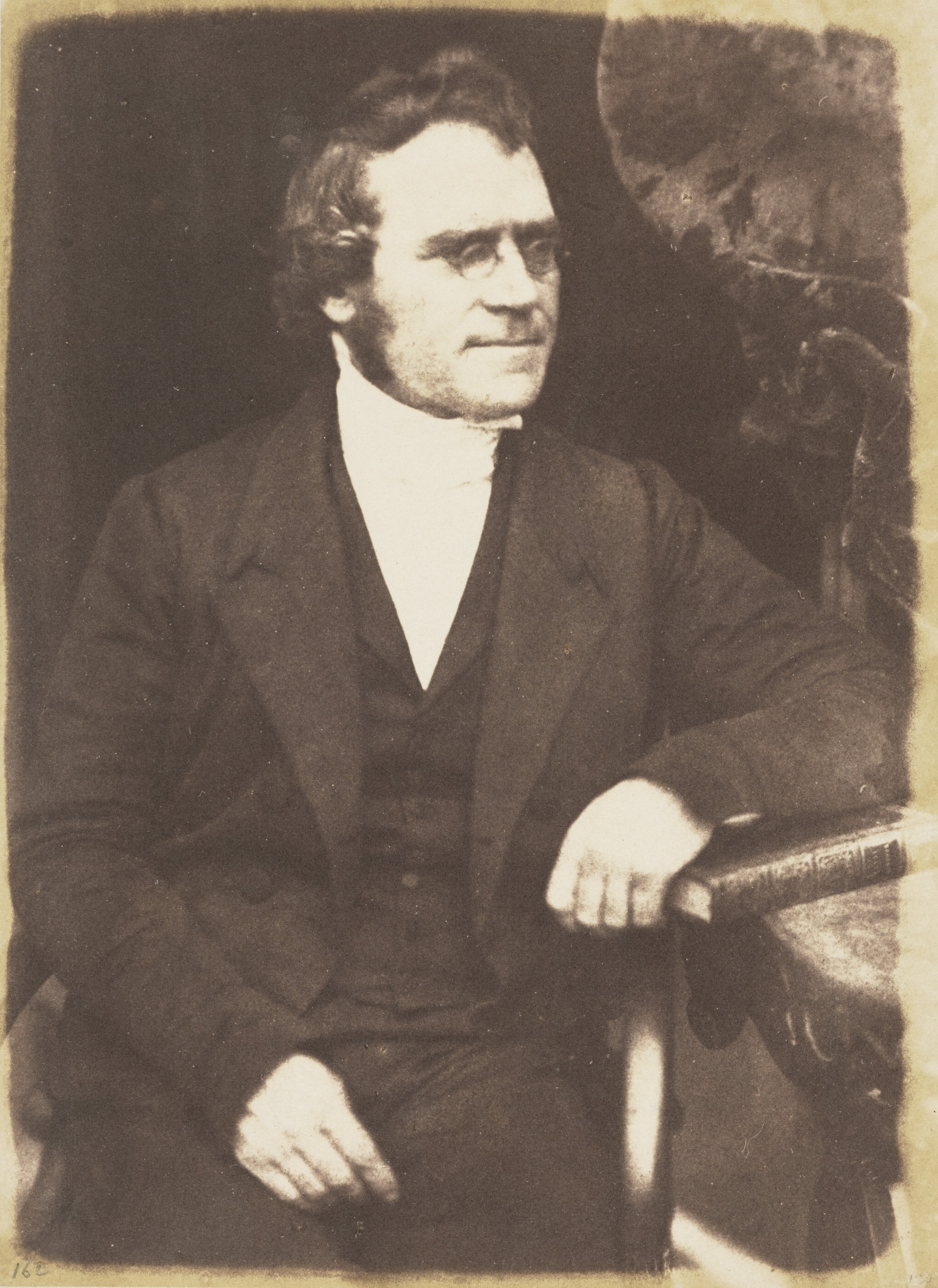
Andrew King of St Stephen's, Glasgow. He was later Professor of Theology at the Presbyterian College, Halifax, Nova Scotia

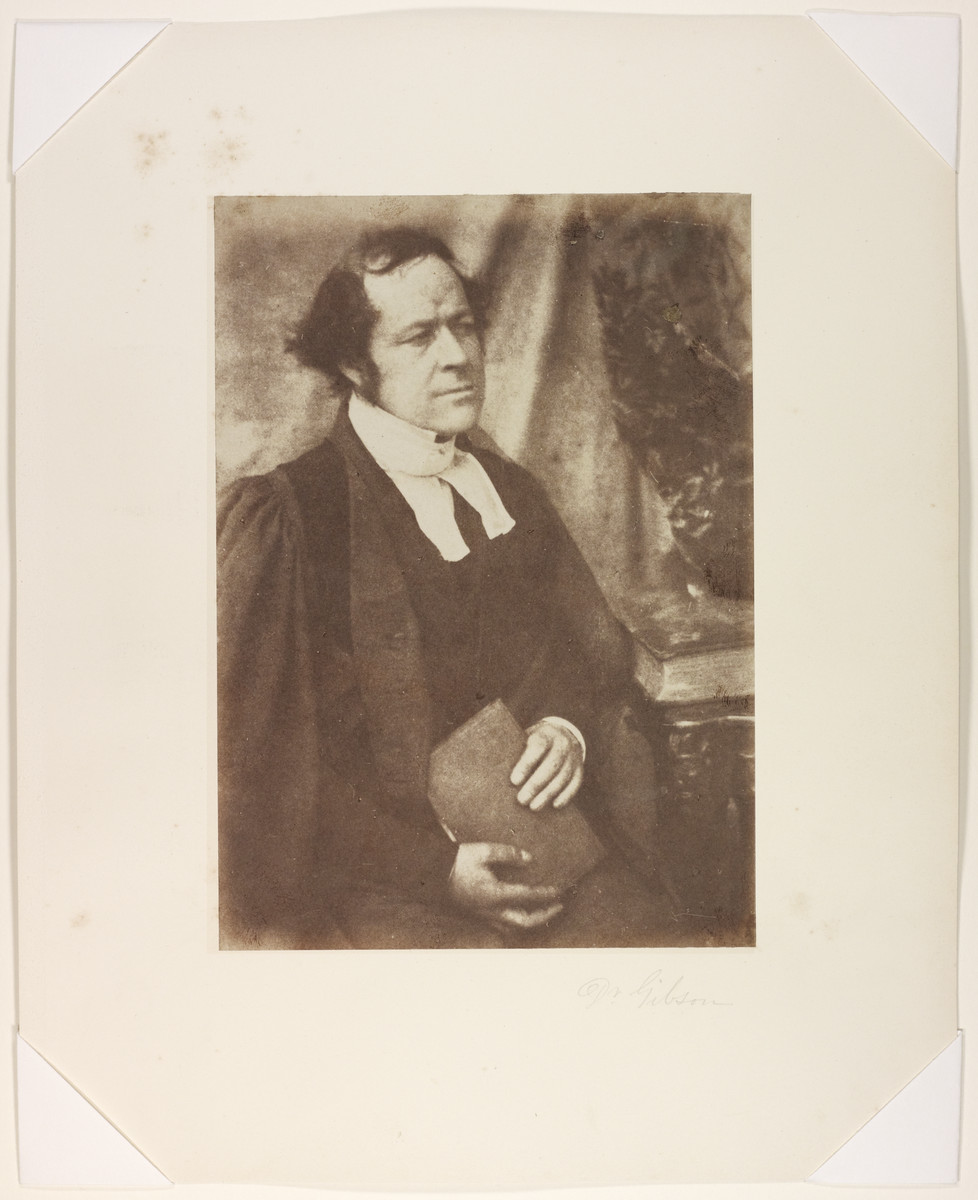
Rev James Gibson with signature

James Gibson (31 January 1799 – 2 November 1871) was a Church of Scotland and Free Church minister. He worked in Glasgow. He engaged in the Voluntary Controversy on the side of the Establishment. He edited the Church of Scotland Magazine, from 1834 to 1837. Kingston church in Glasgow was built for him by William Campbell and other anti-voluntaries, in 1839. He joined the Free Church at the Disruption, in 1843. On the endowment of Glasgow Theological College by Dr. Clark of Wester Moffat, Dr. Gibson was nominated Professor of Church History and Systematic Theology. He offended a portion of his students by the expression of views on moral inability consequent on the Fall. He was an author, publishing "Present Truths in Theology", and many pamphlets and sermons on theological topics which were current at the time.

== Early life and education ==
James Gibson was a Free church polemic, was born at Crieff, Perthshire, on 31 January 1799. He was the fourth son of Robert Gibson, who was a carrier from Crieff. His mother was Isabella Kemp. He entered the university of Glasgow in his twelfth year. He graduated with an M.A. in 1817. Towards the close of his preparatory course he became tutor in a Lanarkshire family, and in 1820 was licensed to preach by the presbytery of Hamilton. He afterwards accepted a situation as tutor in a Roxburghshire family, near Jedburgh, where he remained more than three years. In 1825 he became travelling companion to Captain Elliot, a cousin to the Earl of Minto. They went to Portugal and resided a considerable time in Lisbon.

== Church of Scotland ministry ==
Returning to Glasgow, Gibson was appointed assistant to the Rev. Mr. Steel, of the West Church, Greenock. After two years of work he made another continental tour with a pupil, receiving a testimonial from the Greenock congregation on his departure. In these tours he specially studied the moral and religious condition of the countries visited. Gibson was afterwards appointed assistant to Dr. Lockhart in the college parish, at Blackfriars, Glasgow, and received ordination as a minister in 1835. He was distinguished for accurate scholarship, a well cultivated mind, and sincere piety, but was not an attractive or effective preacher. He was drawn into the Voluntary Controversy as a defender of church establishments. He argued that the errors supposed to be due to the action of the Emperor Constantine (who established Christianity in Roman society) had existed at an earlier date. He became editor of the ‘Church of Scotland Magazine’ in 1834, an office which he held for three years. Some influential members of the church placed at his disposal about £2,000 which might either be accepted as a gift or devoted to the purpose of building a church for him. A church was accordingly built in the suburb of Kingston, into which he was inducted on 13 June 1839.

== Free Church ministry ==
When the Disruption came in 1843, when Gibson joined the Free church, and on the Sunday following he was interdicted from entering his own church. A place of worship in connection with the Free church was built for him in the same locality. For some years he acted as clerk to the Glasgow free presbytery. In 1855, having a promise of £30,000. from Dr. Clark of Wester Moffat, with whom Gibson was on friendly terms, the general assembly of the Free church resolved to erect a theological college in Glasgow, and next year (1856) Gibson was elected professor of systematic theology and church history. He was awarded a D.D. by Glasgow University in 1862. He was conspicuous as a debater in the courts of the Free church, and strenuously opposed anything like innovation.

== Death and legacy ==
Gibson died on 2 November 1871. He was buried at the Glasgow Necropolis.

== Works ==
- The Marriage Affinity Question (Edinburgh, 1854)
- Principles of Bible Temperance (Glasgow, 1855)
- Present Truths in Theology (Glasgow, 1863)
- The Connection between the Decalogue and New Testament Morality (Glasgow, 1865)
- The Public Worship of God : its Authority and Modes (Glasgow, 1869)
- Editor of the Church of Scotland Magazine (1834-7), and of The Scottish Protestant, i., ii. (Glasgow, 1852)
- volumes of lectures against infidelity, popery, and voluntaryism

MAN'S ABILITY : With its Relation to Gospel Doctrine, and Moral Responsibility, Scripturally considered . By the Rev. JAMES GIBSON, A.M., Glasgow Free Church Monthly, January 1872

== Family ==
He married on 25 June 1839, Elizabeth, daughter of John Campbell, minister of Tolbooth Parish, Edinburgh, and had issue —

- John Campbell Gibson, D.D., born 1853, missionary at Swatow, China, Moderator of the Presbyterian Church of England 1909, died at Glasgow 25 November 1919
- Jane Kinnear (married 12 January 1865, James M'Naught, minister of Abbotsford).
- James
