= Robert Gibson =

Robert Gibson may refer to:

== Government and politics ==
- Robert Gibson, Lord Gibson (1886–1965), British Labour Party politician, MP
- Robert Gibson (Ontario politician) (1932–1966), Canadian politician
- Rob Gibson (born 1945), Scottish SNP politician
- Robert Murray Gibson (1869–1949), U.S. federal judge and baseball player

== Religion ==
- Robert Atkinson Gibson (1846–1919), American bishop
- Robert W. Gibson (1854–1927), English-American ecclesiastical architect active in New York City
- Robert F. Gibson Jr. (1906–1990), bishop of Virginia in the Episcopal Church

== Sports ==
- Robert Gibson (wrestler) (born 1958), American wrestler
- Robert Gibson (rower) (born 1986), Canadian rower
- Robert Gibson (cricketer, born 1801) (1801–1???), English cricketer
- Robert Gibson (cricketer, born 1821) (1821–1875), English cricketer
- Robert Gibson (cricketer, born 1994), English cricketer
- Robert Murray Gibson (1869–1949), U.S. federal judge and baseball player

== Others ==
- Robert Gibson (businessman) (1863–1934), Australian businessman
- Robert L. Gibson (born 1946), American naval captain and NASA astronaut
- Robert Gibson (engineer) (1928–2008), British geotechnical engineer

== See also ==
- Bob Gibson (disambiguation)
