= Robin Gibson =

Robin Gibson may refer to:

- Robin Gibson (architect) (1930–2014), Australian architect
- Robin Gibson (footballer) (born 1979), English footballer
- Robin Warwick Gibson (1944–2010), British gallery curator and art historian
