= Paul Gibson =

Paul Gibson may refer to:

- Paul Gibson (broadcaster) (died 1965), former program host for WBBM (AM) Radio in Chicago
- Paul Gibson (wide receiver) (1948–1975), wide receiver in the National Football League
- Paul Gibson (end) (1924–1999), American football end
- Paul Gibson (baseball) (born 1960), former Major League Baseball pitcher
- Paul Gibson (footballer) (born 1976), English football goalkeeper who most notably played for Manchester United
- Paul Gibson (politician) (born 1944), Australian politician and rugby league footballer of the 1960s and 1970s
- Paul Gibson Jr. (1927–2014), American airline executive and New York City deputy mayor

== See also ==
- Gibson The Paul, an electric guitar made by Gibson
