= Patrick Gibson =

Patrick Gibson may refer to:

- Pat Gibson (born 1963), Irish quizzer
- Patrick Gibson (artist) (1782–1829), Scottish landscape-painter and writer on art
- Patrick Gibson, Baron Gibson (1916–2004), British businessman in the publishing industry
- Patrick Gibson (actor) (born 1995), Irish actor
- Pat Gibson (rugby league) (born 1981), Australian rugby league player
