= Reginald W. Gibson =

American judge (1927–2018)

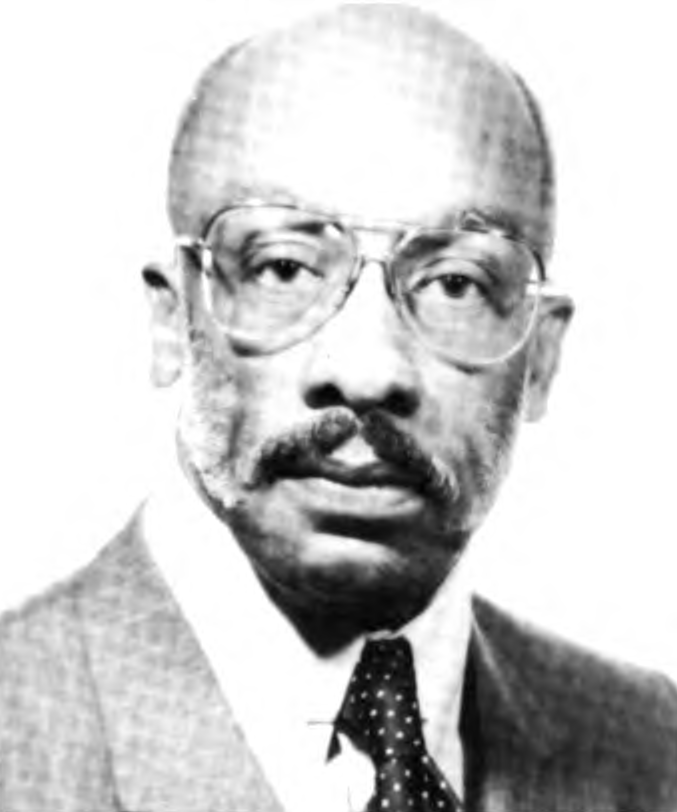

Senior Judge of the United States Court of Federal Claims
- In office August 15, 1995 – December 9, 2018

Judge of the United States Court of Federal Claims
- In office December 10, 1982 – August 15, 1995
- Appointed by: operation of law
- Preceded by: seat established
- Succeeded by: Lawrence Baskir

Personal details
- Born: July 31, 1927 Lynchburg, Virginia, U.S.
- Died: December 8, 2018 (aged 91)
- Education: Virginia Union University (BA); Howard University (JD)

Reginald W. Gibson (July 31, 1927 – December 8, 2018) was a judge of the United States Court of Federal Claims from 1982 to 1995.

Born in Lynchburg, Virginia to McCoy and Julia Gibson, Gibson was educated in the public schools of Washington, D.C., and served in the U.S. Army in the aftermath of World War II, from 1946 to 1947. He then received a Bachelor of Science from Virginia Union University in 1953, also attending the Wharton School of the University of Pennsylvania in 1952 and 1953, and received a Bachelor of Laws from Howard University School of Law in 1956. He was an agent of the Internal Revenue Service, in the United States Department of the Treasury from 1957 to 1961, and then a trial attorney in the Tax Division of the United States Department of Justice from 1961 to 1971. He was a senior and later general tax attorney for the International Harvester Company in Chicago, Illinois, from 1971 to 1982.

== Claims court service ==
On October 1, 1982, Gibson was nominated by President Ronald Reagan to a new seat on the United States Claims Court authorized by 96 Stat. 27. He was confirmed by the United States Senate on December 10, 1982, and received his commission the same day, entering on duty December 15, 1982. He assumed senior status on August 15, 1995. He died on December 8, 2018.

== Personal life ==
Gibson had a son, Reginald S. Gibson, Jr.
