= H. Lou Gibson =

British-born American medical photographer

Henry Louis Gibson (1906–1992) was a British-born American pioneering medical photographer. He was born in Truro, Cornwall, England, United Kingdom and died in Rochester, New York, United States.

== Career ==
Gibson was for many years editor and consultant in medical, biological, scientific, and technical photography for the Eastman Kodak Company. He received his B.Sc. degree in physics from the University of Illinois. He was a president of the Biological Photographic Association (renamed the Biocommunications Association). He was made a Fellow of the association and in 1960 received its highest honor, the Louis Schmidt Award for his outstanding contribution to scientific photography.

He was an expert in medical uses of infrared radiation and had pioneered its use in detecting breast cancer.

== Publications ==
- The Photography of Patients (1952)
- Copying and Duplicating Medical Subjects and Radiographs (1953)
- Perfecting your Enlarging (1961) Chilton Co., Book Division
- Light through the Lens (1968) Christopher Pub. House
- Close-up Photography and Photomacrography (1969) Eastman Kodak Co., Professional and Finishing Markets Division
- Stars through the Apple Tree (1972) Christopher Pub. House
- Medical Photography; clinical-ultraviolet-infrared (1973) Eastman Kodak Co., Professional and Finishing Markets Division
- Photography by Infrared (1978), Wiley
- The Biological Photographic Association, its Half Century (1981), Biological Photographic Association, Inc.

== See also ==
- Medical imaging
