= Walter Maxwell Gibson =

American chemist (1930–2009)

- Born: 1930; Enoch, Utah, U.S.
- Died: 2009 (aged 78–79)
- Education: Southern Utah University; University of Utah; University of California, Berkeley (PhD)
- Occupation: Chemist
- Scientific career
- Fields: Chemistry

Walter Maxwell Gibson (1930–2009) was an American chemist.

Gibson was born in Enoch, Utah. He studied at Southern Utah University and the University of Utah. He received his Ph.D. from the University of California, Berkeley, where he studied under Glenn T. Seaborg. He worked at Bell Labs, where he did studies in ion channeling. He later was head of the physics department and dean of graduate studies at the University at Albany. He would be designated the university's Distinguished Service Professor.

Gibson was a Latter-day Saint. He was for a time bishop of the Albany Ward in New York.

Southern Utah University named its college of Science and Engineering after Gibson. This was in part the result of a $4 million donation by his family in 2012.

Among other works Gibson wrote a book on the radiochemistry of lead.

== Sources ==
- Out obituary of Gibson
- University at Albany death announcement
