= John Gibson =

John Gibson may refer to:

== Sports ==
- John Gibson (Nottingham cricketer), English cricketer
- John Gibson (cricketer, born 1833) (1833–1892), English priest and cricketer
- John Gibson (footballer, born 1967), Scottish football player
- John Gibson (footballer, born 1989), footballer who plays for Dundee
- John Gibson (ice hockey, born 1959) (1959–2020), Canadian and ex-NHL hockey player, winner of the 1979–1980 Governor's Trophy
- John Gibson (ice hockey, born 1993), American ice hockey goaltender
- John Gibson (motorcyclist), 1956 Daytona 200 winner
- Johnny Gibson (John Anthony Gibson, 1905–2006), American 400 meter hurdles world record holder
- Johnny Gibson (footballer) (born 1950), Scottish footballer (Partick Thistle)

== Law and politics ==
- John Arthur Gibson (1850–1912), Six Nations Reserve chief of the Haudenosaunee (Iroquois)
- John Gibson (mayor), mayor of Philadelphia, 1771–1773
- John Gibson (police officer) (1956–1998), U.S. Capitol police officer killed in the line of duty 1998
- John Bannister Gibson (1780–1853), Pennsylvania attorney and judge
- John C. Gibson (born 1934), American Republican politician from New Jersey
- John R. Gibson (1925–2014), American judge
- John S. Gibson Jr. (1902–1987), Los Angeles City Councilman, 1981–1982
- John S. Gibson (1893–1960), U.S. Representative from Georgia
- John George Gibson (1846–1923), Irish lawyer and Conservative politician
- John Lambert Gibson (1906–1986), independent member of the Canadian House of Commons
- Sir John Morison Gibson (1842–1929), Attorney-General and Lieutenant Governor of Ontario
- John Gibson (Australian politician) (1857–1941), member of the Tasmanian House of Assembly
- John Gibson (New Zealand lawyer) (1936–2009), cricket selector and Queen's Counsel

== Entertainment ==
- John Gibson (actor, born 1905) (1905–1971), American film, radio and television actor
- John Gibson (actor, born 1948) (1948–1986), American actor, model, and dancer

== Others ==
- John Gibson (architect) (1817–1892), British architect
- John Gibson (cartographer) (1750–1792), English cartographer and engraver
- Sir John Gibson (editor and journalist) (1841–1915), Anglo-Welsh journalist and proprietor of The Cambrian News
- John Gibson (political commentator) (born 1946), American talk radio host for Fox News Radio
- John Gibson (sculptor) (1790–1866), British sculptor
- John Gibson (American soldier) (1740–1822), American soldier, Territorial Secretary and acting governor of Indiana Territory, namesake of Gibson County, Indiana
- John Gibson (RAF officer) (1916–2000), English aviator and WWII air ace
- John Douglas Gibson (1924–1984), Australian amateur ornithologist
- John H. Gibson, American soldier of the Natchez Expedition and the Creek War, namesake of Gibson County, Tennessee
- John H. Gibson (born 1959), American (Texas) businessman and Assistant Secretary of the Air Force
- John T. Gibson (1878–1937), American businessman and theatre manager and producer of black artists in Philadelphia
- Sir John Gibson (British Army officer) (c. 1637–1717), British soldier and politician
- Sir John Watson Gibson (1885–1947), English civil engineer
- John Gibson (songwriter) (fl. 1812), English poet and songwriter
- John Gibson (priest), English priest
- John Gibson, former CEO of Tripwire Interactive
- John-Michael Gibson, American rapper known professionally as Cash Out

== See also ==
- Jack Gibson (disambiguation)
- Jon Gibson (disambiguation)
