= Jack Gibson =

Jack Gibson may refer to:

- Jack Gibson (rugby league) (1929–2008), Australian player and coach
- Jack Stanley Gibson (1909–2005), Irish physician
- Jack Gibson (ice hockey, born 1880) (1880–1955), ice hockey player and executive
- Jack Gibson (ice hockey, born 1948), ice hockey player
- Jack Gibson, musician with American band Exodus
- Jack Gibson (schoolmaster) (1908–1994), English schoolmaster, scholar, academic and British Himalayan mountaineer
- John Lambert Gibson (1906–1986), independent member of the Canadian House of Commons
- Joseph Deighton Gibson Jr. (1920–2001), actor, disc jockey, MC, father of Black Appeal radio, Jack the Rapper Radio Convention

== See also ==
- John Gibson
