= 1934 New Year Honours =

British royal recognitions

The 1934 New Year Honours were appointments by King George V to various orders and honours to reward and highlight good works by citizens of the United Kingdom and British Empire. They were announced on 29 December 1933.

The recipients of honours are displayed here as they were styled before their new honour, and arranged by honour, with classes (Knight, Knight Grand Cross, etc.) and then divisions (Military, Civil, etc.) as appropriate.

== United Kingdom and British Empire ==
=== Baron ===
- The Right Honourable Sir Evelyn Cecil CBE Member of Parliament for East Hertfordshire, 1898–1900; for Aston Manor, 1900-1918 and for the Aston Division, 1918–1929. Chairman or Member of many Committees and Commissions. For political and public services.
- Godfrey Elton Fellow of Queen's College, Oxford. Member of the Executive of the National Labour Committee. For political and public services.
- Sir Bertram Godfray Falle Bt MP Member of Parliament for Portsmouth, 1910–1918, and for Portsmouth North since 1918. For political and public services.
- Sir William Richard Morris Bt OBE DCL Chairman of Morris Motors, Ltd., and other Companies. For public and philanthropic services.
- Sir (George) Douglas Cochrane Newton KBE JP DL MP Member of Parliament for Cambridge Borough since March, 1922. Chairman since 1929 of the Agricultural Committee in the House of Commons. For political and public services.

=== Privy Councillor ===
The King appointed the following to His Majesty's Most Honourable Privy Council:

- His Highness Aga Sultan Sir Mahomed Shah, Aga Khan GCSI GCIE GCVO Head of the Ismaili Mahomedans.
- Sir Tej Bahadur Sapru KCSI Advocate of the High Court, Allahabad.
- Edward Montagu Cavendish, Lord Stanley MC JP DL MP Member of Parliament for the Abercromby Division, 1917–18, and for the Fylde Division since 1922. A Lord Commissioner of the Treasury, 1924–27. Parliamentary and Financial Secretary to the Admiralty since 1931.

=== Baronetcies ===
- Major Ralph George Campbell Glyn MC DL MP Member of Parliament for the Clackmannan and Eastern Division, 1918–22, and for the Abingdon Division since 1924. For political and public services.
- Osmond Elim d'Avigdor Goldsmid JP DL For political and public services in the County of Kent.
- Sir William McLintock CBE CVO Senior Partner, Thomson McLintock & Co., Chartered Accountants. For valuable services to Government Departments.
- Percy John Pybus CBE MIEE MP Member of Parliament for the Harwich Division since 1929. Minister of Transport, 1931–33. For political and public services.

=== Knight Bachelor ===
- John Stanhope Arkwright JP DL Chief Steward of the City of Hereford. Author of the hymn "O Valiant Hearts."
- Commander Edgar Theophilus Britten RD RNR (retd.). Master of the R.M.S. Berengaria.
- Sydney Carlyle Cockerell Director of the Fitzwilliam Museum, Cambridge.
- Harry Cousins JP Registrar of the County Court of Cardiff and Barry and of the District Registry of the High Court at Cardiff.
- Ernest Arthur Eborall CBE Chief Inspector of Taxes, Board of Inland Revenue.
- Charles Edward FitzRoy, Solicitor to the Board of Customs and Excise.
- Cedric Webster Hardwicke, Actor.
- David Allan Hay OBE JP President of the Scottish Unionist Association, 1932–33. For political and public services in Scotland.
- Robert Ernest Herdman JP DL Chairman of the Belfast Harbour Commissioners.
- William Campbell Johnston WS JP Deputy-Keeper of the Signet.
- Alderman Thomas Keens DL Member of Parliament for the Aylesbury Division, 1923–24. For political and public services.
- Lieutenant-Colonel Russell James Kerr JP DL Chairman, Gloucester Quarter Sessions and a former chairman, Gloucestershire County Council. For public services.
- Kenneth Lee Chairman of Tootal Broadhurst Lee, Co., Ltd., of Manchester, Chairman of the Industrial Grants Committee, Department of (Scientific and Industrial Research. A member of many Government Committees.
- William Kidston McClure CBE Press Officer, British Embassy, Rome.
- Frederic Rowland Mallett CM LRCP For political and public services in Bolton, Lancashire.
- Alec Martin, Honorary Secretary of the National Art Collections Fund.
- Miles Ewart Mitchell, Alderman and ex-Lord Mayor of Manchester. Chairman of the Housing Committee of the Association of Municipal Corporations. An active supporter of the present slum clearance campaign.
- Ralph George Elphinstone Mortimer OBE JP Chairman of Wansbeck Conservative Association since 1920. For political and public services in Northumberland.
- Robert Muir DCL FRS FRCPE FFPS Professor of Pathology, University of Glasgow.
- William Nicholson. For political and public services in Leeds.
- Colonel John Ernest Perring JP DL For political and public services in London.
- Alderman John Sykes Quarmby JP Traffic Commissioner, Yorkshire Area.
- Alderman Sydney Walter Robinson JP Member of Parliament for Chelmsford, 1923–24. For political and public services in Essex.
- Reginald Percy Pfeiffer Rowe, chairman, since 1900, of the Improved Tenements Association. Founder and Honorary Treasurer of the Sadlers Wells Fund.
- Rear-Admiral Murray Fraser Sueter CB MP Member of Parliament for Hertford since 1921. A pioneer of British aviation. For political and public services.
- Luke Thompson MP Member of Parliament for Sunderland, 1932–29, and since 1931. For political and public services.
- Robert John Webber JP For political and public services in Cardiff.
- Charles Theodore Hagberg Wright Secretary and Librarian of the London Library.

Colonies, Protectorates, etc.

- Captain Gilbert Joseph Cullen Dyett CMG Federal President of the Returned Sailors and Soldiers Imperial League of Australia. For services to the Commonwealth of Australia.
- Geoffrey Evans CIE Principal, Imperial College of Tropical Agriculture, Trinidad.
- Robert William Lyall Grant Chief Justice, Jamaica.
- Selwyn MacGregor Grier CMG Colonial Secretary, Colony of Trinidad and Tobago.
- James Trevilly Grose, General Manager of the National Bank of New Zealand. For public services in the Dominion of New Zealand.
- George Henry Johnson, President of the Legislative Council and Unofficial Member of the Executive Council of the Bahama Islands.
- Frederick Duncan McMaster. For public services to the Commonwealth of Australia.
- Colonel Charles Edward Merrett CBE VD President and Trustee of the Royal Agricultural Society, State of Victoria.
- The Honourable Langer Meade Loftus Owen CBE KC formerly Justice of the Supreme Court, New South Wales, lately Royal Commissioner in Enquiry into Performing Rights in the Commonwealth of Australia.
- Philip Pullicino Treasury Counsel and Public Prosecutor, Malta.
- Major-General William Livingstone Hatchwell Sinclair-Burgess CB CMG DSO ADC General Officer Commanding Military Forces, Dominion of New Zealand.
- The Honourable Joseph-Mathias Tellier, Chief Justice of the province of Quebec, Dominion of Canada.

British India

- U Ba, K.S.M., Member of the Executive Council of the Governor of Burma.
- William Thomas Webb Baker, Indian Civil Service, lately Puisne Judge of the High Court of Judicature at Bombay.
- Rao Bahadur Mr. Justice Chittoor Vaithilinga Ayyar Anantakrishna Ayyar Avargal, Puisne Judge of the High Court of Judicature at Fort St. George, Madras.
- Khan Bahadur Muhammad Abdur Rahman, Vice-Chancellor of the University of Delhi.
- Hugh Augustus Macnish Hannay VD Agent, East Indian Railway, Bengal.
- Horace Williamson CIE MBE Indian Police, Director, Intelligence Bureau, Home Department, Government of India.
- Sardar Bahadur Sardar Jawahir Singh CIE MLA of Mustafabad, Ambala, Punjab.
- Raymond Patrick Hadow CIE Indian Service of Engineers, Chief Engineer, Irrigation Branch, Punjab.
- Rai Bahadur Badridas Goenka CIE MLC Merchant, Bengal.
- Sahibzada Abdussamad Khan CIE Chief Minister, Rampur State, United Provinces.
- Behari Lai Dhingra CIE MRCS Chief Minister, Jind State, Punjab States.
- M. R. Ry. Diwan Bahadur, Mysore Nanjundiah Krishna Rao, First Member of Council, Mysore State.
- Jehangir Bomanji Bomon-Behram, Solicitor, Bombay.

=== The Most Noble Order of the Garter ===
==== Knight of the Most Noble Order of the Garter (KG) ====
- The Right Honourable James Richard, Earl Stanhope DSO MC DL

=== The Most Honourable Order of the Bath ===
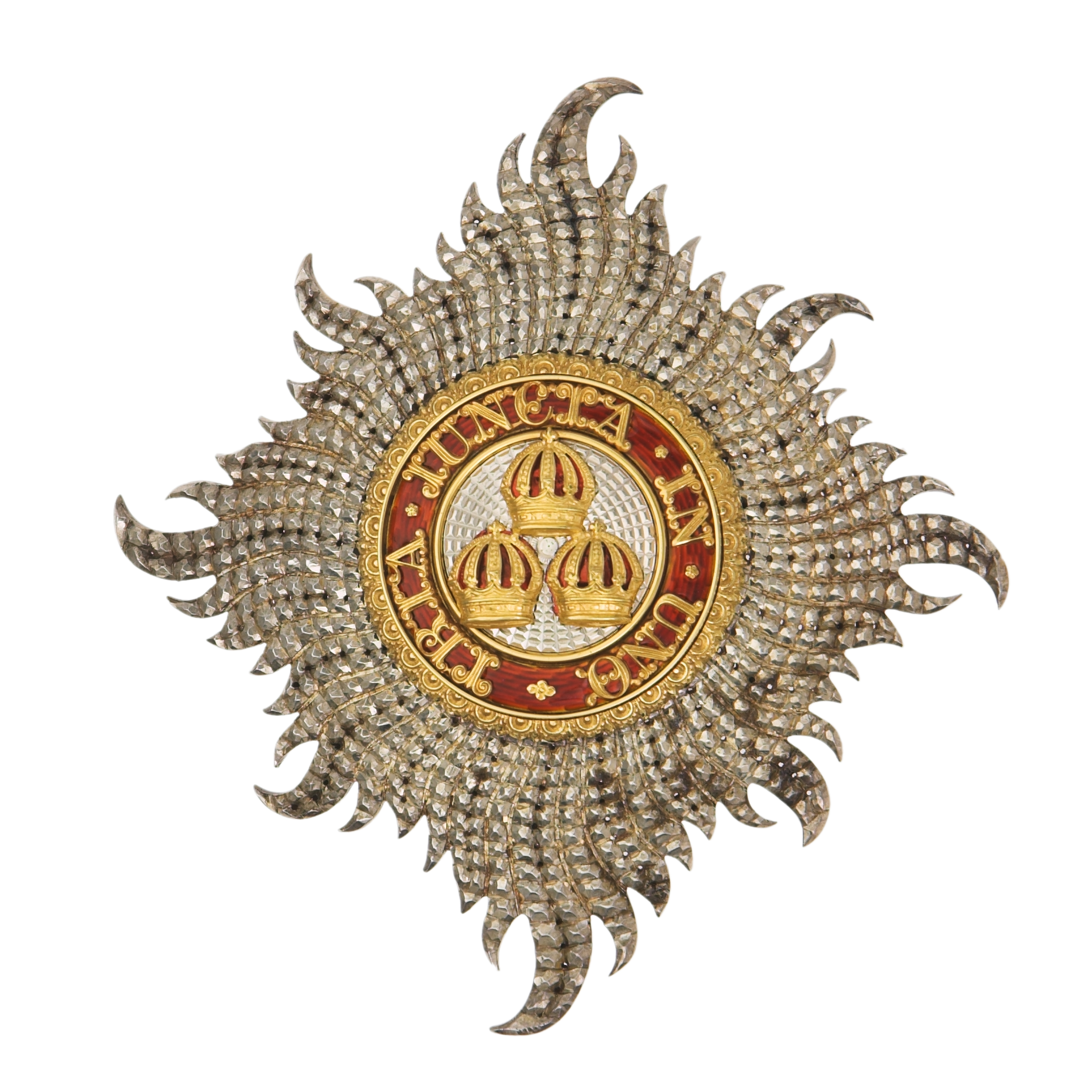
Civil star of the Knight Grand Cross of the Order of the Bath

==== Knight Grand Cross of the Order of the Bath (GCB) ====
Military Division
Royal Navy

- Admiral Sir Alfred Ernle Montacute Chatfield KCB KCMG CVO

Civil Division

- The Right Honourable Sir Horace George Montagu Rumbold Bt GCMG MVO His Majesty's Ambassador at Berlin, 1928–1933.
- The Right Honourable William Douglas, Baron Weir DL Managing Director of Messrs. G. & J. Weir, Limited, Glasgow.

==== Knight Commander of the Order of the Bath (KCB) ====
Military Division
Royal Navy

- Vice-Admiral Eric John Arthur Fullerton CB DSO
- Vice-Admiral the Honourable Reginald Aylmer Ranfurly Plunkett-Ernle-Erle-Drax CB DSO
- Vice-Admiral George Francis Hyde CVO CBE (Royal Australian Navy).

Army

- Lieutenant-General James Wilton O'Dowda CB CSI CMG Colonel, The Queen's Own Royal West Kent Regiment. Half-Pay List.
- Lieutenant-General Walter Mervyn St. George Kirke CB CMG DSO (late Royal Artillery), General Officer Commanding-in-Chief, Western Command.

Civil Division

- Colonel John Brown CB CBE DSO TD DL Territorial Army.
- Sir Ralph Endersby Harwood KCVO CB CBE Deputy Treasurer to His Majesty The King.

==== Companion of the Order of the Bath (CB) ====
Military Division
Royal Navy

- Rear Admiral Arthur Edward Frederick Bedford.
- Rear-Admiral the Honourable Sir Alexander Robert Maule Ramsay KCVO DSO
- Rear-Admiral Gerald Charles Dickens CMG
- Rear-Admiral Cecil Ponsonby Talbot DSO

Army

- Major-General Henry Charles Rupert Hime DSO (late Royal Army Medical Corps), Honorary Physician to The King, Deputy-Director of Medical Services, Southern Command.
- The Reverend Ernest Hayford Thorold CBE Honorary Chaplain to The King, Chaplain-General to the Forces, Chaplain, Tower of London.
- Major-General Kenneth Gray Buchanan CMG DSO (late The Seaforth Highlanders (Rossshire Buffs, The Duke of Albany's)). Half-Pay List.
- Major-General Russell Mortimer Luckock CMG DSO (late The King's Own Royal Regiment (Lancaster)). Half-Pay List.
- Major-General Alan John Hunter CMG DSO MC (late The King's Royal Rifle Corps). Half-Pay List.
- Colonel (Honorary Brigadier General) Alexander Brown Robertson CMG DSO (late The Queen's Own Cameron Highlanders). Retired pay.
- Colonel (temporary Brigadier) Francis Mackenzie Murray, Indian Army, Director of Ordnance Services, India.
- Colonel Neil Charles Bannatyne CIE Indian Army, Unemployed List, late Commander, 1st (Abbottabad) Infantry Brigade, India.
- Colonel (temporary Brigadier) Frederick George Gillies OBE Indian Army, Commander, Ambala Brigade Area, India.
- Colonel (temporary Brigadier) Robert Heath Anderson CIE Indian Army, Commander, 3rd (Jhelum) Infantry Brigade, India.

Royal Air Force

- Group Captain Reginald John Bone CBE DSO

Civil Division

- Rear-Admiral Sidney Julius Meyrick.
- Paymaster Rear-Admiral Henry William Woodward.
- Lieutenant-Colonel Peter Strachan Nicoll CBE TD DL Chairman, Territorial Army Association of the County of the City of Dundee.
- Colonel Harry Olive OBE TD DL Territorial Army.
- Charles John ffoulkes OBE FSA Curator of the Tower Armouries since 1913. Until recently Curator and Secretary of the Imperial War Museum.
- Alan Bruce Maclachlan, Principal Assist. ant Secretary, Ministry of Health.
- Wilfrid Medd OBE Principal Assistant Secretary, Admiralty.
- Seward Pearce CBE Lately Assistant Director of Public Prosecutions.
- Frederic James Edward Raby, FSA Assistant Secretary, His Majesty's Office of Works and Public Buildings.

=== The Most Exalted Order of the Star of India ===
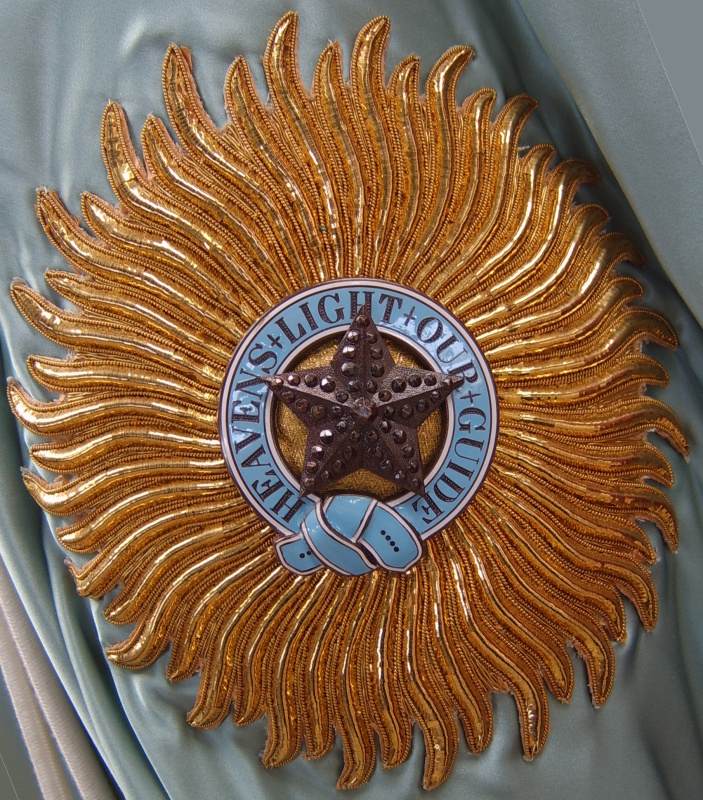
Star of a Knight Grand Commander of the Most Exalted Order of the Star of India.

==== Knight Grand Commander (GCSI) ====
- Lieutenant-Colonel the Right Honourable Sir Samuel John Gurney Hoare Bt GBE CMG MP Secretary of State for India.

==== Knight Commander (KCSI) ====
- His Highness Maharaja Chura Chand Singh CBE Maharaja of Manipur, Assam.
- Sir Edward Maynard Des Champs Chamier KCIE lately Legal Adviser and Solicitor to the Secretary of State for India.

==== Companion (CSI) ====
- William Hawthorne Lewis CIE Indian Civil Service, Reforms Commissioner, Government of India.
- Alan Hubert Lloyd CIE Indian Civil Service, First Member, Central Board of Revenue.
- Robert Niel Reid CIE Indian Civil Service, Chief Secretary to the Government of Bengal.
- Joseph Miles Clay CIE OBE Indian Civil Service, Chief Secretary to the Government of the United Provinces.
- Brigadier Robert Henry Thomas DSO lately Surveyor-General of India.
- Robert Benson Ewbank CIE Indian Civil Service, Secretary to the Government of Bombay, General and Educational Departments, Bombay.

=== The Most Distinguished Order of Saint Michael and Saint George ===
Star of the Order of Saint Michael and Saint George.

==== Knight Grand Cross of the Order of St Michael and St George (GCMG) ====
- Sir Bernard Henry Bourdillon KBE CMG Governor and Commander-in-Chief of the Uganda Protectorate.
- Brigadier-General Sir Joseph Aloysius Byrne KCMG KBE CB Governor and Commander-in-Chief of the Colony of Kenya.
- Sir Henry Getty Chilton KCMG His Majesty's Ambassador Extraordinary and Plenipotentiary at Buenos Aires.
- The Right Honourable Sir James Eric Drummond KCMG CB His Majesty's Ambassador Extraordinary and Plenipotentiary at Rome.
- The Right Honourable Lyman Poore Duff Chief Justice of Canada.
- Sir John Michael Higgins KCMG For public services to the Commonwealth of Australia.
- Sir Cecil William Hunter-Rodwell KCMG Governor and Commander-in-Chief of the Colony of Southern Rhodesia.
- George John Frederick Tomlinson CBE Assistant Under-Secretary of State, Colonial Office.
- Sir Hubert Winthrop Young CMG DSO Governor and Commander-in-Chief of the Nyasaland Protectorate.

==== Knight Commander of the Order of St Michael and St George (KCMG) ====
- Sir Charles John Howell Thomas KCB CMG Permanent Secretary to the Ministry of Agriculture and Fisheries.
- The Honourable Alexander Montagu George Cadogan CB CMG His Majesty's Envoy Extraordinary and Minister Plenipotentiary (Designate) to the Republic of China.
- Rowland Arthur Charles Sperling CB CMG His Majesty's Envoy Extraordinary and Minister Plenipotentiary at Helsingfors.

==== Companion of the Order of St Michael and St George (CMG) ====
- Professor Robert Edward Alexander, Director of Canterbury Agricultural College, Lincoln, near Christchurch, Dominion of New Zealand.
- Arthur Beauchesne KC Clerk of the House of Commons, Dominion of Canada.
- Robert Walker Breadner, Commissioner of Customs, Department of National Revenue, Dominion of Canada.
- Harry Percy Brown MBE MIEE Director-General, Postmaster-General's Department, Commonwealth of Australia.
- Captain Francis Marriott, Member of the House of Assembly, State of Tasmania.
- Thomas Mulvey KC lately Undersecretary of State and Deputy Registrar-General, Dominion of Canada.
- Hugh Howard Rowatt, lately Deputy Minister of the Interior, Dominion of Canada.
- John Webster, General Secretary of the Returned Sailors and Soldiers Imperial League of Australia. For services to the Commonwealth of Australia.
- Humphrey Edward Gibson Bartlett, lately Commissioner of Lands, Gold Coast.
- Hilary Rudolph Robert Blood, Colonial Secretary, Grenada, Windward Islands.
- Francis William Brett, Provincial Commissioner, Tanganyika Territory.
- The Honourable Charles Cecil Farquharson Dundas OBE Colonial Secretary, Bahamas.
- William Sumner Gibson, Officer of Class IA, Malayan Civil Service.
- Alwyn Sidney Haynes, British Adviser, Kelantan, Malay States.
- Alexander Holm CBE lately Director of Agriculture, Kenya.
- Gordon James Lethem, Secretary, Northern Provinces, Nigeria.
- Alfred Wallace Seymour, Colonial Secretary, Fiji.
- Arthur Robartes Wellington MRCS LRCP Director of Medical and Sanitary Services, Hong Kong.
- Major Eric Norman Spencer Crankshaw MBE Secretary, Government Hospitality Fund.
- Arthur Ronald Fraser MBE Assistant Director, Department of Overseas Trade.
- Major John Gilmour MC President of the International Quarantine Board at Alexandria.
- Godfrey Digby Napier Haggard OBE His Majesty's Consul-General at Paris.
- Edward Maurice Berkeley Ingram OBE Counsellor in His Majesty's Legation at Peking.
- Stanley Gordon Irving, Commercial Secretary (First Grade) in His Majesty's Embassy at Buenos Aires.
- Victor Alexander Louis Mallet, Acting Counsellor in His Majesty's Legation at Tehran.
- James Morgan, Counsellor (local rank) in His Majesty's Embassy at Angora.
- George Arthur Drostan Ogilvie-Forbes, Acting Counsellor in His Majesty's Embassy at Baghdad.
- Nigel Bruce Ronald, Assistant Private Secretary to His Majesty's Principal Secretary of State for Foreign Affairs.

=== Order of the Indian Empire ===
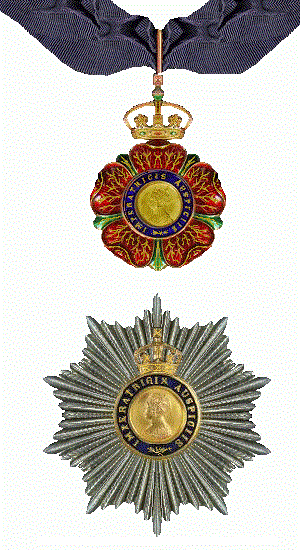
Riband, badge and star of the Knight Grand Commander of the Order of the Indian Empire

==== Knight Grand Commander (GCIE) ====
- His Highness Said-Ud-Daula Wazir-Ul-Mulk Nawab Hafiz Mohammad Saadat Ali Khan Bahadur, Saulat-i-Jang, Nawab of Tonk, Rajputana.

==== Knight Commander (KCIE) ====
- Hopetoun Gabriel Stokes CSI CIE Indian Civil Service, Member of the Executive Council of the Governor of Madras.
- Alexander Norman Ley Cater CIE of the Political Department, Agent to the Governor-General and Chief Commissioner in Baluchistan.
- Harry Alexander Fanshawe Lindsay CIE CBE Indian Civil Service, Trade Commissioner for India, London.
- Vernon Dawson CIE Secretary, Reforms Department, India Office.

==== Companion (CIE) ====
- Abraham Raisman, Indian Civil Service, Joint Secretary to the Government of India, Commerce Department.
- John Alexander Stewart MC Indian Civil Service, Commissioner, Irrawaddy Division, Burma.
- Kismet Leland Brewer Hamilton, Indian Civil Service, Commissioner, Chhattisgarh Division, Central Provinces.
- Henry Joseph Twynam, Indian Civil Service, Officiating Commissioner, Presidency Division, Bengal.
- Jagat Prasad, Indian Audit and Accounts Service, Accountant-General, Posts and Telegraphs.
- Colonel (temporary Brigadier) George Ambrose Hare, Indian Army, Director of Ordnance Factories arid Manufacture, Master-General of the Ordnance Branch, Army Headquarters, India.
- Benegal Narsing Rau, Indian Civil Service, Secretary, Legislative Department, Superintendent and Remembrancer of Legal Affairs, Administrator-General and Official Trustee, Assam.
- Lionel Hyde Greg, Indian Service of Engineers, Chief Engineer, Public Works Department, Madras.
- John Reginald Trevor Booth, Indian Civil Service, Senior Deputy Director-General, Posts and Telegraphs.
- Charles Carter Chitham, Indian Police, Inspector-General of Police, Central Provinces.
- Lionel Hewitt Colson, Indian Police, Commissioner of Police, Calcutta.
- Robert Edwin Russell, Indian Civil Service, Deputy Commissioner, Hazaribagh, Bihar and Orissa.
- Nicholas Fitzmaurice, China Consular Service, His Britannic Majesty's Consul-General at Kashgar.
- Arthur Cunningham Lothian, of the Political Department, Resident, Jaipur and the Western States of Rajputana.
- Major Geoffrey Lawrence Betham MC of the Political Department, lately Political Agent in Zhob, Baluchistan, and now Commissioner, Ajmer-Merwara.
- Rai Bahadur Diwan Gyan Nath, of the Political Department, President, Council of Regency, Nabha State, Punjab States.
- Major William Rupert Hay, of the Political Department, lately Political Agent, Dir, Swat and Chitrai, North-West Frontier Province, and now Counsellor of the British Legation at Kabul.
- Charles Edward Stuart Fairweather, Criminal Investigation Department, Bengal.
- Lieutenant-Colonel Alexander Dron Stewart, Indian Medical Service, Director, All-India, Institute of Hygiene and Public Health, Calcutta, Bengal.
- Lieutenant-Colonel Ram Nath Chopra (Cantab.), Indian Medical Service, Professor of Pharmacology, School of Tropical Medicine and Hygiene, Calcutta, Bengal.
- Major Richard Trevor Lawrence MC Indian Army, Private Secretary to His Excellency the Governor of the Punjab.
- William Dawson Croft, Private Secretary to the Secretary of State for India.
- Kenneth Grant Mitchell MICE Indian Service of Engineers, Road Engineer to the Government of India.
- Khan Bahadur Manekji Navorji Mehta MBE Merchant, Bombay.
- Khan Bahadur Shaikh Wahid-Uddin, Honorary. Magistrate, Meerut, United Provinces.

=== The Royal Victorian Order ===
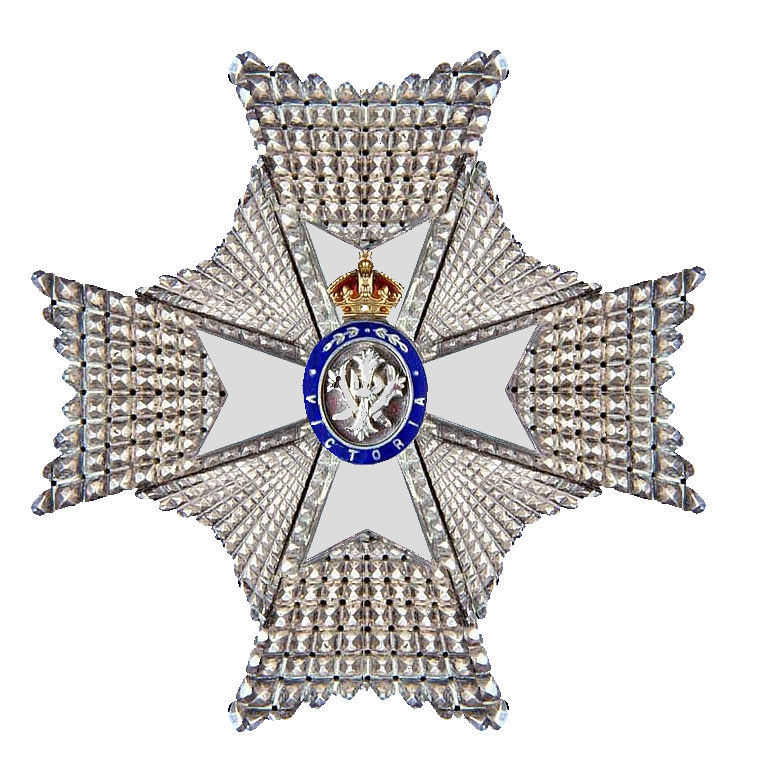
Insignia of a Knight / Dames Commander of the Royal Victorian Order

==== Knight Grand Cross of the Royal Victorian Order (GCVO) ====
- Henry George Charles, Earl of Harewood KG DSO TD
- William, Viscount Lewisham TD
- Colonel Sir Maurice Pascal Alers Hankey GCB GCMG

==== Knight Commander of the Royal Victorian Order (KCVO) ====
- Sir Richard Tetley Glazebrook KCB
- Colonel Sir William Tindall Lister KCMG
- Sir Cecil Harcourt-Smith CVO
- Major Edward Seymour CVO DSO OBE

==== Commander of the Royal Victorian Order (CVO) ====
- Sir Richard John Allison CBE
- Captain Henry Theodore Augustus Bosanquet RN (Retired).
- Lieutenant-Colonel George Reginald Lascelles OBE
- Frank Herbert Mitchell CBE MVO
- Louis Forbes Fergusson.

==== Member of the Royal Victorian Order, 4th class (MVO) ====
- The Reverend Leigh Hunter Nixon.
- Commander Alexander Guy Berners Wilson DSO RN
- Lieutenant-Commander Cyril Francis Tower RN (Dated 6 August 1933.)
- Albert Cox Legg MVO (Fifth Class).

==== Member of the Royal Victorian Order, 5th class (MVO) ====
- Major Herbert Brookhouse.
- George Alfred Titman.
- Guy Rosebery Primrose.
- William March.
- Ernest Edward Warner.

=== The Most Excellent Order of the British Empire ===
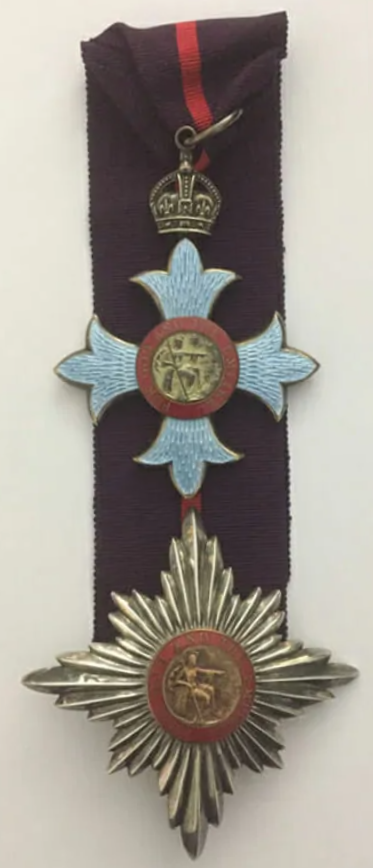
Knight Commander of the Order of the British Empire, insignia 1917–35

==== Knight Grand Cross of the Order of the British Empire (GBE) ====
Military Division

- Admiral Sir William Archibald Howard Kelly KCB CMG MVO

==== Knight Commander of the Order of the British Empire (KBE) ====
Military Division
Royal Navy

- Admiral Rudolf Miles Burmester CB CMG (Retired).

Civil Division

- Thomas Dalmahoy Barlow, Chairman of the Lancashire Industrial Development Council. Lately President of the Joint Committee of Cotton Trade Organisations and of the Manchester Chamber of Commerce.
- Neil James Kennedy-Cochran-Patrick MBE JP DL President of the Buteshire and North Ayrshire Unionist Association. Convener of the County of Ayr. For political and public services in Scotland.
- Thomas Williams Phillips CB CBE Deputy Secretary, Ministry of Labour.

Diplomatic Service and Overseas List

- Follett Holt, Chairman of Committee Representative of Holders of Frozen Peso Balances in the Argentine and Director of many companies operating in South America.

Colonies, Protectorates, etc.

- Major Arthur Salisbury Lawrance CMG DSO Commissioner and Commander-in-Chief of the Somaliland Protectorate.
- Francis Graeme Tyrrell CMG Chief Secretary, Ceylon.

==== Commander of the Order of the British Empire (CBE) ====
Military Division
Royal Navy

- Rear-Admiral Bernard William Murray Fairbairn OBE
- Engineer Rear-Admiral George Whittle Phillips.

Royal Air Force

- Group Captain William Hopton Anderson OBE Royal Australian Air Force.

Civil Division

- Henrietta Adler JP Vice-chairman of the Hackney Juvenile Advisory Committee and a member of the London Advisory Council for Juvenile Employment.
- Mildred Estelle Sybella Assheton JP For political and public services in Lancashire.
- John Secular Buchanan OBE FRAeS Deputy Director of Technical Development, Air Ministry.
- The Reverend Henry Carter. Joint Honorary-Secretary of the Council of Christian Ministers on Social Questions and of the Temperance Council of the Christian Churches of England and Wales.
- Maud Mary Chadburn Senior Surgeon, South London Hospital for Women. Surgeon to the Marie Curie Hospital.
- Hubert Warre Cornish, Senior Assistant Secretary, Scottish Education Department.
- Bailie William Dunn JP President of the East Fife Liberal Association. For political and public services.
- Ronald George Hatton, Director of the Horticultural Research Station, East Mailing, Kent.
- Thomas Hayes, Clerk to the Governors, St. Bartholomew's Hospital, since 1905.
- Richard Holland, Secretary to the National Society (Church of England Schools and Training Colleges).
- Arthur John Lees, Secretary of the Urban District Councils Association.
- William Henry Blyth Martin JP DL Town Clerk of Dundee.
- Charles Talbut Onions Joint Editor of the Oxford English Dictionary.
- Daniel Williams, Inspector General in Bankruptcy, Board of Trade.

Diplomatic Service and Overseas List

- Edward Basil Herbert Goodall MBE Provincial Commissioner, Northern Rhodesia.
- Jules Le Clésio, Elected Member of the Council of Government and Unofficial Member of the Executive Council of the Colony of Mauritius.
- Douglas Rider Maxwell, Government Secretary, State of North Borneo.
- Eric Mills OBE Assistant Chief Secretary, Palestine.
- Herbert Harvey Rushton, Treasurer, Kenya.
- Frank Edred Whitehead OBE MRCS LRCP lately of the East African Medical Service and Director of Medical and Sanitary Services, Nyasaland Protectorate.
- The Right Reverend John Jamieson William OBE Bishop of Uganda.

Colonies, Protectorates, etc.

- Charles George Dupuis, Governor of Darfur Province, Sudan.
- William James Glenny OBE Commercial Counsellor in His Majesty's Legation at Stockholm.
- Andrew George Hume Sievwright MBE Director of Customs and Excise Ministry of Finance, Baghdad.
- Daisy Bates. For services in connection with the welfare of Australian aborigines.
- Herbert William Champion, Government Secretary, Territory of Papua, Commonwealth of Australia.
- Agnes Dennis of Halifax, Nova Scotia. For a lifetime of distinguished service to the cause of humanity.
- George Martin Farrow JP President of the Limbless Soldiers Association, State of New South Wales.
- Francis Layton Foord, Deputy Resident Commissioner and Government Secretary, Basutoland.
- Laura Holland RRC of Vancouver, British Columbia. For work in organising and developing outpost welfare services and child protection work in Eastern and Western Canada.
- Charles Albert Knowles, Private Secretary to successive High Commissioners in London for the Dominion of New Zealand.
- Helen MacMurchy lately Chief, Division of Child Welfare, Department of Pensions and National Health of Canada.
- Robert Aubrey Oxlade, chairman of the Board of Cricket Control, Commonwealth of Australia.
- Edith Catherine Rayside RRC Superintendent of Hamilton General Hospital, Ontario. For public services.
- Elizabeth Lawrie Smellie RRC Chief Superintendent, Victorian Order of Nurses for Canada.
- Charlotte Whitton Executive Director, The Canadian Council on Child and Family Welfare.
- Laura Wood For services to educational and cultural development in New Brunswick.

British India

- Syed Wakil Ahmad Rizvi, President of the Legislative Council, Central Provinces.

Honorary Commanders

- Tito Gafabusa Winyi IV, Omukama of Bunyoro, Uganda Protectorate.

==== Officer of the Order of the British Empire (OBE) ====
Military Division
Royal Navy

- Commander Geoffrey David Taylor RN
- Commander Robert Holmes De'Ath RN
- Surgeon Commander Kenneth Hill Hole RN
- Major Vincent Christopher Brown DSC Royal Marines.
- Paymaster-Commander Charles Avison Parker RAN

Army

- Lieutenant-Colonel Frederick John Ayris VD Officer Commanding, State Troops, Pahang, Federated Malay States Volunteer Force.
- Lieutenant-Colonel Joseph Arthur Crosthwaite, retired pay, late The Durham Light Infantry, attached to The War Office.
- Major Ivan de la Bere, The Dorsetshire Regiment, late Staff Captain, Auxiliary and Territorial Forces, Bombay District, India.
- Major William Roy Hodgson, Staff Corps, Australian Military Forces, General Staff Officer, 2nd Grade, Department of the Chief of the Australian Section, Imperial General Staff.
- Major (local Lieutenant-Colonel) Herbert Busteed Holt MC The East Yorkshire Regiment, Officer Commanding, Somaliland Camel Corps, The King's African Rifles.
- Captain Cuthbert Harold Boyd Rodham MC 18th Royal Garhwal Rifles, Indian Army.
- Major Alfred Villiers MBE Indian Army Ordnance Corps, late Chief Ordnance Officer, Ordnance Depot, Lahore, India.
- Major (Commissary) John Lewis Wetton, Indian Army Corps of Clerks (India Unattached List), late Chief Clerk, Western Command, India.

Civil Division

- George Henry Joseph Adlam Senior Science Master, City of London School.
- Percy Adrian Aubin Lately Receiver-General of Jersey.
- James Barratt, Head of Printing and Publications Branch, Patent Office, Board of Trade.
- Christopher Johnston Bisset, Sheriff Clerk of the Sheriffdom of Forfar.
- Ethel Mary Brain JP For political and public services in Llandaff and Barry.
- Alderman George Bertie Brooks. Chairman of the Paddington and St. Marylebone War Pensions Committee.
- John Robert Casburn Chief Constable of the Grantham Borough Police.
- William John Charlton H.M. Divisional Inspector of Mines for the North Western Division, Mines Department of the Board of Trade.
- Charles Coles, Principal of Cardiff Technical College.
- Clarence Hamilton Creasey, H.M. Inspector of Schools.
- Alderman Harry Dack JP Alderman, North Riding of Yorkshire County Council. For many years agent for the Cleveland Miners and Quarrymen's Association. For public services in the North Riding.
- Harold Frederick Downie Principal, Colonial Office.
- Alderman Edward Malachi Dyer JP Chairman of the Port Labour Committee and of the Docks Committee of the Bristol Corporation. Recently Lord Mayor of Bristol.
- Walker Fairbairn JP At one time Mayor of Barrow. For public services in Barrow.
- William Gauld, Assistant Government Director of Indian Railway Companies, India Office.
- Frank Gent Deputy Assistant Accountant-General, Ministry of Labour.
- William Alfred Harvey MM Until recently Mayor of Guildford. For services in relief of unemployment.
- William Percival Hildred Lately Finance Officer, Empire Marketing Board.
- John Ward Holman President of the Lynton Working Men's Institute. For public services in Lynton and district.
- George Thomas Knight MBE Chief Constable of Hertfordshire.
- Hilda Annie Lamport. For her services to the English Colony at Alassio, Italy.
- Isaac Low JP Chairman of the Juvenile Advisory Committee and of the Local Employment Committee, Springburn, Glasgow.
- William Alfred McKears Deputy-Controller of Stamps, Board of Inland Revenue.
- Walter Makower FInstP Professor of Science, Royal Military Academy.
- Captain Christopher Gibbs Mitchell MInstCE Engineering Inspector, Ministry of Transport.
- Robert Owen Morris FRSE JP Lately Director of Education, Welsh National Memorial Association.
- Councillor Walter Hogarth Nightingale. For political and public services in Great Yarmouth.
- Maurice Christopher Pink Deputy Controller, London Telephone Service, General Post Office.
- Colonel Henry Charles Savage MBE Commandant, Metropolitan Special Constabulary.
- John Scott Chief Constable of the City of Perth Police Force.
- Elizabeth Ellen Sparks. For political and public services in North St. Pancras.
- Councillor Thomas Stevenson JP Voluntary Probation Officer, Edinburgh. Chairman of the Edinburgh Probation Committee.
- Alderman John Stocker JP Chairman of the Exeter Education Committee.
- Richard Harry Riding Tee Town Clerk of the Borough of Hackney.
- Arthur Owen Thomas, First Class Clerk, Central Office, Supreme Court of Judicature.
- Joseph Wilfred Train Principal, Board of Customs and Excise.
- Vera Elinor Whishaw. Clerk in the Private Secretary's Office, Buckingham Palace.
- Eleanor Gordon Woodgate. Deputy Chief Inspector (National Health Insurance), Ministry of Health.

Diplomatic Service and Overseas List

- Miralai Francis Douglas Baker Bey MC Assistant Commandant, Cairo City Police.
- Captain Basil Hubert Cooper. For services rendered to British interests in Philadelphia.
- Nellie Elizabeth Eddy Macrae. For relief work among the British Community in Buenos Aires.
- Cecil Gervase Hope-Gill, His Majesty's Vice-Consul at Jedda.
- Christopher William Stanway, Auditor-General to Sudan Government.
- The Venerable George Thomas Basden Secretary, Church Missionary Society, Niger Mission; Archdeacon of the Niger and Nominated Unofficial Member of the Legislative Council of Nigeria.
- James Beattie MC Commandant of Police and Director of Prisons, Somaliland Protectorate.
- Frederick William Biddle, lately Member of the Executive Council of the Colony of British Honduras.
- Norman Henry Martin Bowden, Emigration Commissioner for Ceylon in South India.
- Albert Bonus Carr MBE Nominated Unofficial Member of the Legislative Council of Trinidad and Tobago.
- Reginald Stuart Champion, Protectorate Secretary, Aden.
- Robert Stephen Duke Goodwin, Unofficial Member of the Executive Council of the Presidency of Antigua, Leeward Islands.
- Montagu Cecil Craigie-Halkett, Colonial Treasurer, Falkland Islands.
- Frank Colbran Turner Lord, Manager in Fiji of the Colonial Sugar Refining Company. For public services.
- Cecil McMahon MC District Officer, Tanganyika Territory.
- Thomas Hunter Massey MC LRCP and S., East African Medical Service. Senior Medical Officer, Kenya.
- Frederick Albert Mathias, Colonial Treasurer, Sierra Leone.
- Archibald Montgomery. For services to the State of Kelantan, Malay States.
- George Seymour Seymour, Mayor of Kingston, and Elected Member of the Legislative Council of Jamaica.
- Barugh Spearman East African Medical Service. Deputy Director of Sanitary Service, Zanzibar.
- Harold Beken Thomas, deputy director of Surveys, Uganda Protectorate.
- Togbi Sri II., Paramount Chief of Awuna, Gold Coast.
- Eric Dauncey Tongue, District Officer, Uganda Protectorate.
- Arthur Harold Unwin, Conservator of Forests, Cyprus.

Colonies, Protectorates, etc.

- Justine Lacoste Beaubien, of Montreal, Quebec. For services for sick and crippled children; in founding and extending the St. Justine Hospital.
- Gladys Emily Campbell, of Windsor, Ontario. For personal service in every form of community welfare.
- Gertrude Childs, Supervisor, Department of Public Welfare of the province of Manitoba.
- Jessie Maud Colby, of Stanstead, Quebec. For maintaining the best traditions of community service and citizenship.
- Marguerita Douglas Fowler, of Swan River, Manitoba. For establishing and maintaining Saint Faith's House as a community centre in Northern Manitoba.
- Lillian Freiman, of Ottawa, Ontario. For community work; service to returned soldiers; leadership in Jewish charitable organisations.
- Lucy Hallenstein, For philanthropic and social services in the Commonwealth of Australia.
- Caro Leclerc Hamilton, Presidente-fondatrice, l'Assistance Maternelle, Montreal, Quebec.
- Donald Mackay. For services in connection with scientific exploration and survey in the interior of Australia.
- Violet Clara MacNaughton, of Saskatoon, Saskatchewan. For services to practical agriculture and organisation of rural women.
- Sibylla Emily Maude. For services in connection with District Nursing in the Dominion of New Zealand.
- Jane Anna Mowbray, President of the Auckland Branch of the Victoria League, Dominion of New Zealand.
- Jessica Frederica Pauline Sawyer, State President of the Country Women's Association, New South Wales. For services to the Commonwealth of Australia.
- Abe Shannon. For public and philanthropic services in the State of South Australia.
- Ruby May Simpson, of Regina, Saskatchewan. For work for the Junior Red Cross nursing services and health education in the province of Saskatchewan.
- Peter Donald Strachan Superintendent, Leper Settlement, Botsabelo, Basutoland.
- Mary Josephine Strothard, of Truro, Nova Scotia. For many years of effective service as head of the Maritime Home for Girls.
- Frances Bernard Tessier, of Quebec. For half a century of service for needy mothers and children.
- Martyn Monson Threlfall, Private Secretary to Prime Minister, Publicity Officer, and Officer-in-Charge of Cabinet Secretariat, Commonwealth of Australia.

British India

- Hari Pada Bhaumik (India), Superior Telegraph Engineering Service, Electrical Engineer-in-Chief, Posts and Telegraphs Department.
- Max Christian Carl Bonington, Indian Forest Service, lately Divisional Forest Officer and Forest Development, Officer, Andamans.
- Charles Harrington Fletcher, Salt Department, Assistant Collector of Salt Revenue, Bombay.
- Andrew Gemmell, Assistant, Messrs. Heatly and Gresham, Engineers, Calcutta, Bengal.
- Oliver Gilbert Grace, Indian Police, District Officer, Frontier Constabulary, North-West Frontier Province.
- Archibald Winder Hutton MC Assistant Manager, Burmah-Shell Oil Storage Distributing Company of India, Ltd., Madras.
- William Meek, Manager of the Aden Branch of the firm of Messrs. Cory Brothers, Aden.
- Charles Clement Paul MICE Deputy Chief Engineer, Public Works Department, His Exalted Highness the Nizam's Government, Hyderabad (Deccan).
- Claude Stanley Ricketts MBE Assistant Secretary to the Agent to the Government of India in South Africa.
- James Edward Ryall MBE Indian Police, Assistant Inspector-General, Government Railway Police, Punjab.
- Bernard Gordon Prothero Thomas, Indian Police, Deputy Inspector-General of Police, United Provinces.
- John James Watson, Superintendent of Government Printing and Stationery, Bombay.

Honorary Officers

- Victor Konn. For public services in Palestine.

==== Member of the Order of the British Empire (MBE) ====
Military Division
Royal Navy

- Paymaster Commander Alexander Adnett Garrett RNR (Retired).
- Headmaster Horace Evelyn Hindman RN
- Lieutenant John Nicholas Hambly RN
- Commissioned Gunner Henry Swales DSM RN
- Commissioned Engineer Ernest Easthope Budden RN
- Commissioned Engineer William Francis Kearns

Army

- Sub-Conductor Frederick William Charles Burnett, Indian Army Ordnance Corps (India Unattached List).
- Captain Eric Steven Paul Carrad, The Ceylon Army Service Corps, Ceylon Defence Force.
- 1st Class Staff Sergeant-Major Walter James Eatwell, Military Detention Corps (India), (India Unattached List).
- Quarter-Master and Honorary Major Daniel Robert Glasgow MC Australian Instructional Corps, Adjutant and Quarter-Master, Army Service Corps, 5th Division, Australian Military Forces.
- Lieutenant Angus Macdonald, The Royal Scots Fusiliers, late Assistant Embarkation Staff Officer (Staff Captain), Karachi, India.
- Captain Arthur Richard Mcivor Army Educational Corps, Instructor, Indian Military Academy, Dehra Dun, India.
- Lieutenant Mahmud Jan, 11th Battalion, 12th Frontier Force Regiment, Indian Territorial Force.
- Lieutenant Alexander John Minjoot, Reserve of Officers, Straits Settlements Volunteer Force.
- Quarter-Master and Honorary Lieutenant Leonard Charles Wade, Australian Instructional Corps, Instructor, Australian School of Artillery.
- Major Charles Cleveland Walton, Militia, British Guiana.
- Lieutenant (local Captain) Frederick George Winward, Regular Army Reserve of Officers, Quarter-Master, The Sierra Leone Battalion, Royal West African Frontier Force.

Royal Air Force

Civil Division

- Alderman William John Armstrong JP Chairman of the Committee of Investigation for the Midland District set up under the Coal Mines Act, 1930.
- Alderman Joseph Ashworth JP Chairman of the Leigh Local Employment Committee.
- Duncan Frederick Basden, Chairman of the Executive of Christian Service Union. For services in connection with the Training Farm for unemployed youths at Wallingford and the Home for epileptics at Lingfield.
- Lila Baxter. Superintendent Health Visitor, Birmingham.
- Thomas Matthews Blagg, His Majesty's Inspector for the Liverpool District, Aliens Branch, Home Office.
- Alfred Sutherland Buckhurst, Assistant, Plant Pathological Laboratory, Harpenden.
- Charles William Burge, Staff Officer, Engineer-in-Chief's Office, General Post Office.
- William Trentham Symons Butlin, Assistant Engineer, Roads Department, Ministry of Transport.
- Edwin John Byard Lately Higher Grade Clerk in the Department of Printed Books, British Museum.
- Alfred James Camm, Staff Officer, Air Ministry.
- James Canter, Senior Examiner in the Estate Duty Office, London, Board of Inland Revenue.
- Evelyn Creech ARRC Lately Matron of Mossley Ministry of Pensions Hospital, Liverpool.
- Duncan Sinclair Currie Assistant Postmaster, Glasgow General Post Office.
- Albert Crossley Dodd, Principal Clerk, Ministry of Pensions.
- Alfred Edgar Driver, Head Master, Maisemore Church of England School, Gloucester.
- Alexander Ferguson Ferguson MC Assistant Secretary, Scottish Juvenile Welfare and After-Care Office, Edinburgh.
- Hugh Alexander Fraser Head Master of Glen Urquhart Higher Grade School.
- Beryl Lindsay Guthrie. Shorthand Secretary to the Permanent Undersecretary of State for War.
- Major Harold Flintoff Hall DSO TD Manager of a Government Instruction Centre, Ministry of Labour.
- Mary Cozens-Hardy JP Vice-chairman of the Norwich and District War Pensions Committee and Chairman of the Children's Sub-Committee.
- William Evelyn Hardy, Head Master, Woodlands Senior Council School, Adwick-le-Street, West Riding.
- Elizabeth Catherine, Lady Heath, Vice-chairman of the Children's Sub-Committee, Portsmouth, Chichester, and District War Pensions Committee.
- Walter Wellesley Hill MInstCE Resident Engineer, Peterhead Harbour of Refuge Works, Admiralty.
- John Edward Horwell Superintendent, Metropolitan Police (Criminal Investigation Department).
- Frederick Ineson JP Chairman of the Batley Local Employment Committee.
- Albert Smedley Judson Inspector of Branch Offices, Export Credits Guarantee Department.
- William Herman Kent National Secretary of the Federation of Grocers Associations of the United Kingdom.
- Mary Moore Kerr. Head Mistress, Mitford Street Infants Council School, Newcastle upon Tyne.
- Louise King. Head of Gopsall Street L.C.C. Women's Institute, Shoreditch.
- Isabel Lawrence RRC Lately Matron of the Star and Garter Home at Richmond for Disabled Sailors and Soldiers.
- Walter James Longden FCIS Clerk and Steward, East and West Suffolk Mental Hospital. President of the Association of Clerks and Stewards of Mental Hospitals.
- David Hume Lyal Senior Intelligence Officer, Department of Overseas Trade.
- Arthur John Marshall Surveyor, H.M. Office of Works and Public Buildings.
- George Finch Masters MIMechE Manager, Royal Carriage Department, Royal Ordnance Factories, War Office.
- Harry Ernest May, Superintendent, Metropolitan Police.
- Edith Florence Neish. Chief Superintendent of Typists, Savings Bank Department, General Post Office.
- Frederick Arthur Partridge. Staff Officer, Ministry of Health.
- Thomas Pennington Superintendent and Deputy Chief Constable, Worcestershire Constabulary.
- Helen Priscilla Rabagliati. For political and public services in Yorkshire.
- Joseph Relf District Officer of H.M. Coastguard, Board of Trade.
- Colin Arthur William Roberts, Master of Walton Street Hospital, Liverpool.
- George Stanley Smith MC Brigade Secretary and Head of the Boys Brigade.
- Charles Leonard Thompson. Income Tax Officer, Public Trustee Office.
- William Thompson Superintendent, Lancashire Constabulary.
- Janet Beatrice Tickell. Assistant to the Private Secretary, India Office.
- Charles Stephen Toseland Acting Senior Intelligence Officer, Department of Overseas Trade.
- Alderman Arthur Richard Travers JP In recognition of his services in founding and organising the Bridport and District Hospital League.
- Edith May Turner. Matron, Royal Eastern Counties institution for the Mentally Defective, Colchester.
- Robert Algernon Johnson Wadsworth, Head Master, Elstow Council School; Bedfordshire.
- Elsie Margaret Wagg. In recognition of her services in initiating and organising the Scheme for the opening of gardens in aid of the Queen's Institute of District Nursing.
- Frederick Charles Warne Waterguard Superintendent, First Class, Board of Customs and Excise.
- James Henry Whitehead, Works Manager, H.M. Stationery Office Press, Pocock Street.
- Martha Whittaker. Registrar of Births and Deaths for the Blackley Sub District of Manchester, North Registration District.
- Mary Anne Williams. A voluntary worker at the Ministry of Pensions Hospital, Rookwood, Llandaff.

Diplomatic Service and Overseas List

- Nora Bing, Employed in His Majesty's Legation at Oslo.
- Frank Derek Corfield, Assistant District Commissioner, Upper Nile Province, Sudan.
- Reginald Thomas Davidson, British Vice Consul at Kansas City.
- Eustace Geoffrey Harvey Formby, British Vice-Consul at Seville.
- Charles Frederick Ogle Gibson, First Archivist at His Majesty's Embassy at Brussels.
- Daniel Herbert Paterson, Chief Clerk's Department, Ordnance Service, Egyptian Army.
- Eileen Reid. For untiring work for the British Legion in Santiago.
- Elizabeth. Sutherland Turner, Registrar at His Majesty's Legation at Copenhagen.
- Angelo George Antippa, Chief Clerk, Secretariat, Palestine.
- Mehmed Aziz, Chief Sanitary Inspector, Department of Health, Cyprus.
- Edward William Eldred Battaye, lately Chief Clerk, Judicial Department, Mombasa, Kenya.
- Ernest Samuel Beoku Betts, Second Urban Member of the Legislative Council of Sierra Leone.
- Flora MacDonald Biggar, Nursing Sister, Kenya.
- Marion Braddon. For philanthropic and social services in Negri Sembilan, Federated Malay. States.
- James Cardin. For public and philanthropic services, in Saint Christopher and Nevis, Leeward Islands.
- William Cowper lately Headmaster of Jamaica College. For services to education in Jamaica.
- Marie Denaro. For philanthropic and social services in Malta.
- Harold Flint, Confidential Clerk, Medical Department, Uganda Protectorate.
- Brian Joseph Hartley, District Agricultural Officer, Tanganyika Territory.
- John William Frederick Knowles, Warden, Counties of Victoria and St. Patrick, Trinidad.
- Reginald Morison Millar, Inspector of Police, and Gaoler, Nassau Prison, Bahamas.
- Henry John Stephen Norton, Assistant Secretary, Gibraltar.
- The Reverend Augustus George Partridge. For services as Missionary Priest in charge of the Island of Tristan da Cunha.
- Martinus Charles Perera. For social services in Ceylon.
- William George Phelps, Superintendent Engineer, Transport Department, Nyasaland Protectorate.
- Evanthia Pierides. For philanthropic services in Cyprus.
- Charles Duncan Simpson, Government Transport Agent, Northern Rhodesia.
- Khimji Katau Sually, Unofficial Member of the Legislative Council, Zanzibar.
- Tang Shiu Kin. For public services in Hong Kong.

Colonies, Protectorates, etc.

- Annie Clowes. For services as Lecturer for the Empire Marketing Board.
- Katherine Mary Clutterbuck, Sister Kate; lately in charge of the Parkerville Children's Homes, State of Western Australia.
- Graham Watt Coghlin. For long continued work in family welfare services in Montreal, Quebec.
- Edna Lillian Craven, of New Liskeard, Ontario. For public service in improving rural life.
- Sarah Persis Darrach, of Brandon, Manitoba. For work in organising, health and welfare services.
- Rose Margaret Davies. For services to education in the Skeena District and Coastal Islands of British Columbia.
- Nancy Eleanor Dunn, of Sunset Prairie, British Columbia. For services in outpost nursing in the Peace River Settlements.
- Amy Earl, of Charlottetown, Prince Edward Island. For services in community welfare work.
- Hannah Estabrook, of Saint John, New Brunswick. For work in assisting new settlers in the three Eastern Maritime Provinces.
- Marjory Millicent Grosvenor, Confidential Typist to Prime Minister, Commonwealth of Australia.
- John Guy, Confidential Messenger in the Office of the Governor-General of the Dominion of Canada.
- Emily Mary Hedley, of Moosejaw, Saskatchewan. For services in welfare and relief work.
- Sarah Hynes JP For public services in the Commonwealth of Australia.
- Mary Raymur Lawson, of Victoria, British Columbia. On retiring from a lifetime of active effort in community service.
- Elizabeth Mackay. For charitable services, chiefly for the welfare of seafaring men, in the State of New South Wales.
- Rebecca Marston. Matron of the Infants Home, Ashfield, State of New South Wales.
- Kathleen Mary Pocock Parsons, of Port Credit, Ontario. For service to child welfare and other social services.
- Elizabeth Agnes Pearston, of Grand Prairie, Alberta. For effective administration of outpost hospital services.
- Charlotte Rennie Phillips, of Prince Albert, Saskatchewan. For social and charitable work.
- Edna Gaunce Ross, of Riley Brook, New Brunswick. For nursing and neighbourhood services.
- Bertha Sophia Clarke Smith, of London, Ontario. For services in connection with child and community welfare.
- Annie Montgomery Tilley, of Lethbridge, Alberta. For long continued service as head of the Nursing Mission.

British India

- Khan Bahadur Saiyid Ain-ud-Din, Undersecretary to the Government of the United Provinces, Local Self-Government and Public Health Departments.
- Khan Bahadur Abdul Alim, Persian Gulf Residency Ministerial Staff, lately Indian Attache to His Majesty's Consul, Kerman, Persian Gulf.
- Ernest Frank Allen, Civilian Officer employed under the Officer-in-Charge, Indian Army Service Corps Records, Dagshai.
- Babu Shib Chandra Banerji, Sub-Registrar, Narayangarh, Midnapore, Bengal.
- William Beatty, Sub-Assistant Auditor, Bombay, Baroda and Central India Railway, Bombay.
- George Shipley Beckett, Registrar, Office of the Private Secretary to His Excellency the Viceroy.
- Harry Edward Borthwick, Customs Service, Chief Inspector, Preventive Service, Calcutta, Bengal.
- James Avenel Douglas, Punjab Police Service, Deputy Superintendent of Police, Delhi.
- Captain Ashley Edwin Dunbar Harvey, Indian Medical Department, Superintendent, Central Jail, Peshawar, North-West Frontier Province.
- Frederick Walter Haughton, chairman, Municipal Council, Coonoor, The Nilgiris, Madras.
- Percival James Hudson, Excise Inspector, Railway Lines, Bombay.
- Edward Samuel Jones, Deputy Superintendent of Police, 24-Parganas, Bengal.
- Francis Fredrick Lean, retired Loco Foreman, Jodhpur-Bikaner Railway, Jodhpur State, Rajputana.
- Norman Douglas Lisbey, Superintendent, Engineer-in-Chief's Branch, Army Headquarters, India.
- William Thomas Newton, Officer Supervisor, Quartermaster-General's Branch, Army Headquarters, India.
- Ernest Michael Phillips, Deputy Superintendent of Police, United Provinces.
- Charles Allan Pinto FZS Curator, Zoological Gardens, Lahore, Punjab.
- Mervyn James Stiles Rosair, Burma Forest Service, Extra Assistant Conservator of Forests, Burma.
- Willoughby Patrick Rosemeyer, Posts and Telegraphs Department, Engineering Supervisor, Telegraphs.
- Khan Bahadur Saiyid Mahmud Shah, Indian Police, Superintendent of Police, Bombay.
- Babu Chandreshwar Prasad Singh, Zamindar, Bihar and Orissa.
- Anthony George Stevens, Superintendent of the Office of the Military Secretary to His Excellency the Governor of Bombay.
- Rustomji Dhanjibhai Tanksalvala, Bullion Registrar, His Majesty's Mint, Bombay.
- Major Alfred Harry Tarbotton Head Master, Abu Lawrence School, Rajputana.
- Captain William Wailling, Director, Messrs. Barton, Son & Co., Ltd., Manufacturing Jewellers of Bangalore, and late Assistant Provincial Commissioner, Boy Scouts Association, Bangalore.

Honorary Members

- Jibrail Effendi Katul, Senior Arab Inspector, Department of Education, Palestine.
- Tengku Mohammed ibni almerhum Sultan Ahmad Matham Shah, Malay Assistant Commissioner of Police, Federated Malay States.
- Ali Bey Tabbara, Minister of Agriculture in the Trans-Jordan Government.

=== Members of the Order of the Companions of Honour (CH) ===
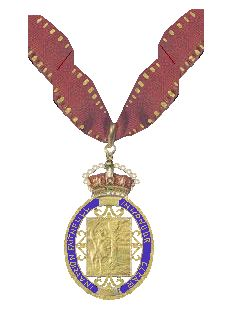
The riband and badge of the "Companions of Honour"

- Thomas Ethelbert Page Editor-in-Chief of the Loeb Classical Library. For services to scholarship and letters.

=== Kaisar-i-Hind Medal ===
First Class

- Margaret Wilkie, Lady Bhore MBE (wife of the Honourable Sir Joseph Bhore KCSI KCIE CBE), New Delhi.
- Barbara Mary Isobel Burge (widow of the late B. E. J. Burge, lately District Magistrate, Midnapur, Bengal).
- Alexander Isabel Burton, Lady Superintendent, Lady Minto's Indian Nursing Association, Murree, Punjab.
- Constance Falkiner, Lady Superintendent of Nursing, Medical College Hospitals, Calcutta, Bengal.
- Gladys Helen Mary Muir (wife of G. B. F. Muir, United Provinces).
- Barbara Geraldine Todd (wife of A. H. A. Todd, Acting Third Member of the Board-of Revenue, Madras).
- Sardar Shrinivas Cupuswami Mudliar, First Class Sardar of the Deccan, Poona, Bombay.
- The Reverend Frank Colyer Sackett, Missionary, chairman and General Superintendent, Hyderabad District Methodist Mission, Secunderabad, Hyderabad (Deccan).
- Sarabji Pestonji Shroff FRCSE Eye Specialist, Delhi.
- U. Shwe Tha, Barrister-at-Law, Landowner, Trader and President of the Akyab Municipal Committee, Burma.

=== British Empire Medal (BEM) ===
Military Division
For Meritorious Service

- Spencer McEwen, The Queen's Own Royal West Kent Regiment, attached The Sierra Leone Battalion, Royal West African Frontier Force.
- Sergeant (Acting Regimental Sergeant-Major) Ernest Reginald Taylor, late Royal Artillery, late attached University of London Contingent; Officers Training Corps.

Civil Division
For Meritorious Service

- Charles Derby Davis. Leading Compositor, Ordnance Committee Printing Office, Royal Arsenal.
- William Gilbertson. Driver of the London Midland and Scottish Railway Company's train the Royal Scot.
- Robert Gordon. Head Gardener and Caretaker, Imperial War Graves Commission, Belgium.
- William Percy Norman. Chief Officer, H.M. Prison, Leeds.
- Horace Tom Best Reed, Sorter, London Postal Service, General Post Office.
- Mary Margaret Worth. Assistant Supervisor, Class II, London Telephone Service, General Post Office.
- Edith Ellen Young. Chief Officer, H.M. Borstal Institution, Aylesbury.
- Thomas Pearson. Head Constable, British Legation, Peking.
- Abdel Wakid Mohammed Nur. Stores Checker, Sudan Railways.
- Awad Effendi Bilal. Police Officer, Darfur Province, Sudan.
- Adura Akot. Sergeant-Major, Sudan Police.

=== King's Police Medal (KPM) ===
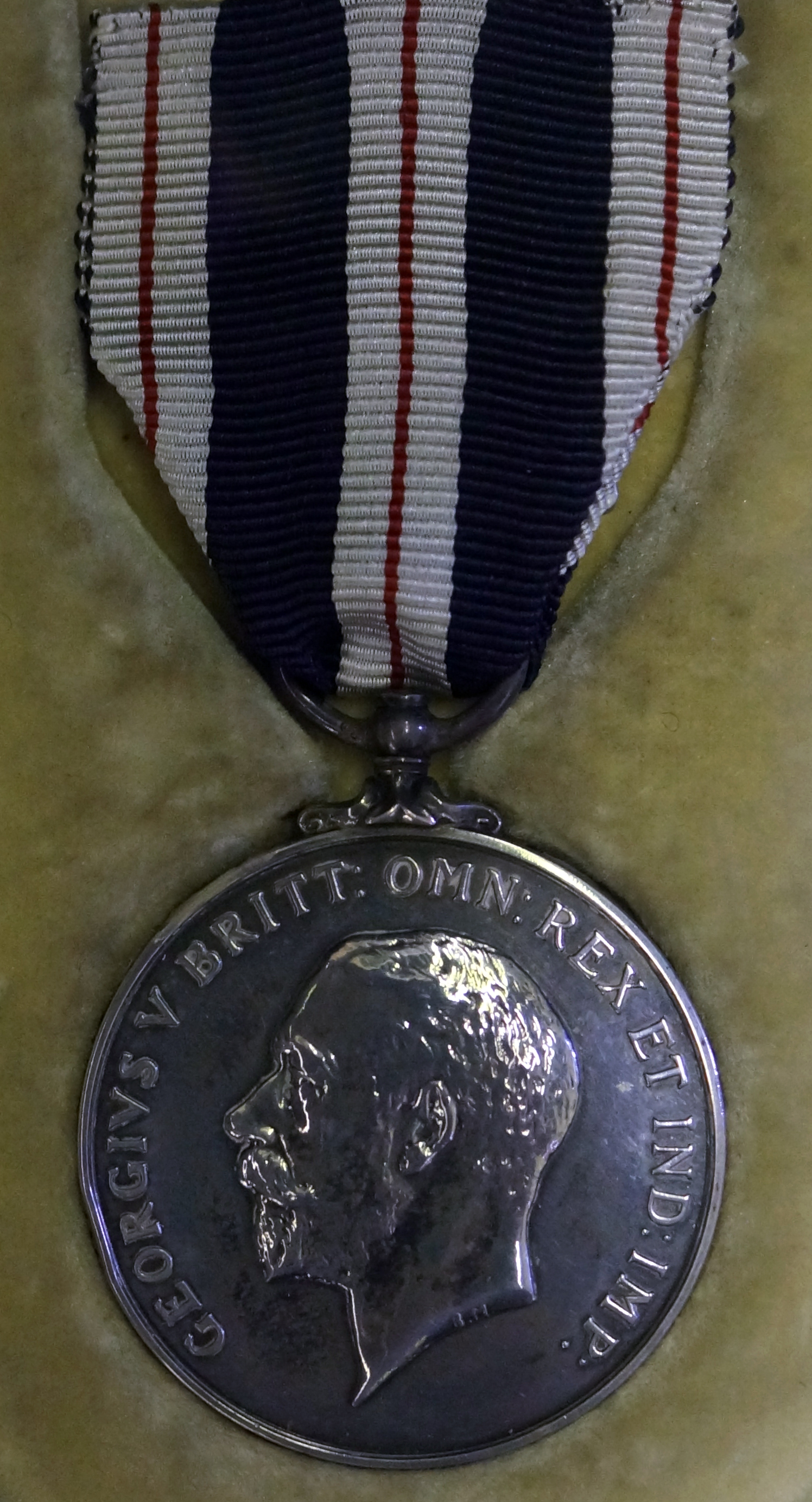
King's Police Medal with the riband for gallantry

For Gallantry
England and Wales

- Frederick Gilbert Blundell, Constable, Metropolitan Police Force.
- William Bunce, Constable, Metropolitan Police Force.
- Frederick Ernest Hawkes, Constable, Metropolitan Police Force.
- Thomas John Haynes, Constable, Metropolitan Police Force.
- William Frederick King, Constable, Metropolitan Police Force.
- James Lemmon, Constable, Metropolitan Police Force.
- Laurie Andrew McLaren, Constable, Metropolitan Police Force.
- William Albert Robins, Constable, Metropolitan Police Force.
- Walter Henry Todd, Constable, Metropolitan Police Force.
- Albert Hewlett, Constable, Buckinghamshire Constabulary.
- Eli Claude Edward Smith, Constable, Worcestershire Constabulary.
- A. Cleaver, Constable, Chester City Police Force.
- Walter Hesketh, Constable, Manchester City Police Force.
- Arnold Yates, Constable, Manchester City Police Force.
- Francis Henry Heywood, Sub-Officer, London Fire Brigade.

Scotland

- George Watty Constable, Edinburgh City Police Force.
- Charles Wickham, Constable, Edinburgh City Police Force.

Australia

- Christopher Alexander John Coe, Constable, Victoria Police.

British India

- Rai Bon Behari Mukherji Bahadur, Additional Deputy Commissioner of Police, Bengal. (a bar to the King's Police Medal)
- Khan Bahadur Muhammad Shamsuddahar, Assistant Commissioner of Police, Bengal. (a bar to the King's Police Medal)
- Munshi Niaz Ahmad Khan, Circle Inspector, United Provinces Police. (a bar to the King's Police Medal)
- Babu Dhanpati Upadhyaya, Inspector, Bihar and Orissa Police. (a bar to the King's Police Medal)
- Calavai Chengarlvaraya Ayyar Duraiswami Ayyar, Sub-Inspector, Madras Police.
- Narayanaswami Desika Gramani, Constable, Madras Police.
- Ponnuswami Jagarayan Arokiaswami Pillai, Sub-Inspector, Madras Police.
- Robert Gray Paull, Inspector, Bombay City Police.
- Edward Mills, Inspector, Bombay Police.
- Ramdihel Rampadarath, Constable, Bombay City Police.
- Cyril George Grassby, Superintendent, Bengal Police.
- Richard Charles Pollard, Special Assistant to the Deputy Inspector General, Intelligence Branch, Bengal Police.
- Sasadhar Biswas, Officiating Inspector, Bengal Police.
- Ernest Carew, Sergeant, Bengal Police.
- M. Hasan Askari, Sub-Inspector, United Provinces Police.
- Thakur Harbans Singh, Sub-Inspector, United Provinces Police.
- Thakur Mazbut Singh, Sub-Inspector, United Provinces Police.
- Kedar Singh, Head Constable, United Provinces Police.
- Thakur Ram Singh, Sub-Inspector, United Provinces Police.
- Jehan Dad Khan, Sub-Inspector, Punjab Police.
- Ram Singh, Mounted Constable, Punjab Police.
- John Bertram Finch Field, Indian Police.
- John Pim Watson Johnston, Superintendent, Bihar and Orissa Police.
- Sadhu Sukul, Havildar, Bihar and Orissa Police.
- Ram Sohawan Singh, Constable, Bihar and Orissa Police.
- Niaz Ahmad, Inspector, Central Provinces Police.
- Channan Singh, Assistant Sub-Inspector, North-West Frontier Province Police.
- Hanifullah, Officiating Sub-Inspector, North-West Frontier Province Police.
- Taza Gul, Lance Head Constable, North-West Frontier Province Police.
- Khan Bahadur, Head Constable, North-West Frontier Province Police.
- Feroz Jang, Head Constable, North-West Frontier Province Police.
- Chakrapani Pillai Arumugham Pillai, Acting Inspector, Puddukkottai State Police.

His Majesty has also graciously consented to the King's Police Medal being handed to the next-of-kin of the deceased officers whose names appear below, and who would have received the decoration had they survived:

- Mahmud Khan, Head Constable, North-West Frontier Province Police.
- Thakur Nathu Sing, Sub-Inspector, Kotah State Police.

Colonies, Protectorates and Mandated Territories

- Seidu Moshi, Escort Police Sergeant, Gold Coast Police Force.
- Adana Onana, Lance-Corporal, Nigeria Police.
- Umba Ibode, First Class Constable, Nigeria Police.
- James Teuma, Constable, Malta Police.
- Joseph Rodriques Watler, Inspector, Cayman Islands Police Force, Jamaica.

For Distinguished Service
England and Wales

- Lieutenant-Colonel Frank Brook DSO MC Chief Constable of the West Riding of Yorkshire.
- Robert Humphrey Prothero, Chief Constable of Anglesey.
- John Henry Dain OBE Chief Constable of the Norwich City Police Force.
- Frank Davies, Chief Constable of the Shrewsbury Borough Police Force.
- Archibald Kennedy Wilson, Chief Constable of the Liverpool City Police Force.
- Walter Martyn Else, Superintendent, Derbyshire Constabulary.
- Frederick William Gray, Superintendent, Surrey Constabulary.
- Arthur Edward Martin, Superintendent, Devon Constabulary.
- John Wight, Superintendent, Northumberland Constabulary.
- Thomas Dale, Superintendent, Newcastle upon Tyne City Police Force.
- Archibald Baker, Superintendent, London Fire Brigade.
- William Tozer, Chief Officer, West Bromwich Fire Brigade.

Scotland

- David Warnock, Assistant Chief Constable, Glasgow City Police Force.
- Joseph Peters, Superintendent, Glasgow City Police Force.

Northern Ireland

- Thomas Condy, Head Constable, Royal Ulster Constabulary.

British India

- Peter McArthur Stewart, District Superintendent, Bombay Police.
- Khan Sahib Jahangir Rustomji Sukhia, Deputy Superintendent, Bombay Police.
- Khan Bahadur Nadirshah Dadabhai Shroff, Officiating Deputy Superintendent, Bombay Police.
- Roy Bishop Smith, Superintendent, Bombay City Police. Stanley Grisewood Taylor, Superintendent, Bengal Police.
- Rai Bhupendra Nath Banarji Bahadur, Deputy Commissioner of Police, Calcutta.
- Ernest Springfield, Superintendent, Bengal Police.
- John Chalice Lobb, Superintendent, Punjab Police.
- Robert Hardie, Officiating Deputy Inspector-General and Commissioner of Police, Rangoon.
- Lieutenant-Colonel Maurice Claud Raymond CIE MC Commandant, Burma Military Police.
- Khan Bahadur Atta Mohammed Khan Sardar Bahadur, Naib-Couunandant, Burma Military Police.

Colonies, Protectorates and Mandated Territories

- Captain Maurice St. Clair Thorn, Deputy Commissioner of Police, Uganda Protectorate.
- Anthony Ilex Sheringham, Commandant of Police and Governor of Prisons, Zanzibar.
- Major Frederick Alan Benson Nicoll OBE Deputy Commissioner of Police, Tanganyika Territory.
- Captain Harry Leonard Webley, Commissioner of Police, Gambia.
- John Beaufoy James Birch, Assistant Commissioner of Police, Federated Malay States.
- Edgar Charles Tidy, Assistant Commissioner of Police, Federated Malay States.
- Wong Kee Fook, Detective Sub-Inspector of Police, Federated Malay States.
- Major Charles Ponsonby Widdup VD Deputy Inspector-General of Police, British Guiana.
- Colonel Arthur Stephen Mavrogordato OBE Inspector-General of Constabulary, Trinidad and Tobago.

=== Imperial Service Medal (ISM) ===
Australia

- Mort McMillan, Principal Attendant, House of Representatives, Commonwealth Parliament.
- Robert Mitchell, Housekeeper, Commonwealth Parliament.
- Frederick Sparkes, Housekeeper, Commonwealth Parliament.

British India

- Asgar All, retired Jemadar, Burma Secretariat.
- Shaik Golap, Laminating Department, His Majesty's Mint, Calcutta, Bengal (retired).
- Sheik Gudmiah, retired Peon, District Forest Office, Central Salem, Madras.
- Tanjore Sivasami Rao Sundaresa Rao, retired Duffadar, Office of the Board of Revenue, Land Revenue and Settlement, Madras.

=== Royal Red Cross (RRC) ===
First Class

- Head Sister Bertha Marion Martin ARRC Queen Alexandra's Royal Naval Nursing Service.

=== Air Force Cross ===
- Flight Lieutenant Oliver Eric Carter.
- Flight Lieutenant Leonard Somerville Snaith.
- Flying Officer Singleton Powell Richards.
