= William Gibson (disambiguation) =

William Gibson (born 1948) is an American-Canadian science fiction author.

William Gibson may also refer to:

== Sports ==
- Will Gibson (1869–1911), Scottish footballer with Sunderland
- Billy Gibson (boxing) (1876–1947), boxing promoter and manager
- William Gibson (footballer, born 1876) (1876–?), Irish footballer who played for Sunderland AFC
- William Gibson (1920s footballer), Scottish football player
- William Gibson (footballer, born 1926) (1926–1995), Scottish footballer who played for Tranmere Rovers
- William Gibson (ice hockey) (1927–2006), Canadian hockey player
- Bill Gibson (basketball) (c. 1928–1975), American basketball coach
- Willie Gibson (footballer, born 1898) (1898–1992), Scottish footballer who played for Newcastle United
- Willie Gibson (footballer, born 1953), Scottish footballer for Hearts, Partick Thistle, Raith Rovers and Cowdenbeath
- Billy Gibson (footballer, born 1981), Scottish footballer who played for Partick Thistle
- Willie Gibson (footballer, born 1984), Scottish footballer who is currently player-manager for Queen of the South
- Billy Gibson (footballer, born 1990), English footballer who played for Yeovil Town
- William Gibson (rugby union) (1865–1924), Scottish rugby union player

== Politicians ==
- William Gibson-Craig (1797–1878), Scottish advocate and politician
- William Gibson (Dundas County, Ontario politician) (1815–1890), Canadian Independent Liberal member of parliament
- William Harvey Gibson (1821–1894), Republican politician and American Union Army general
- William J. Gibson (died 1863), Wisconsin state senator who died in the Civil War
- W. C. Gibson (William Charles Gibson), Accountant General and Controller of Revenue of Ceylon, 1851–1861
- William Gibson (Lincoln, Ontario politician) (1849–1914), Canadian Liberal Party of Canada member of parliament and senator
- William Gibson (Ulster Unionist Party politician) (1859/60–?), member of the Senate of Northern Ireland
- William Gibson, 2nd Baron Ashbourne (1868–1942), Anglo-Irish member of parliament
- William Gibson (Australian politician) (1869–1955), Australian politician
- William Kennedy Gibson (1876–1949), Irish footballer and politician
- William L. Gibson (1906–1987), member of the Florida House of Representatives

== Religion ==
- William Gibson (martyr) (1548–1596), English Catholic martyr
- William Gibson (archdeacon of Essex) (1717–1754), canon of Windsor and archdeacon of Essex
- William Gibson (bishop) (1738–1821), Vicar Apostolic of the Northern District of England
- William Gibson (minister) (1806–1867), Irish Presbyterian minister
- William Gibson (dean of Ferns), dean of Ferns from 1932 to 1936

== Arts and entertainment ==
- William Hamilton Gibson (1850–1896), American illustrator, author and naturalist
- William Gibson (producer) (1869–1929), Australian film producer and exhibitor
- William Gibson (playwright) (1914–2008), American playwright, author of The Miracle Worker
- Bill Gibson (drummer) (born 1951), drummer for Huey Lewis and the News
- Bill Gibson (music producer) (born 1955), American music producer

== Other ==
- William Gibson (painter) (1644–1702), English miniature painter
- William Sidney Gibson (1814–1871), English barrister and antiquarian
- William H. Gibson (educator) (1829–1906), American educator and civil rights activist
- William Pettigrew Gibson (1902–1960), Scottish art historian, Wallace Collection, Courtauld Institute of Art, National Gallery
- William Willard Gibson Jr. (1932–2026), American lawyer and academic
- William Gibson (NAACP activist) (1933–2002), American dentist and chairman of NAACP
- William Clyde Gibson (born 1957), American convicted serial killer
- William Gibson (historian) (born 1959), British historian, academic, writer, and professor
- William Sumner Gibson (1876–1946), British barrister and colonial administrator
