= MacMurchy =

MacMurchy is a surname. Notable people with the surname include:

- Gordon MacMurchy (1926–2005), Canadian politician
- Helen MacMurchy (1862–1953), Canadian doctor and author
- Ryan MacMurchy (born 1983), Canadian ice hockey player
