= Aubrey Oxlade =

Australian cricket administrator

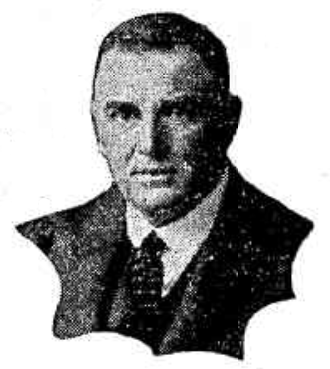
Aubrey Oxlade in 1935

Robert Aubrey Oxlade CBE (16 February 1882 – 13 September 1955) was an Australian cricket administrator.

Oxlade was born in Sydney in 1882, the son of Robert Oxlade (1855–1920) and Sara Stanton (1851–1926).

He joined Manly Warringah District Cricket Club as a player in 1910, and was later president of the club. He also acted as the club delegate to the New South Wales Cricket Association. He was later the treasurer and secretary of the Australian Board of Control for International Cricket and served as chairman from 1927 to 1930, 1933 to 1936, 1945 to 1948, and 1951 to 1952. For his services as board chairman, he was awarded the rank of Commander of the Order of the British Empire (CBE) in the 1934 New Year Honours. and was formally invested by the Governor-General Sir Isaac Isaacs at Government House, Sydney, on 3 May 1934.

Oxlade worked as a solicitor. He married Charlotte Nellie Broad in 1911.
