= Kenneth Buchanan =

British Army officer

Major-General Sir Kenneth Buchanan CB CMG DSO
- Born: 25 January 1880; Lanark, Scotland
- Died: 7 June 1973 (aged 93); Swindon, Wiltshire
- Military career
- Allegiance: United Kingdom
- Branch: British Army
- Rank: Major-General
- Service number: 4776
- Commands: 154th Infantry Brigade; 42nd (East Lancashire) Infantry Division
- Conflicts: First World War
- Awards: Knight Bachelor; Companion of the Order of the Bath; Companion of the Order of St Michael and St George; Distinguished Service Order

Major-General Sir Kenneth Gray Buchanan, CB, CMG, DSO (25 January 1880 – 7 June 1973) was a British Army officer.

== Military career ==
Buchanan was commissioned as a second lieutenant into the Seaforth Highlanders on 20 January 1900. He was promoted to lieutenant on 21 January 1901.

He was seconded for service on the staff in April 1904 and made an aide-de-camp to the governor of Victoria, Major General Reginald Talbot. He was again seconded for service on the staff in February 1906 and in May was appointed an adjutant.

He was made a staff captain in April 1912.

He saw action on the Western Front during the First World War and was briefly an adjutant of the 8th (Service) Battalion, Seaforth Highlanders, a Kitchener's Army unit, in September before being appointed as an aide-de-camp in October. He was again made a staff captain in November 1914 and yet again in April 1915 and finally a brigade major in June, succeeding Archibald Wavell, later a field marshal. He was appointed a Companion of the Distinguished Service Order in January 1916 and on 28 August 1916 was made a general staff officer, grade 2 (GSO2). He was made a brevet lieutenant colonel on 1 January 1917 and became general officer commanding (GOC) of the 154th Infantry Brigade, part of the Territorial Force (TF) 51st (Highland) Division, in September 1917 and was made a temporary brigadier general while employed in this role. His service in the war also earned him an appointment as a Companion of the Order of St Michael and St George.

Buchanan was appointed as a general staff officer, grade 1 (GSO1), at the Staff College, Camberley, on 1 September 1920. He was promoted in July 1922 to brevet colonel, and in January 1923 to lieutenant colonel, was appointed in February 1923 as a GSO1 at the War Office in London. Placed one more on half-pay on 10 January 1927, and promoted to colonel on 19 January, with seniority backdated to 1 January 1921, he then went on to become a GSO1 with Northern Command in June 1928 and commander of the 2nd Infantry Brigade in March 1930, for which he was raised to the temporary rank of brigadier while employed in this role.

He was promoted to substantive major general on 5 September 1932 but remained in command of his brigade until 2 December when he relinquished command and was immediately placed on half-pay.

After being appointed a Companion of the Order of the Bath in the 1934 New Year Honours, he became GOC of the 42nd (East Lancashire) Infantry Division of the Territorial Army (TA) in March 1934. He held this position for the next four years until relinquishing command in March 1938 and retiring from the army in March 1938.

He was appointed a Knight Bachelor in the 1946 New Year Honours for his work as Secretary of the Council of Voluntary War Work during the Second World War.

Military offices
Preceded by Hugh Elles	GOC 42nd (East Lancashire) Infantry Division; 1934–1938	Succeeded by William Holmes
