= A. R. Wellington =

British physician (1877–1961)

A. R. Wellington CMG MRCS LRCP
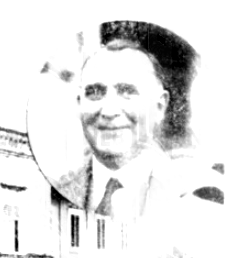
- Wellington in 1929
- Born: Arthur Robartes Wellington; 24 November 1877; Meaford, Ontario
- Died: 26 October 1961 (aged 83)
- Education: Kelly College
- Occupations: Physician and colonial medical administrator

Arthur Robartes Wellington (24 November 1877 – 26 October 1961) was a British physician and colonial medical administrator who served as Chief Health Officer of the Federated Malay States and Director of Medical Services of Hong Kong.

== Early life and education ==
Wellington was born in Meaford, Ontario, on 24 November 1877, the son of J. C. Wellington. He was educated at Kelly College, Tavistock and St Mary's Hospital, London.

== Career ==
After completing his education in 1902, Wellington joined the Sarawak Medical Service. After his wife became ill, he transferred to Singapore where he was appointed health officer of Saint John's Island which was used as a quarantine centre for Singapore. In 1908, he joined the medical service of the Federated Malay States, working in Selangor and Perak, and rose to the position of Chief Health Officer of the Federated Malay States, a post he held until 1929. Described as one of Malaya's best known anti-malarial workers, "His contribution to the health of Malaya was great, particularly in measures against malaria, typhus and venereal disease."

In 1929, Wellington transferred to Hong Kong where he served as Director of Medical Services of the Colony, until his retirement in 1937 when he was succeeded in the post by Selwyn Selwyn-Clarke. In 1929, he was appointed a member of the Hong Kong Legislative Council. During his tenure, he reorganised the health services of the Colony and on retirement it was reported that, "the comparative freedom of the great port from major diseases during the past five years is a tribute to his work." He settled in Nice but after the German invasion of France in 1940 returned to England via Spain and Portugal, and worked at the Ministry of Health until 1948, before returning to Nice.

Wellington was a founder member of the Royal Society of Tropical Medicine and Hygiene. He served as president of the British Medical Association's branch in Malaya. He represented Malaya and Hong Kong at international conferences and was a delegate at meetings of the Health Organisation of the League of Nations.

== Personal life and death ==
Wellington married "Queenie" Helden in 1904. She died in 1958. Wellington died at Nice on 26 October 1961, aged 83.

== Honours ==
Wellington was appointed Companion of the Order of St Michael and St George (CMG) in the 1934 New Year Honours.

A mosquito and a louse were named after him in recognition of his contributions to the study of malaria and typhus.
