= Alwyn Sidney Haynes =

British colonial administrator and agriculturalist (1878-1963)

Alwyn Sidney Haynes CMG OBE
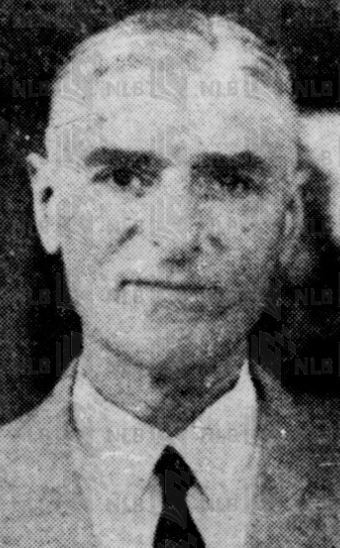
- 1936

British Adviser Kelantan
- In office 1930–1933
- Preceded by: Reginald John Byard Clayton
- Succeeded by: Alan Custance Baker

Personal details
- Born: 22 October 1878
- Died: 9 May 1963 (aged 84)
- Children: 1 son and 2 daughters
- Occupation: Colonial administrative service officer and agriculturalist

Alwyn Sidney Haynes CMG OBE (22 October 1878 – 9 May 1963) was a British colonial administrator and agriculturalist in the Federated Malay States and the Straits Settlements.

== Early life and education ==
Haynes was born on 22 October 1878. He was educated at Haileybury College, Hertfordshire.

== Career ==
Harnes joined the Federated Malay States Civil Service in 1901 as a cadet and went to Singapore in 1902. He served in a number of different capacities including Treasurer of Krian District (1902); Official Administrator of the estate of Dato Panglima Kinta (1905); assistant District Officer, Kuala Kangsar (1906); assistant superintendent of Immigrants, Penang (1909); District Officer, Kuala Kangsar (1915); and District Officer, Tampin (1916); In 1920, he took up his first substantive appointment as Secretary to High Commissioner for Malay States. In 1922, he was appointed Secretary for Agriculture of the Straits Settlements and Federated Malay States, and Director of Food Production.

He served as acting British Resident, Pahang in 1924 and 1926; acting British Resident, Perak in 1925; and British Adviser, Kedah in 1925. In 1927, he was appointed a Member of the Imperial Council of Agricultural Research and represented Malaya at the Council's Research Conference in London. In 1928, he was appointed District Officer, Lower Perak, and Secretary for Postal Affairs of the Straits Settlements and Federated Malay States, and in 1930 he was Controller of Labour, Malaya. He then served as British Adviser, Kelantan in 1930–1933, and in 1933 was appointed Colonial Secretary in Singapore, and at the same time was sworn in as a Member of the Executive and Legislative Councils, Straits Settlements.

After returning to England, he became a lecturer on the Malay language and on Far Eastern Countries at Oxford for the Colonial Administrative Service Course and remained in the position from 1935 to 1940. He toured Asia as Chairman of a League of Nations Commission on Rural Hygiene in the Far East in 1936. In 1937, he was attached to the Board of Advisers on the Malay language at the University of London, and lectured on Malay at the School for Oriental and African Studies. The same year he was a delegate to the Intergovernmental Conference of Eastern Nations on Rural Hygiene in Java.

He was Chairman of the Warwick County Magistrates’ Bench and a JP for the County of Warwick. He was Vice-President of the Royal Empire Society, and an Honorary Life Fellow of the Royal Colonial Institute (now the Royal Commonwealth Society), and served as a member of its Council in 1934 and 1939-1954.

Haynes published various articles on colonial administrative subjects, and for the League of Nations and the World Health Organisation.

== Personal life and death ==
Haynes married Susanna Legler in 1911 and they one son and two daughters. He died on 9 May 1963.

== Honours ==
Haynes was appointed Companion of the Order of St Michael and St George (CMG) in the 1934 New Year Honours. He was appointed Officer of the Order of the British Empire (OBE) in the 1950 Birthday Honours.
