= William Sumner Gibson =

British barrister and colonial administrator (1876-1946)

The Honourable William Sumner Gibson CMG
- Born: 21 June 1876
- Died: 7 August 1946 (age 70)
- Education: Keble College, Oxford
- Occupations: Barrister, colonial administrator and judge
- Children: 1 son

William Sumner Gibson CMG (21 June 1876 – 7 August 1946) was a British barrister, colonial administrator and judge in British Malaya.

== Early life and education ==
Gibson was born on 21 June 1876, the son of Edgar Gibson, Bishop of Gloucester. He was educated at Marlborough College and at Keble College, Oxford where, in 1899, he received his BA (Hons) in Modern History.

== Career ==
Gibson joined the Colonial Service in 1899 as a cadet, and held various appointments including Protector of Chinese (1911–1915). In 1915, having been called to the Bar by Lincoln's Inn in 1913, he joined the legal branch of the service and was appointed a judge in Kedah, remaining in the post until 1919, and in the following year, was acting Deputy Public Prosecutor. In 1922, he served as President of the Retrenchment Commission to inquire into the organisation of various government departments.

From 1922 to 1933, Gibson served in the post of Legal Adviser to the Federated Malay States Government. During his term of office, he drafted and presented to the federal government a considerable amount of new legislation. He also published: A Handbook for Magistrates for the Federated Malay States (1930), and The Laws of the Federated Malay States in Force 31 December 1934. One of his most notable cases was to act as counsel for the State of Pahang in an action brought against it by Pahang Consolidated Co in 1932. As Legal Adviser to the government, he also sat as a member of the Federal Council of Malaya, and oversaw the signing of a new treaty defining the constitution of the Federal Council signed by the Rulers of the Federated Malay States.

In 1933, after retiring from service, he was appointed Chairman of the Colony Trade Commission to inquire into and report on the trade of Malaya. After returning to England, he was admitted as a solicitor in 1938, and set up in private practice in Truro, Cornwall.

== Personal life and death ==
Gibson married Dorothea Rapley in 1925 and they had a son.

Gibson died on 7 August 1946, aged 70.

== Honours ==
Gibson was appointed Companion of the Order of St Michael and St George (CMG) in the 1934 New Year Honours.
