= Sir Kenneth Lee, 1st Baronet =

English businessman and civil servant (1879 – 1967)

Sir Kenneth Lee
- Born: 1879
- Died: 1967 (aged 87–88)
- Occupation: Businessman

Sir Kenneth Lee, 1st Baronet (1879 – 18 October 1967) was an English businessman and civil servant.

Born in 1879, his family were "long connected with the cotton industry". His grandfather Henry Lee had founded the cotton manufacturer Tootal Broadhurst Lee and his father Harold Lee, JP (died 1936) had been a senior executive in the company. Lee was involved in the company's management by the late 1900s, when he met the American soprano Giulia Strakosch (daughter of the impresario Max Strakosch) while he was in the United States on business; they married in London in 1910. Lee was subsequently chairman and president of his family's business. He was pioneered the use of scientific research in the industry and played a role in inventing crease-resistant processes.

He was elected to membership of the Manchester Literary and Philosophical Society in 1917.

During the First World War, Lee sat on the Imperial Shipping Committee and government advisory committees on trade, industry and patents. From 1925, he was a member of the commission investigating the coal industry. He was knighted in 1934. When the Second World War broke out, he was appointed Director-General of the Ministry of Information in 1939, serving until 1940. In 1940, he was a member of the UK's trade mission to South America and in 1941 was appointed one of the Board of Trade's representatives in the US. He was created a baronet in 1941 and died on 18 October 1967.
