= William Pettigrew Gibson =

William Pettigrew Gibson (3 January 1902 - 22 April 1960) was a Scottish-born art historian and art gallery curator. He worked as Assistant Keeper of the Wallace Collection, London, from 1927, was Reader in the History of Art at the University of London and Deputy Director of the Courtauld Institute of Art from 1936, and Keeper of the National Gallery from 1939 to 1960.

== Early life and education ==
His father was Edwin Arthur Gibson (1870-1946), a physician, and his mother was Ellen Shaw Gibson (née Pettigrew, 1869-1945). He had an elder sister, Margaret Ellen Gibson (1900-1964) and a younger brother, James Arthur Walker Gibson (1903-1968). He was educated at Westminster School, London, then studied natural sciences and physiology at Christ Church, Oxford, graduating with a BSc in 1924.

== Professional work ==
Although Gibson had originally planned to go into medicine like his father, he became interested in art history through an Oxford friend, the archaeologist Humfry Payne, who later directed the British School at Athens. He was appointed Assistant Keeper and lecturer at the Wallace Collection in 1927. In 1936 he became a Reader in the History of Art at the University of London, and in the same year was appointed Deputy Director of the Courtauld Institute of Art. He became acquainted with Kenneth Clark, Director of the National Gallery, who appointed him Keeper of the National Gallery in 1939. Gibson specialised in 18th century French art. During the Second World War he spent long periods on firewatch duty, day and night, at the National Gallery, although the art collection itself had been moved away from London for safekeeping.

== Publications ==
=== Books ===
- Gibson, W. P (1930). Three lectures upon French painting. London: Printed for H.M.S.O. and sold at Hertford House. OCLC 681828257.
- Hertford House (LONDON); GIBSON, William Pettigrew (1935). Wallace Collection Catalogues. Miniatures and illuminations. Text, with historical notes and illustrations, by W.P. Gibson. Pl. 55. London. OCLC 562069698.
- Hepworth, Barbara; Gibson, William Pettigrew; Browse, Lillian (1964). Barbara Hepworth, sculptress. London: Pub. for the Shenval Press by Faber and Faber Limited. OCLC 1688850.

=== Articles ===
- Gibson, William (1928). "The Holford collection". Apollo: 197–204. ISSN 0003-6536. OCLC 888289444.
- Gibson, William (1928). "The Six sale at Amsterdam". Apollo: 239–243. ISSN 0003-6536. OCLC 888289445.
- Gibson, William (1928). "Mr. John Robart's collection of pictures". Apollo: 113–119. ISSN 0003-6536. OCLC 888289574.
- Gibson, William (1928). "Thomas Gainsborough, R.A. (born 1727, died 1788)". Apollo: 71–74. ISSN 0003-6536. OCLC 888289589.
- Gibson, William (1929). "The Dutch exhibition at Burlington House". Apollo: 1–12. ISSN 0003-6536. OCLC 888289547.
- Gibson, William (1930). "The italian drawings at Burlington House". Apollo: 171–178. ISSN 0003-6536. OCLC 888289538.
- Gibson, William (1930). "The Renaissance drawings at Burlington House". Apollo: 24–29. ISSN 0003-6536. OCLC 888289507.
- Gibson, William (1930). "On Watteau's draughtsmanship". Apollo: 275–279. ISSN 0003-6536. OCLC 888289452.
- Gibson, William (1948). "The Paul Nash memorial exhibition". Burlington Magazine: 119–120. ISSN 0007-6287. OCLC 888289518.
- Gibson, William (1952). "Nicholas Egon: an appreciation". Apollo: 110–111. ISSN 0003-6536. OCLC 888289517.

== Family ==
Gibson married Christina Pamela Ogilvy in 1940. In the late 1940s they moved to Wyddial Hall, a 16th century country house in East Hertfordshire, which became a Grade II* listed building in October 1951. They lived a simple life there without a telephone or radio. Gibson died unexpectedly at the age of 58, on 22 April 1960, at University College Hospital, London. His obituary appeared in The Times on 23 April 1960 (p. 8).
