= William Sidney Gibson =

English barrister and antiquarian (1814–1871)

- Born: 1814; Parson's Green, Fulham
- Died: 3 January 1871 (aged 56–57); London, England
- Resting place: Tynemouth Priory Churchyard
- Occupation: Barrister
- Known for: Antiquarian

William Sidney Gibson (1814–1871) was an English barrister and antiquarian.

== Life ==
Born at Parson's Green, Fulham, Gibson was for some years on the staff of a Carlisle newspaper. He entered Lincoln's Inn, and was called to the bar the society in 1843. The same year he was appointed registrar of the Newcastle upon Tyne district court of bankruptcy.

When the Bankruptcy Act 1869 (32 & 33 Vict. c. 71) abolished this and other similar courts, Gibson retired on a pension, and concentrated on writing. He died at the Grosvenor Hotel, Belgravia London, 3 January 1871, and was interred in the disused burial-ground of the Old Priory, Tynemouth, by special permission. He was an honorary M.A. of Durham University, and a fellow of the Society of Antiquaries of London and other learned societies.

== Works ==
Gibson wrote:

- The Certainties of Geology, 1840.
- Prize Essay on the History and Antiquities of Highgate, 1842 (written for a Highgate society).
- The History of the Monastery founded at Tynemouth in the Diocese of Durham, 2 vols., 1846–7.
- An Essay on the Filial Duties, 1848.
- A Letter to the Lord Chancellor on the Amendment of the Law of Bankruptcy, 1848.
- Descriptive and Historical Notices of some remarkable Northumbrian Castles, Churches, and Antiquities, in a Series of Visits to the ruined Priory of Finchale, the Abbey Church of Hexham, &c., with Biographical Notices of Eminent Persons (three series, 1848–54; the second series was Dilston Hall.)
- Remarks on the Mediæval Writers on English History, intended as a popular Sketch of the Advantages and Pleasures derivable from Monastic Literature, 1848.
- Marvels of the Globe, two lectures, 1856.
- Lectures and Essays, two series, 1858–63.
- A Memoir of Northumberland, descriptive of its Scenery, Monuments, and History, 1860, and, in a different form, 1862.
- Descriptive and Historical Guide to Tynemouth, with Notices of North Shields, Tynemouth and North Shields, 1861.
- A Memoir of Lord Lyndhurst, 1866; new edition, 1869.

Gibson also wrote A Memoir of the Life of Richard de Bury, Bishop of Durham, articles for Colburn's New Monthly Magazine, Dickens' Household Words and other periodicals, and was an early contributor to Notes and Queries.
