= Sarah Hynes =

Australian botanist and teacher

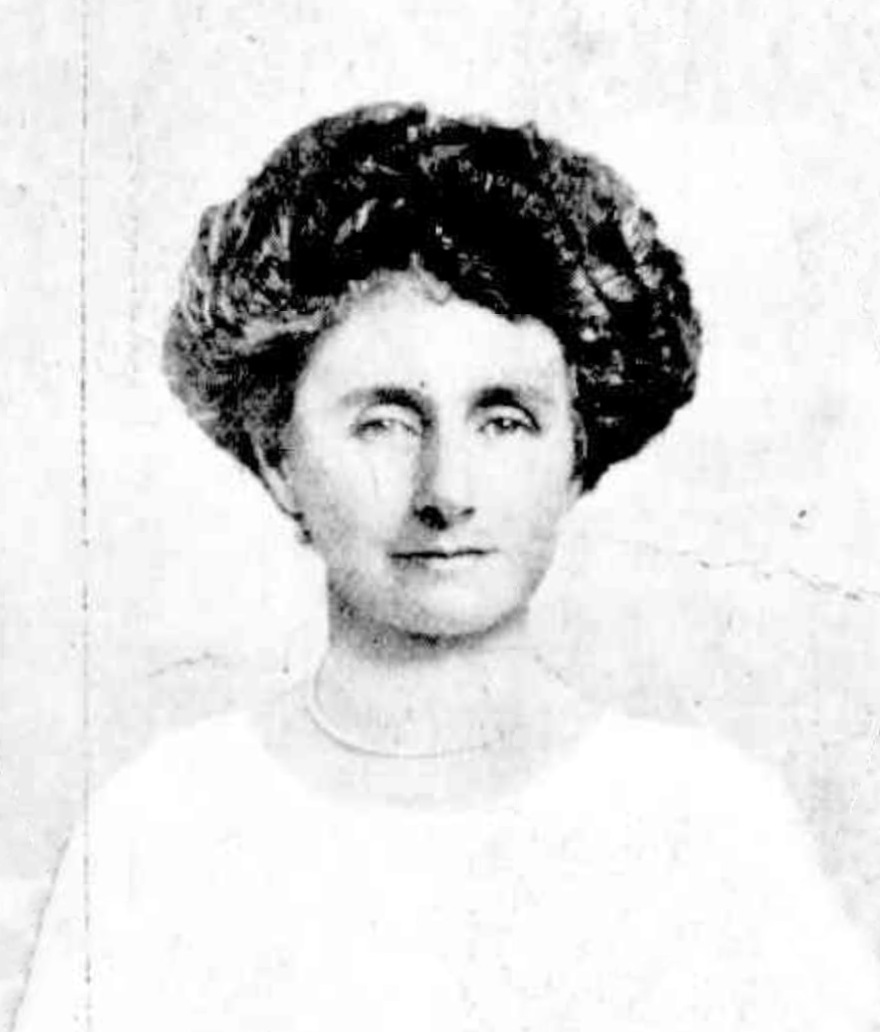
Sarah Hynes in 1911

Sarah (Sally) Hynes MBE (30 September 1859 – 27 May 1938) was a Kingdom of Prussia-born, Australian botanist and teacher.

== Family ==
Sarah (Sally) Hynes was born on 30 September 1859 in Danzig, Prussia (now Gdansk, Poland) to master mariner William John Hynes (1831–1909), and his wife Eliza Adeline Bell (1837–1895). She never married, taking on the care of her older, mentally disabled sister, Eliza Adeline Hynes (1857-1947).

== Education ==
Sarah was educated at Edinburgh Ladies' College, Upton House in St John's Wood, London, and at Bishop Otter College, Chichester in Sussex. She earned a botanical certificate from South Kensington Museum, Science and Art Department.

Hynes came to Sydney around 1884 when her father took a job as managing director of the Australasian Steam Navigation Company. She enrolled at the University of Sydney in 1888, studied the sciences, majored in botany, and graduated Bachelor of Arts (B.A.) on 11 April 1891.

Hynes was the first woman to be appointed to the Linnean Society of New South Wales, in 1892. She was also active on the fund-raising committee which was working toward the construction of the university's Women's College.

== Career ==
Hynes began teaching at Sydney Technical College in 1897. After helping to supply the Sydney Technological Museum with flowers for their botanical display with friend Georgina King, she was offered a job as a botanical assistant at the museum, becoming in 1898 the first woman to hold a government position in the sciences in New South Wales. When her mentor, Joseph Maiden, took a job as director of the Botanic Gardens, Hynes transferred to its herbarium, where she was responsible for identifying, classifying and preserving specimens for public display, education or further analysis. She was also responsible for teaching classes. Hynes clashed with many of her male colleagues, over a number of issues, including pay, and was suspended in 1905. While the charges were disproved, she was again suspended in 1910, leading to her transfer to the Department of Public Instruction.

Hynes taught at Cleveland St School in 1913, followed by Petersham. She taught at St George Girls’ High School from 1916 to 1923, at which point she retired from teaching.

== Later life ==
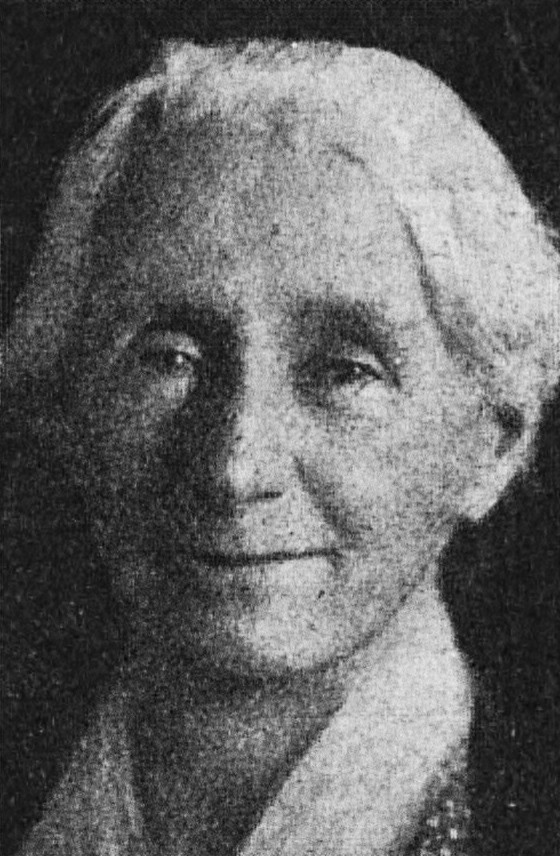
Sarah Hynes in 1932

Hynes was an active political feminist, with strong opinions. She maintained her father's connection to the National Association, and maintained her own within the Randwick branch of the same. She was a member of the United Australia association. She led a campaign in 1921 which appealed successfully to the federal government to purchase the paintings of her friend, Ellis Rowan. She was later instrumental in raising funds to commission a portrait of Rowan by Sir John Longstaff, which became part of the collection. In 1928 she lobbied state government approval for the appointment of volunteer rangers to safeguard 29 protected species from damage.

She was a founder of the Forum Club in Sydney, and its Senior Vice-president in 1933. She was awarded an MBE in 1934.

== Death ==
Hynes died on 27 May 1938 at her home in Randwick, and was buried in Waverley Cemetery.

== Legacy ==
- Hynes worked with Joseph Maiden on his book, Forest Flora. William Vincent Fitzgerald named a species after her in 1912, Acacia hynesiana. The Powerhouse Museum holds ephemera from Hynes. The University of Sydney Archives also holds material relating to Hynes.
- On 15 October 1939, a memorial plaque was unveiled at St Jude's Church, Randwick by the federal politician John Jennings.
- In 1978 a street in the Canberra suburb of Chisholm was named Hynes Place in recognition of her work as a botanist and first woman member of the Linnean Society of New South Wales.

== Works ==
- 1922: "Mrs Ellis Rowan: An Appreciation", The Sydney Morning Herald, (Tuesday, 10 October 1922), p. 8.
- 1929: "Mr. W.V. Fitzgerald: Explorer and Botanist's Death", The Sydney Morning Herald, (Wednesday, 14 August 1929), p. 16.
