= Helen MacMurchy =

Canadian doctor and author

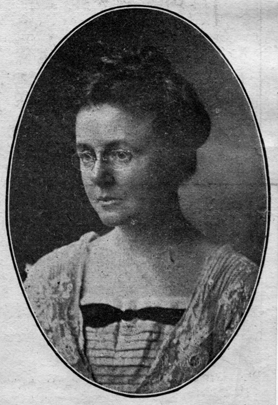
- Helen MacMurchy
- Born: Helen MacMurchy; May 20, 1862; Toronto, Canada West
- Died: October 8, 1953 (aged 91); Toronto, Ontario, Canada
- Education: University of Toronto (BA); University of Toronto Faculty of Medicine (MD, 1901)
- Occupations: Physician; public health reformer
- Known for: Child welfare reforms; early public health programs in Ontario
- Medical career
- Field: Public health; maternal health
- Institutions: Ontario Department of Health

Helen MacMurchy CBE (7 January 1862 – 8 October 1953) was a Canadian medical doctor, writer, a pioneer in the medical field, and a eugenicist.

== Biography ==
MacMurchy, the daughter of Archibald MacMurchy, graduated with first class honour in medicine and surgery in 1901 from the University of Toronto. She interned at Toronto General Hospital, the first woman to do so. She was also the first woman to take postgraduate work under William Osler at Johns Hopkins Hospital in Baltimore.

Some of MacMurchy's most important work included surveys of the high infant death rates experienced in cities at the turn of the century, such as 230 deaths for 1000 live births in Toronto, 1909. She resolved to combat this issue, partially because she feared the White Race was dying out. However, her extensive work in improving maternal health benefited women across Canada and worldwide through her books that talked about new techniques such as sterilization of bottles, pasteurization, and handwashing.

In 1914 MacMurchy wrote A Little Talk about the Baby, a book that mixed scholarly research with common sense. This book soon became known to all Canadian mothers. Her "Little Blue Books" would be published in dozens of languages, including Cree, until her retirement in 1934, and sold millions of copies. They encouraged good hygiene, stay-at-home mothers, and the importance of breastfeeding. One of her most quoted statements is "when the mother works, the baby dies."

It has been documented that MacMurchy held extreme dehumanizing and racist beliefs. She was a vocal and active eugenicist and in 1913 was appointed the "Inspector of the Feeble-Minded" in Ontario. Her actions led to the institutionalization and sterilization of the "feeble-minded", a pseudo-scientific category that stood in for the racialized, poor, immoral, mentally ill and otherwise undesirable persons. MacMurchy worked closely with the Women's Branch of the Immigration and Colonization Department to ensure the careful monitoring of the population. White female social workers were trained in the surveillance of the population with a particular focus on immigrant communities. Their occupation was professionalized partly because of "the need to have trained experts police new arrivals."

In the 1920s MacMurchy waged a campaign against the then high infant and maternal death rates. She made a special study of medical inspection of schools, child welfare and public health in England and in the United States. She would also become (for seven years) provincial inspector and assistant inspector of hospitals, prisons and charities.

== Legacy ==
=== Professional influence ===
MacMurchy is regarded as an early pioneer of maternal and child welfare policy in Canada and as one of the women physicians who helped expand professional opportunities for women in medicine.

Early in her career, MacMurchy was among the first women physicians to receive clinical hospital training in Canada and one of the first to serve as an intern at Toronto General Hospital, at a time when most hospitals did not admit women physicians for clinical training.

She later held a teaching position in obstetrics at the University of Toronto, making her one of the earliest women to teach medicine at the university.

From 1920 to 1934 MacMurchy served as chief of the Child Welfare Division of the federal Department of Health. In this role she became one of the first women in Canada to hold a senior position in federal public health administration and helped develop national programs addressing infant mortality, maternal health, and child welfare.

MacMurchy also contributed to the professional organization of women physicians. In 1924 she co-founded the Federation of Medical Women of Canada, which sought to support women physicians and promote women’s participation in medical education and practice.

Through her government work, publications, and public lectures, MacMurchy promoted the view that medicine should address the social conditions affecting health, including poverty, nutrition, housing, and maternal care. Her work helped shape early public health approaches linking medicine with social reform.

=== Honours and recognition ===
In 1934, MacMurchy was appointed a Commander of the Order of the British Empire in recognition of her contributions to maternal and child welfare and public health administration.

In 1949, she was named one of the ten leading women physicians in the western world for her work on maternal and child health.
