= Dallas Museum of Art =

Art museum in Dallas, Texas, U.S.

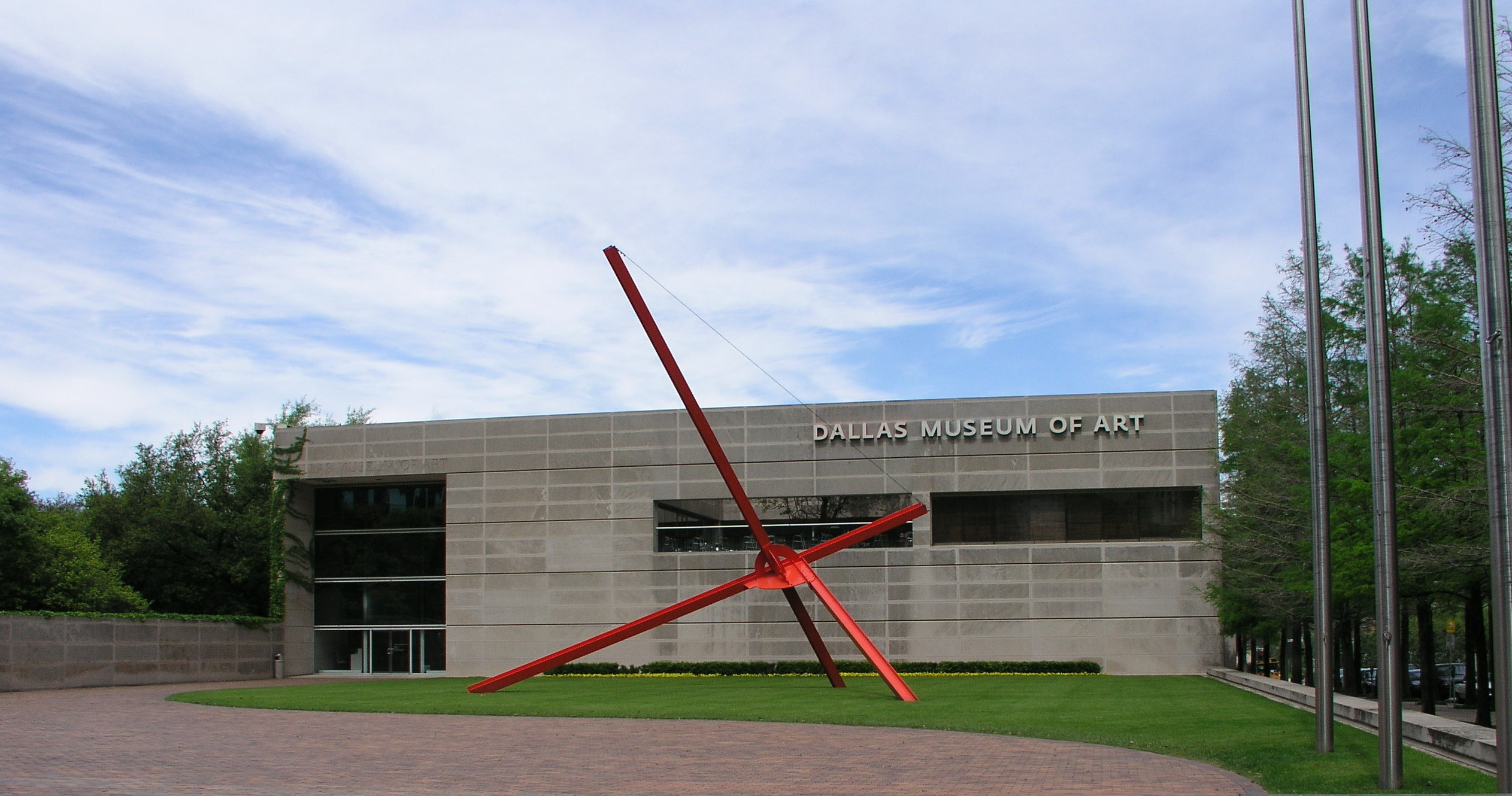
- Mark di Suvero, Ave, Dallas Museum of Art sculpture garden
- Interactive fullscreen map
- Established: 1903
- Location: 1717 N. Harwood Street, Dallas, Texas, U.S.
- Coordinates: 32°47′15″N 96°48′03″W
- Public transit access: DART: St. Paul Station, M-Line: St Paul & Woodall Rodgers, Olive & Flora
- Website: www.dma.org

The Dallas Museum of Art (DMA) is an art museum located in the Arts District of downtown Dallas, Texas, United States, along Woodall Rodgers Freeway between St. Paul and Harwood. In the 1970s, the museum moved from its previous location in Fair Park to the Arts District. The new building was designed by Edward Larrabee Barnes and John MY Lee Associates, the 2007 winner of the American Institute of Architects Gold Medal. The construction of the building spanned in stages over a decade.

The museum collection is made up of more than 24,000 objects, dating from the third millennium BC to the present day. It is known for its dynamic exhibition policy and educational programs. The Mildred R. and Frederick M. Mayer Library (the museum's non-circulating research library) contains over 50,000 volumes available to curators and the general public. With 159,000 square feet (14,800 m^{2}) of exhibition spaces, it is one of the largest art museums in the United States.

== History ==
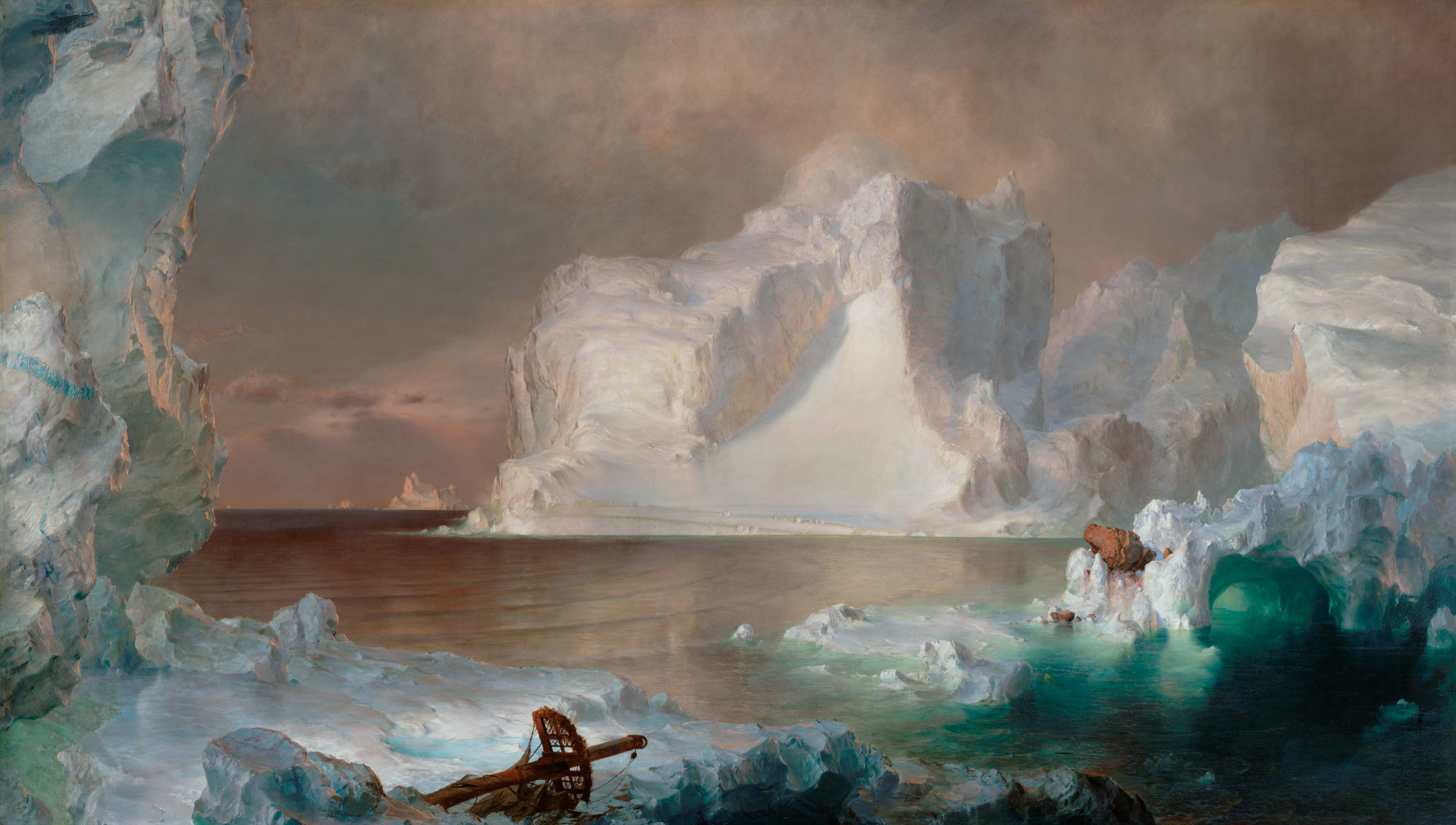
Frederic Edwin Church, The Icebergs, 1861

The museum's history began with the establishment in 1903 of the Dallas Art Association, which initially exhibited paintings in the Dallas Public Library. Frank Reaugh, a Texas artist, saw in the new library the opportunity to display works of art. This idea was championed by May Dickson Exall, who was the first president of the Dallas Public Library. Her intention was the following: “to offer art interest and education through exhibitions and lectures, to form a permanent collection, to sponsor the work of local artists, to solicit support of the arts from individuals and businesses, and to honor citizens who support the arts.”

With the expansion of the museum's collections, it soon became necessary to find a new permanent home. Renamed the Dallas Museum of Fine Arts in 1932, the museum relocated to a new art deco facility within Fair Park in 1936, on the occasion of the Texas Centennial Exposition. This new facility was designed by a consortium of Dallas architects in consultation with Paul Cret of Philadelphia. It is still possible to visit this building.

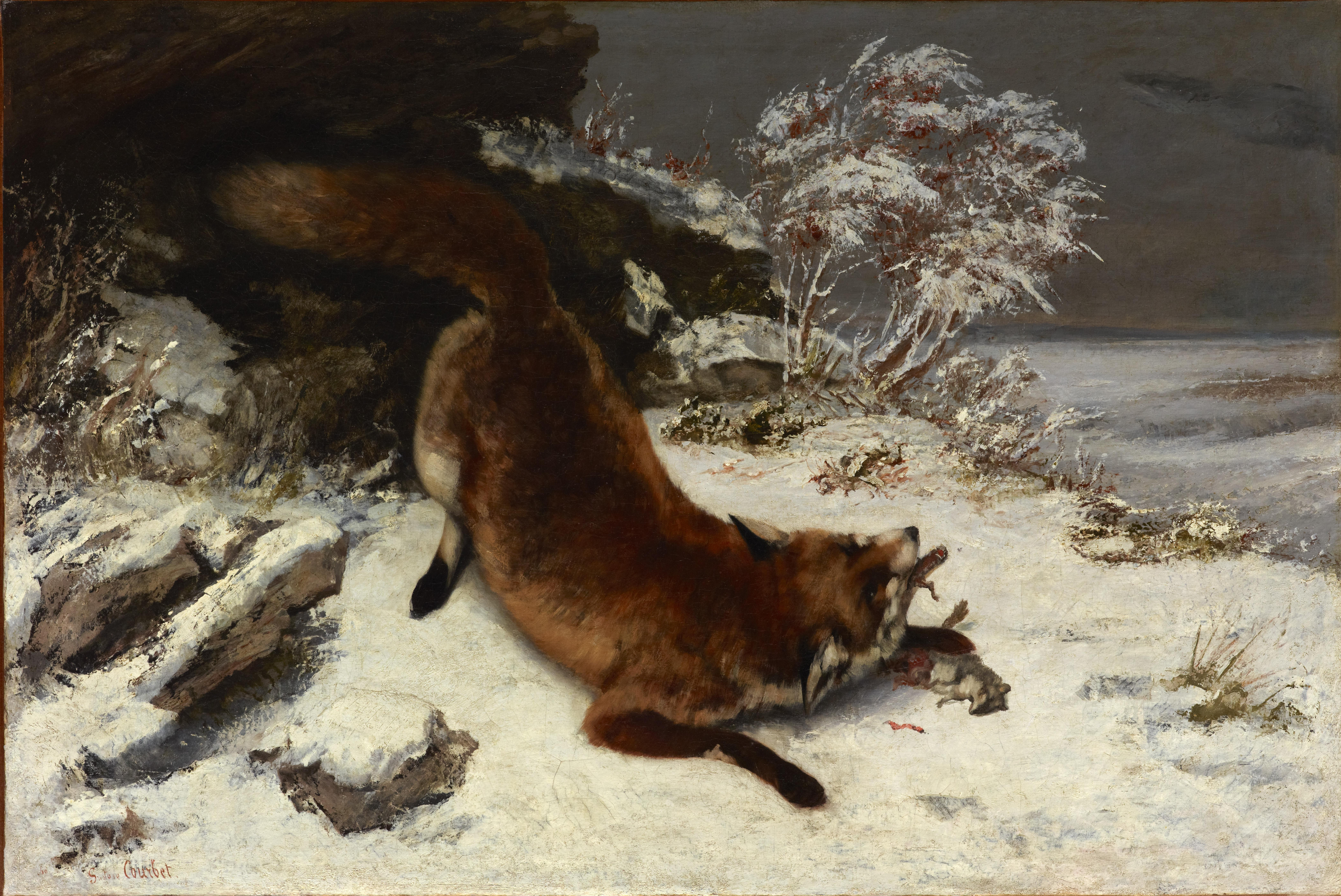
Gustave Courbet, Fox in the Snow, 1860

In 1943, Jerry Bywaters, artist and Professor at Southern Methodist University, became the director of the museum, a position he held for the next twenty-one years. Bywaters gave a sense of community to the museum, emphasized its Texas identity with works by Alexandre Hogue, Olin Herman Travis and Bywaters himself. Impressionist, Abstract, and contemporary masterpieces entered the museum's collections as well, contributing to its international aura.

The 1950s proved a tumultuous time for the DMA and Bywaters, as a local movement arose to purge the museum of pieces by "communist" artists, such as Pablo Picasso, whose work was banned.

In 1963, the Dallas Museum of Fine Arts merged with the Dallas Museum of Contemporary Art. In 1964 Merrill C. Rueppel became the director of the newly merged Museum, in replacement of the director of the four previous years, Douglas MacAgy. The permanent collections of the two museums, holding significant works by Paul Gauguin, Odilon Redon, Henri Matisse, Piet Mondrian, Gerald Murphy, and Francis Bacon were housed together within the DMFA facility. Two exhibitions of significance were held in 1965, The Art of Piet Mondrian and Sculpture: Twentieth Century.

By the late 1970s, the greatly enlarged permanent collection and the ambitious exhibition program fostered a need for a new museum facility. Under Harry Parker's direction, the museum was able to move once again, to its current venue, at the northern edge of the city's business district (the now designated Dallas Arts District). The $54 million facility, designed by New York architect Edward Larrabee Barnes, was financed by a 1979 City bond election, together with private donations. The project was galvanized by the slogan “A Great City Deserves a Great Museum,”. It opened in January 1984.

The DMA is part of the Monuments Men and Women Museum Network, launched in 2021 by the Monuments Men Foundation for the Preservation of Art.

On June 1, 2022, an individual by the name of Brian Hernandez broke into the museum by using a metal chair to smash through the museum's front entrance. He damaged four pieces of art, including three ancient Greek vases that were over 2,000 years old, as well as a ceramic bottle in the shape of a gar fish created by Native American artist.

In 2023, the museum announced that it had chosen the Spanish architecture firm Nieto Sobejano to lead a "reimagining" of its existing facility, with a budget estimated at between $150 million to $175 million. The goals of the renovation are to expand gallery space, improve visitor circulation flow and accessibility, increase the museum's physical visibility and transparency, and redesign the museum's grounds.

The museum named Brian Ferriso, the current director of the Portland Art Museum, as its next director in 2025.

== Collections ==
The museum's collections include more than 24,000 works of art from around the world ranging from ancient to modern times. They are conceived as a celebration of the human power of creation.

=== African ===
Objects in the museum's African collection come from West Africa and Central Africa. The objects date primarily from the 16th to the 20th centuries, although the earliest object is a Nok terracotta bust from Nigeria that dates from somewhere between 200 BC to 200 AD. Some works in the collection were created as symbols of leadership and status, while others express concepts related to the cycle of life. Highlights of the collection include a Benin plaque of copper alloy over wood depicting a warrior chief, a carved wood Senufo rhythm pounder from southeastern Mali, and a Congo standing power figure studded with ritually embedded iron nails or blades.

=== American ===
The American art collection includes paintings, sculptures, and works on paper from the United States from the colonial period to World War II, and art from Mexico, and Canada. Among the highlights of the collection are Duck Island (1906) by Childe Hassam, Lighthouse Hill (1927) by Edward Hopper, That Gentleman (1960) by Andrew Wyeth, Bare Tree Trunks with Snow (1946) by Georgia O'Keeffe and Razor and Watch by Gerald Murphy (1924, 1925). One of the most important pieces in the collection is The Icebergs (1861) by Frederic Edwin Church. The painting, gifted to the museum in 1979 by Norma and Lamar Hunt, had long been referred to as a lost masterpiece. Thanks to Jerry Bywaters, director of the DMA from to 1943 to 1964, who was also one of the Dallas Nine, an influential group of Texas artists, the Dallas Museum of Art also has one of the most thorough collections of Texas art, including works by Robert Jenkins Onderdonk, Julian Onderdonk, Alexandre Hogue, Clara McDonald Williamson, David Bates, Dorothy Austin, Michael Owen, and Olin Herman Travis.

=== Ancient Mediterranean ===
The Dallas Museum of Art collection of Ancient Mediterranean art includes Cycladic, Egyptian, Greek, Roman, Etruscan, and Apulian objects. Highlights of Egyptian art include a painted limestone Relief of a Procession of Offering Bearers from the Tomb of Ny-Ank-Nesut from 2575 to 2134 BC. The more extensive Greek collection includes a marble Figure of a man from a funerary relief from 300 BC, bronze sculptures, decorative objects, and gold jewelry. The art of ancient Rome is represented by a Figure of a woman from the 2nd century AD and a marble sarcophagus carved in high relief with a battle scene, c. 190 AD.

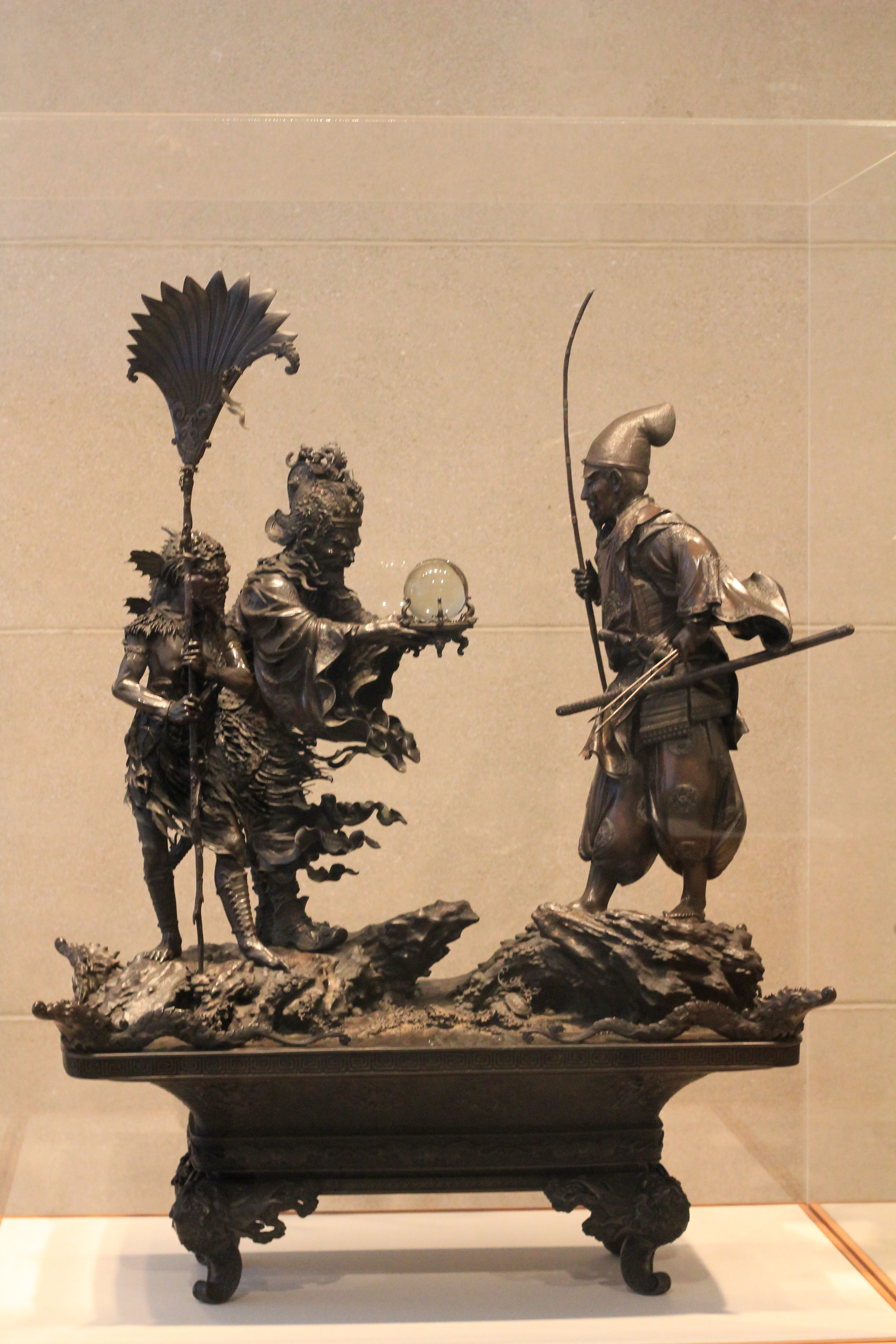
Takenouchi no Sukune Meets the Dragon King of the Sea, Japanese, Meiji period, 1879–81

=== Asian ===
The museum's collections of South Asian art range from Gandharan Buddhist art of the 2nd to 4th centuries AD to the arts of the Mughal Empire in India from the 15th to the 19th century. Highlights include a 12th-century bronze Shiva Nataraja and a 10th-century sandstone representation of the god Vishnu as the boar-headed Varaha. The arts of Tibet, Nepal, and Thailand are also represented.

=== Contemporary ===
Many important artistic trends since 1945 are represented in the museum's vast collection of contemporary art, from abstract expressionism to pop and op Art, and from minimalism, and conceptualism to installation art, assemblage, and video art. It includes works by Jackson Pollock, Mark Rothko, Franz Kline, Jasper Johns, Robert Rauschenberg, Bruce Nauman, and Robert Smithson, as well as Matthew Wong’s The West (2017). Among photographers represented in the collection are Cindy Sherman, Nic Nicosia, Thomas Struth, and Lynn Davis. When the current Museum facility opened in the mid-1980s, several artists were commissioned to create site-specific works especially for the Dallas Museum of Art: Ellsworth Kelly, Sol LeWitt, Richard Fleischner, and Claes Oldenburg with Coosje van Bruggen. In recent years, the museum has shown a strong interest in collecting the work of contemporary German artists such as Gerhard Richter, Sigmar Polke, and Anselm Kiefer.

The museum's 2022–2023 acquisitions included Pacita Abad's How Mali Lost Her Accent (1991), Honor Titus's My Baby's Breath (2022), and Chase Hall's A Portrait of a Young Sailor (2020).

=== Decorative Arts and Design ===
The expansive collections of Decorative Arts and Design feature over 8,000 works mostly from Europe and America in various media including furniture, ceramics, glass, textiles, and metalware. Among the earliest works in the collection are 16th-century Spanish textiles, 17th century Chinese export porcelain, and European metalware, including the Hoblitzelle Collection of English and Irish silver. Two early silver objects are a cup and cover (1742) by silversmith Paul de Lamerie and a large wine cistern (1761–62) by Abraham Portal for Francis Hastings, the 10th Earl of Huntingdon. American 18th-century furniture forms the core of the Faith P. and Charles L. Bybee Collection, featuring seating and case pieces from Boston, Connecticut, New York, Philadelphia and other regions. The internationally renowned 19th- and 20th-century American silver collection is considered the very finest of its type, with major examples by the leading firms of the last two centuries including Tiffany & Co., Gorham Manufacturing Company, Reed & Barton, and International Silver Co. In addition to a unique solid silver dressing table (1899) made by Gorham for the Paris Exposition Universelle of 1900, other highlights include a Gothic Revival bed (c. 1844) made for Henry Clay, a Herter Brothers sideboard (c. 1881–82) for William Henry Vanderbilt, a pair of Louis Comfort Tiffany stained glass windows (c. 1885-95) depicting an undersea scene, and a collection of Arts and Crafts movement and early modern designs by Gustav Stickley, Charles Rohlfs, Christopher Dresser, Louis Majorelle, Frank Lloyd Wright and others. The contemporary design holdings include works by Ettore Sottsass, Zaha Hadid, Richard Meier, the Campana brothers, and a newly formed collection of jewelry.

Since 2014 is Carl Otto Czeschka's solid silver "Wittgenstein-Vitrine" a new exquisite part of the DMA-collections (1908, Wiener Werkstätte).

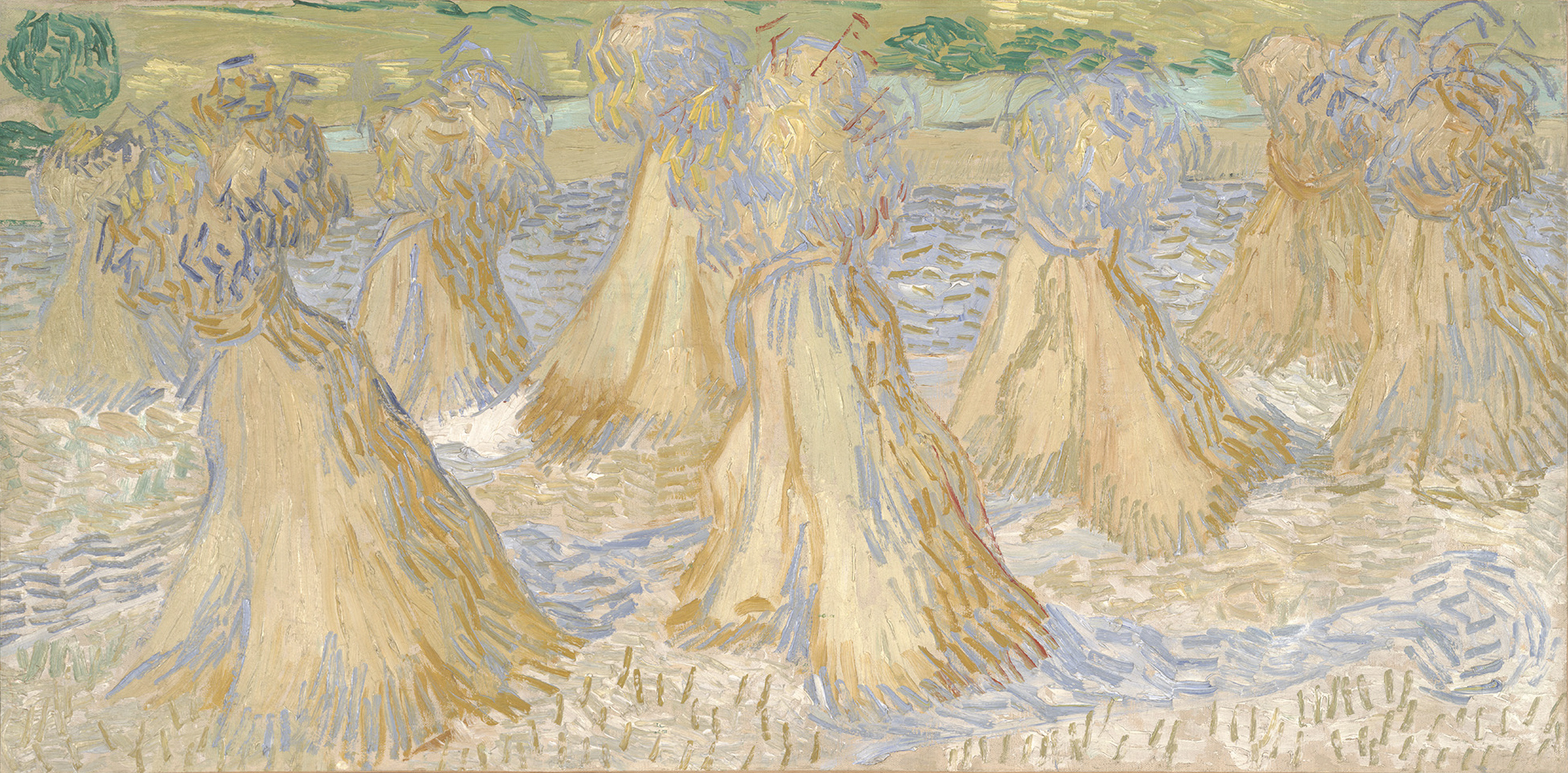
Vincent van Gogh, Sheaves of Wheat, 1890, Dallas Museum of Art

=== European ===
The Dallas Museum of Art's collection of European art starts in the 16th century. Some of the earlier works include paintings by Giulio Cesare Procaccini (Ecce Homo, 1615–18), Pietro Paolini (Bacchic Concert, 1630), and Nicolas Mignard (The Shepherd Faustulus Bringing Romulus and Remus to His Wife, 1654). Art of the 18th century is represented by artists like Canaletto (A View from the Fondamenta Nuova, 1772), Jean-Baptiste Marie Pierre (The Abduction of Europa, 1750), and Claude-Joseph Vernet (Mountain Landscape with Approaching Storm, 1775), Guillaume Lethière, ''Erminia and the Sheperds'', 1795.

The museum's 18th-century French collection currently houses the on loan collection of Michael L. Rosenberg collection French art of the19th and beginning of the 20th century is represented by Silence by sculptor Auguste Preault, Fox in the Snow by Gustave Courbet (1860), The Seine at Lavacourt by Claude Monet (1880), I Raro te Oviri by Paul Gauguin (1891), Interior (1902), Les Mtrroniers ou le Vitrail (1894) by Édouard Vuillard, and The Harbor (Le Port), 1912, by Jean Metzinger.

A growing collection of 19th and 20th century European paintings from Denmark, Fredericksborg by Moonlight Johan Christian Dahl, Belgium, Abundance by Léon Frédéric, Germany Italian Landscape by Hans Thoma, and Swiss The Halberdier by Ferdinand Hodler, offers a more comprehensive view of the art scene for this period. The sculpture collection from the first part of the 20th century includes important works such as Constructed Head n°2 by Naum Gabo, Three men Walking by Alberto Giacometti, 1936, White Relief by Ben Nicholson, and Beginning of the World by Constantin Brâncuși (1920). The collection of works by Piet Mondrian is noteworthy, with works like The Windmill (1908), Self-Portrait (1942), and Place de la Concorde (1938–43).

=== Pre-Columbian/Pacific Rim ===
The museum has significant holdings of ancient American art. The collection covers more than three millennia, displaying sculptures, prints, terracotta, and gold objects. Among the other highlights are gold objects from Panama, Colombia and Peru and the Head of the god Tlaloc (Mexico, 14th-16th century).

=== Wendy and Emery Reves Collection ===
The Wendy and Emery Reves Collection. In 1985 the Dallas Museum of Art received a gift from Wendy Reves in honor of her late husband, the publisher Emery Reves. The Reves collection is housed in an elaborate 15,000-square-foot (1,400 m^{2}) reproduction of the couple' home in France, the Villa La Pausa, where the works were originally displayed in situ. La Pausa was built by the fashion designer Coco Chanel in 1927, and some of the original furniture is kept in its context. Among the 1,400 paintings, sculptures, and works on paper Emery Reves had collected works from leading Impressionist, Post-Impressionist, and early Modernist artists, including Paul Cézanne, Honoré Daumier, Edgar Degas, Paul Gauguin, Édouard Manet, Claude Monet, Camille Pissarro, Auguste Renoir, Henri de Toulouse-Lautrec, and Vincent van Gogh. A collection of Auguste Rodin sculptures includes bronze casts, an unusual original wax piece.the rare marble of Sirens, The poet and contemplative life from the Fenaille family, a unique piece. An extensive accompanying collection of decorative arts works includes Chinese export porcelain; European furniture; Oriental and European carpets; iron, bronze, and silver work; European glass; and rare books. Memorabilia of the Reves' friendship with English statesman Winston Churchill, a frequent guest at La Pausa, is housed in the wing as well.

== Exhibitions ==
Contemporary Art + Design featured many works from a variety of media including, drawing painting, installations, jewelry, and design objects. The Exhibition, with works and experimental sculptures from over 11 countries was available from August 30, 2020, to March 7, 2021.

Cindy Sherman's Exhibition took place from March 7, 2013, to June 9, 2013. The retrospective, from her undergrad to photographic murals. traced Sherman's career from the mid 70s to the time of the exhibition. She continues to be widely recognized as an important contemporary artist.

Dior: From Paris to the World began May 19, 2019, and ended on October 27, 2019. Christian Dior was showcased in the exhibition along with his successors including Yves Saint Laurent, Marc Bohan, Gianfranco Ferré, John Galliano, Raf Simons, and Maria Grazia Chiuri. The exhibition consisted of 200 haute couture dresses, accessories, photographs, sketches, and runway videos.

== Community events ==
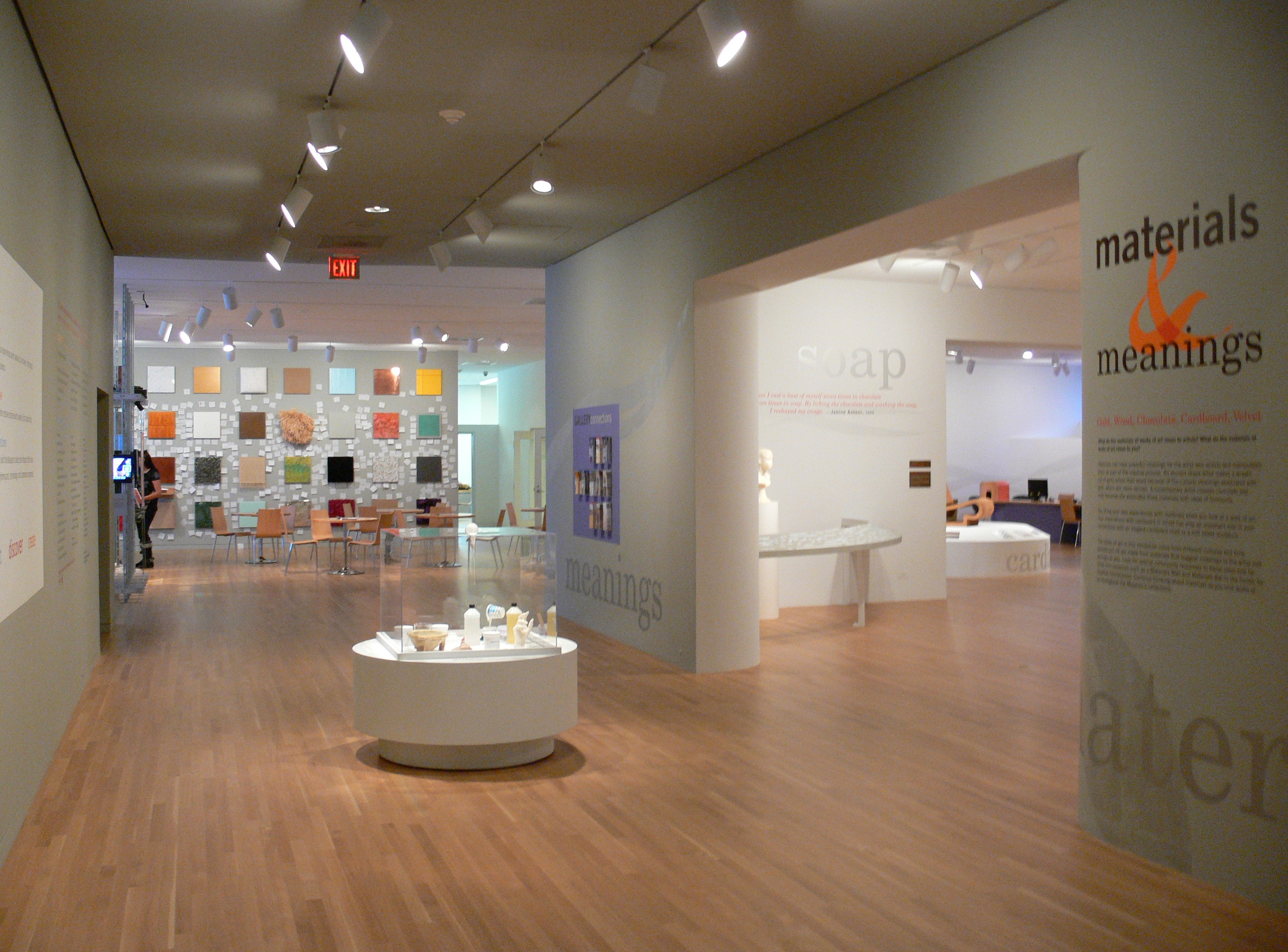
The Center for Creative Connections

In 2008, the museum premiered the Center for Creative Connections (also known as C3), a 12,000-square-foot (1,100 m^{2}) facility for interactive learning experiences. The center presents exhibitions featuring the museum's collections and artists’ and community partners’ responses to them. Spaces include the Art Studio, Tech Lab, Theater, and Arturo's Nest.

The museum also hosts numerous community outreach programs throughout the year, including:

- Late Nights: once a month the museum is open until midnight with performances, concerts, readings, film screenings, tours and family programs.
- Arts & Letters Live: a lecture series featuring acclaimed authors, actors, illustrators, and musicians.
- Thursday Night Live: every Thursday evening there are live jazz concerts, dinner and drinks in the cafe, and artist encounters in the Center for Creative Connections.

== Management ==
In 2013, the Dallas Museum of Art instituted free admission and a free membership program.

In September 2015, Maxwell Anderson stepped down as director, and was succeeded by Walter Elcock, president of the DMA's board.

== Looted art controversies ==
In 2021, the museum returned a 10th century statue to Nepal where it was reinstalled in the temple from which it had been looted.

The museum lists 196 artworks on the Nazi Era Provenance Internet Portal.

== Collection highlights: paintings and sculpture ==
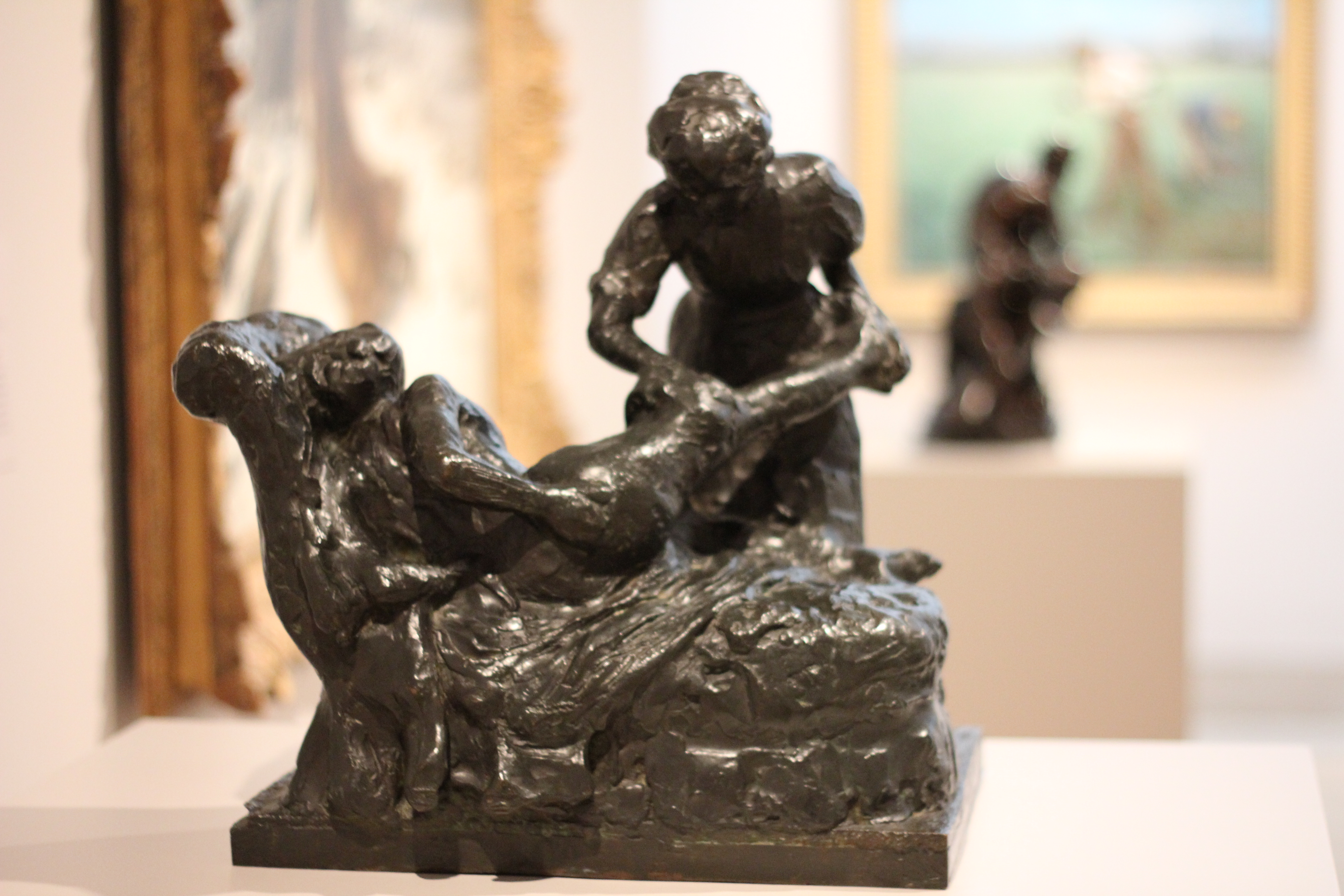
Edgar Degas, The Masseuse, (between 1896 and 1911)

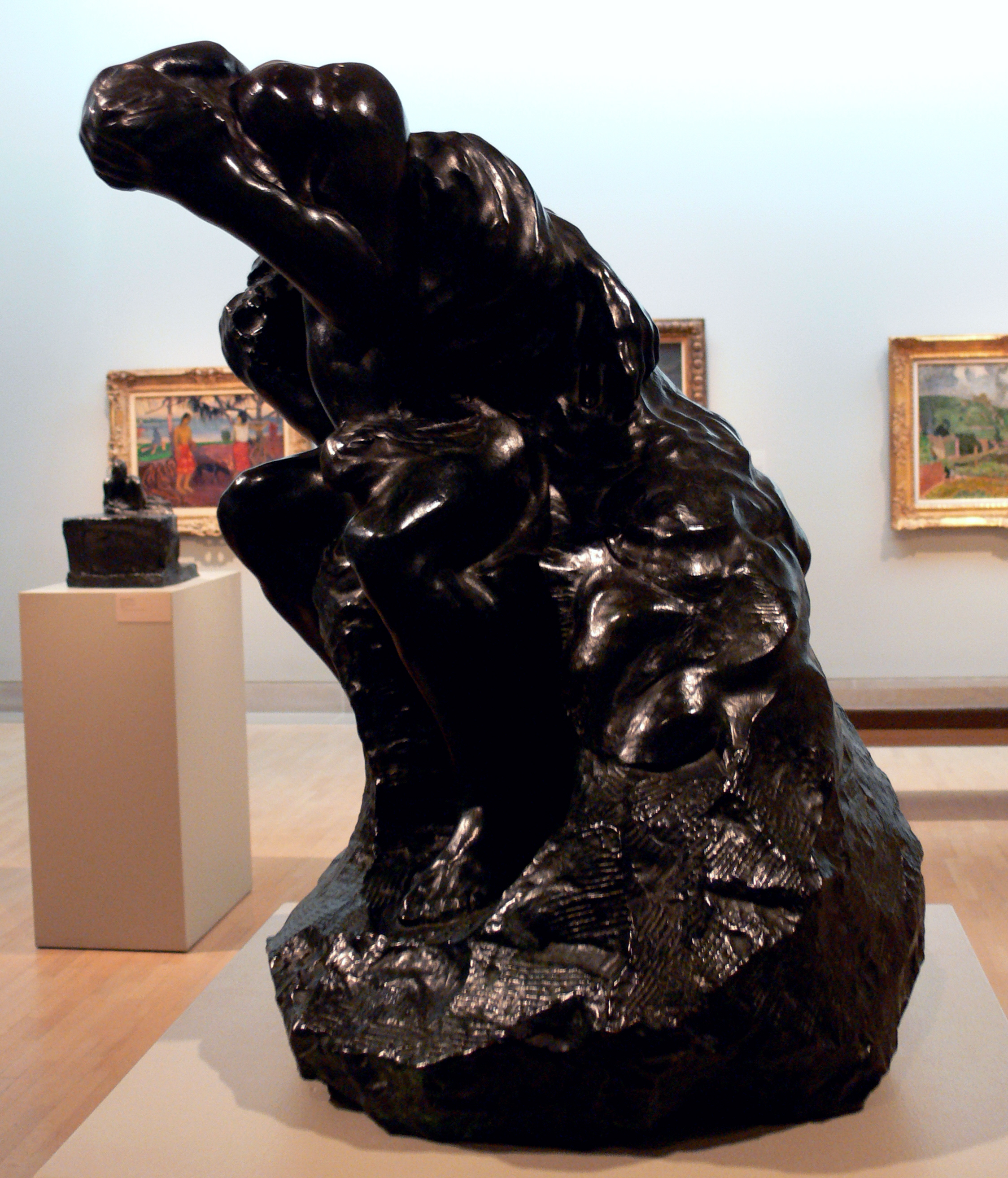
Auguste Rodin, Sculptor and his Muse, 1893
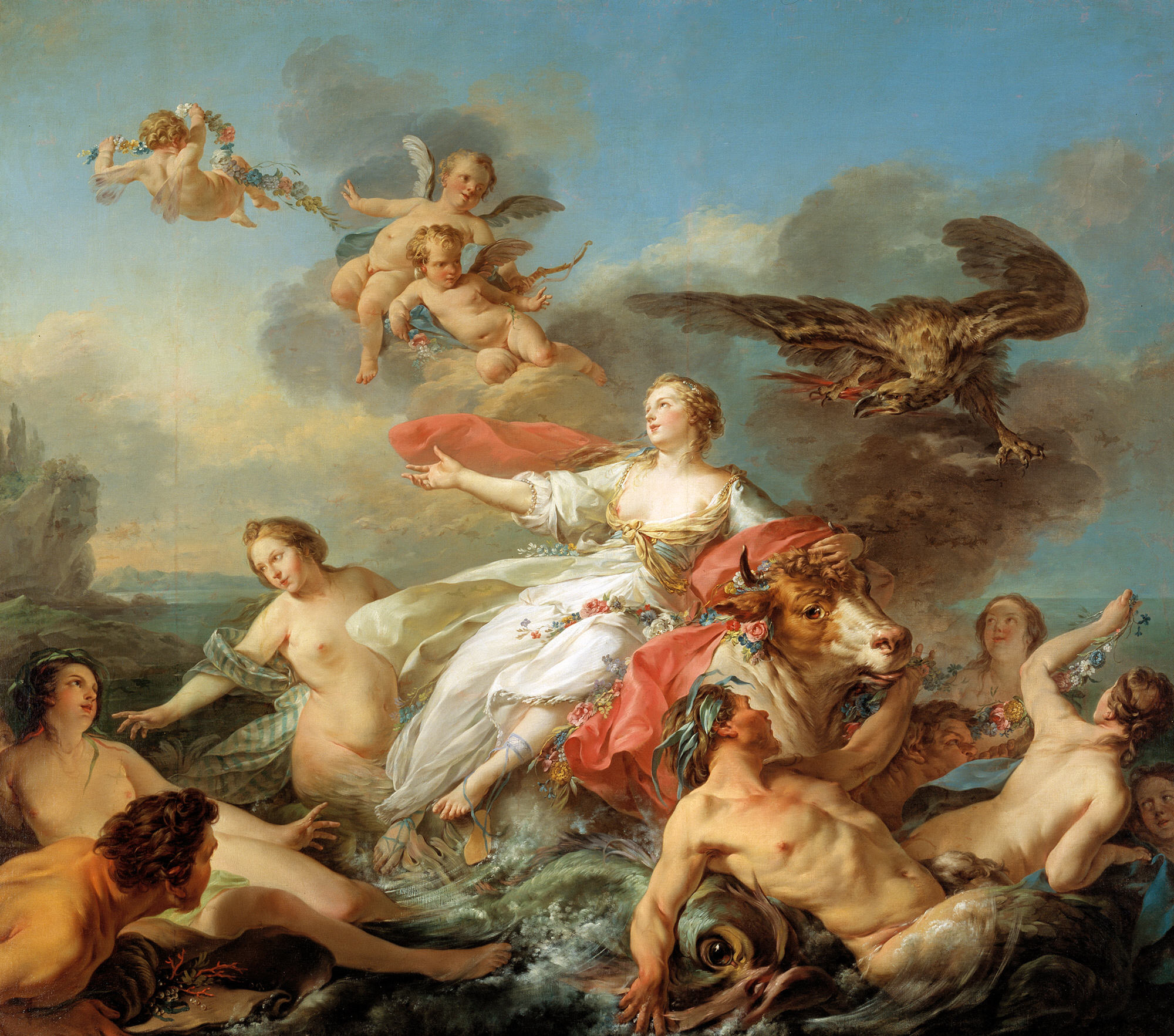
Jean-Baptiste Marie Pierre, The Abduction of Europa, 1750

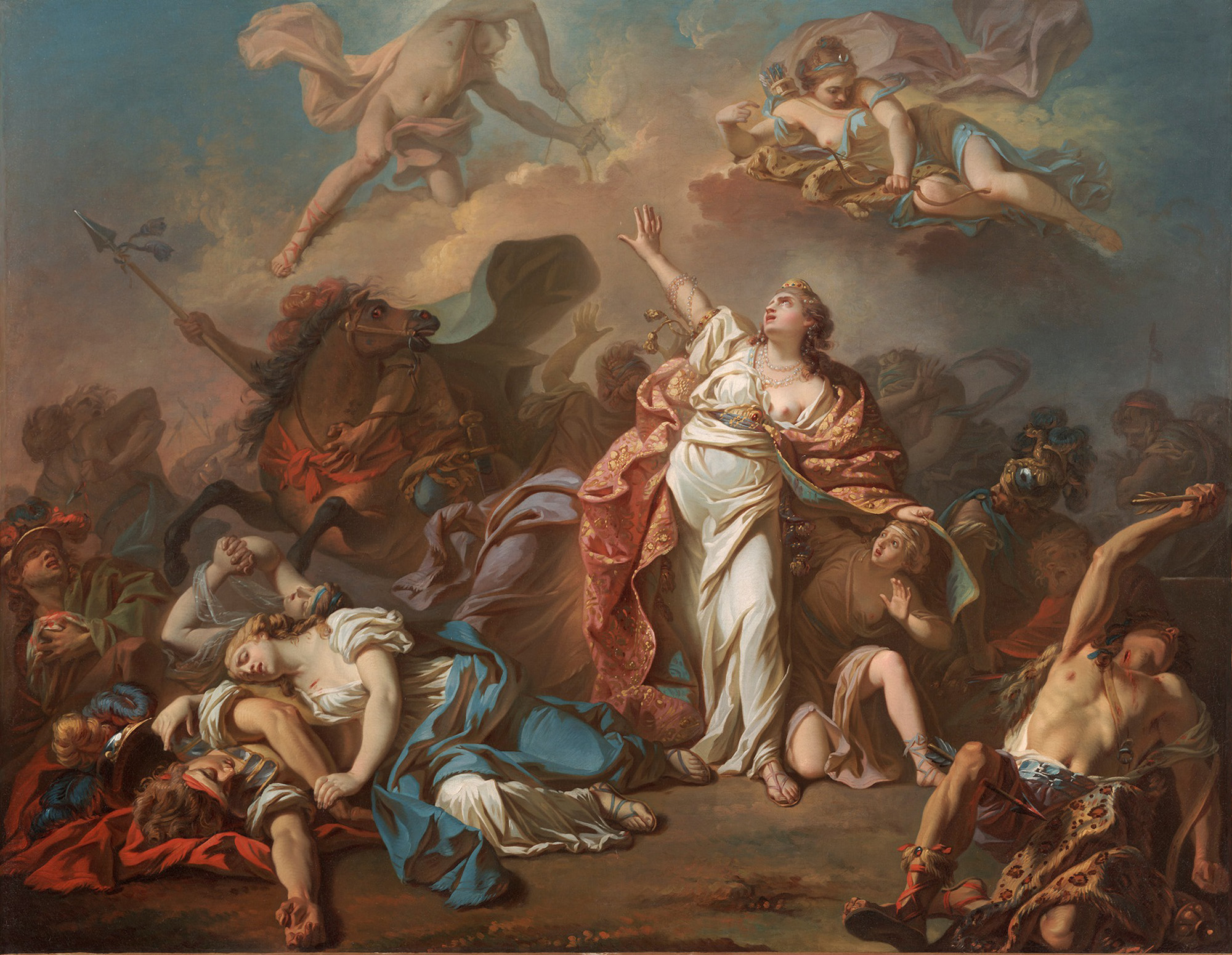
Jacques-Louis David, Apollo and Artemis attacking the twelve children of Niobe, 1772

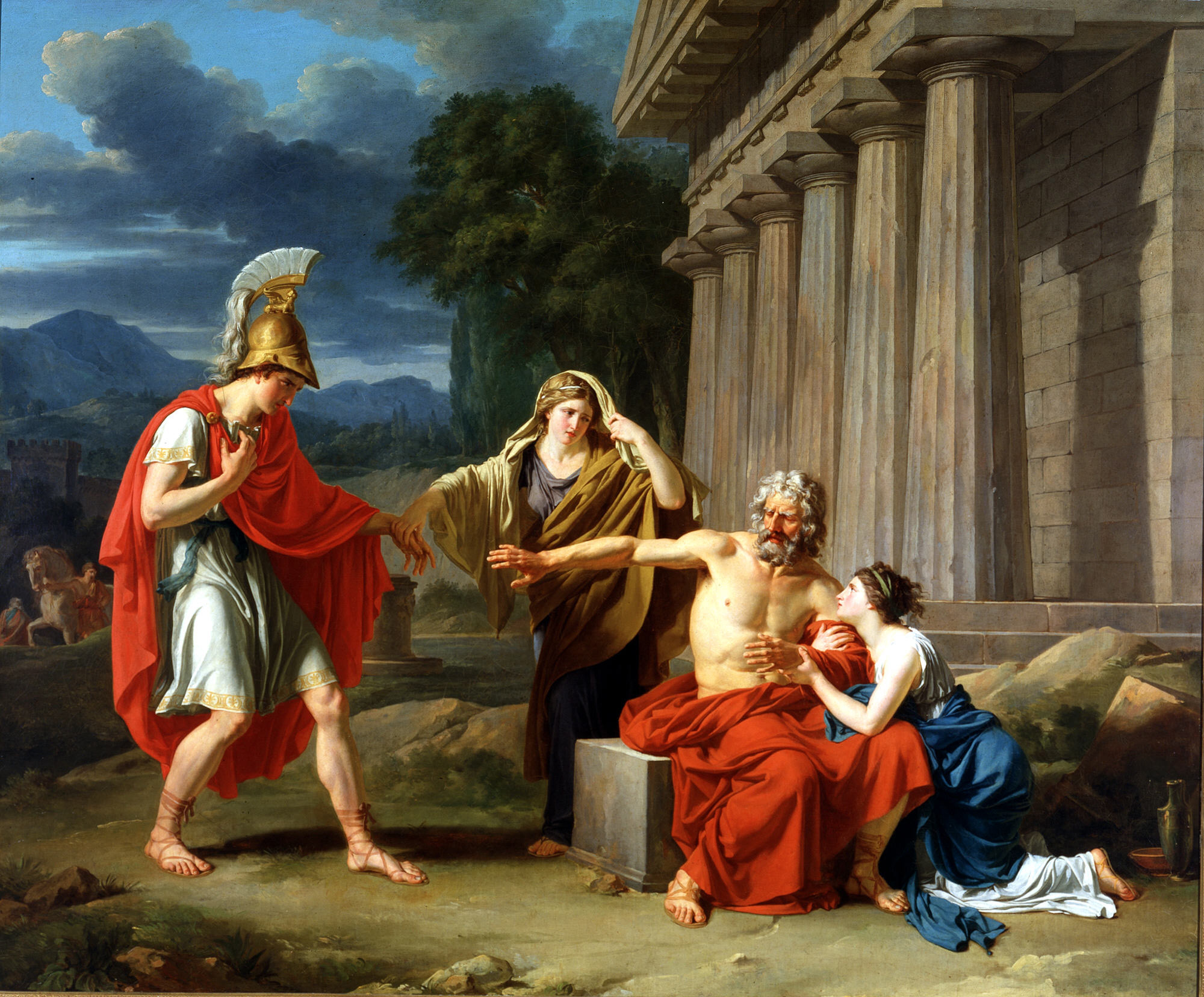
Jean-Antoine-Théodore Giroust, Oedipus at Colonus, 1788

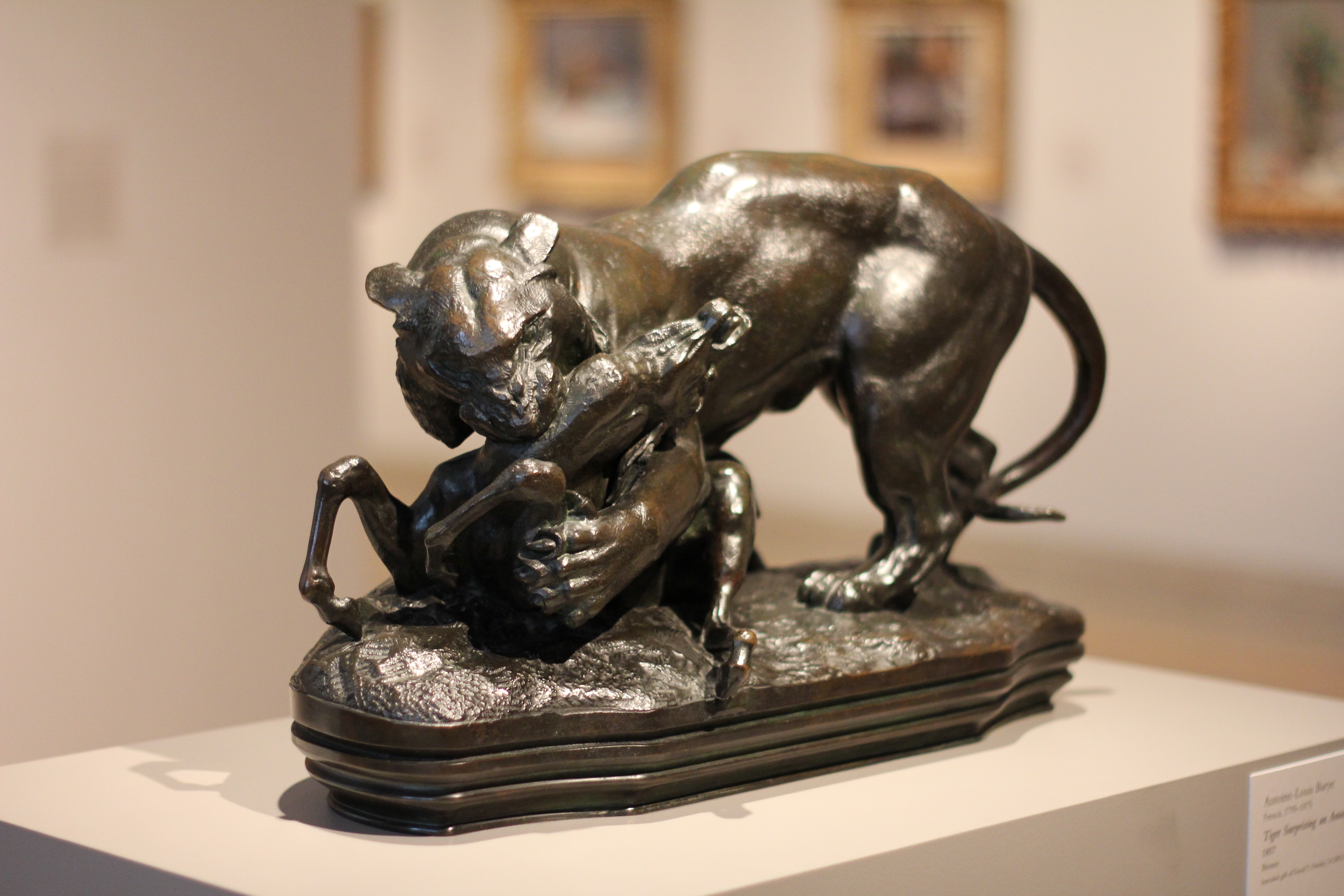
Antoine-Louis Barye, Tiger Surprising an Antelope, 1857

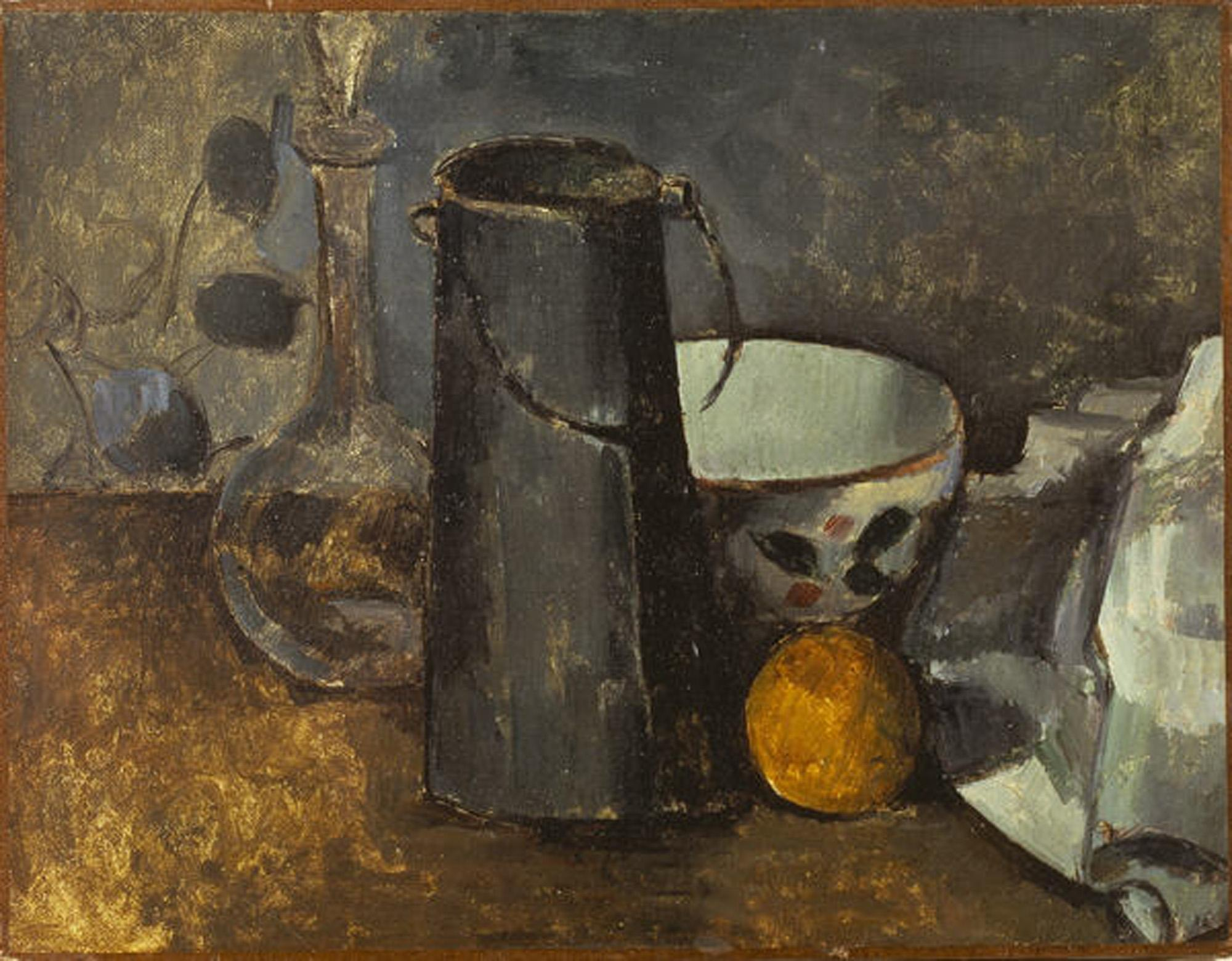
Paul Cézanne, Still Life with Carafe, Milk Can, Bowl, and Orange, 1879–80

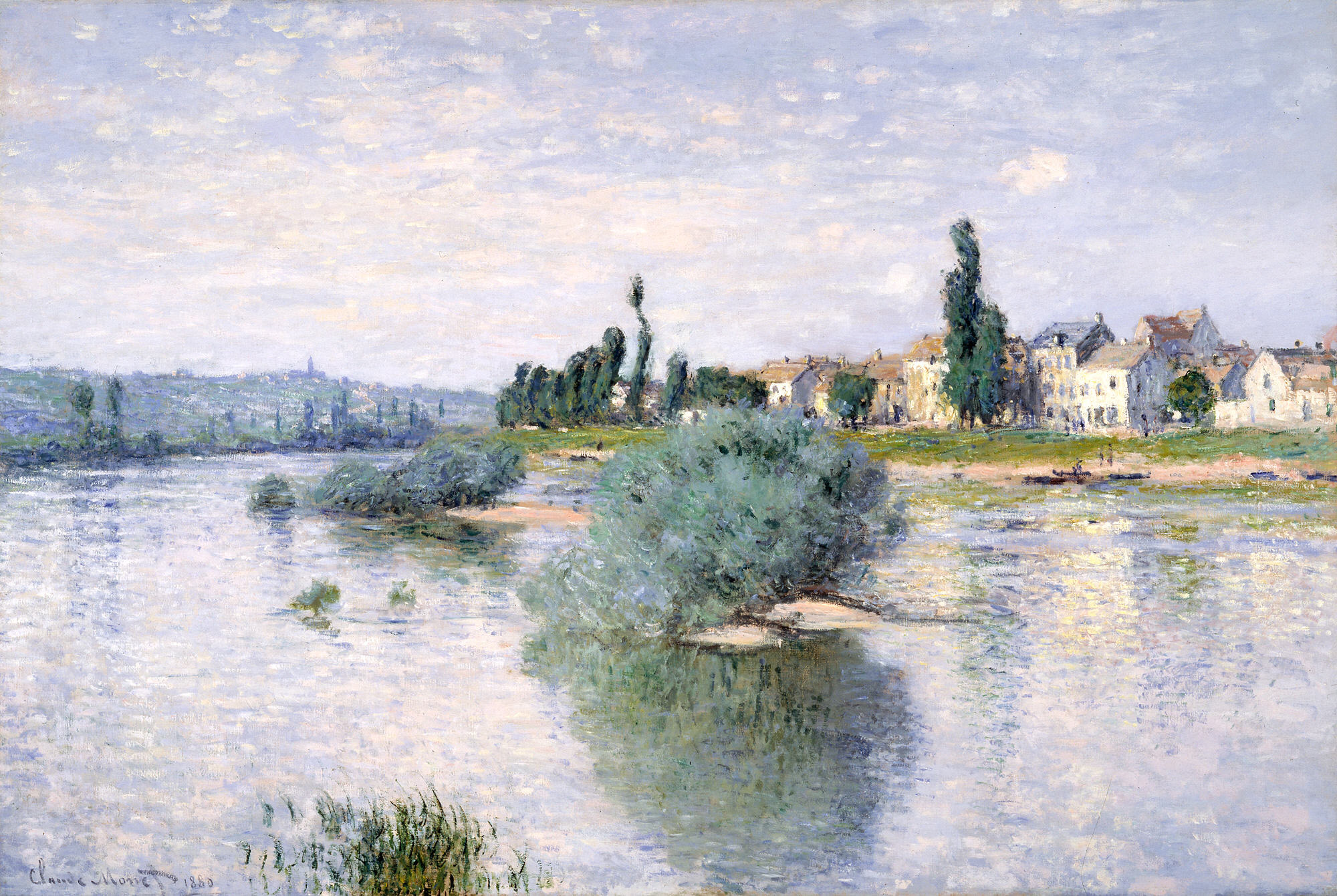
Claude Monet, The Seine at Lavacourt, 1880

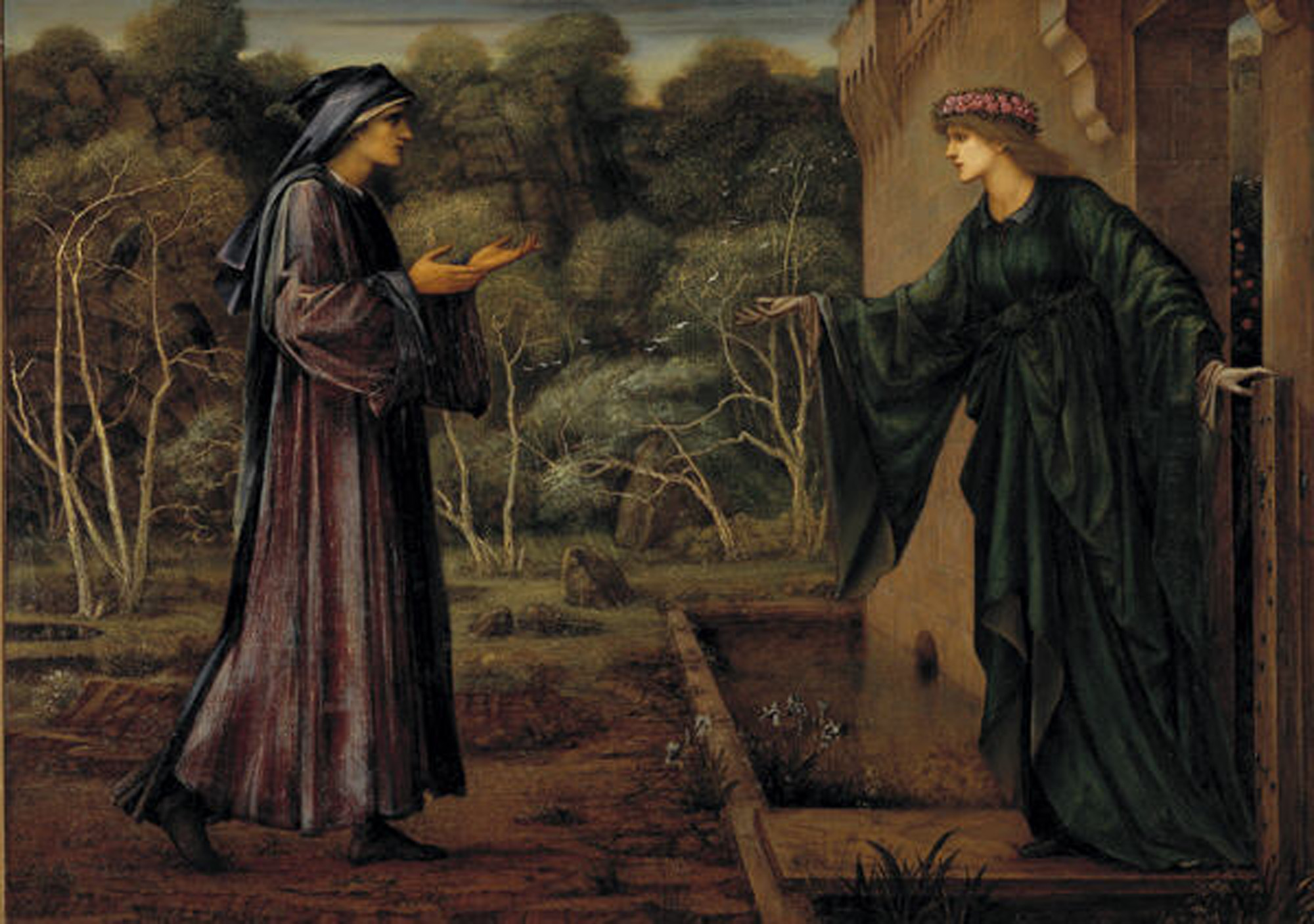
Edward Burne-Jones, The Pilgrim at the Gate of Idleness, 1884

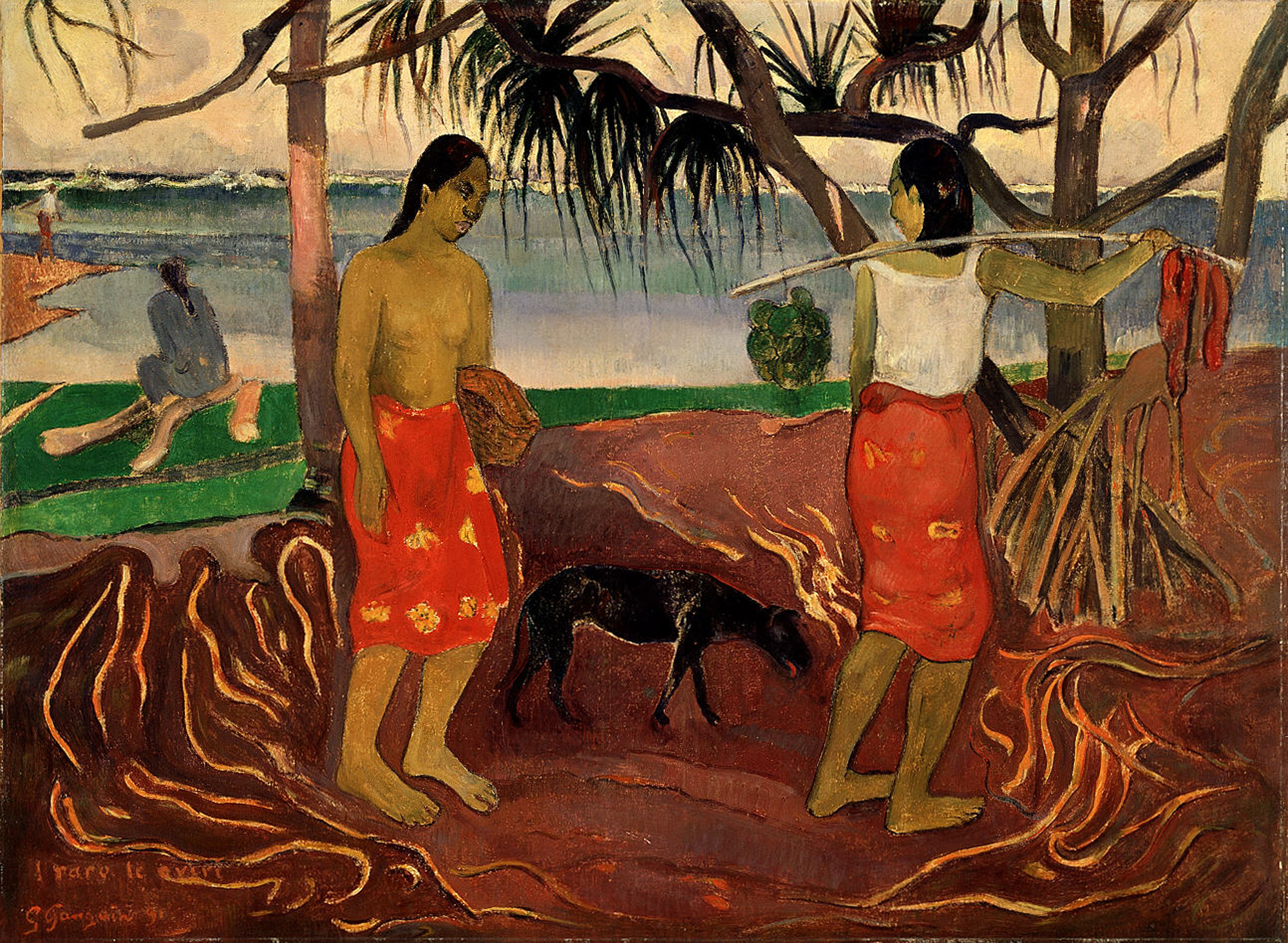
Paul Gauguin, I Raro te Oviri, 1891

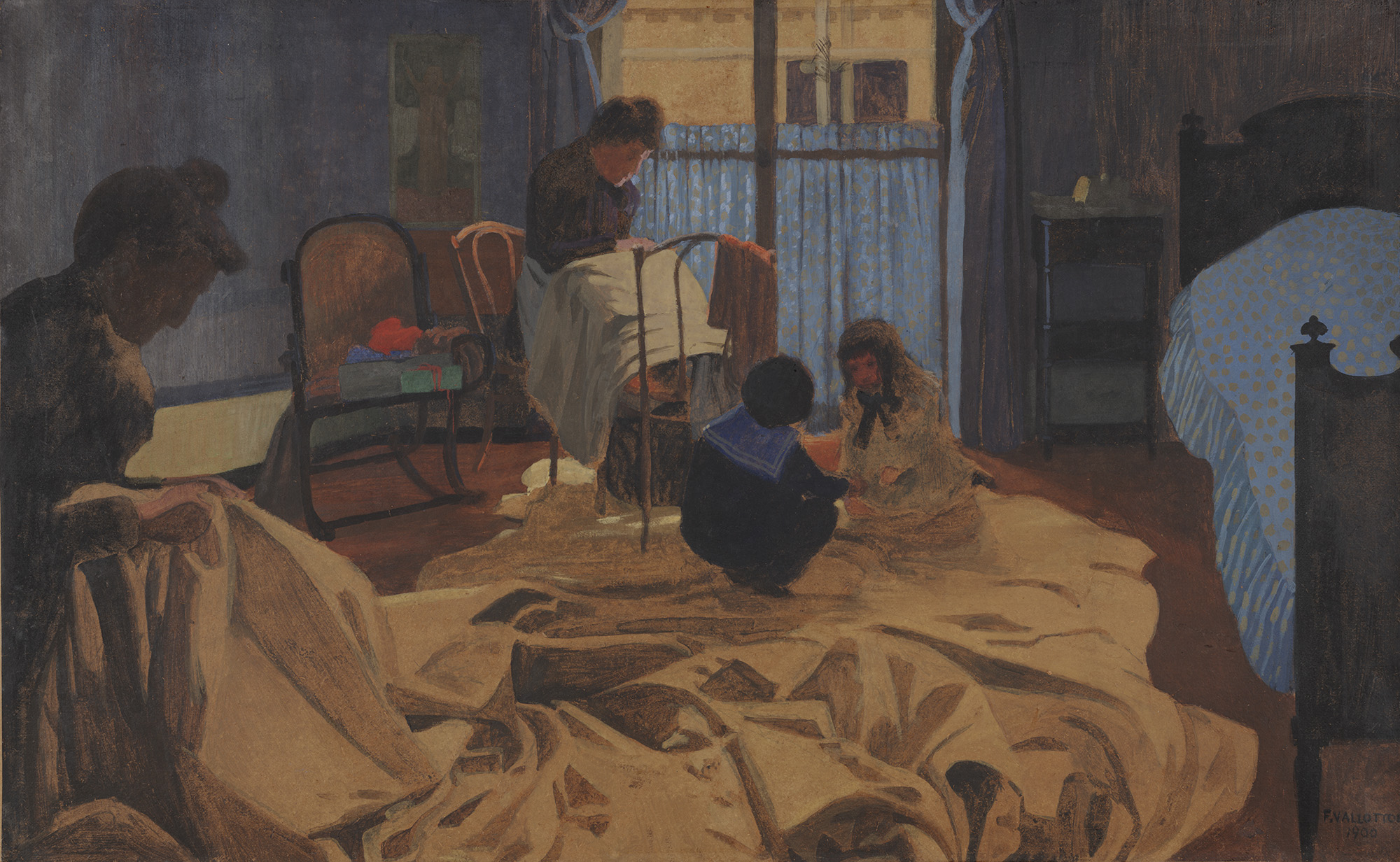
Félix Vallotton, The Laundress, Blue Room, 1900

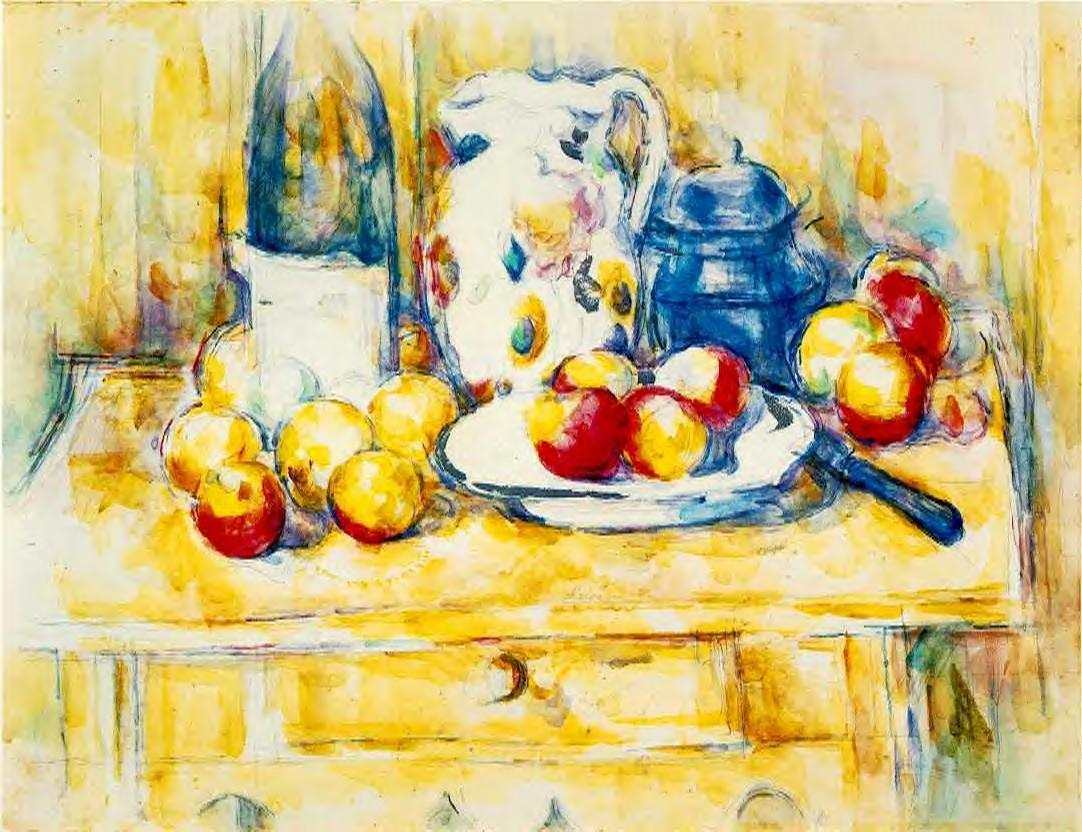
Paul Cézanne, Still Life with Apples, a Bottle and a Milk Pot, 1900–06

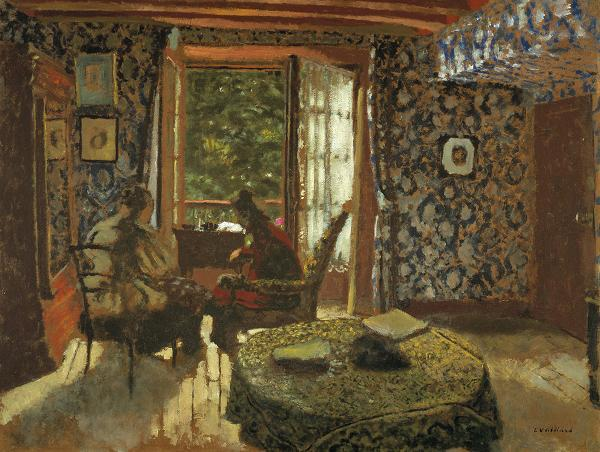
Édouard Vuillard, Interior, 1902

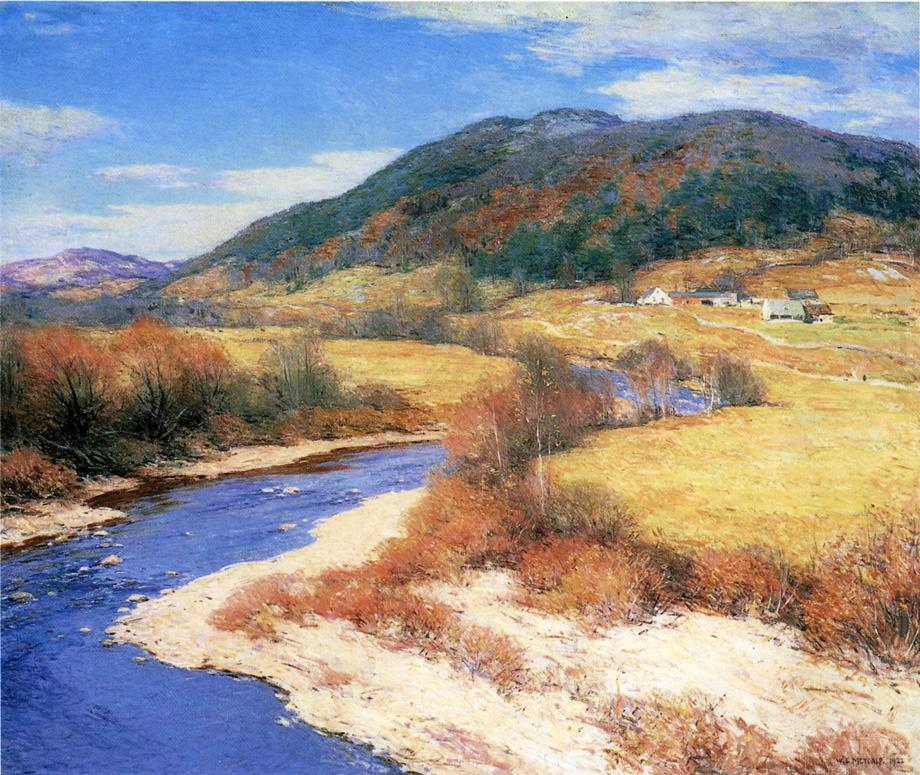
Willard Metcalf, Indian Summer, Vermont, 1922
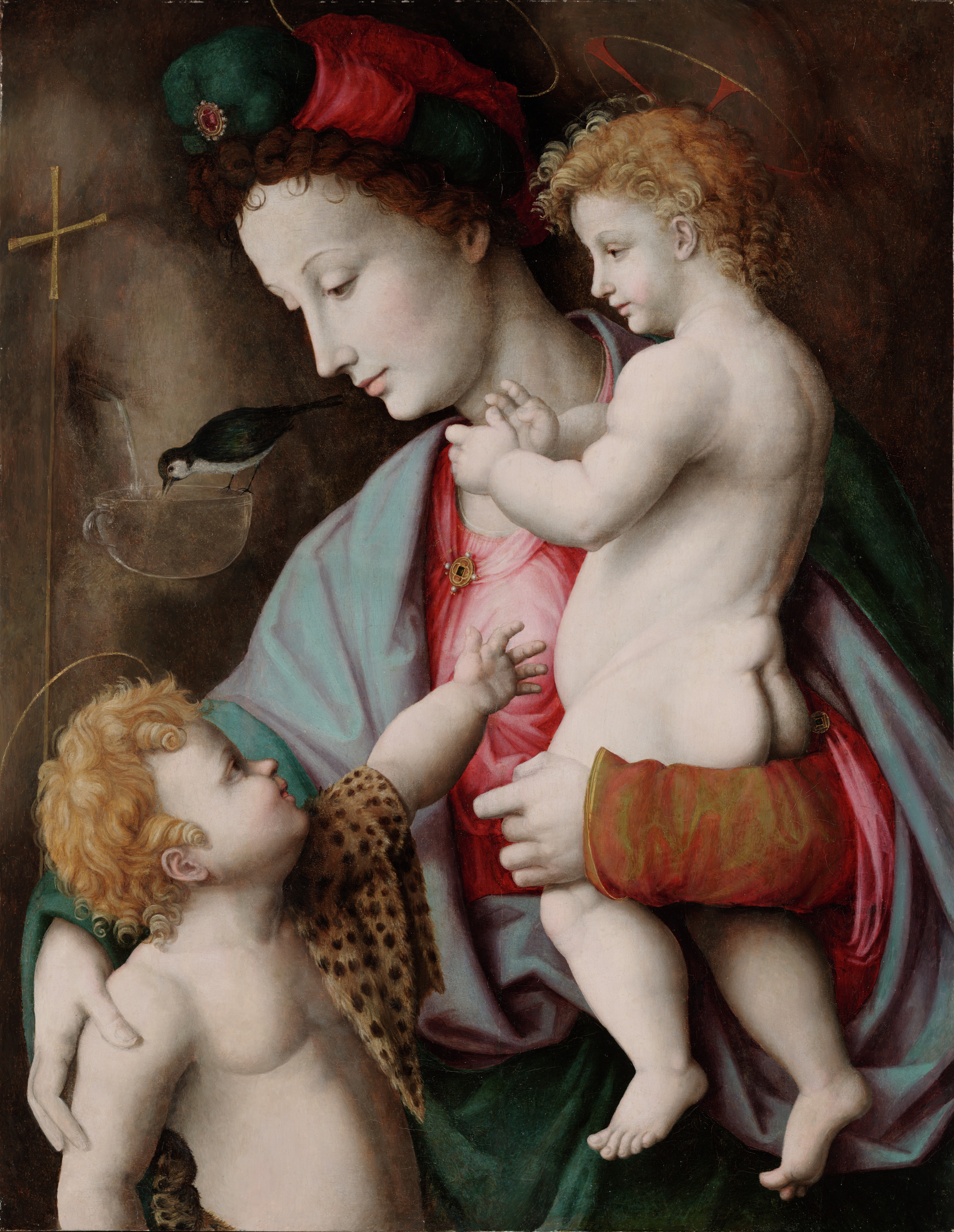
Francesco Bacchiacca, Madonna and Child with St John, 1525

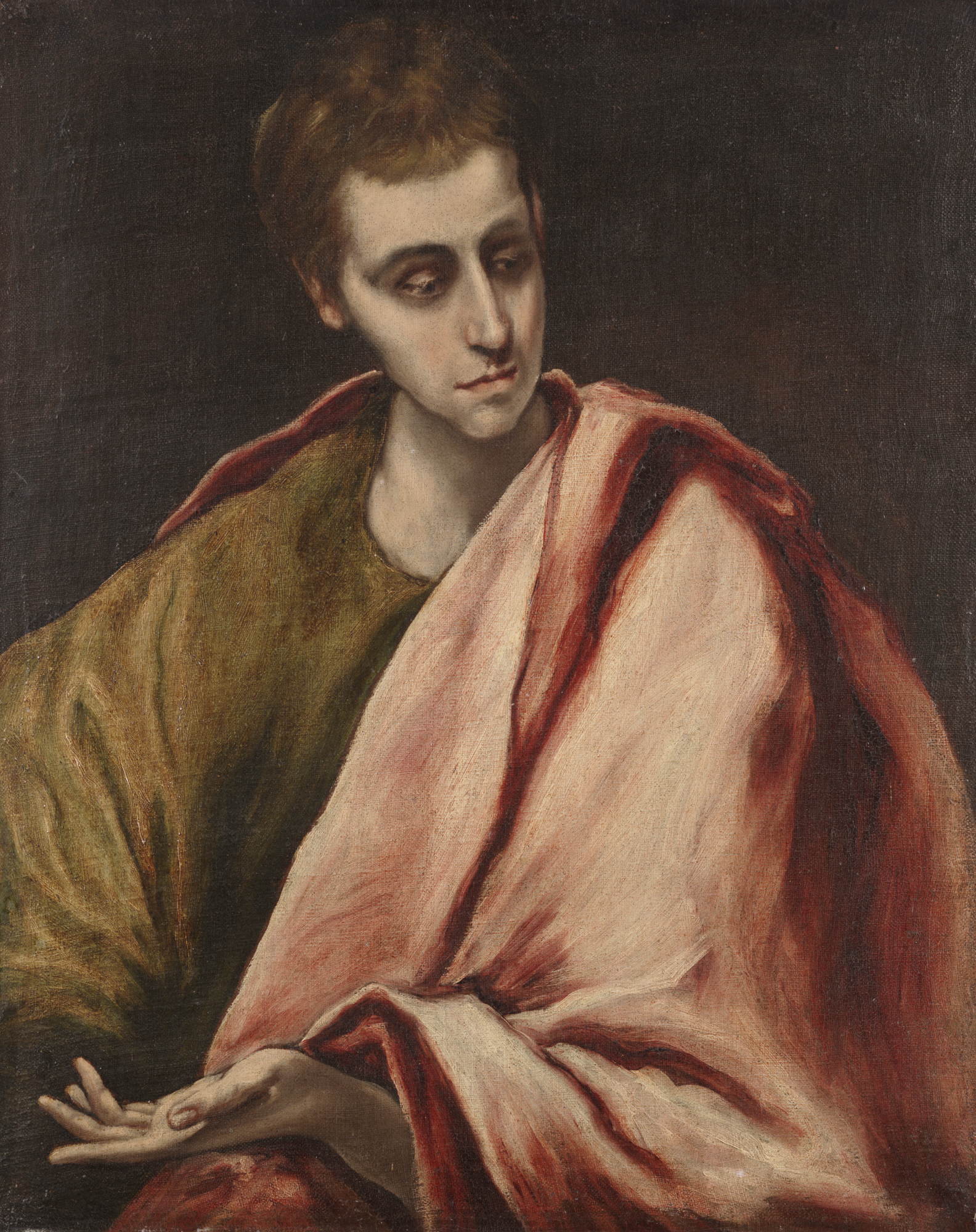
El Greco, St. John, 1590-1595

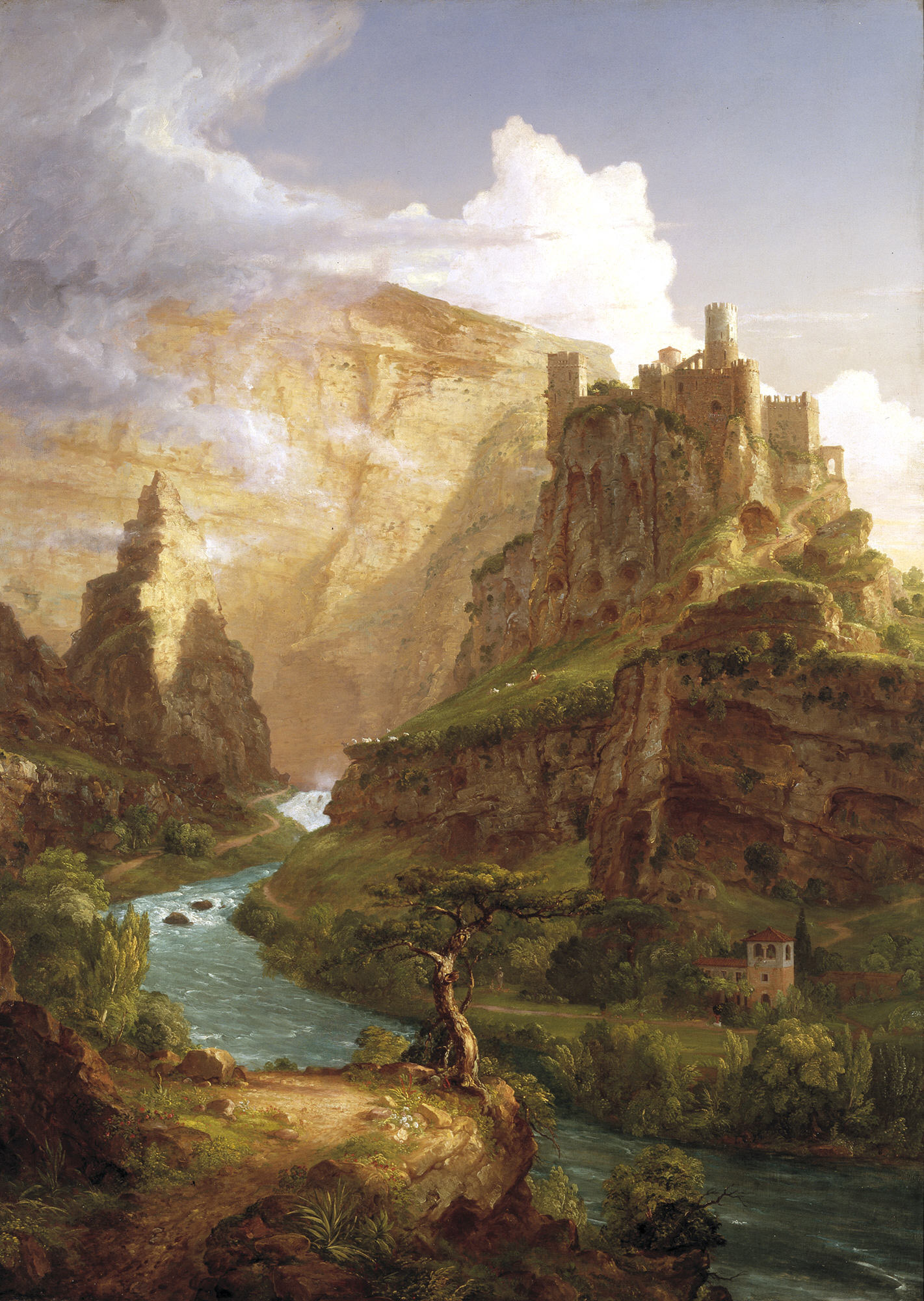
Thomas Cole, The Fountain of Vaucluse, 1841

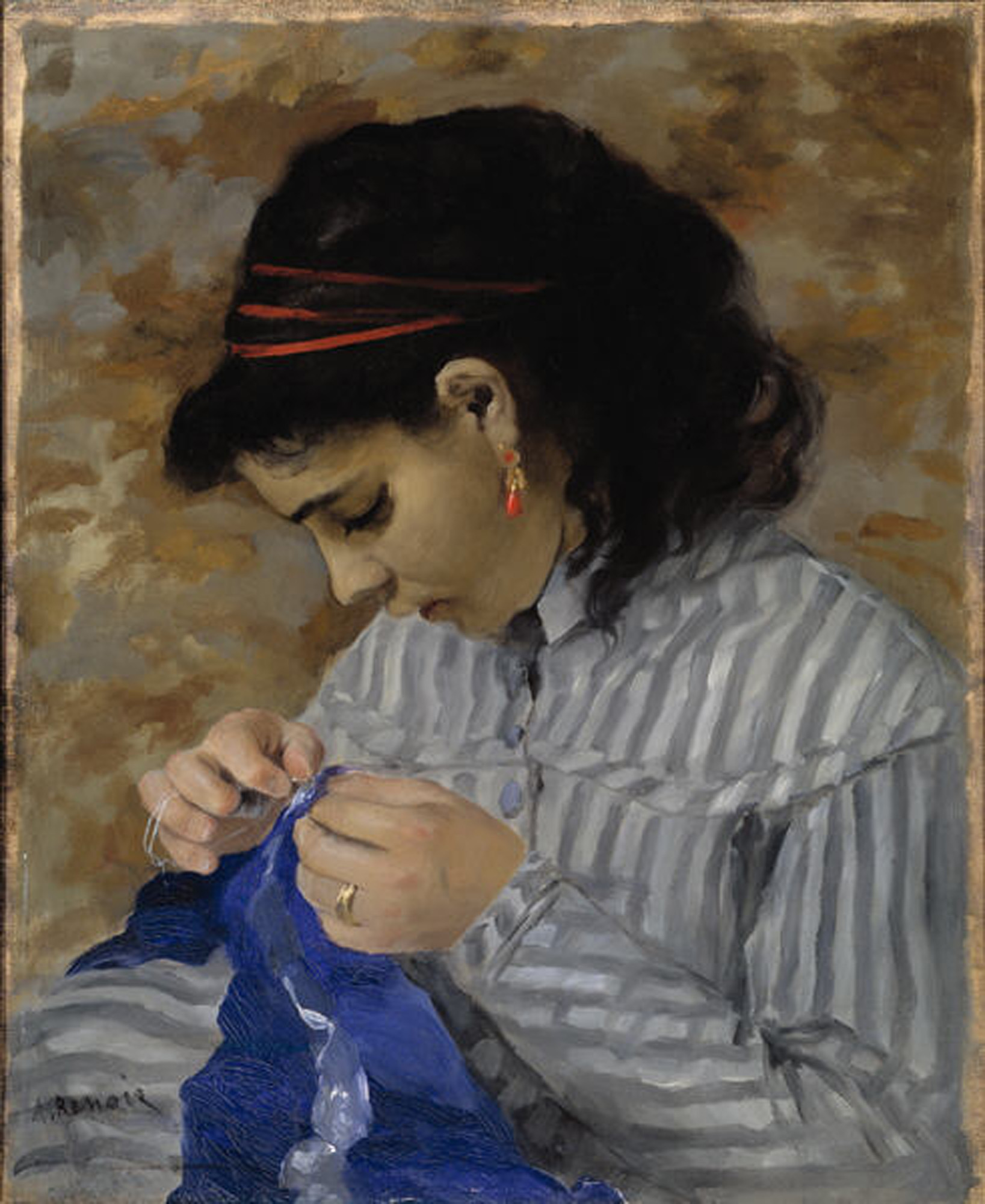
Pierre-Auguste Renoir, Lise Sewing, 1866

Édouard Manet, Isabelle Lemonnier with a Muff, 1879

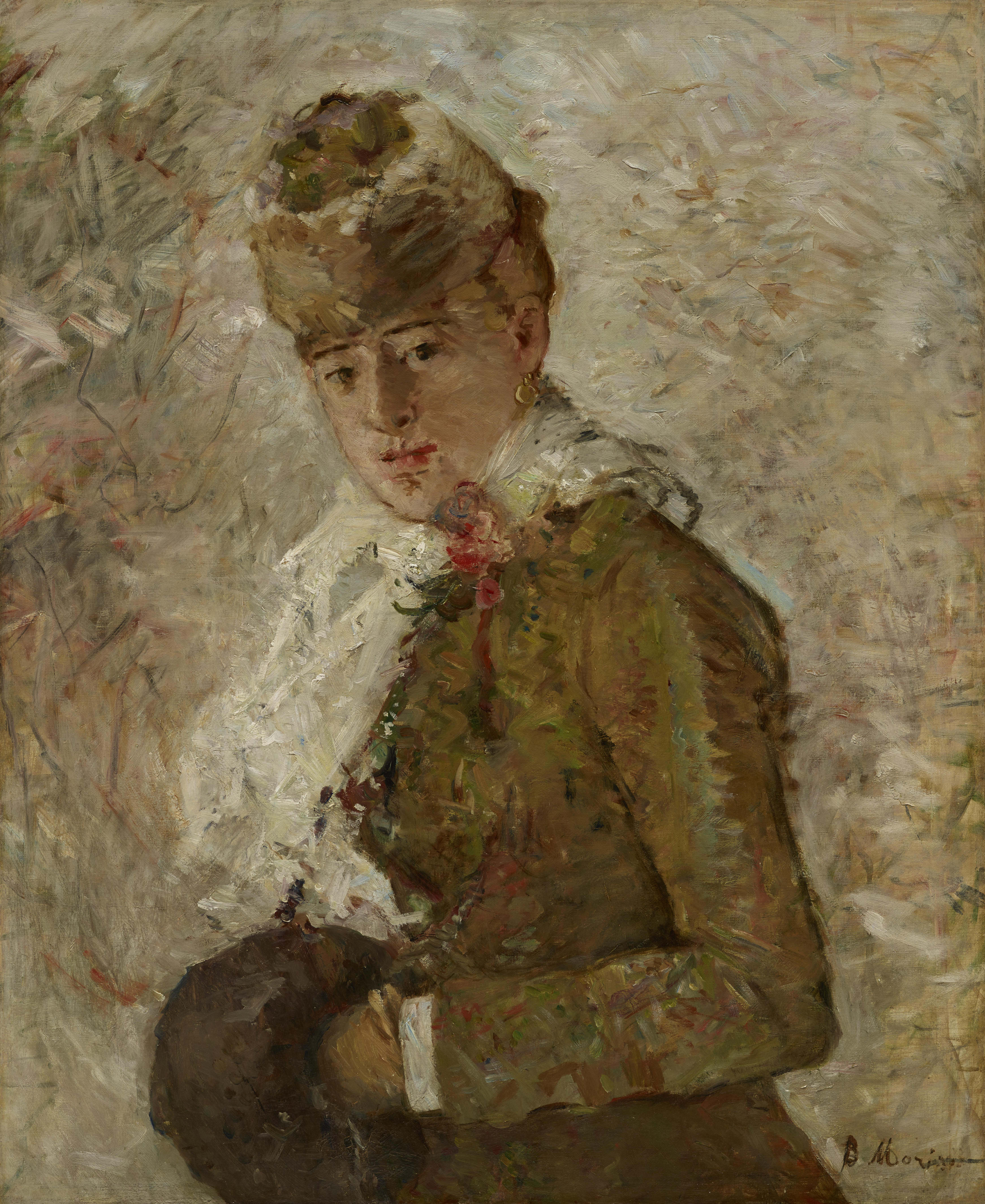
Berthe Morisot, Winter (Woman with a Muff), 1880

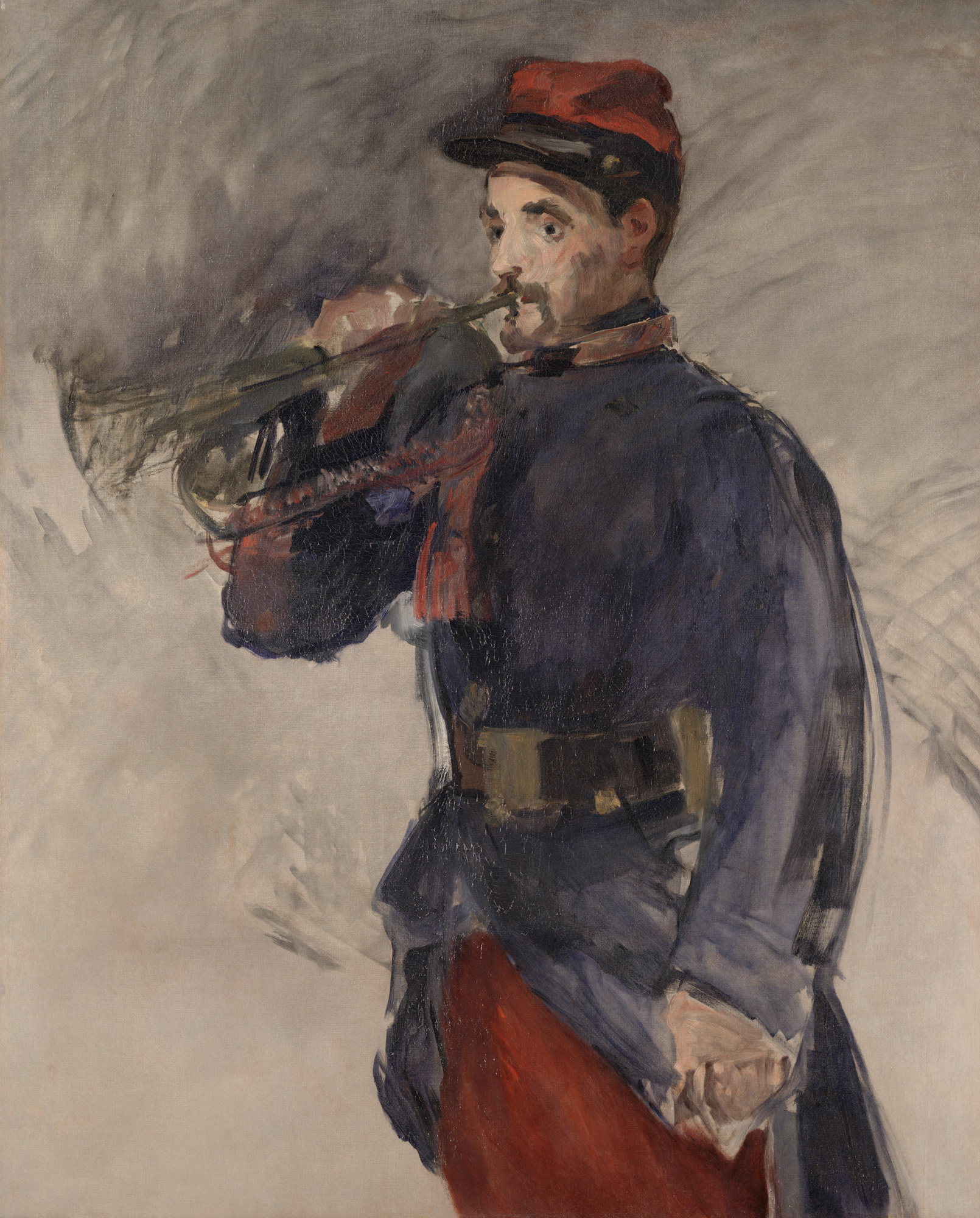
Édouard Manet, The Bugler, 1882

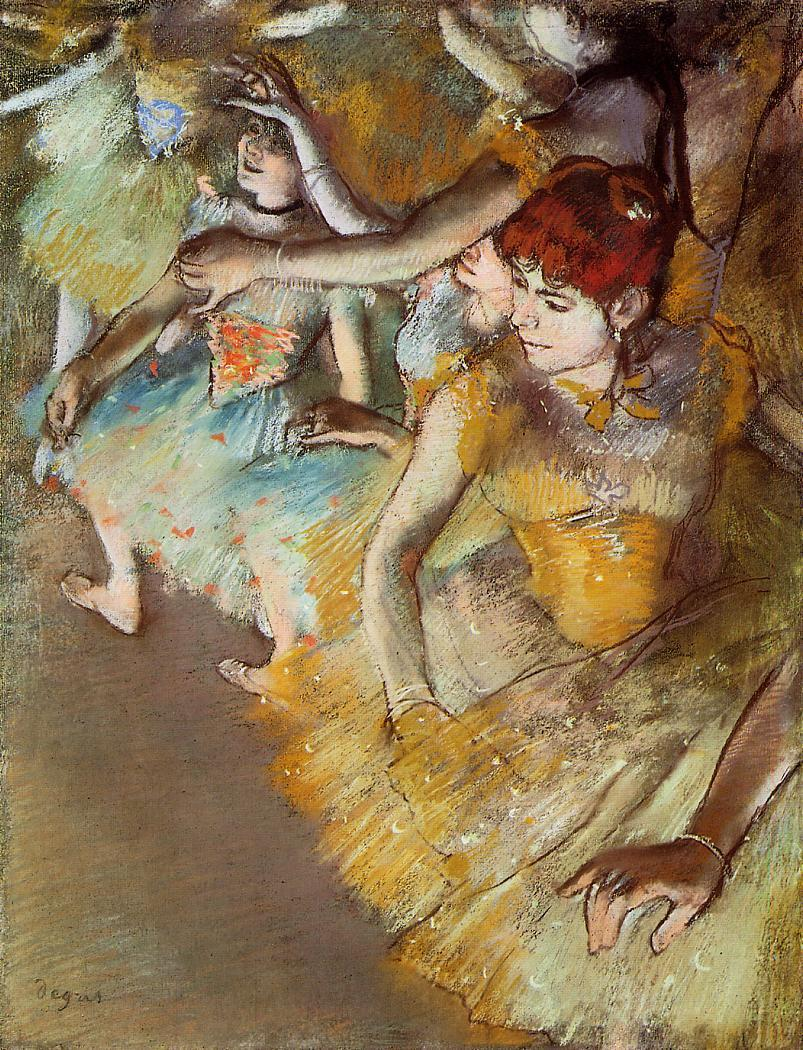
Edgar Degas, Ballet Dancers on the Stage, 1883

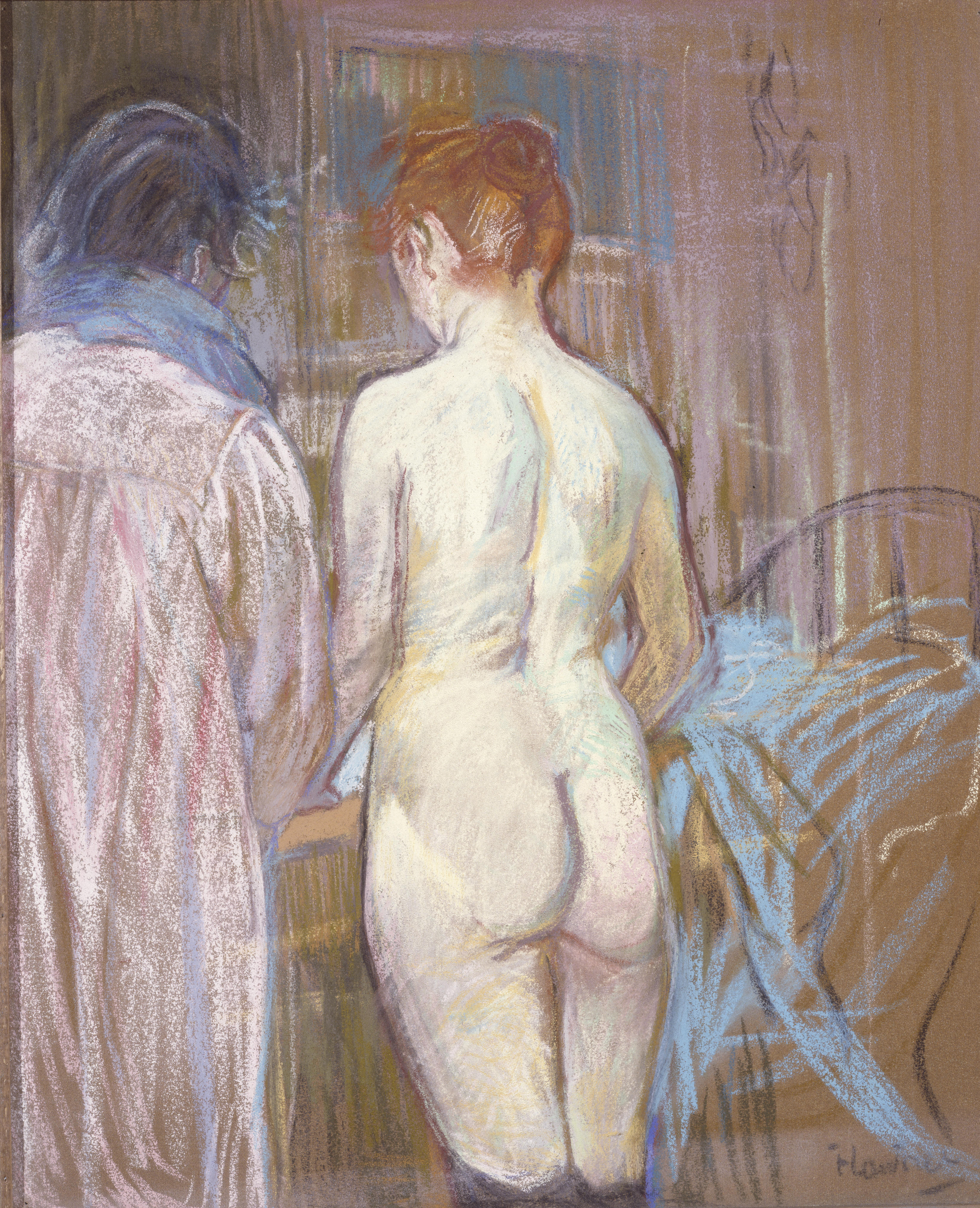
Henri de Toulouse-Lautrec, Prostitutes, 1893-1895

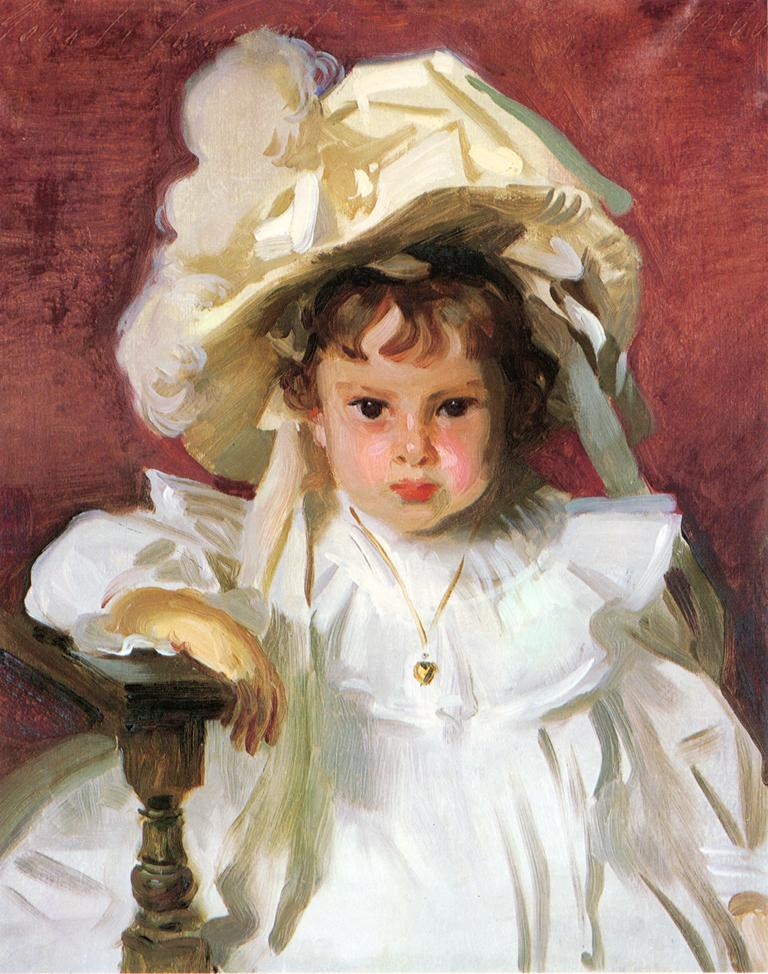
John Singer Sargent, Dorothy, 1900

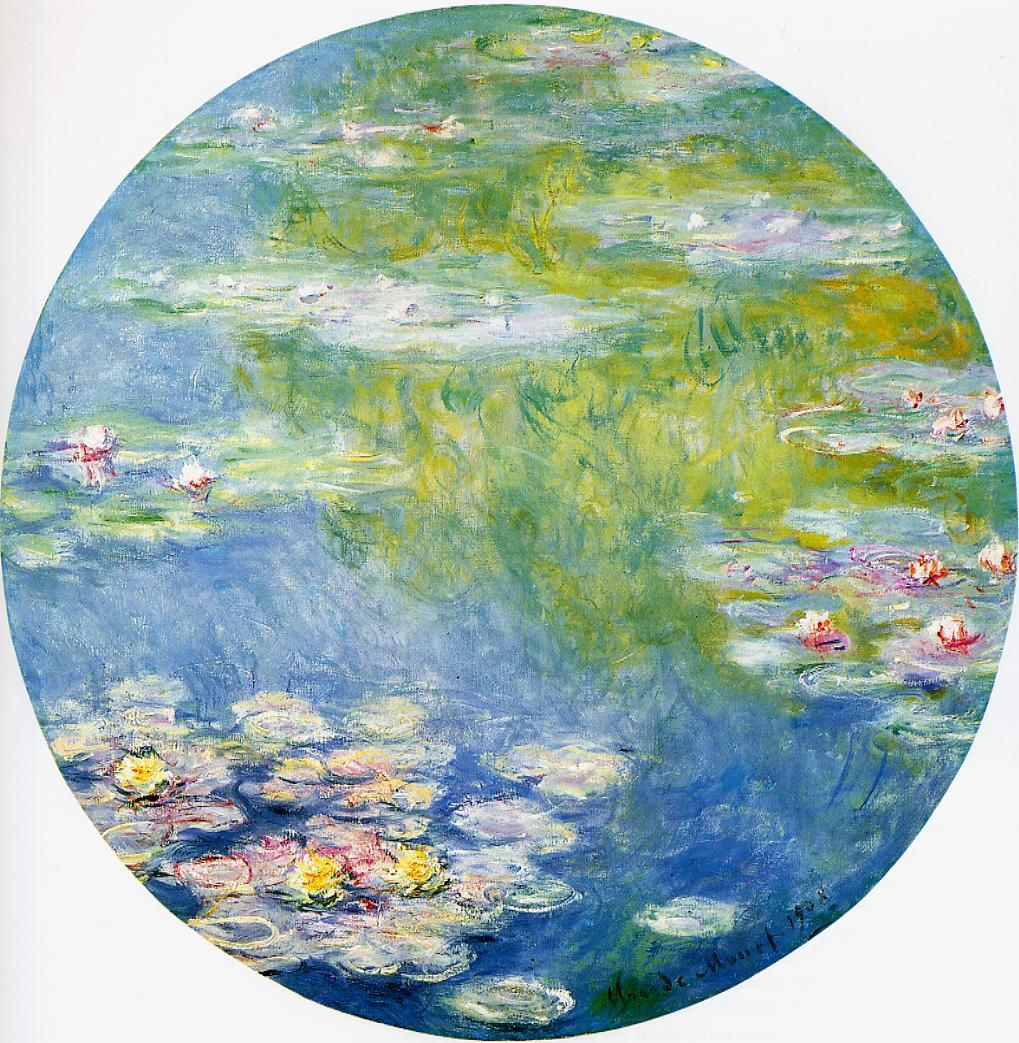
Claude Monet, Water Lilies, 1908

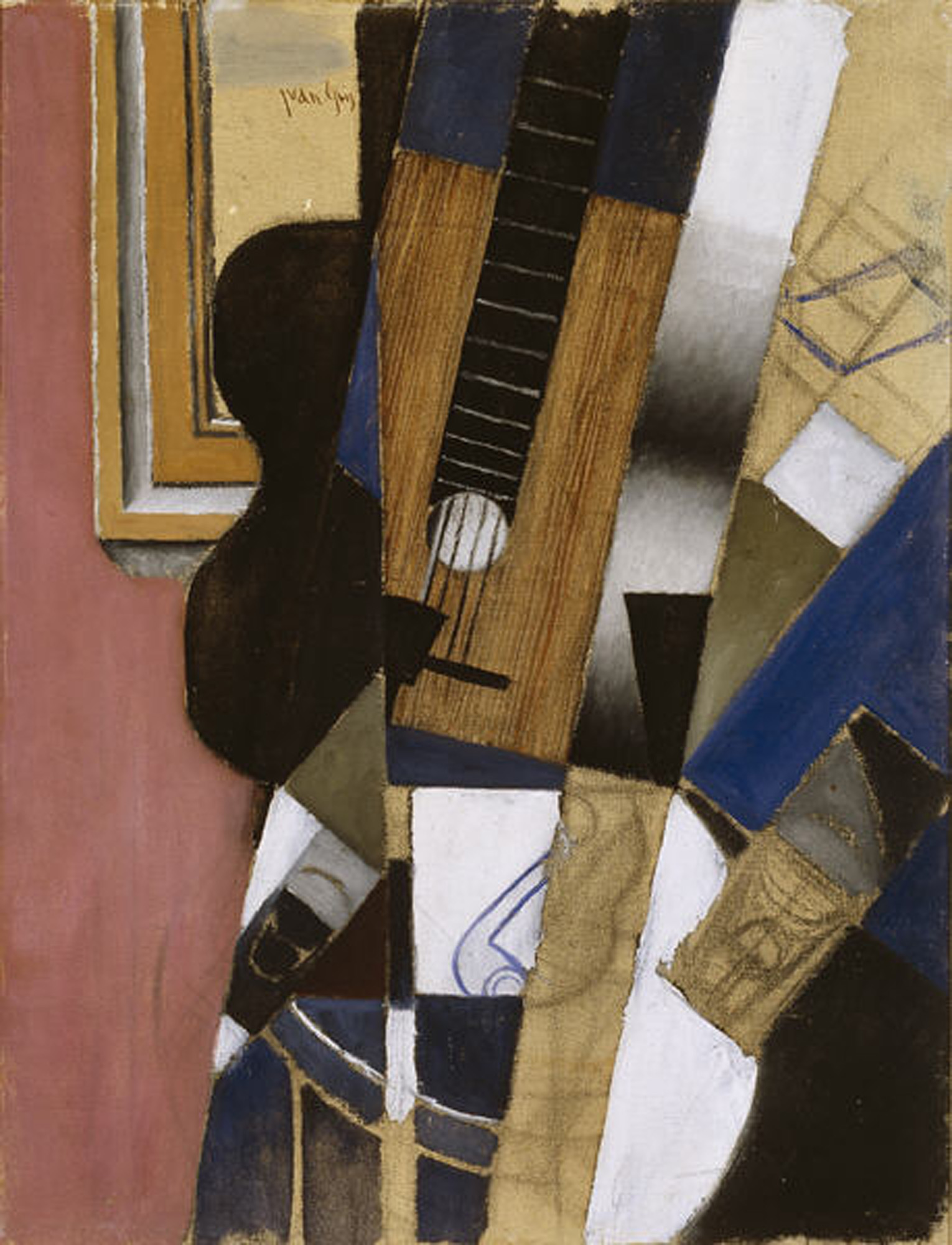
Juan Gris, Guitar and Pipe, 1913

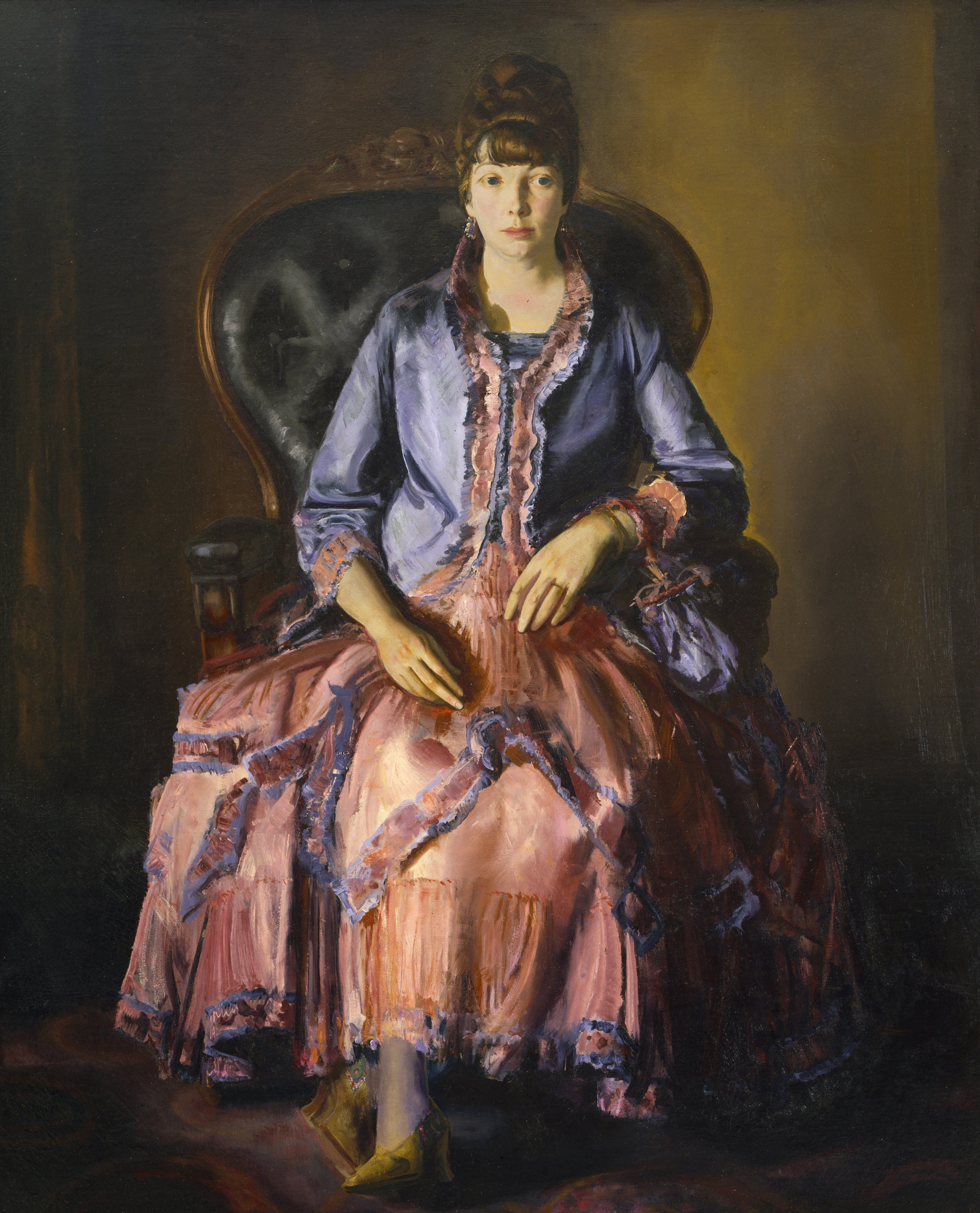
George Bellows, Emma in a Purple Dress, 1920–23

== More collection highlights ==
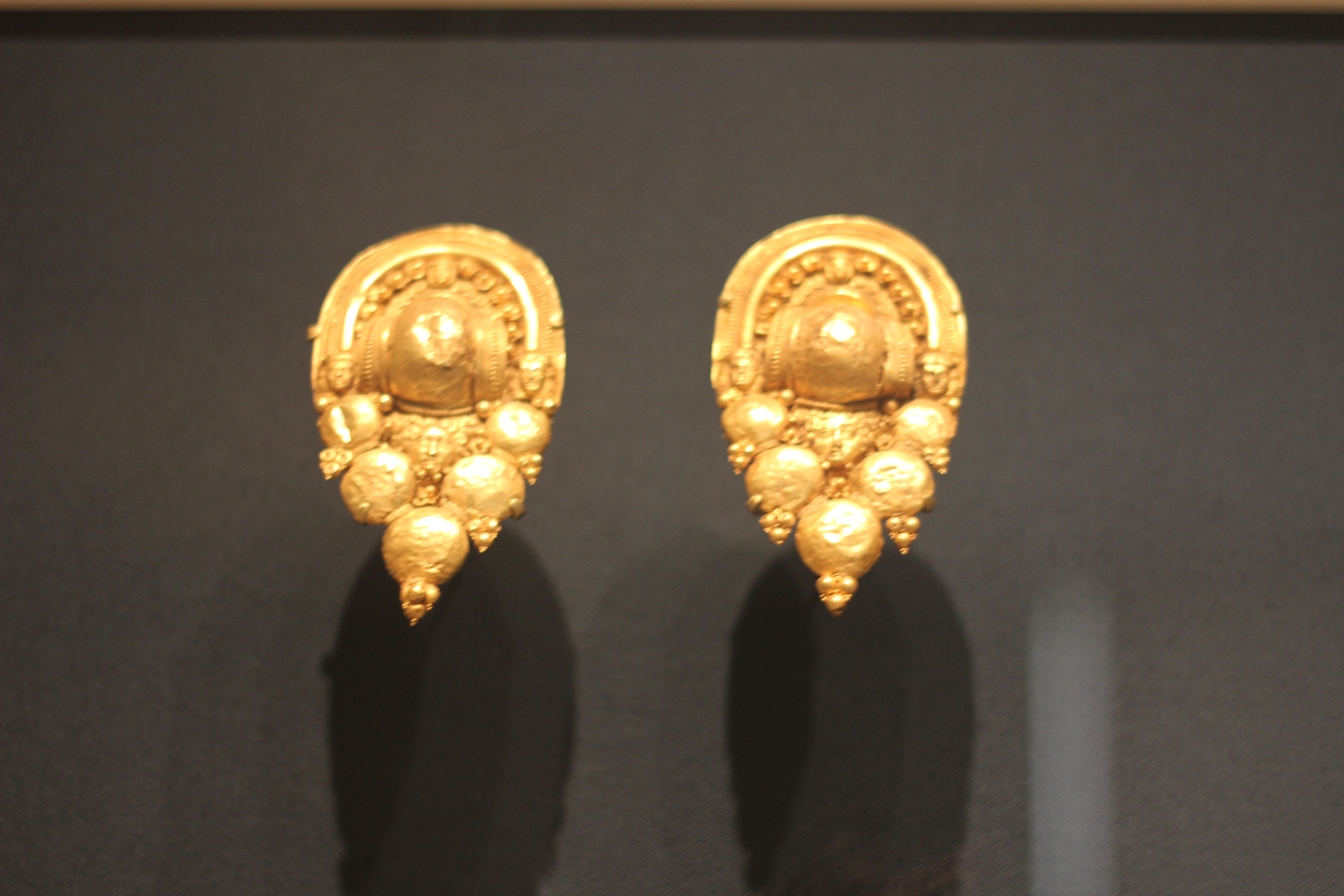
Pair of A-Grappolo Type Earrings, Etruscan, c.450-300 B.C.

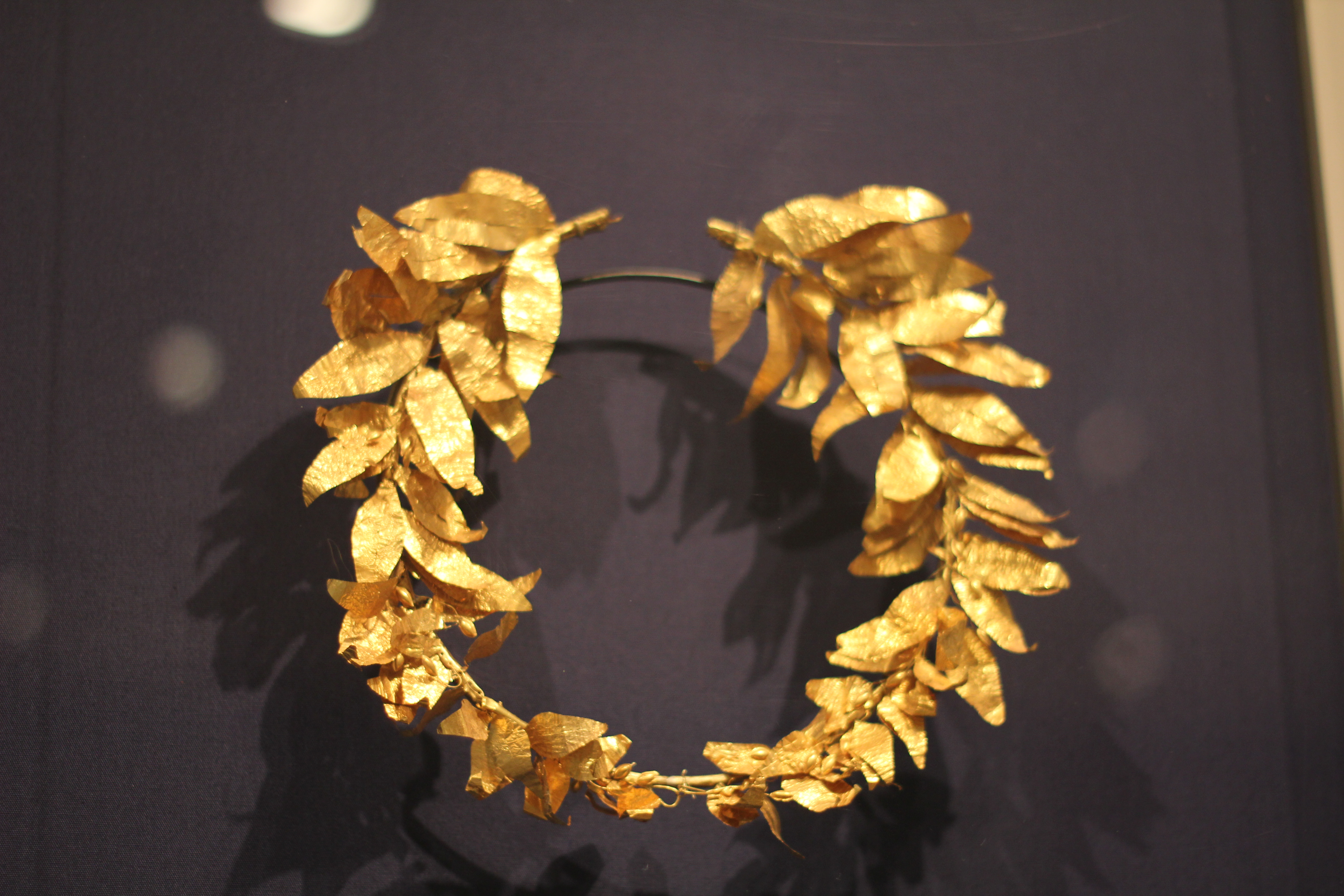
Gold Wreath, Greek, c.300-400 B.C.

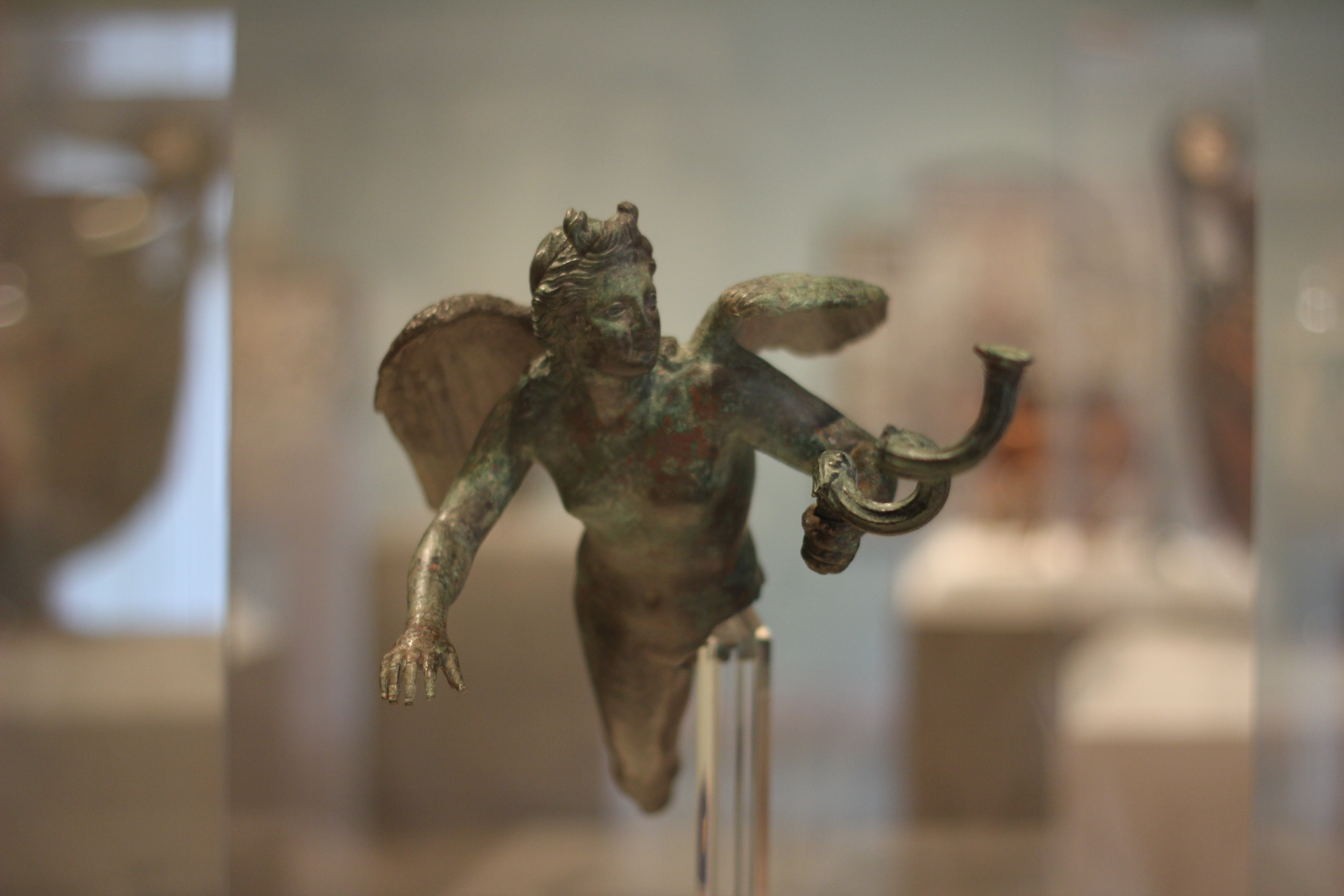
Eros Lamp Holder, Greek, c.25-50 B.C.

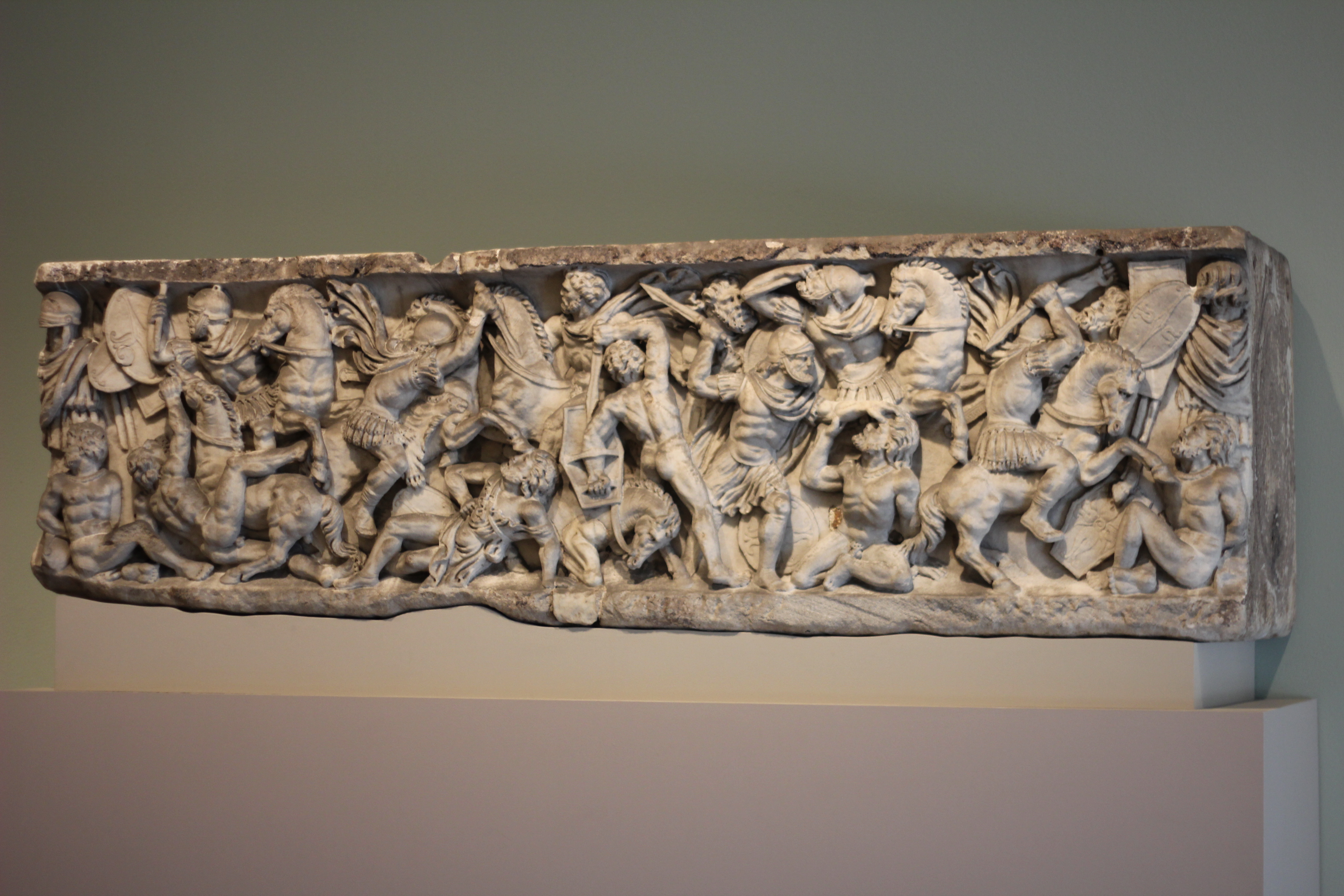
Sarcophagus with battle scene, Roman, c. 190 B.C.

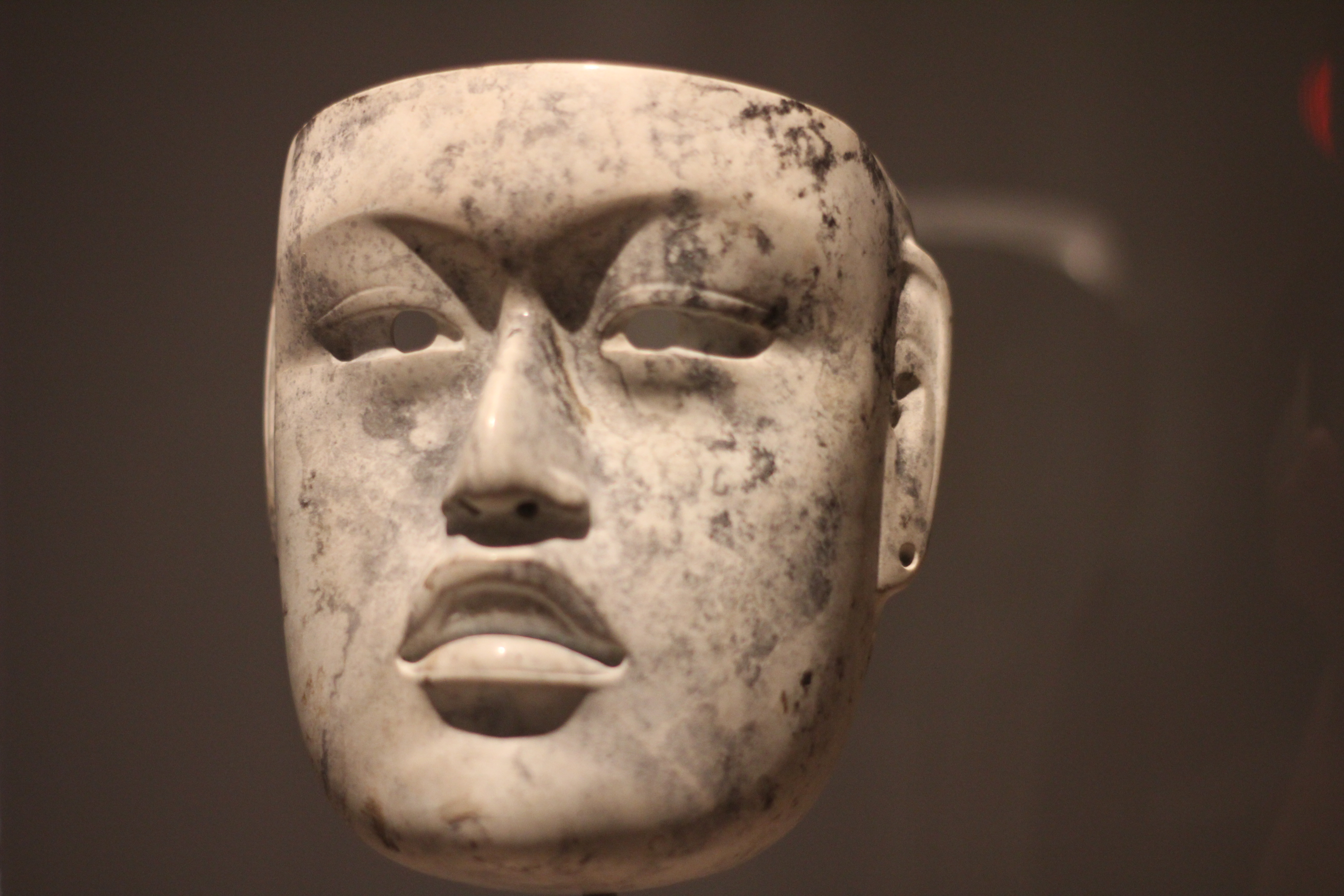
Mask, Mexico, State of Veracruz, 900-500 B.C.

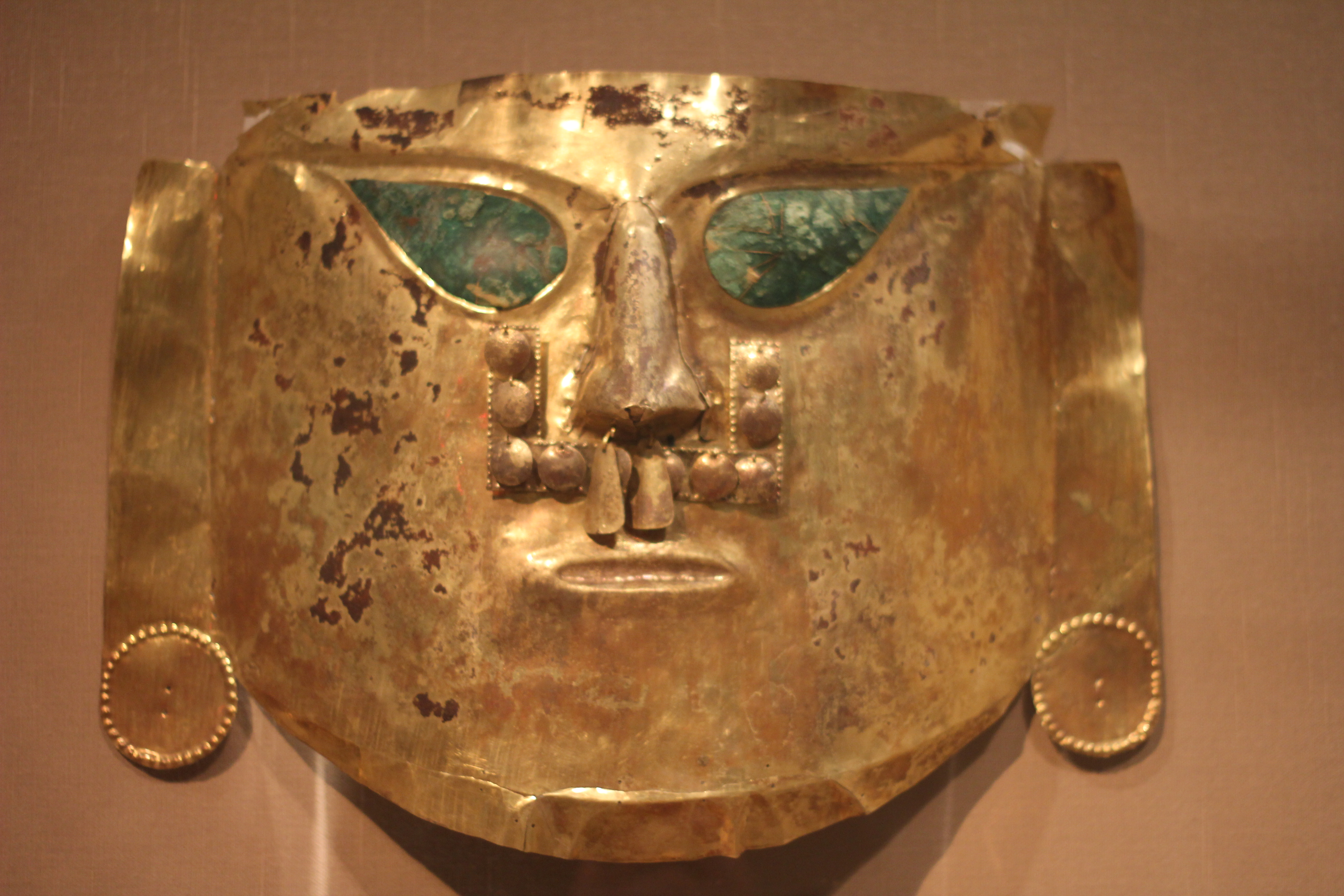
Ceremonial Mask, Peru, North Coast, La Leche Valley, c. 900-1100 A.D.
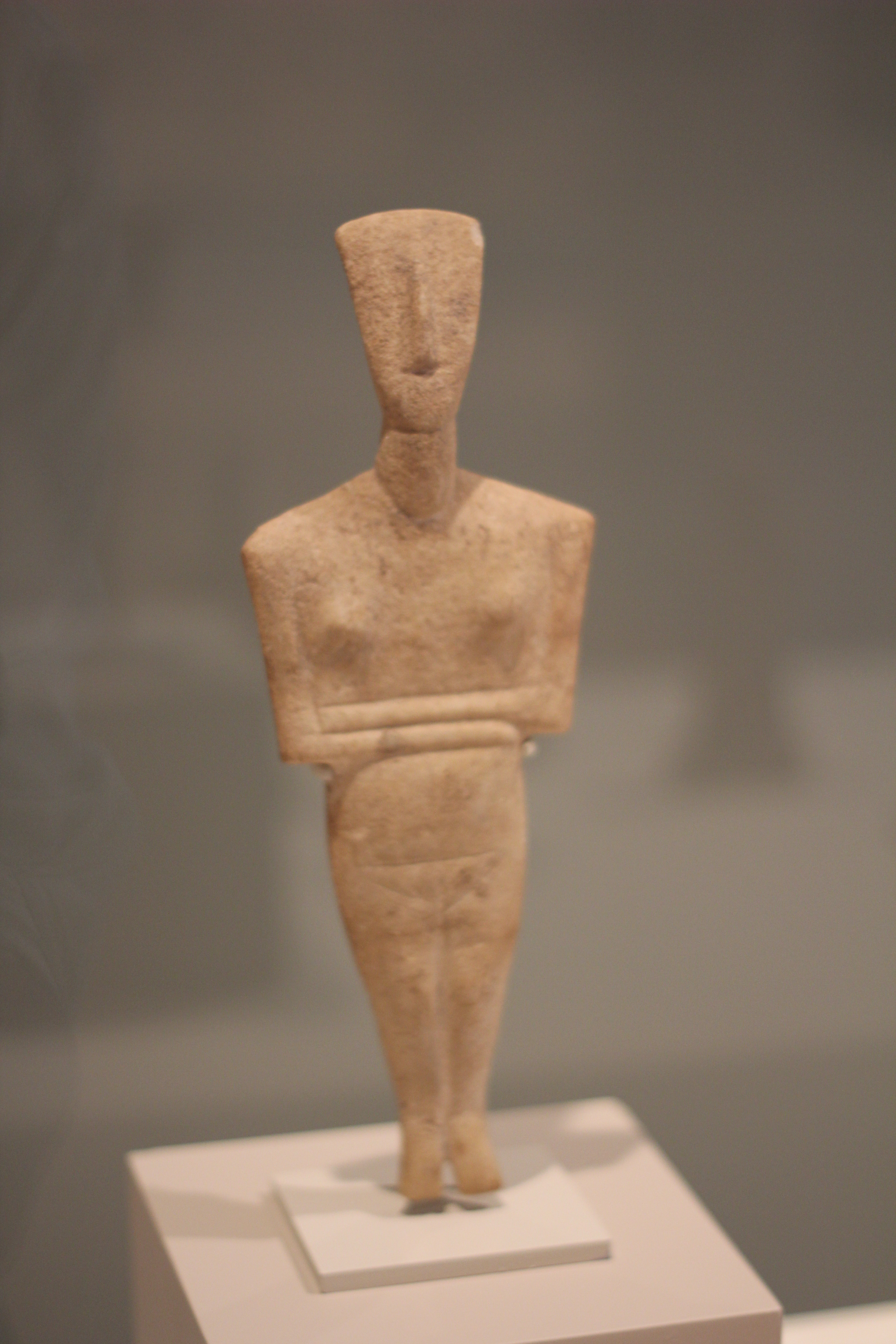
Cycladic Figurine, Greek, c.2700-2100 B.C.

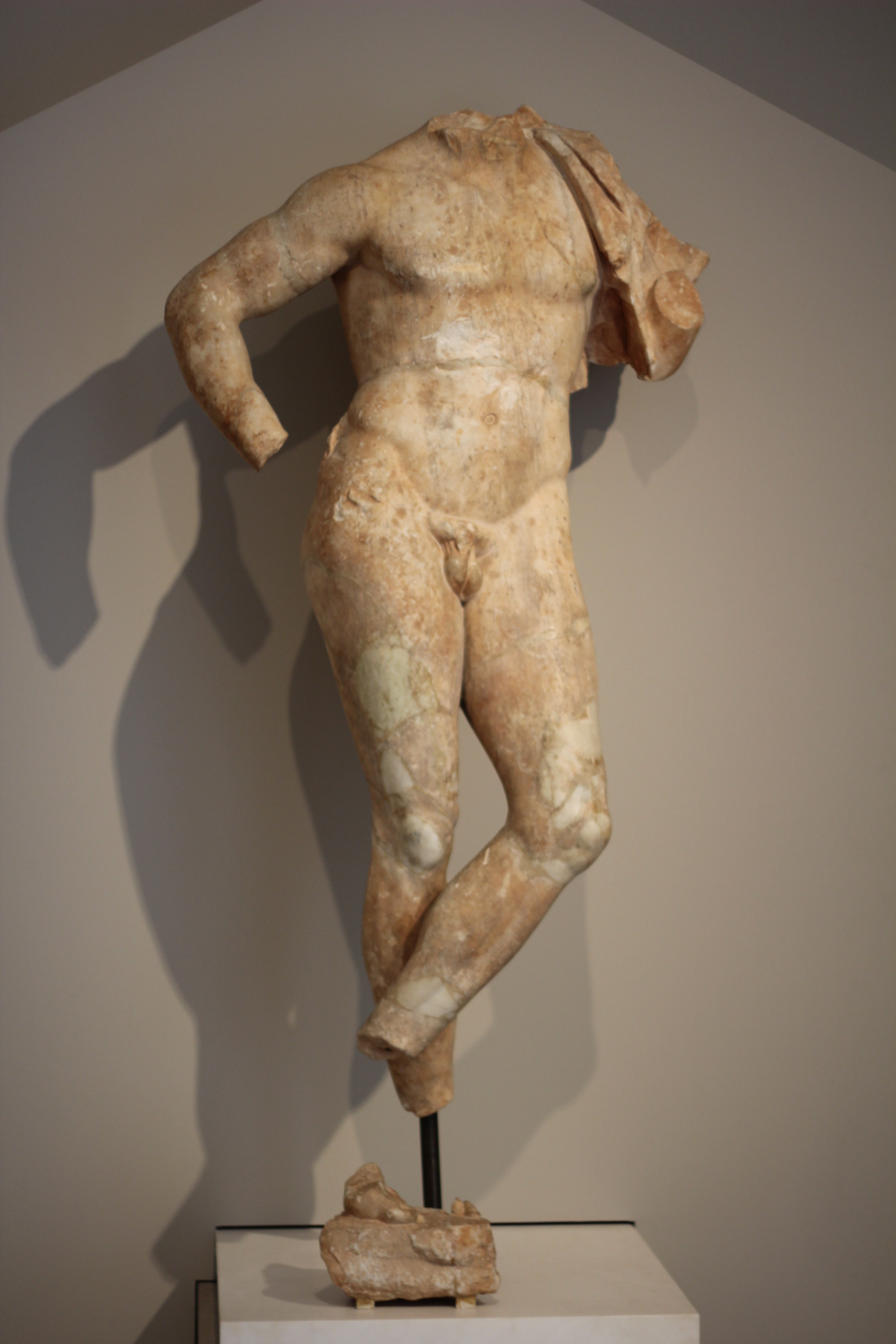
Figure of a Young Man, Greek, c.330 B.C.

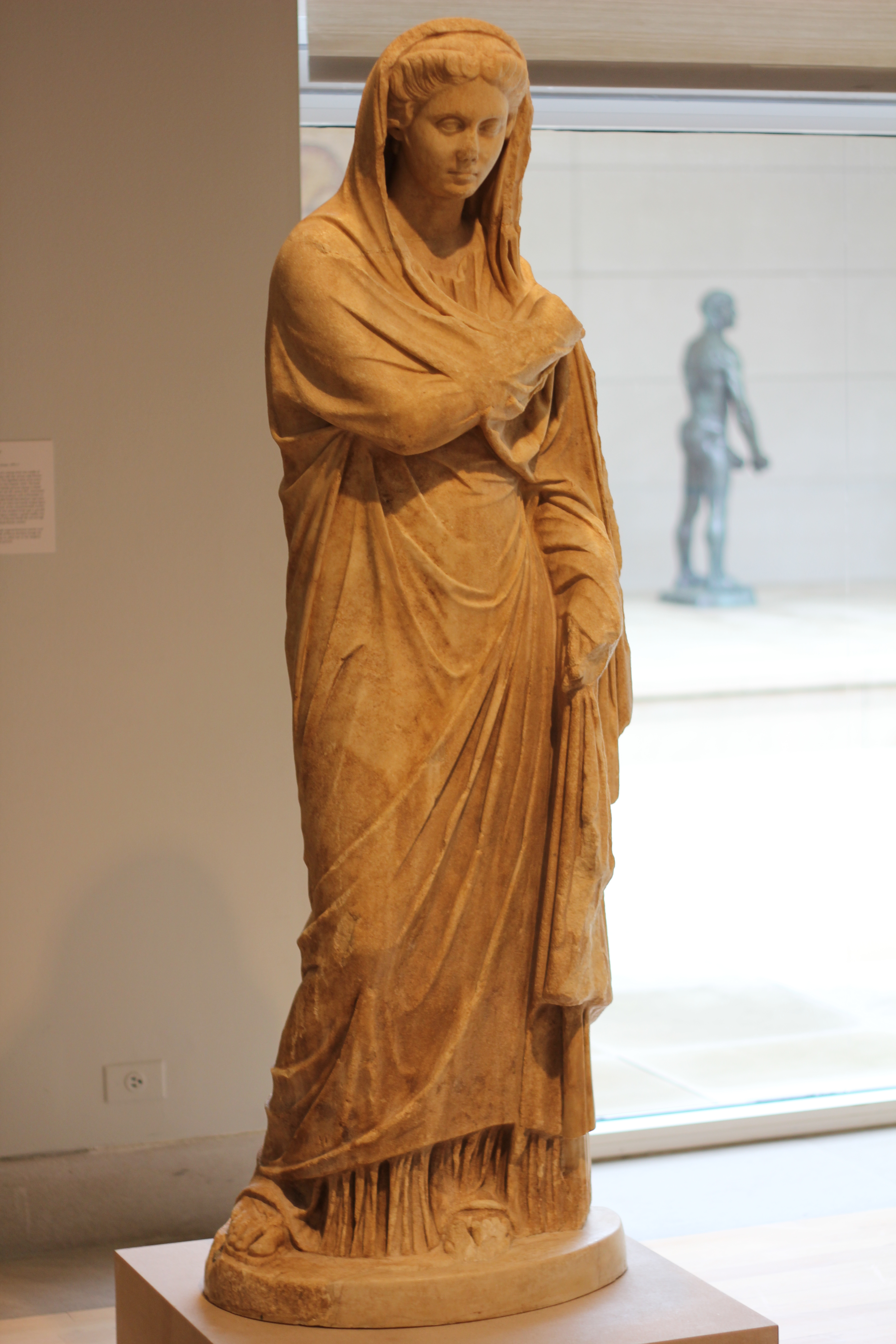
Figure of a Woman, Roman, c. 100-200 B.C.

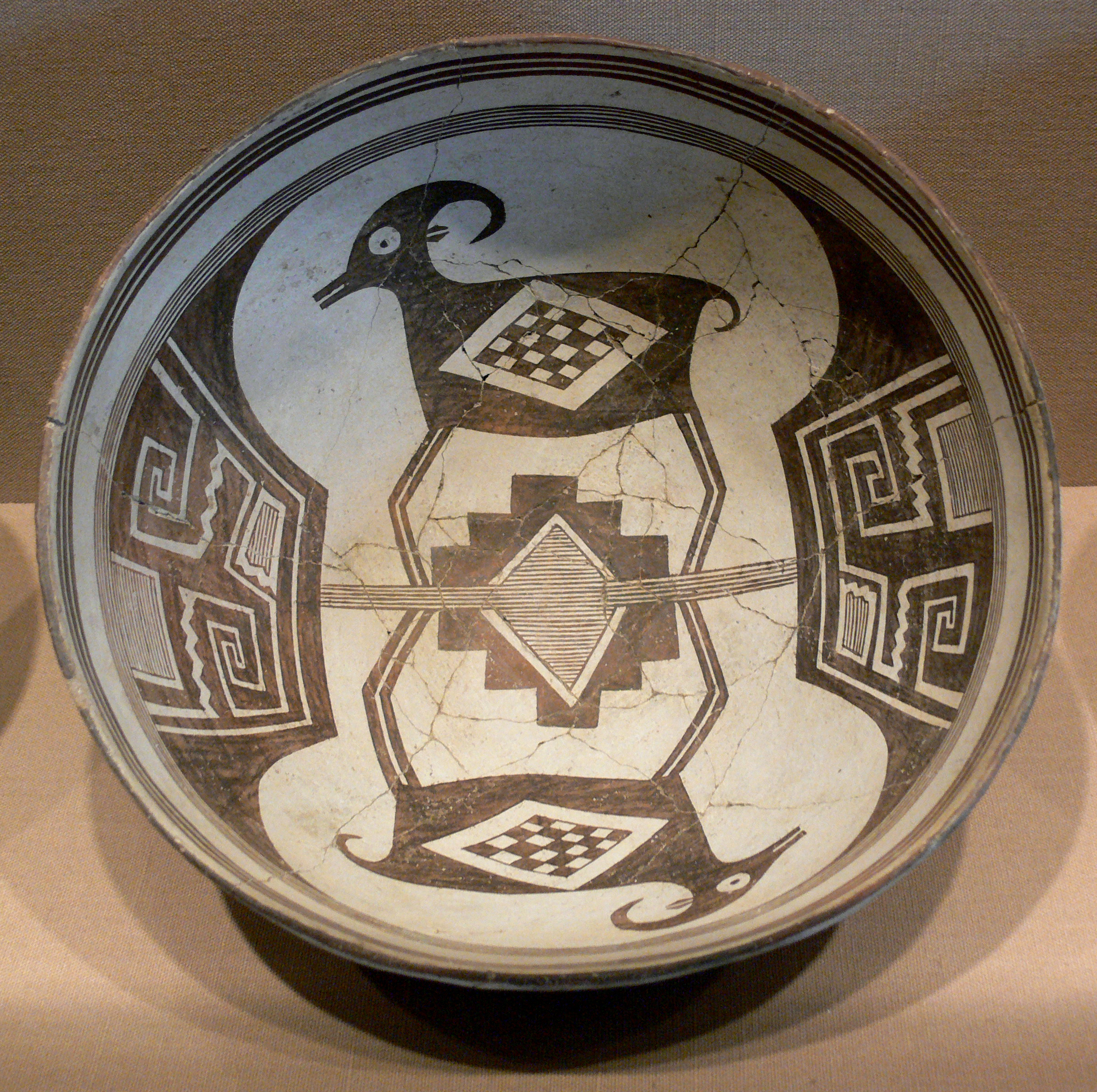
Mimbres Bowl with Bighorn Sheep and Geometrical Design, New Mexico, c. 1000-1150 A.D.

== See also ==
- American Art Collaborative
- Arts District, Dallas, Texas
- Nasher Sculpture Center
- Trammell & Margaret Crow Collection of Asian Art
- List of buildings and structures in Dallas, Texas
- List of largest art museums
- Statue of Laxmi-Narayan

== Bibliography ==
- Dallas Museum of Art 100 Years, Dorothy Kosinski with Lauren Schell (2003)
- Dallas Museum of Art, A Guide to the Collection, Managing Editor: Debra Wittrup (1997)
- Dallas Museum of Art
- Kevin W. Tucker, Elisabeth Schmuttermeier, Fran Baas: The Wittgenstein-Vitrine - Modern Opulence in Vienna, New Haven and London, 2016
