= Bodegón =

Spanish still-life genre in 17th century baroque painting

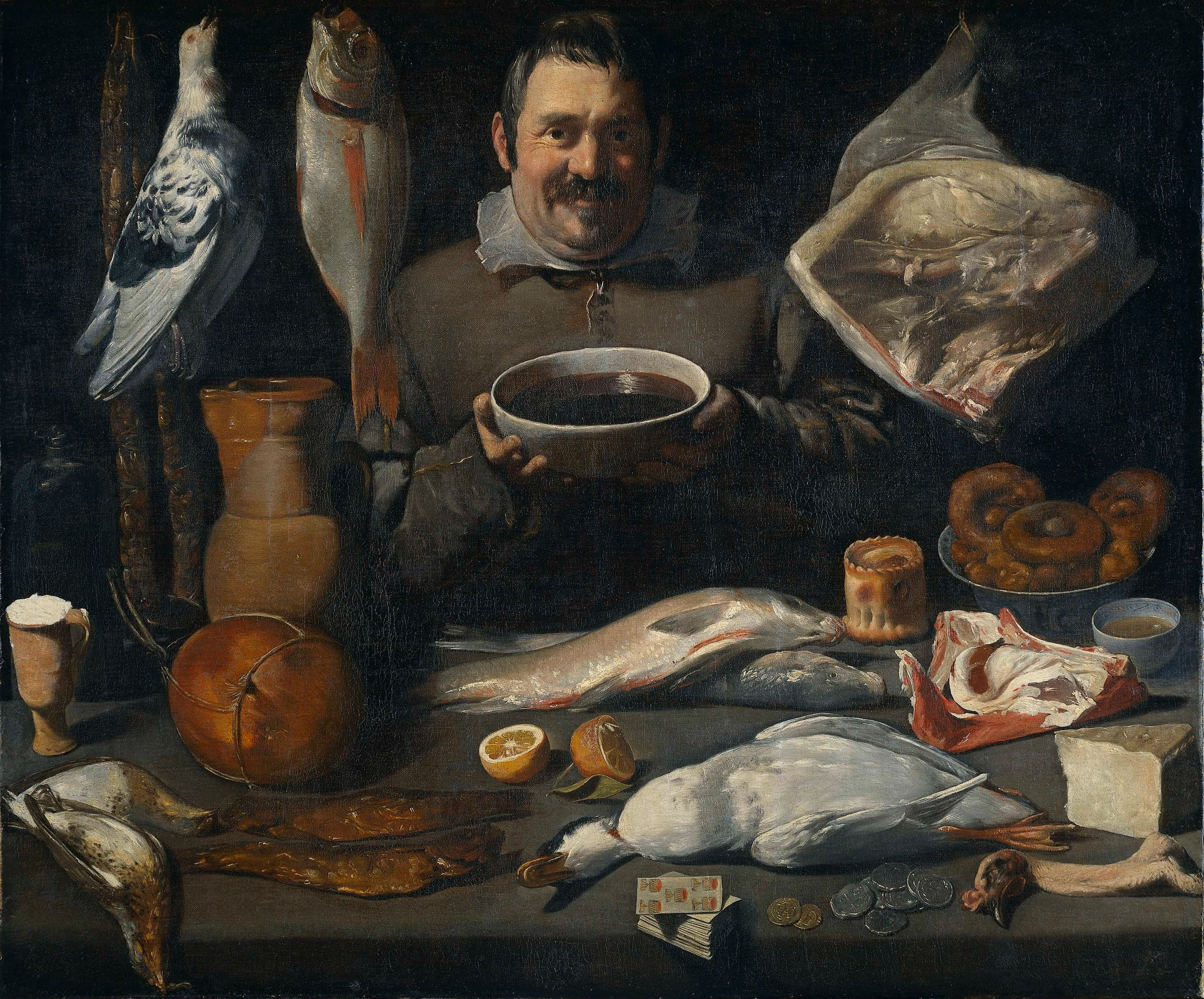
A bodegón by an unknown Spanish painter, Kitchen Scene, depicting most of the commonly employed motifs

Bodegóns are a type of painting from the 17th-century Spanish Baroque period, which are still lifes of food and household objects (mostly culinary) in undistinguished or humble surroundings. They sometimes depict commoners selling food, eating, or drinking. "Bodegón" is Spanish for "still life", yet the style is only one part of what are called "still lifes" in English.

The artistic objective of Spanish bodegón painters was to render the scene with impactful realism. Careful attention was dedicated to capture the textures of the objects and to create believable dimensionality, by using different types of brushstrokes and the technique of chiaroscuro. In many cases, bodegón paintings can be deemed as vanitas, a Baroque subgenre that had the purpose to remind viewers of the futility of pursuing earthly pleasures or craving for possessions considering death's inevitability. Certain objects that have a symbolic association with death were added to the compositions, including skulls, fading flowers, or decomposing food. Important painters of bodegones include Juan Sánchez Cotán, the style's pioneer; Alejandro de Loarte; Antonio de Pereda; Diego Velázquez; Francisco de Zurbarán; Juan de Arellano; and Luis Menéndez Pidal.

== History ==
In 17th century Spain, the term bodegón referred to an eating and drinking place for commoners, equivalent to a tavern, akin to the term "bodega". The term started to be used in the art world to refer to a type of pictorial composition that included common items such as food and kitchen utensils, like those which one would see in an actual "bodegón".

Juan Sánchez Cotán is considered the pioneer of the Spanish bodegón genre, with his painting Quince, Cabbage, Melon, and Cucumber ("Membrillo, repollo, melón y pepino").

The painter and art teacher Francisco Pacheco wrote in his 1649 painting textbook El Arte de la Pintura (The Art of Painting) that Spanish bodegones were a different genre than paintings of fruit, fish, fowl, meat, vegetables, saying they carry a deeper meaning, and are more than just "pretty pictures".

Spanish bodegones were very different from the still-lifes that were made popular by painters in Flanders and the Netherlands. These still-lifes depicted ornate and luxurious items or colorful flower arrangements. Their purpose was to generate an appreciation of fine objects and the enjoyment of sensorial pleasures.

Several Spanish bodegones fall into the category of vanitas paintings, which have the purpose to convey the very opposite: the futility of pursuing earthly pleasures or craving for wealth in light of the certainty of death. They are often dark and the objects are simple and commonplace. Rather than expensive curtains or mantels, the backgrounds are plain walls or just dark brown or black, as if in a room with a few candles.

== Bodegones by Diego Velázquez ==
The three paintings by Velázquez The Waterseller of Seville, Old Woman Frying Eggs, and The Lunch as bodegones by important Velázquez scholars like José López-Rey as they were considered at the time, influencing future painters of these types of compositions.

== Motifs ==
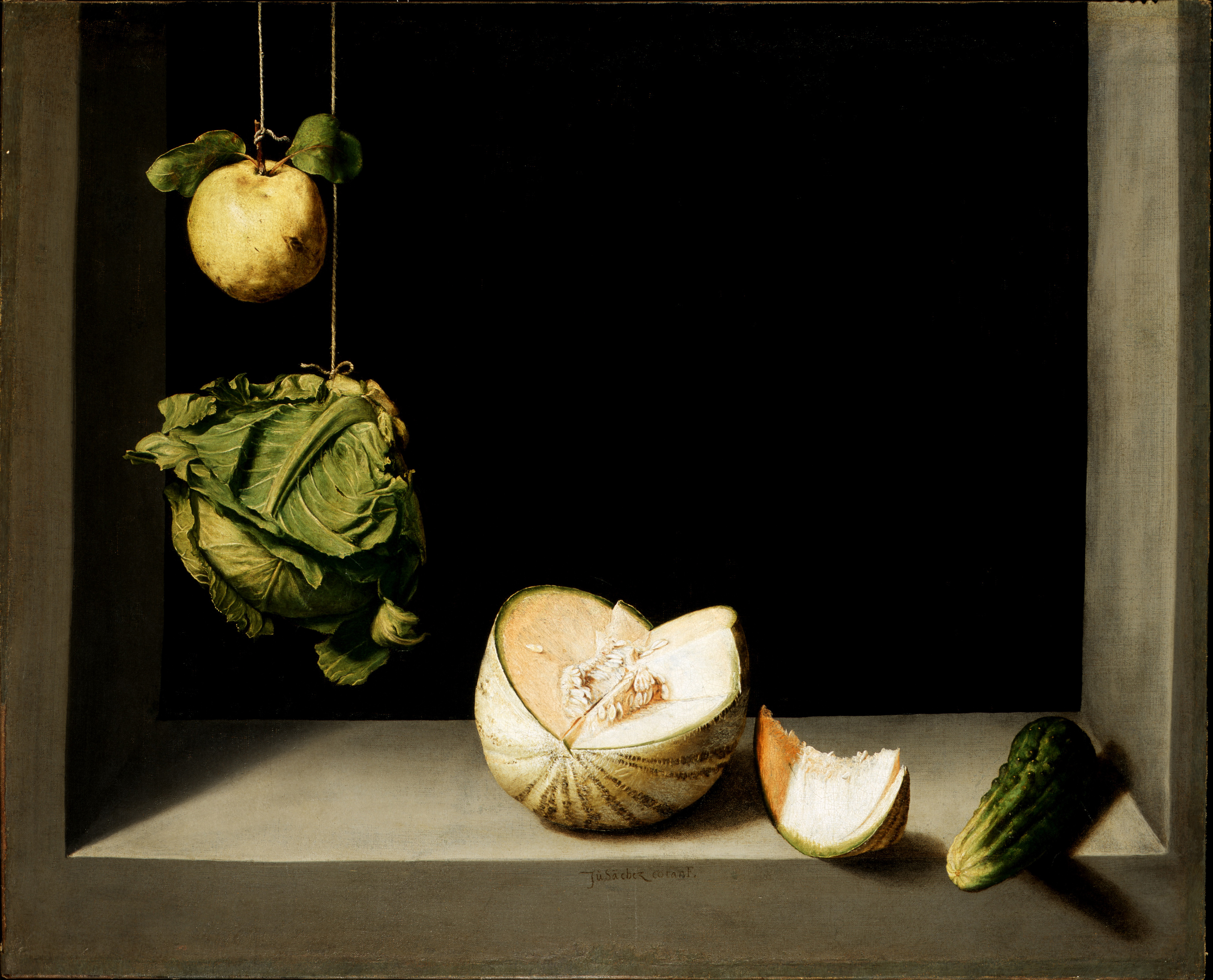
The painting that started the genre in Spain.
Still Life with Quince, Cabbage, Melon, and Cucumber by Juan Sánchez Cotán, 1602, San Diego Museum of Art.

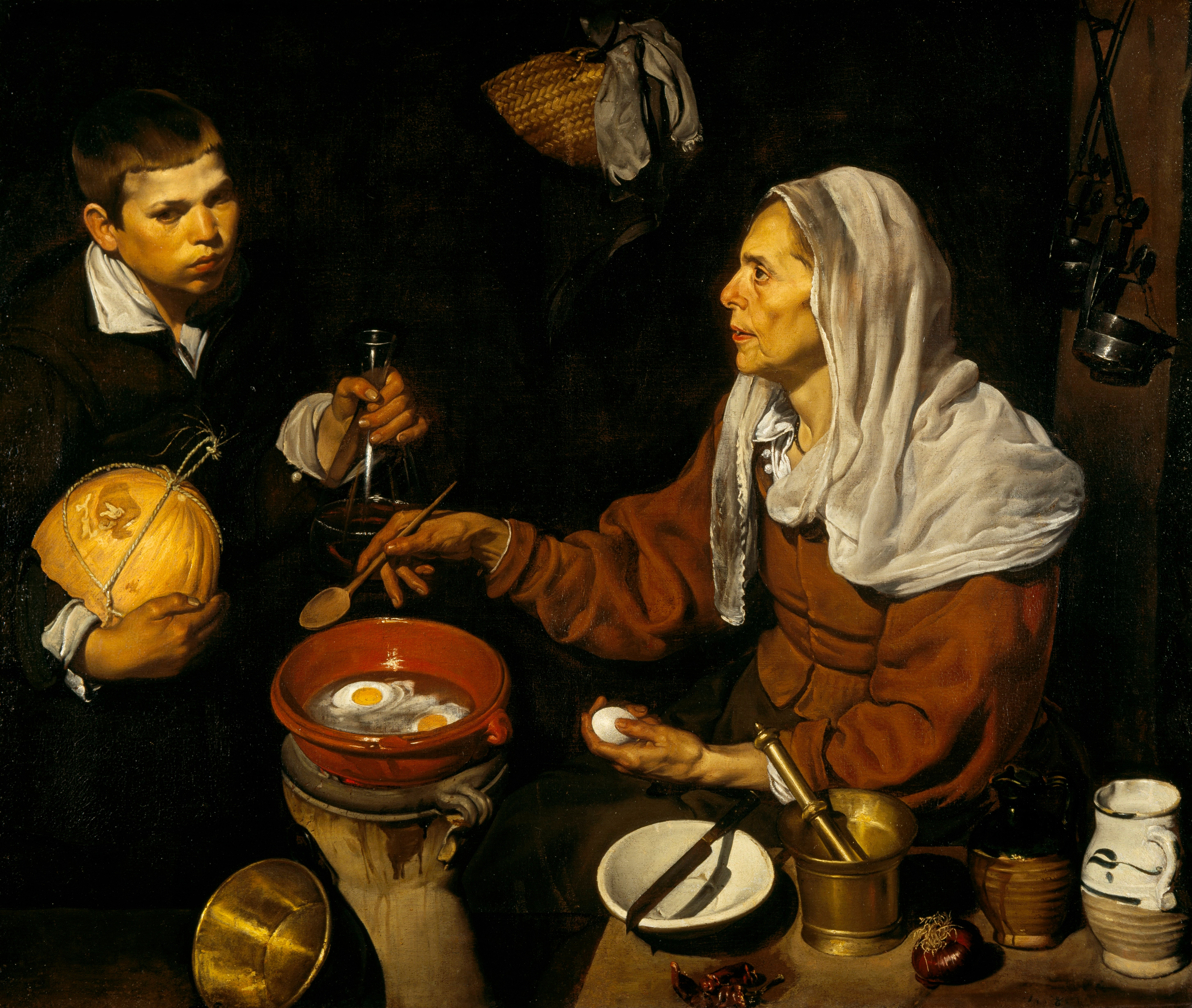
Bodegón with elements of genre painting.
An Old Woman Cooking Eggs by Diego Velázquez, 1618, Scottish National Gallery.

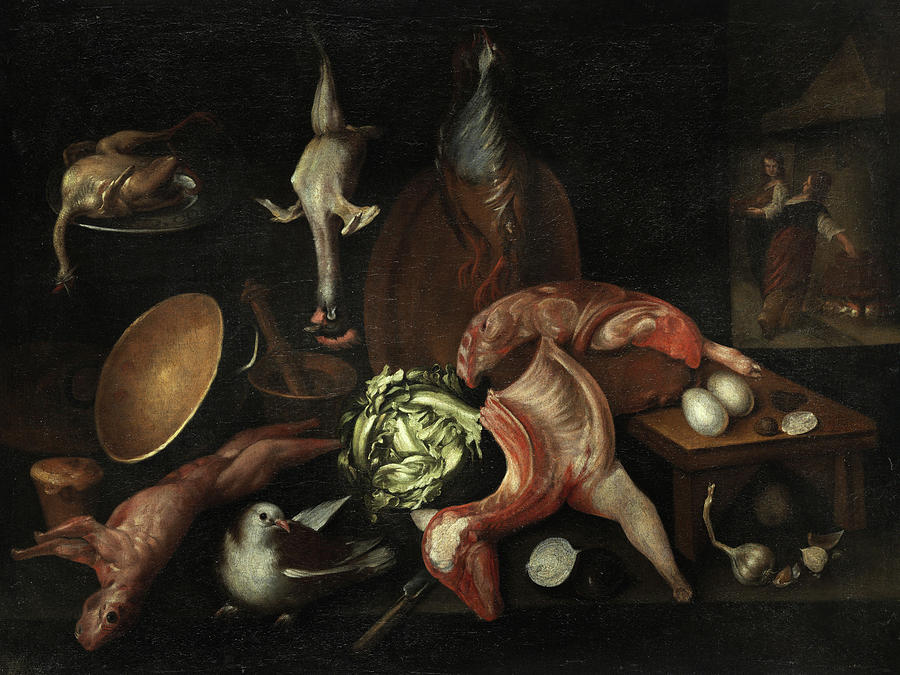
Bodegón with different types of meat.
Kitchen Still Life by Alejandro de Loarte, c. 1626, private collection.

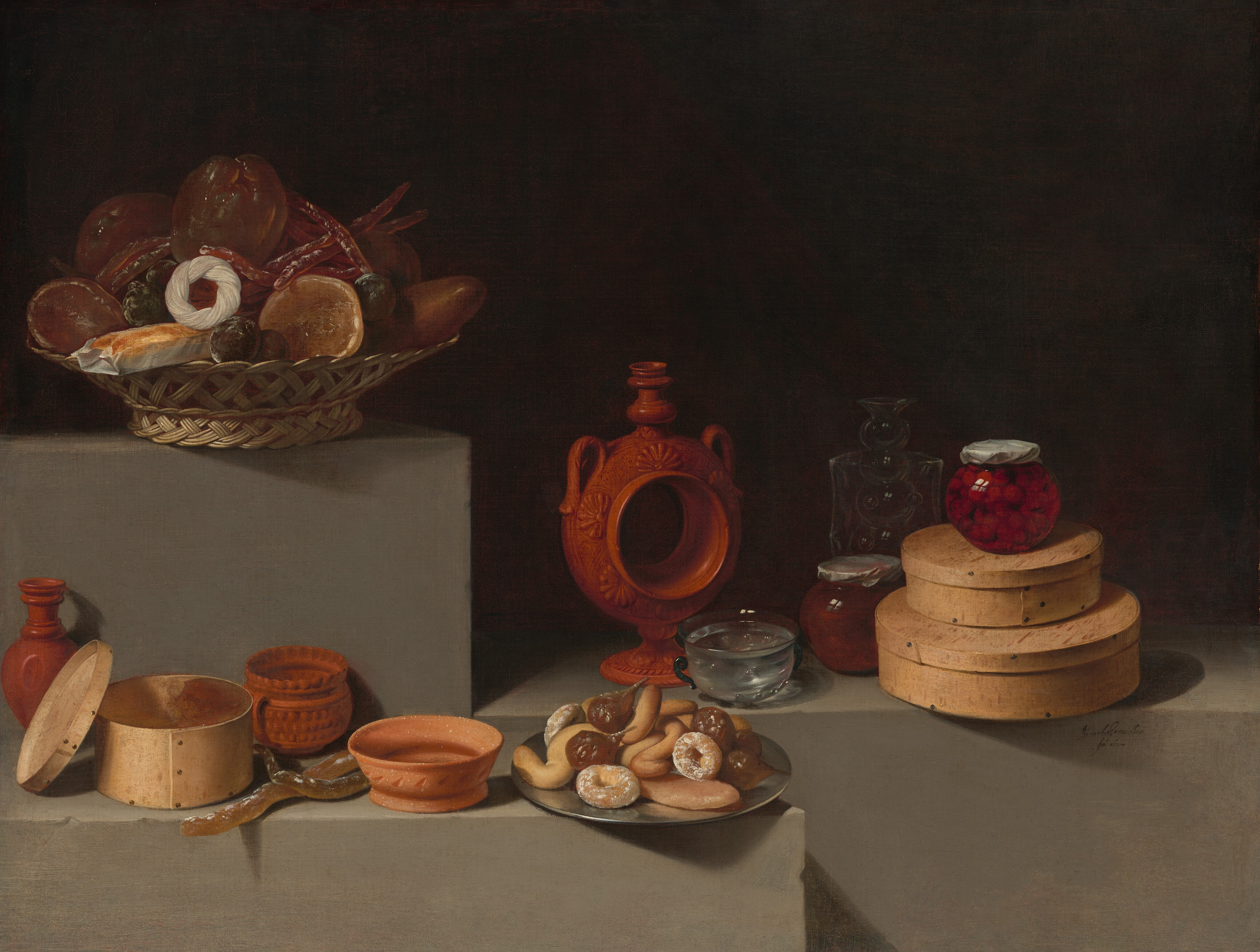
Still Life with Sweets and Pottery by Juan van der Hamen, 1627, London National Gallery.

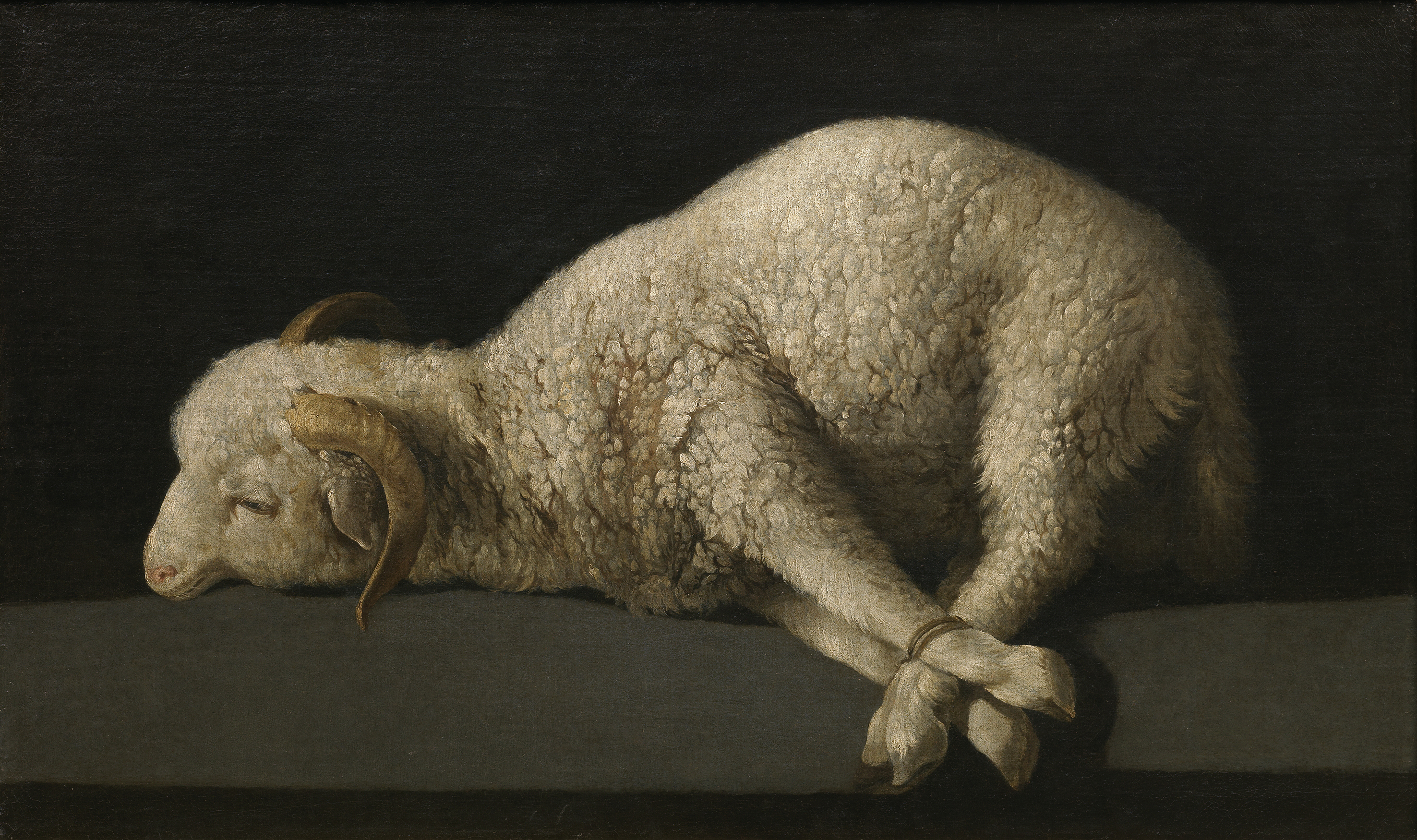
Bodegón with the religious theme, The Lamb of God.
Agnus Dei by Francisco de Zurbarán, 1635–40, Prado Museum.

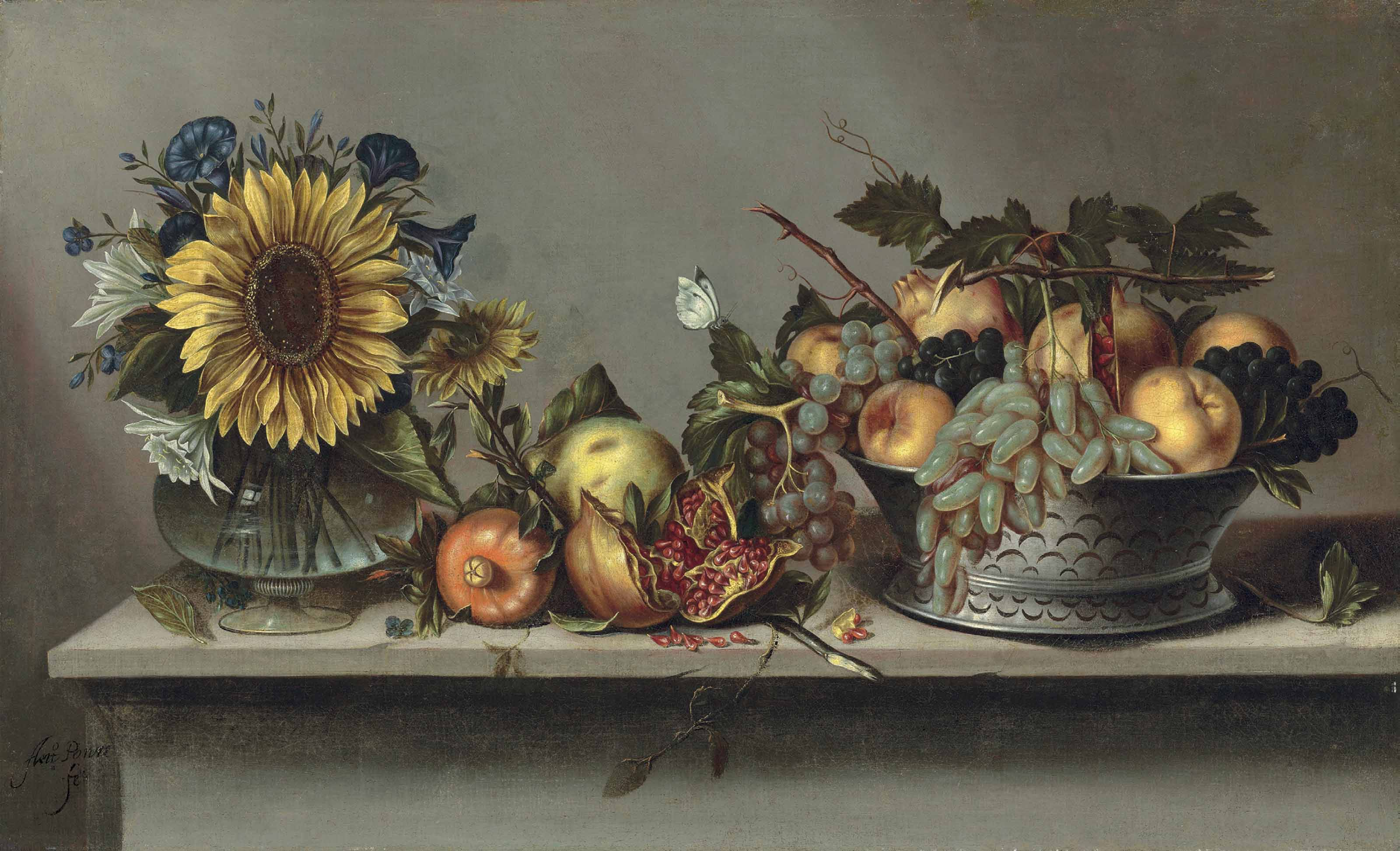
Still Life with Flowers in a Vase and a Fruit Bowl on a Ledge by Antonio Ponce, 1640–60, private collection.

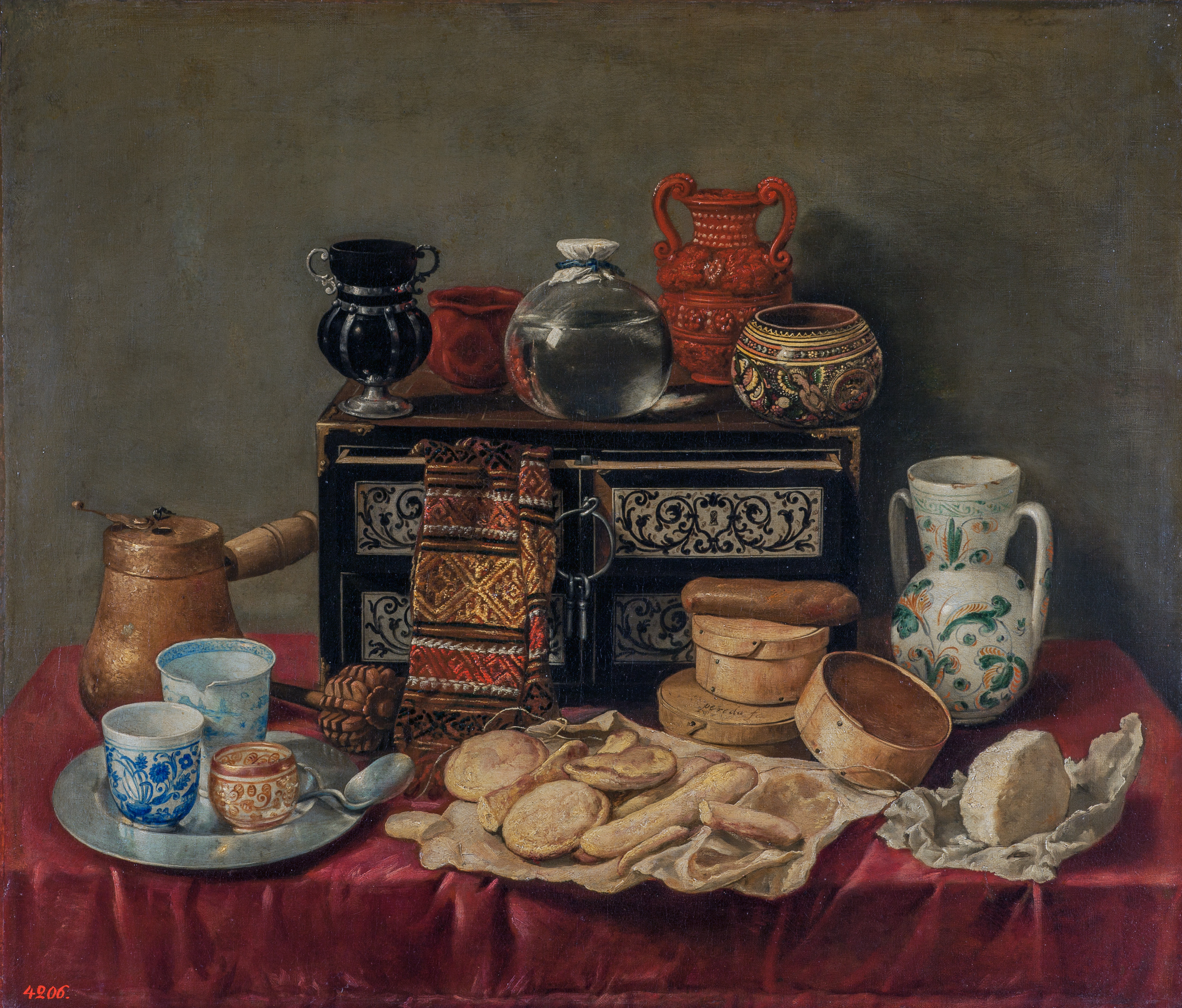
Furniture, delftware, maiolica, and ceramics.
Still Life with an Ebony Chest by Antonio de Pereda, c. 1652, Hermitage Museum.

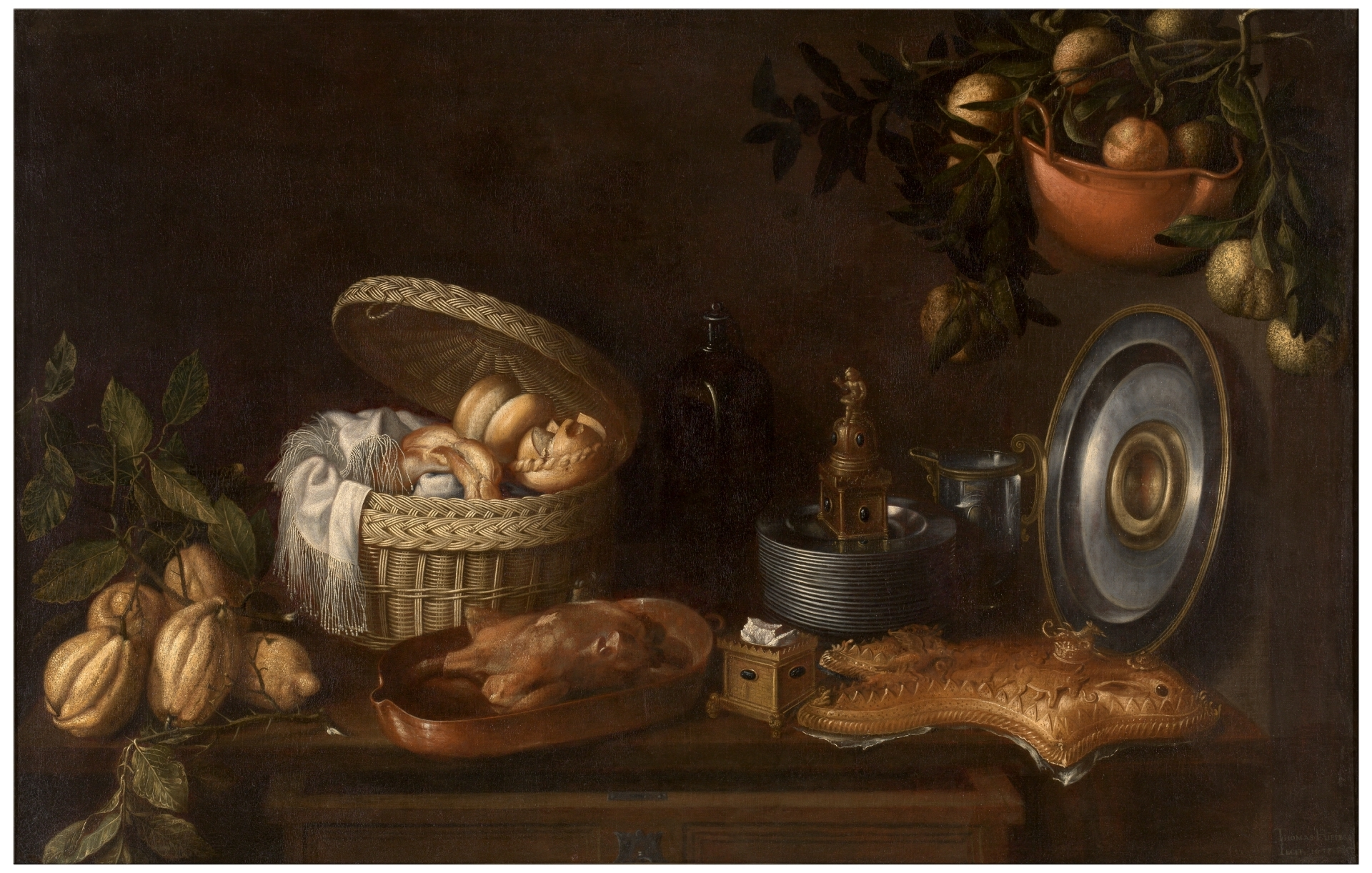
Baked food, metallic kitchenware, and fruits on branches.
Still Life by Tomás Yepes, 1668, Prado Museum.

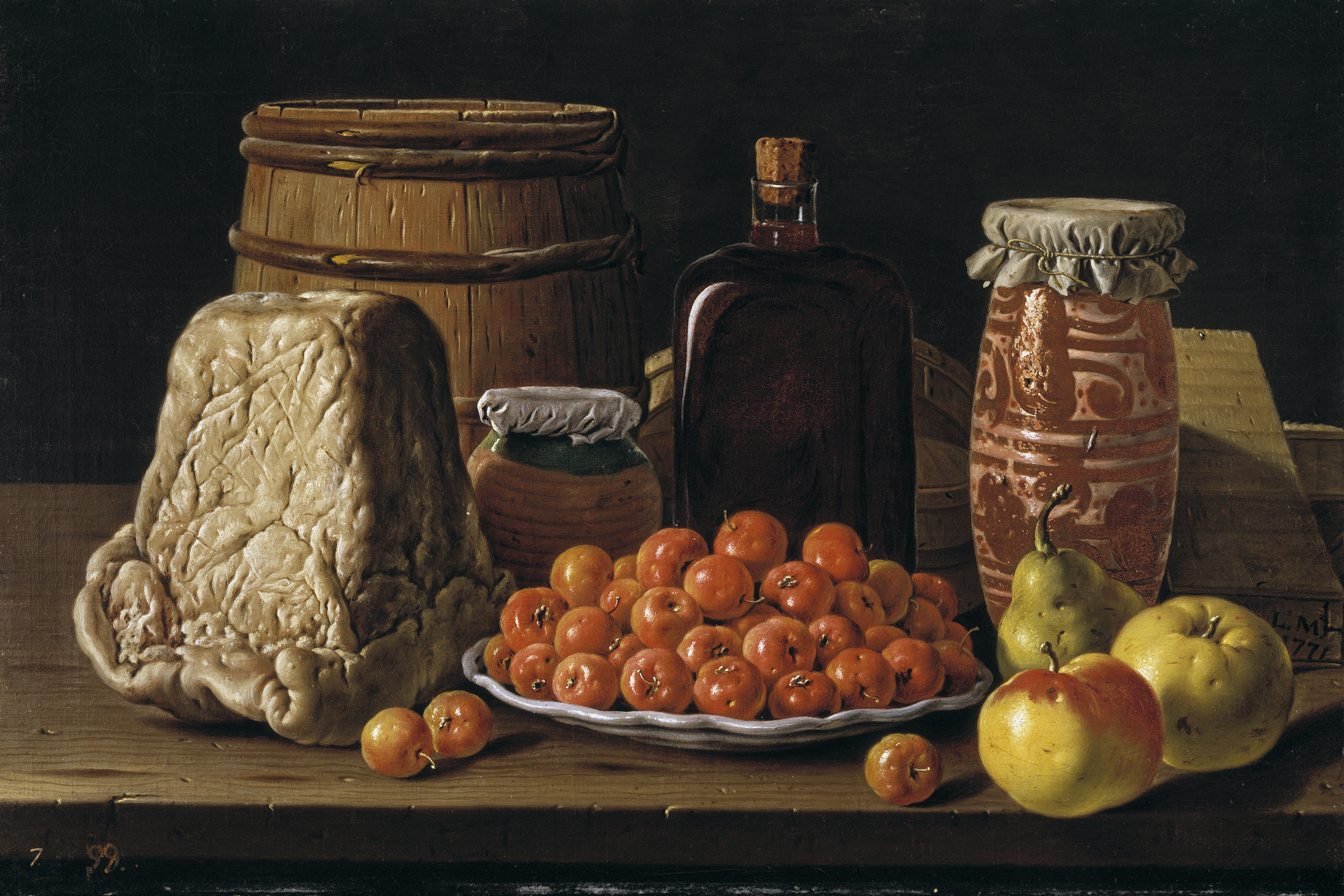
Cheese, barrel, glass bottle, fruits in decorative plate, storage jars and boxes.
Still Life with Fruit and Cheese by Luis Egidio Meléndez, 1771, Prado Museum.

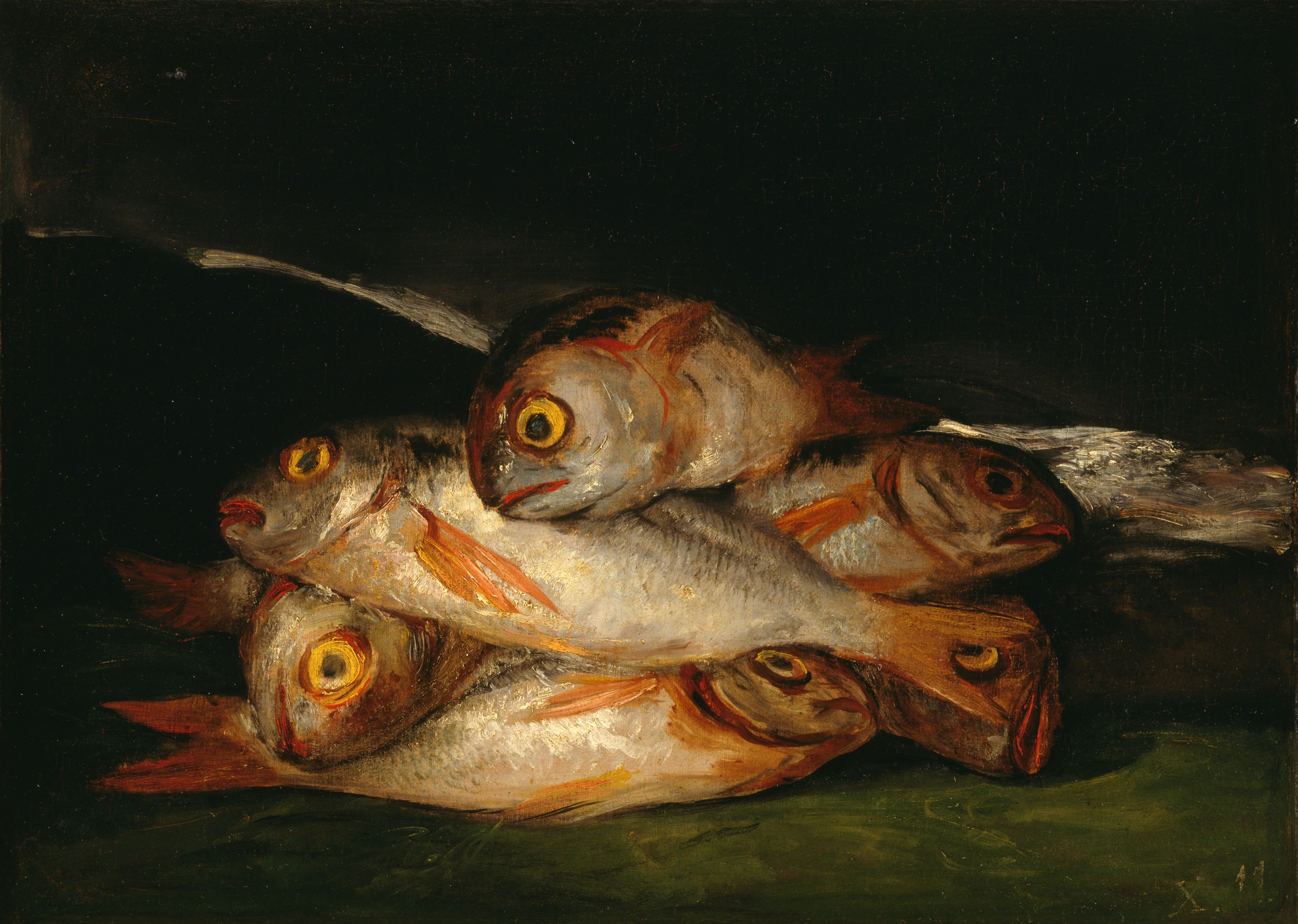
Pictorial allusion to his painting "Enterrar y callar (Bury them and keep quiet) of his The Disasters of War series.
Still Life with Golden Bream by Francisco Goya, 1808, Museum of Fine Arts, Houston.

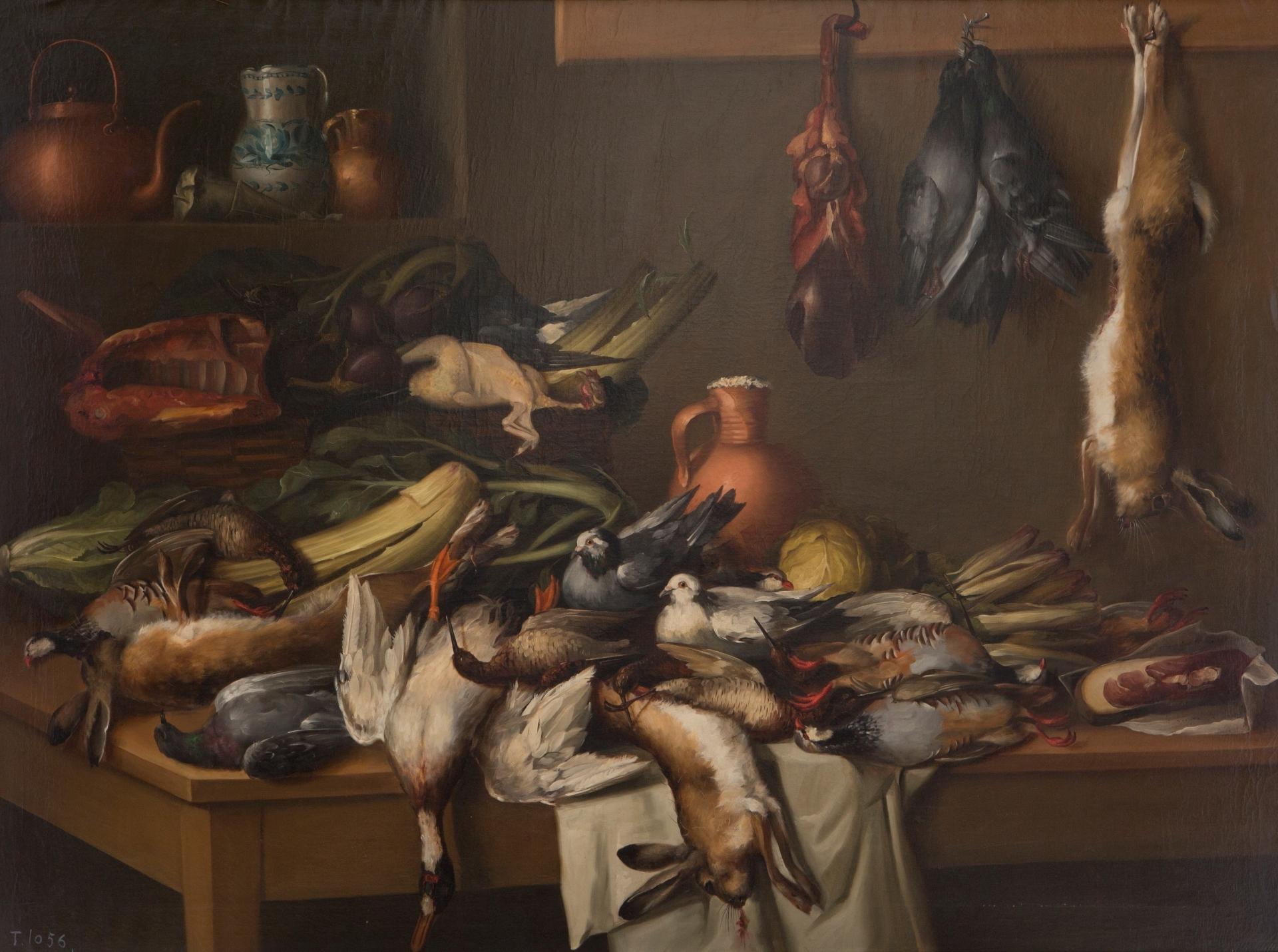
Pantry shelf, pitchers, and hunted game — various birds and hares.
Kitchen Still Life with Game and Vegetables by José María Corchón, 1850–55, Prado Museum.

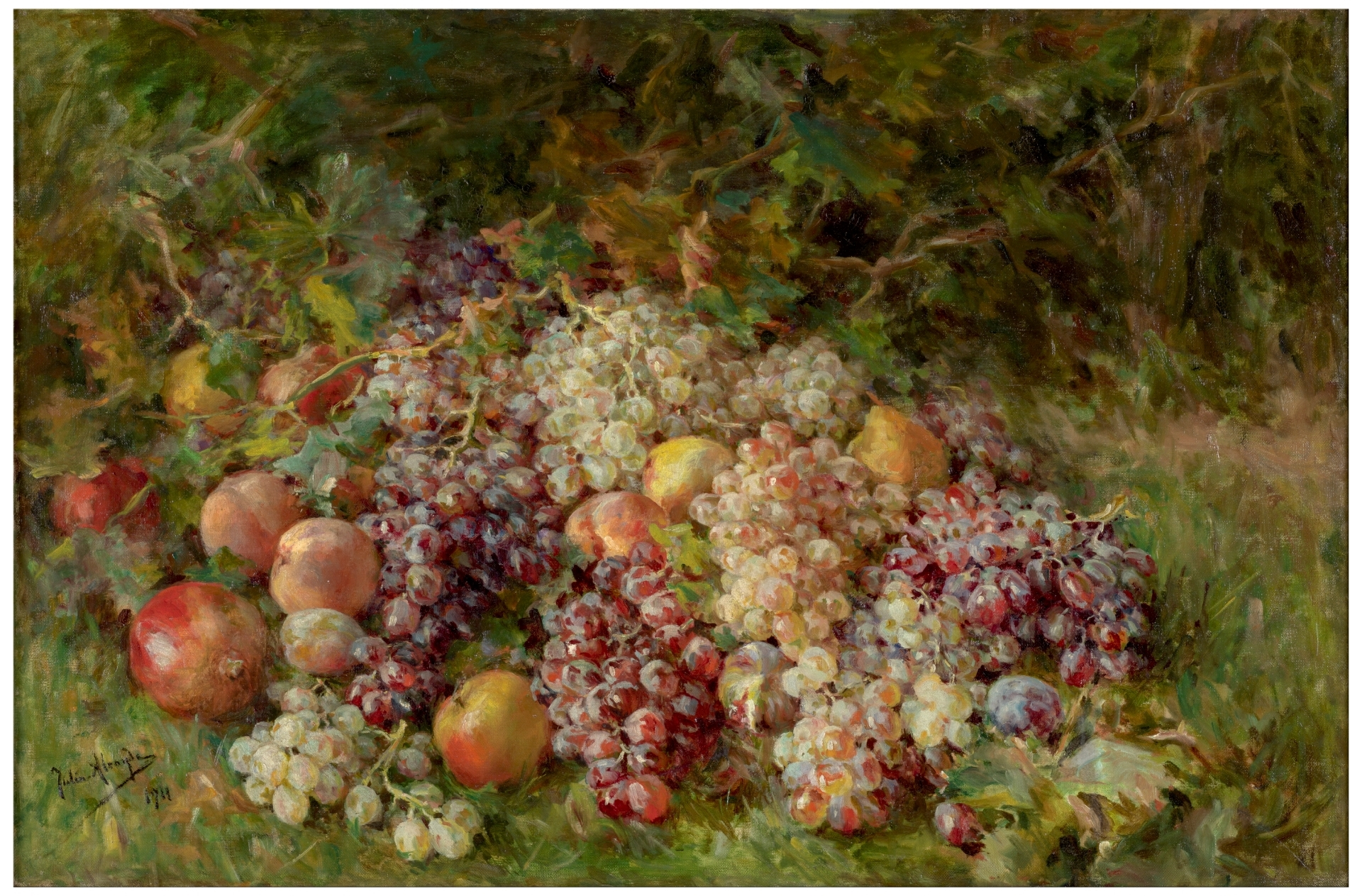
Grapes and landscape painting.
Fruits by Julia Alcayde y Montoya, 1926, Prado Museum.

== Bibliography ==
- Jordan, William B. (1985). Spanish Still Life in the Golden Age, 1600–1650. Fort Worth: Kimbell Art Museum. ISBN 978-0-912804-19-4.
- Jordan, William B.; Cherry, Peter (1995). Spanish Still Life from Velázquez to Goya. London: National Gallery. ISBN 978-1-85709-064-2.
- Nochlin, Linda' The Politics of Vision : Essays on Nineteenth-Century Art and Society. New York: Harper & Row, (1989). Page 30.
- JC Robinson: The Bodegones and Early Works of Velázquez, The Burlington Magazine for Connoisseurs,1906, page 172.
