= Quince, Cabbage, Melon and Cucumber =

Painting by Juan Sánchez Cotán, c.1602

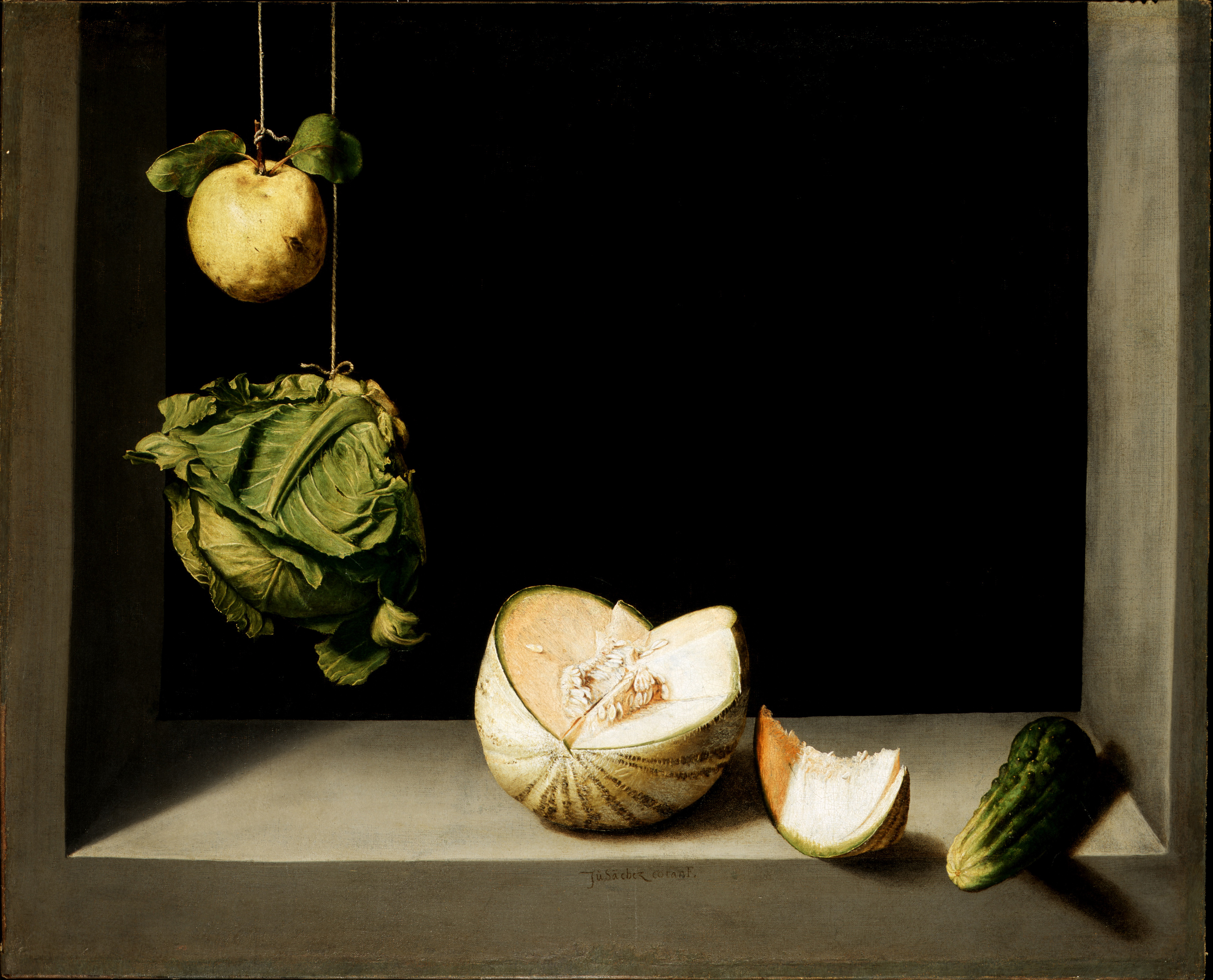
- Artist: Juan Sánchez Cotán
- Year: c. 1602
- Medium: Oil on canvas
- Dimensions: 67.8 cm × 88.7 cm (26.7 in × 34.9 in)
- Location: San Diego Museum of Art

Still Life with Quince, Cabbage, Melon, and Cucumber, commonly known as Quince, Cabbage, Melon and Cucumber, is a c. 1602 oil on canvas painting by Spanish painter Juan Sánchez Cotán. It is a still life painting of various fruits and vegetables. It is considered to be Cotán's masterpiece, and is on display at the San Diego Museum of Art.

== Background ==
Juan Sánchez Cotán was a wealthy Spanish still life painter, active in Toledo in the early 17th century. His best paintings are considered to be of fruits and vegetables. He later abandoned still lifes for religious figures after joining a Carthusian monastery.

== Composition and analysis ==
Still Life with Quince, Cabbage, Melon, and Cucumber, commonly known as Quince, Cabbage, Melon and Cucumber, was painted around 1602. It is an oil on canvas painting. In the painting, the titular food items are displayed on a window ledge, left to right. The quince and cabbage are suspended above the ledge by a thread, which was a common way of preserving food in the 17th century. The ledge is classified as a bodegón.

The painting is notable for its sculpture-like rendering of the food, as well as its illusory perspective; the cabbage and quince seem to be pushed backward from the melon, and the cucumber in front of it. Author Hanneke Grootenboer notes a strong contrast between the detail of the objects and the black background; even without any depth portrayed in the background, the depth can still be felt. Author Norman Bryson notes how the objects seem to be divorced from their purpose as a means of people's nourishment, which is derived from the objects' motionlessness and weightlessness, relative to other still lifes. The order of the geometric shapes are used in the painting not as a tool to help illustrate the subject, but rather, the geometrical order seems to be "explored for [its] own sake". The separation between the objects and their purpose as nourishment may be intentional, as fasting was practiced by the Carthusians in an attempt to distance the human body from the material world; the black background may add to this idea. As author Siri Hustvedt writes, "This space can't be seen as a reference to any actual space. It is intentionally unreal and abstract, and it [the background] represents not a solid wall but infinity. This is food as sacred gift shining inside a system of precise relations ordained by God". Cotán joined the Carthusians in 1603 or 1604, yet they are still seen as an influence.

== Legacy ==
In 1818, the exiled former king of Spain, Joseph Bonaparte, sold the painting to the Pennsylvania Academy of Fine Arts. The painting is currently on display at the San Diego Museum of Art. John Marciari, the museum's curator of European art, said the painting is "universally acclaimed" as Cotán's masterpiece. For many years, the painting's purpose and historical background have been debated.

American painter John Clem Clarke did a photorealistic version of the artwork in 1970. In 2003, Swedish artist Kristoffer Zetterstrand made Graham, an oil painting taking large inspiration from Quince, Cabbage, Melon and Cucumber, replacing the melon with King Graham, a character from the 1980 video game King's Quest. This rendition of the painting was later popularized with its inclusion in Minecraft in 2010. In 2006, Israeli photographer Ori Gersht recreated the painting, but replaced the quince with a pomegranate—which is being hit a bullet, which Gersht used to represented violence in Jerusalem.

== Sources ==
- Shimamura, Arhur (2015). Experiencing Art: In the Brain of the Beholder, Oxford University Press. ISBN 9780199791538
- Grootenboer, Hanneke (2005.) The Rhetoric of Perspective: Realism and Illusionism in Seventeenth-Century Dutch Still-Life Painting, University of Chicago Press. ISBN 9780226309705
- Bryson, Norman (2013). Looking at the Overlooked: Four Essays on Still Life Painting, Reaktion Books. ISBN 9781780232522
- Hustvedt, Siri (1998). Yonder: Essays, Henry Holt and Company. ISBN 9780805050110
- Hustvedt, Siri (2006). Mysteries of the Rectangle: Essays on Painting, Princeton Architectural Press. ISBN 9781568986180
- Hodge, A.N. (2016). The History of Art, Rosen Publishing Group. ISBN 9781499464030
- Kallendorf, Hilaire (2018). A Companion to the Spanish Renaissance, Brill. ISBN 9789004360372
- Robbins, Jeremy (2022). Incomparable Realms: Spain During the Golden Age, 1500–1700, Reaktion Books. ISBN 9781789145380
- Jane Milosch, Nick Pearce (2019). Collecting and Provenance: A Multidisciplinary Approach, Rowman & Littlefield Publishers. ISBN 9781538127582
- Holt, Elizabeth Gilmore (2022). A Documentary History of Art, Volume 2: Michelangelo and the Mannerists, The Baroque and the Eighteenth Century, Princeton University Press. ISBN 9780691242910
