= Granada Charterhouse =

Monastery in Granada, Spain

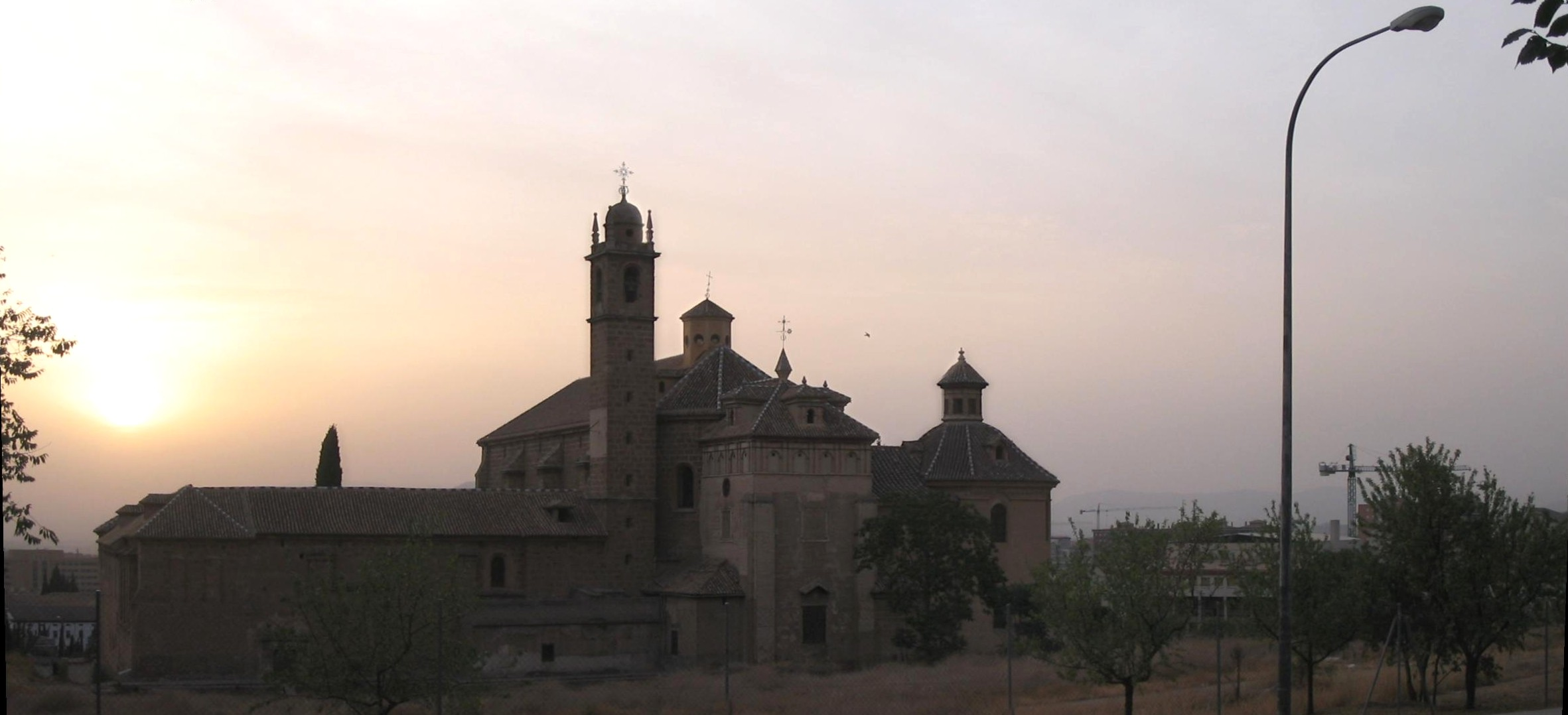
Exterior of the Charterhouse (viewed in the sunset)

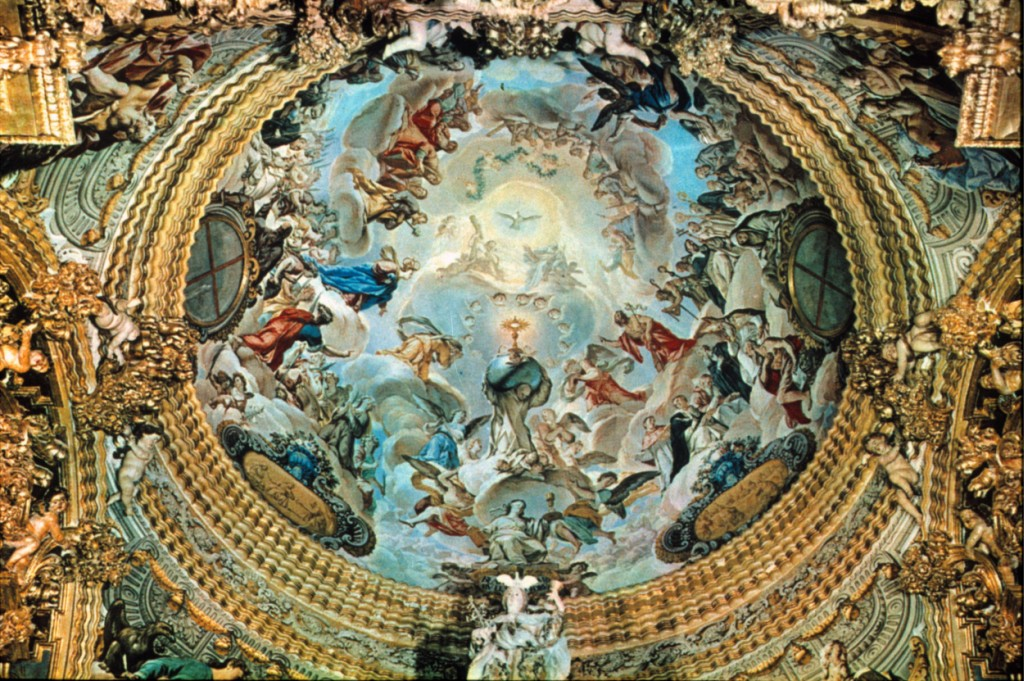
Dome of the tabernacle of Granada Charterhouse. Frescoes by Acisclo Antonio Palomino de Castro

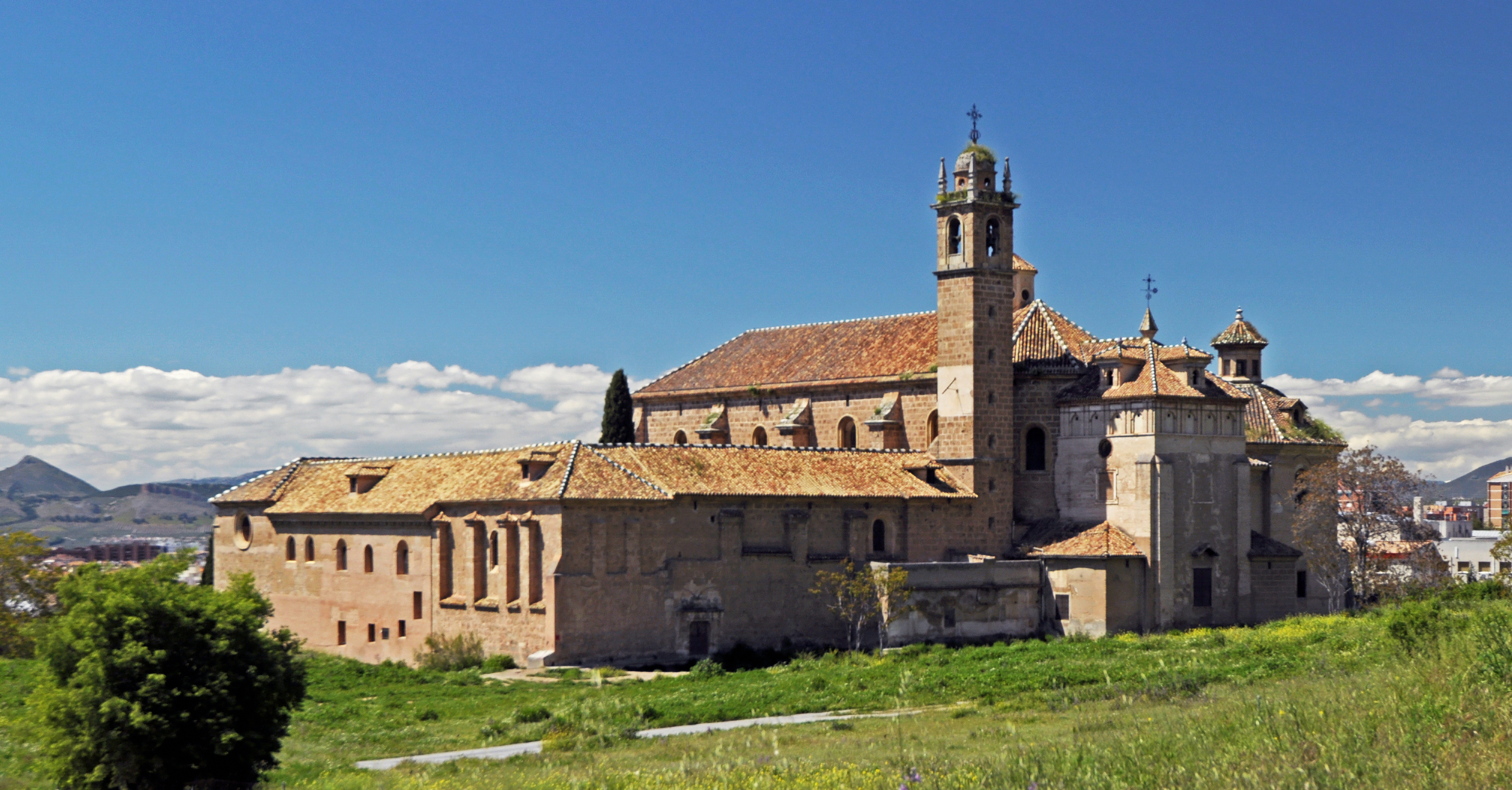
View of the Monastery from the south-east

Granada Charterhouse (Spanish: Cartuja de Granada) is a Carthusian monastery in Granada, Spain. It is one of the finest examples of Spanish Baroque architecture.

The charterhouse was founded in 1506; construction started ten years later, and continued for the following 300 years. While the exterior is a tame ember in comparison, the interior of the monastery's is a flamboyant explosion of ornamentation. Its complex echoing geometric surfaces make of it one of the masterpieces of Churrigueresque style. The most striking features include the tabernacle, constructed to a design by Francisco Hurtado Izquierdo, the church and the famous sacristy, built between 1727 and 1764 by Luis de Arévalo and F. Manuel Vasquez. The charterhouse displays an extensive collection of paintings, prominent among which the works of Fray Juan Sánchez Cotán.

== History ==
It arose from the decision made in 1458 by the community of the monastery of Santa María de El Paular. Construction began in 1506 once its site was established, after the transfer of land by the Great Captain, Gonzalo Fernández de Córdoba. The current site does not correspond to the land ceded by the Grand Captain so it was disrelented from the project. In 1516 works that would last three centuries were restarted without finishing the initial project, and of which only part is preserved, because in 1842 the cloister and monk's cells were destroyed. The priory house was affected; it was totally destroyed in 1943. The monastery was inhabited until 1835 when the monks were expelled from it. Its construction lasted from the sixteenth to the nineteenth century.

== Description ==
The building consists of the following parts:

- Cover: sixteenth century and plateresco style.
- Claustrillo: seventeenth century with Doric archery.
- Refectory: with gothic crossing of aristones and half-point arches. It is decorated with works by Juan Sánchez Cotán.
- Sala de San Pedro y San Pablo or de profundis: it has an altarpiece also painted by Sánchez Cotán.
- Chapel of Legos: built between 1517 and 1519 by Friar Alonso de Ledesma with last Gothic style. Adorned by paintings by Vicente Carducho.
- Chapter hall: with cross vault and Carducho paintings.
- Chapels: there are three in total located in the cloister.
- Church: construction began in the middle of the sixteenth century and ends in 1602. It is divided into three parts, each with a different access.
- Sancta Sactorum or Sagrario.
- Sacristy: began to be built in 1727 and was completed in 1764. Richly ornate, it is worthy exponent of the final phase of Spanish Baroque. In the dome, painted by Tomás Ferrer in 1735, are St. Bruno, San Juan and other founders of the Order of the Carthus.

== See also ==
- 18th-century Western domes
