= Alejandro de Loarte =

Spanish painter (c.1590/1600–1626)

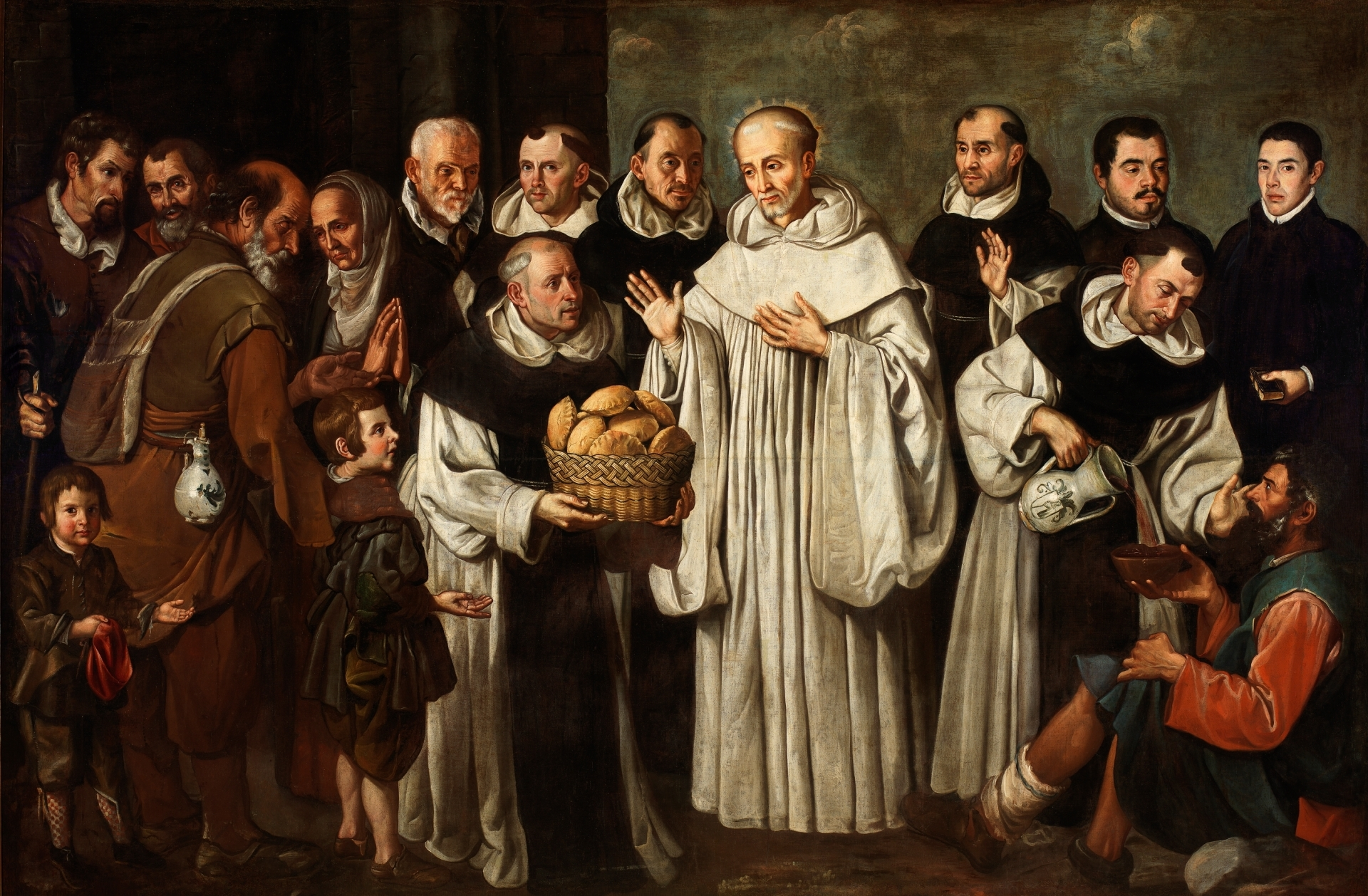
Miracle of Saint Bernard (c. 160)

Alejandro de Loarte (c.1590/1600 – 12 December 1626) was a Spanish painter active during the late Renaissance and early Baroque periods. He specialized in still-lifes.

== Life and work ==
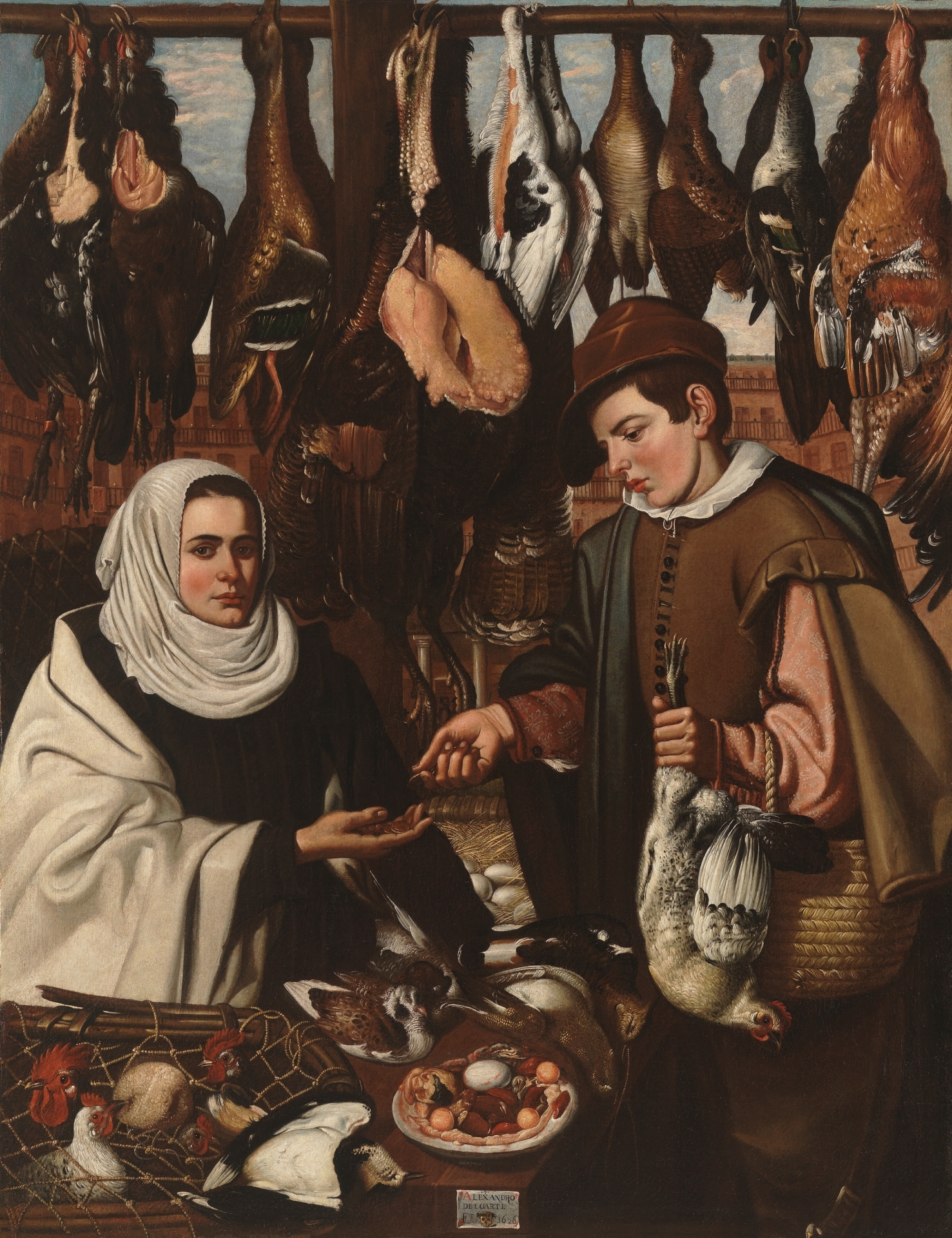
The Poultry Vendor (1626)

There is very little biographical information available and most of the dates in his life are approximations. We do know that his father, a painter named Jerónimo de Loarte, was probably his first teacher and survived him. At his death, he was in charge of a prestigious studio in Madrid and, just before his death in Toledo, named the artist Pedro Orrente as his executor.

His religious paintings varied in quality; some were even copies. His style is closely related to that of Luis Tristán, and the influence of Orrente is obvious. A large canvas of "Saint Bernard with his Monks", in the convent of the Basilica of San Francisco el Grande, once believed to be the work of Francisco Pacheco, has been reattributed to him.

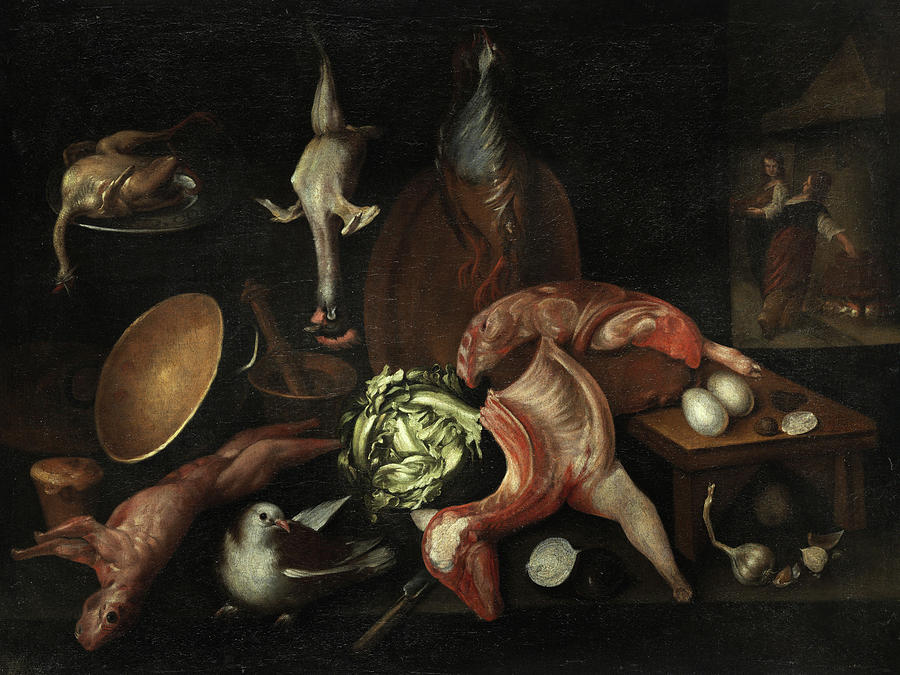
Kitchen Still Life, c. 1626.

Still-lifes form the bulk of his work and he seems to have developed his style from the works of Juan Sánchez Cotán, but with a lighter touch that seems to follow Venetian examples. Many of them also contain human figures; after the style of Bartolomeo Passerotti. Their composition is very symmetrical and somewhat crowded.

== Sources ==
- Bryan, Michael (1889). Walter Armstrong; Robert Edmund Graves (eds.). Dictionary of Painters and Engravers, Biographical and Critical. Vol. II L-Z. London: George Bell and Sons. p. 67.
- Pérez Sánchez, Alonso E., Pintura Barroca en España, 1600-1750. Editorial Cátedra, Madrid ISBN 978-84-376-2684-0
- The Grove Dictionary of Art, MacMillan Publishers (2000)
