= Museo de Bellas Artes de Granada =

Coordinates: 37.1767°N 3.5900°W

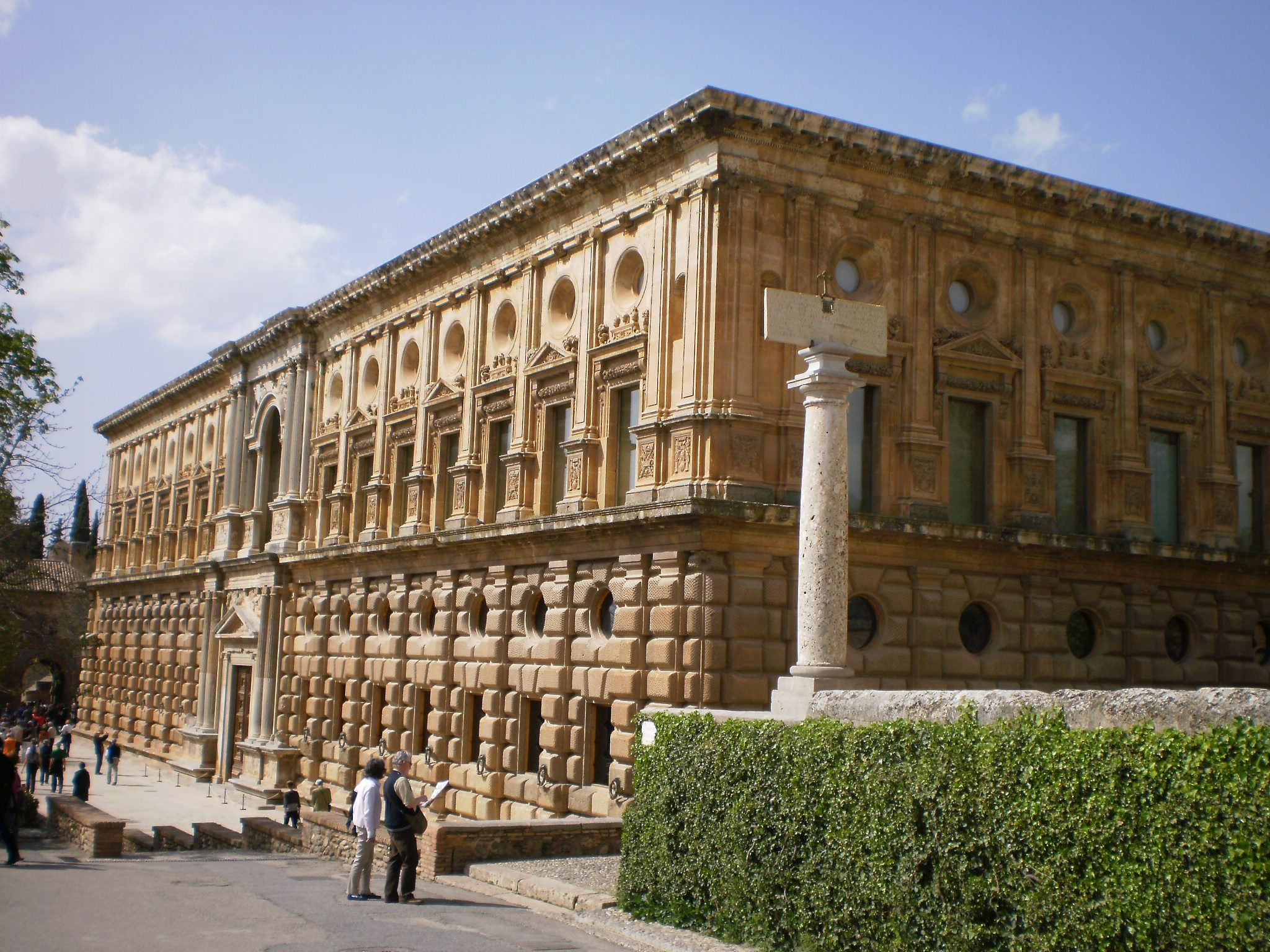
The Palace of Carlos V, home of the museum

The Museo de Bellas Artes de Granada (Museum of Fine Arts of Granada) is a fine arts museum in Granada, Spain. Since the 1950s it has been housed in the Palace of Charles V which also houses the Museo de la Alhambra.

== History ==
In common with many provincial museums in Spain, the Museo de Bellas Artes has its origins in the Spanish confiscation of the 19th century when art works were expropriated from monasteries.

== Collections ==
It houses one famous Still life by Juan Sánchez Cotán, a display of paintings by Alonso Cano, Juan de Sevilla and Mariano Fortuny, wood sculptures by Jacopo Torni and Pedro de Mena, and more objects of religious art, such as the “Allegory of Death” by P. Toma, a 17th-century, oil on canvas and “St. Francis of Assisi” an anonymous 17th century oil on canvas.
