= Juan Sánchez Cotán =

Spanish artist (1560–1627)

- Born: June 25, 1560; Orgaz, near Toledo.
- Died: September 8, 1627 (aged 67); Granada, Spain
- Known for: Bodegónes, Religious paintings
- Movement: Spanish Baroque

Juan Sánchez Cotán (June 25, 1560 – September 8, 1627) was a Spanish Baroque painter, a pioneer of realism in Spain. His still lifes and bodegones were painted in an austere style, especially when compared to similar works in the Netherlands and Italy.

== Life ==
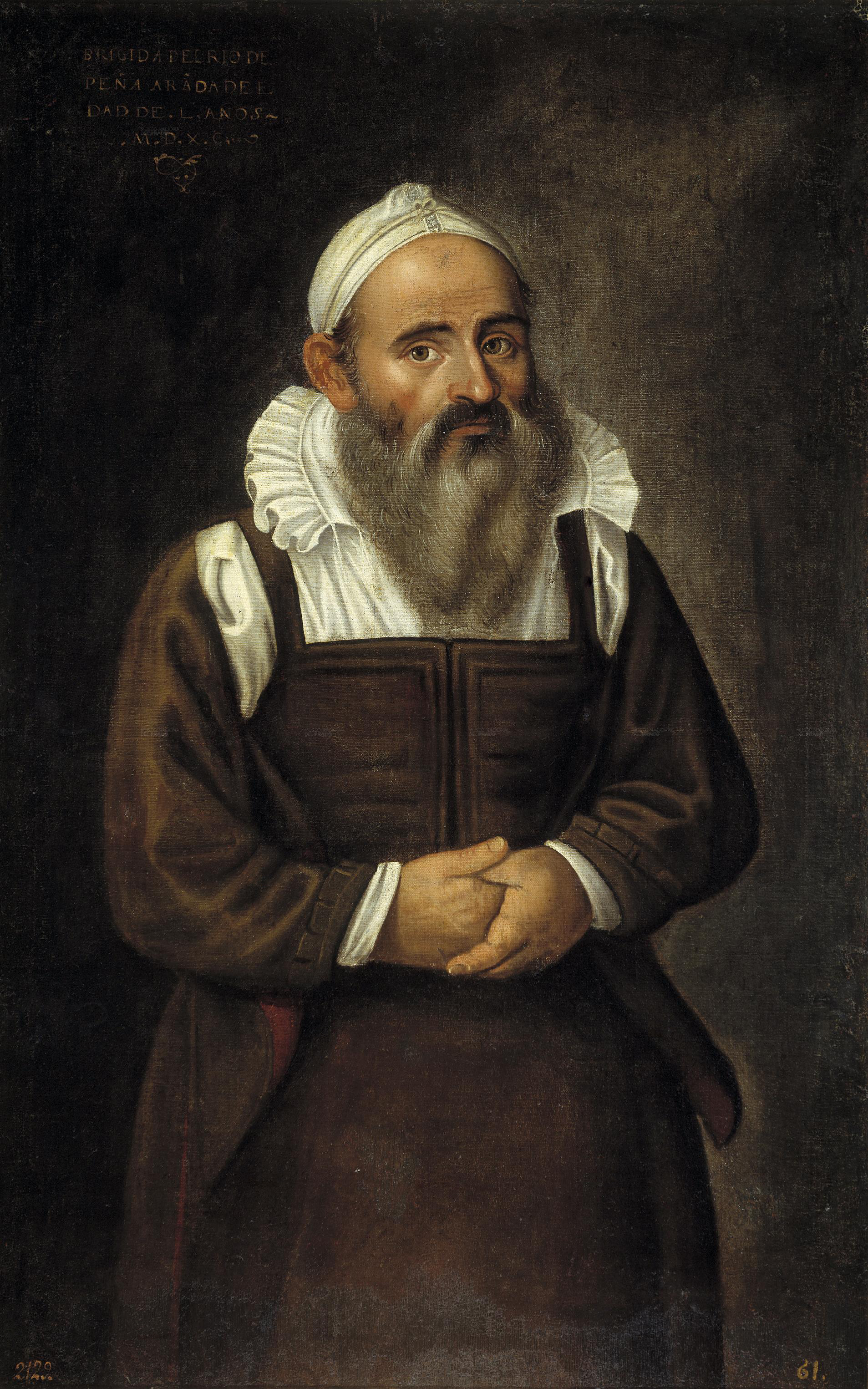
Brígida del Río, the Bearded Lady of Peñaranda; 1590, 102 × 61 cm, Prado Museum.

Sánchez Cotán was born in the town of Orgaz, near Toledo, Spain. He was a friend and perhaps pupil of Blas de Prado, an artist famous for his still lifes whose mannerist style with touches of realism the disciple developed further. Cotán began by painting altarpieces and religious works. For approximately twenty years, patronized by the city's aristocracy, he pursued a successful career as an artist in Toledo painting religious scenes, portraits and still lifes. These paintings found a receptive audience among the educated intellectuals of Toledo society. Sánchez Cotán executed his notable still lifes around the beginning of the seventeenth century, before the end of his secular life.

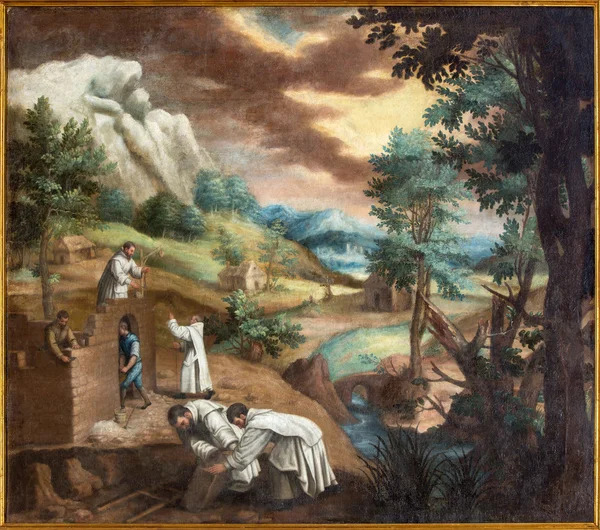
Sánchez Cotán painted several Catholic works for the Carthusians, like The Carthusians Building the First Monastery of Santa Maria de las Cuevas; after 1603, Granada Charterhouse.

On August 10, 1603, Sánchez Cotán, then in his forties, closed up his workshop at Toledo to renounce the world and enter the Carthusian monastery Santa Maria de El Paular. He continued his career painting religious works with singular mysticism. In 1612 he was sent to the Granada Charterhouse; he decided to become a monk, and in the following year he entered the Carthusian monastery at Granada as a lay brother. The reasons for this are not clear, though such action was not unusual then.

Cotán was a prolific religious painter whose work, carried out exclusively for his monastery, reached its peak about 1617 in the cycle of eight great narrative paintings that he painted for the cloister of the Granada Monastery. These depict the foundation of the order of St. Bruno, and the prosecution of the monks in England by the Protestants. Although the painter's religious works have an archaic air, they also reveal a keen interest in the treatment of light and volume, and in some respects are comparable with certain works by the Italian Luca Cambiaso, whom Cotán knew at the Escorial.

In spite of his retreat from the world, Cotán's influence remained strong. His concern with the relationships among objects and with achieving the illusion of reality through the use of light and shadow was a major influence on the work of later Spanish painters such as Juan van der Hamen, Felipe Ramírez, the brothers Vincenzo and Bartolomeo Carducci and, notably, Francisco de Zurbarán. Sánchez Cotán ended his days universally loved and regarded as a saint. He died in 1627 in Granada.

== Style ==
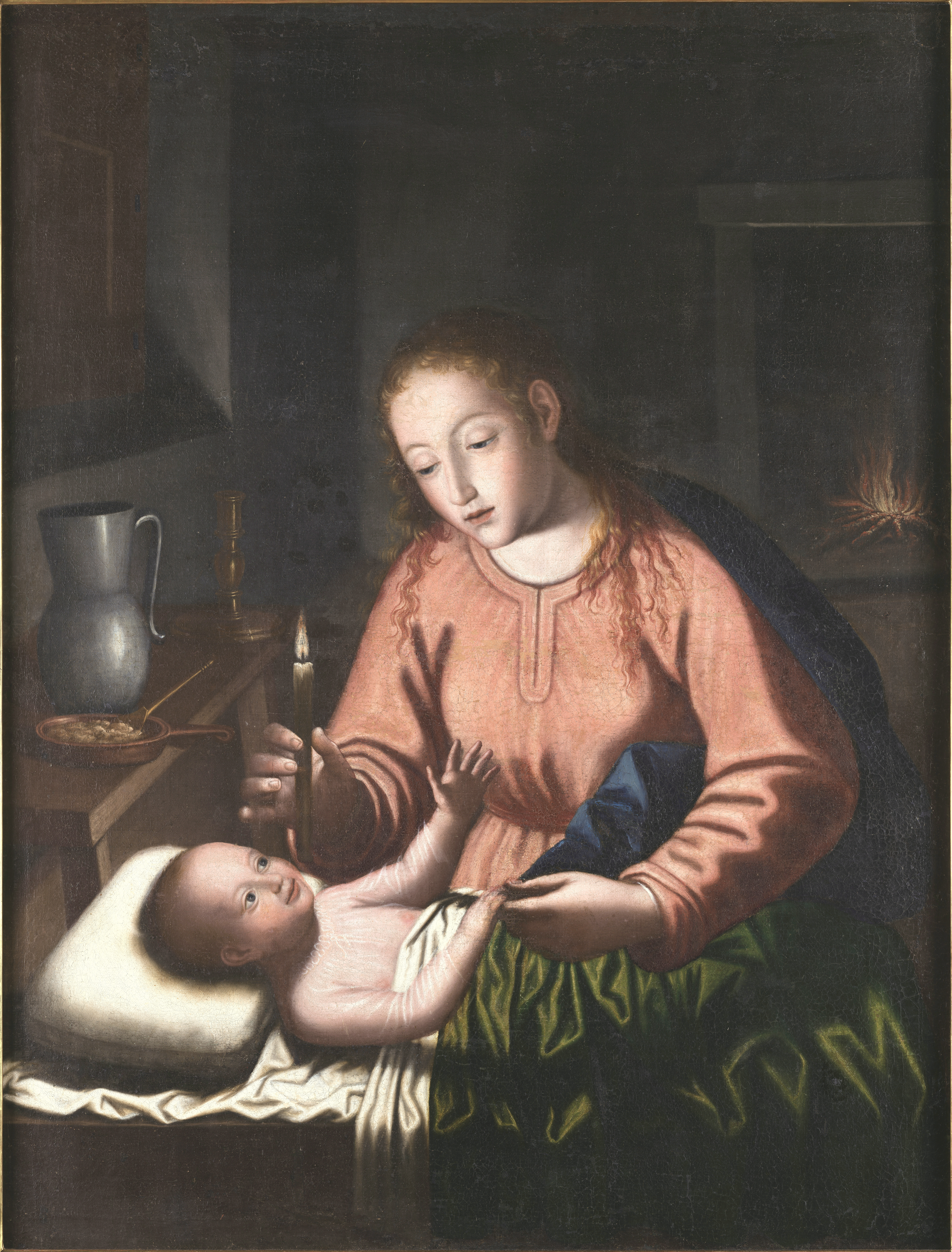
Sánchez Cotán utilized motifs of Tenebrism in several of his religious works, such as The Virgin Waking the Child; 1603–27, 110 × 84 cm, Museo de Bellas Artes de Granada.

Sánchez Cotán stylistically falls within the school of El Escorial, with Venetian influence, and his works can be placed in the transition from Mannerism to Baroque. He was an early pioneer of Tenebrism at the beginning of the golden age of Spanish painting. Although his religious paintings have a primitive sensitivity and a peaceful rhythm, Cotán's high stature in art history rests exclusively on his still lifes, of which only a few are extant. Their severe naturalism has little in common with the artistic style then prevalent.

== Still lifes ==
Sánchez Cotán established the prototype of the Spanish still life depicting pantry items, called a bodegón, composed mainly of vegetables. Characteristically, he depicts a few simple fruits or vegetables, some of which hang from a fine string at different levels while others sit on a ledge or window. The forms stand out with an almost geometric clarity against a dark background. This orchestration of still life in direct sunlight against impenetrable darkness is the hallmark of early Spanish still life painting. Each form is scrutinized with such intensity that the pictures take on a mystical quality, and the reality of things is intensified to a degree that no other seventeenth-century painter would surpass.

Norman Bryson describes Sánchez Cotán's spare representations as abstemious images and links his work to his later monastic life. They are supposed to express a monastic denial of worldly pleasure and richness: "Absent from Cotán's work is any conception of nourishment as involving the conviviality of the meal .... What replaces their interest as sustenance is their interest as mathematical form." His fruits and vegetables are arranged in beautiful ballet like compositions. The Carthusians are vegetarian, but many of his works contain game birds.

He depicted few artifacts other than the strings from which vegetables and fruits dangle, this being the common means in the seventeenth century of preventing food and vegetables from rotting. Even if the objects are arranged so that they seem close enough to touch, they are nevertheless distanced. For all the realism with which they are depicted, the isolation of each object, heightened further by the black background, lends them a monumental, almost sculptural gravity.

Sánchez Cotán is documented to have painted at least nine still life paintings. Seven of them are recognized, of which four are in museums and three in private collections; whereabouts of the other two remain unknown, and it is not known if they have survived.

All seven known still lifes of Sánchez Cotán

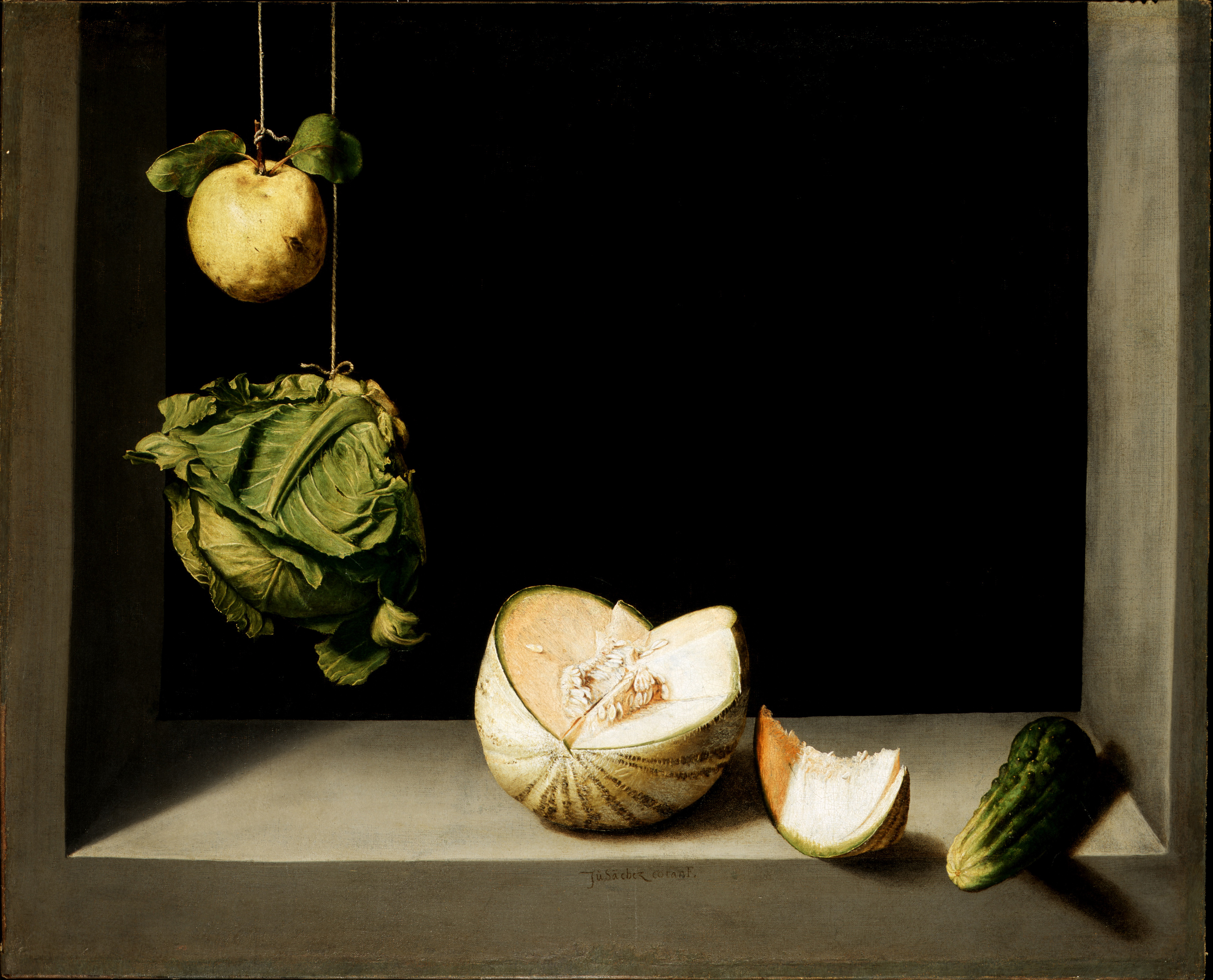
Still Life with Quince, Cabbage, Melon, and Cucumber, c. 1602, 69 × 84 cm, San Diego Museum of Art.

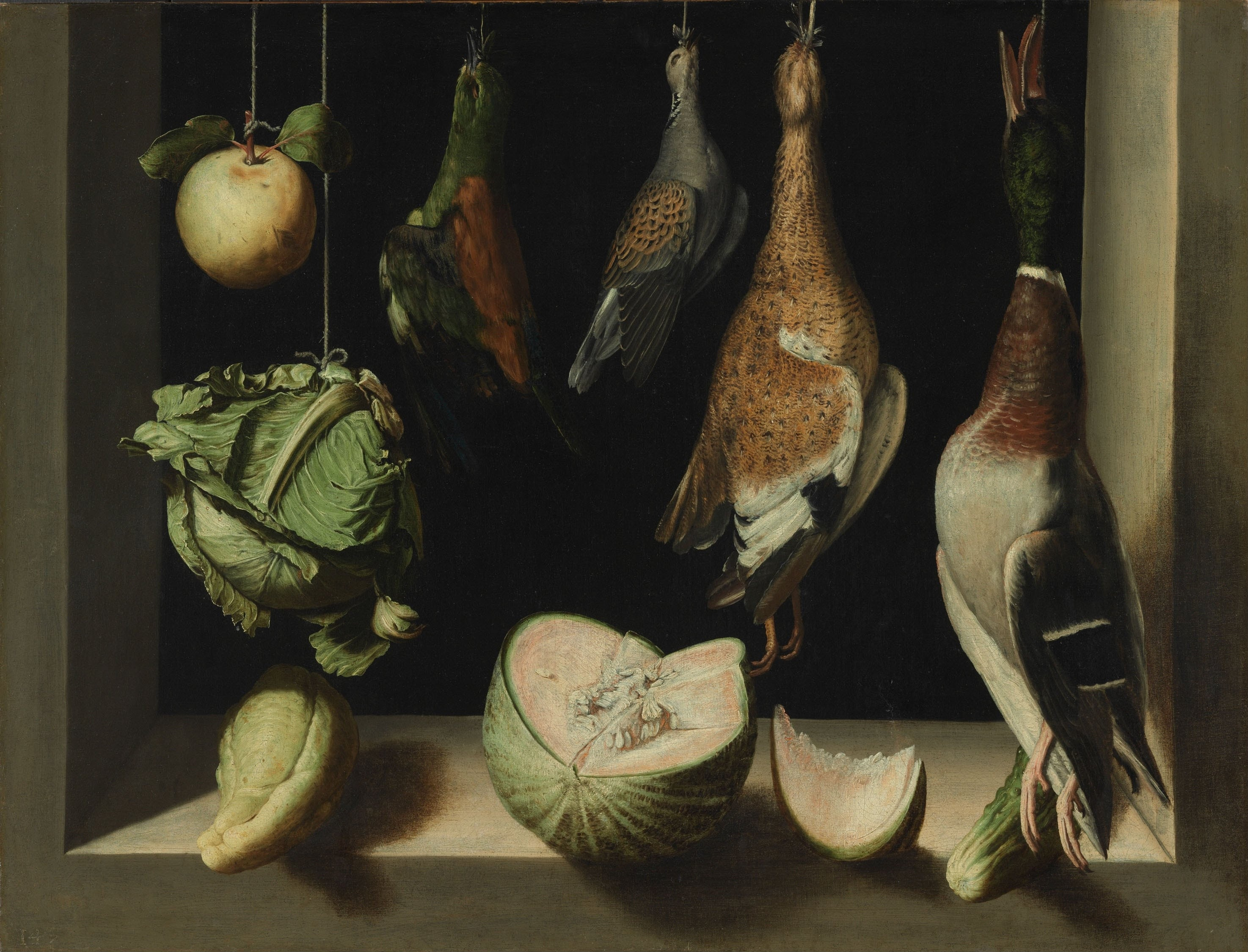
Still Life with Game Fowl, 1600–03, 68 × 88 cm, Art Institute of Chicago

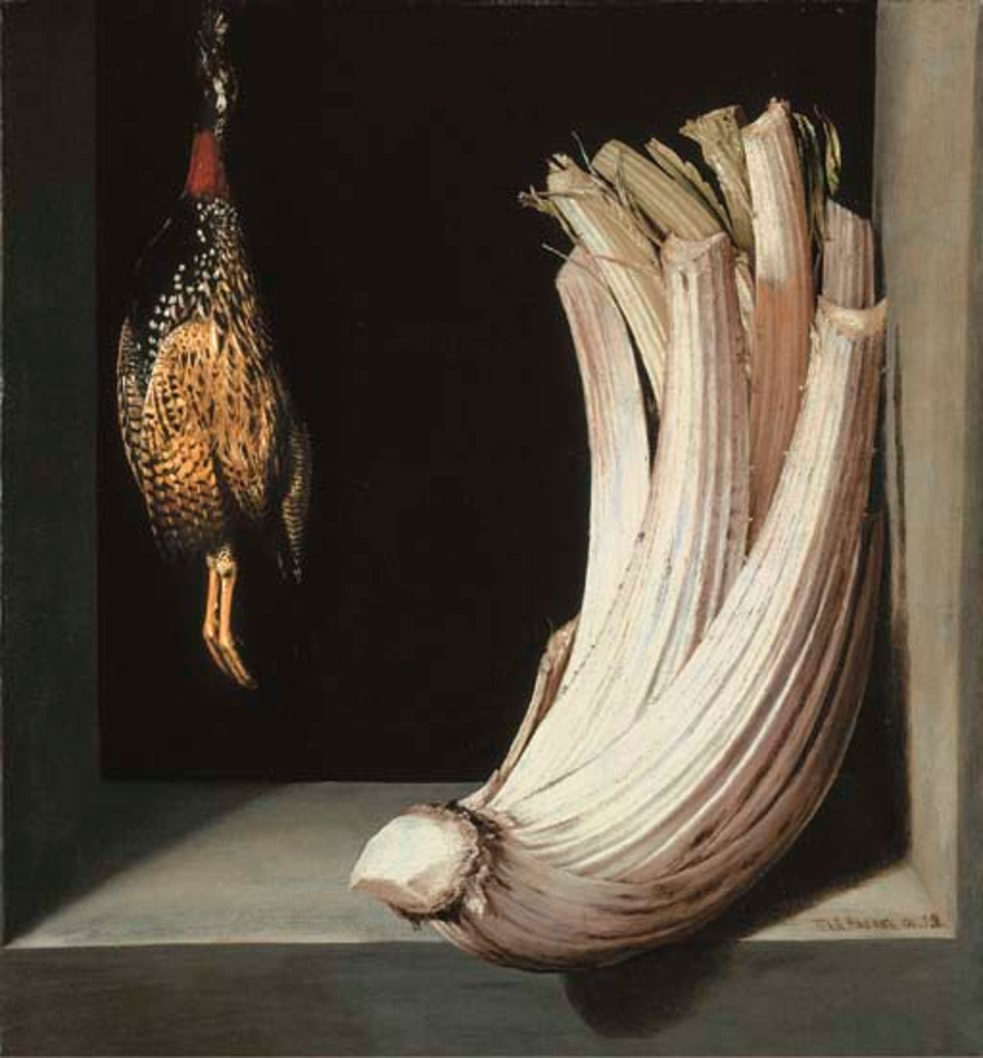
Still life with Cardoon and Francolin, c. 1603, 73 × 62 cm, Piasecka-Johnson Collection, Princeton, New Jersey.

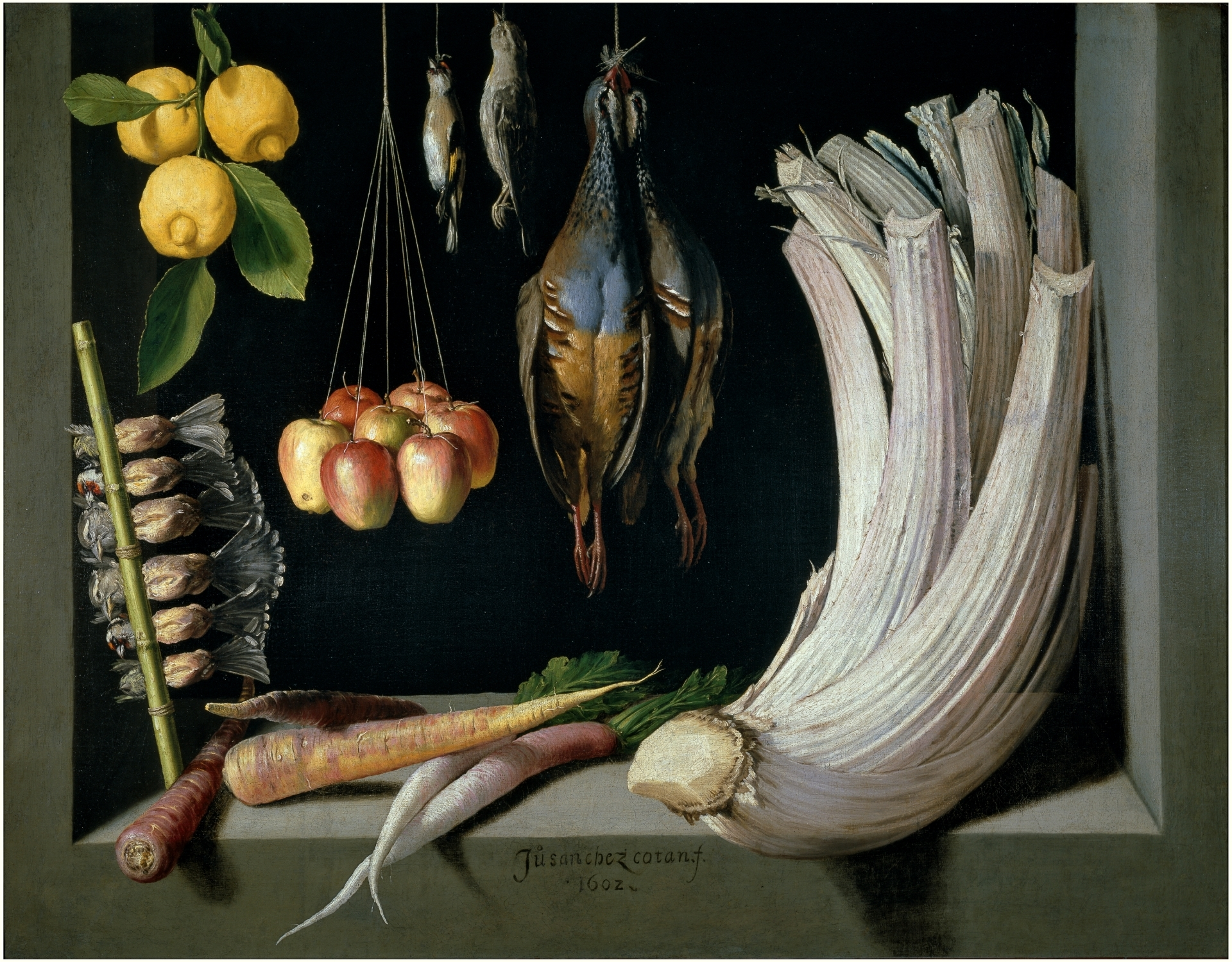
Still Life with Game, Vegetables and Fruit, 1602, 68 × 88 cm, Prado Museum.

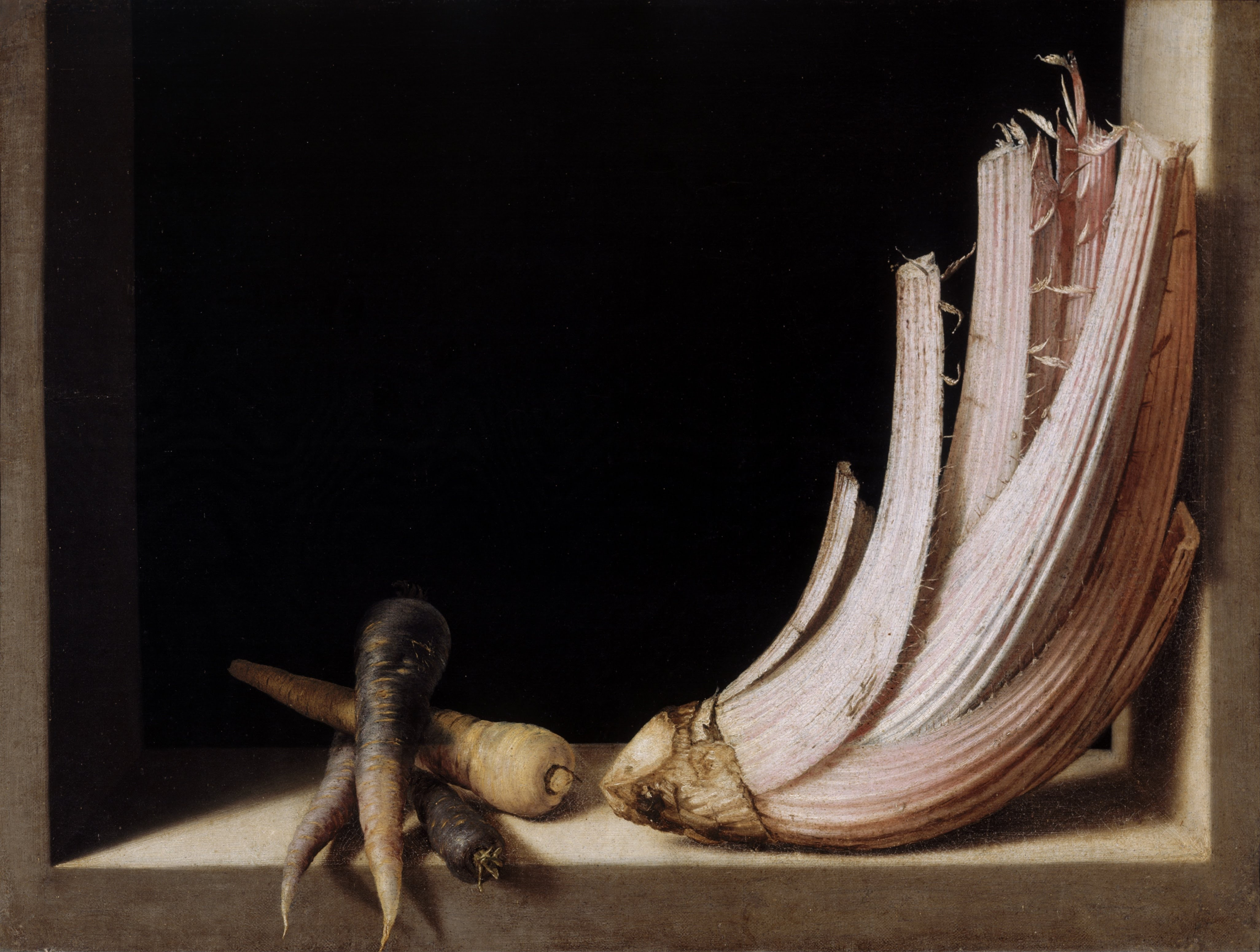
Still Life with Thistle and Carrots, c. 1603, 62 × 82 cm, Museo de Bellas Artes de Granada

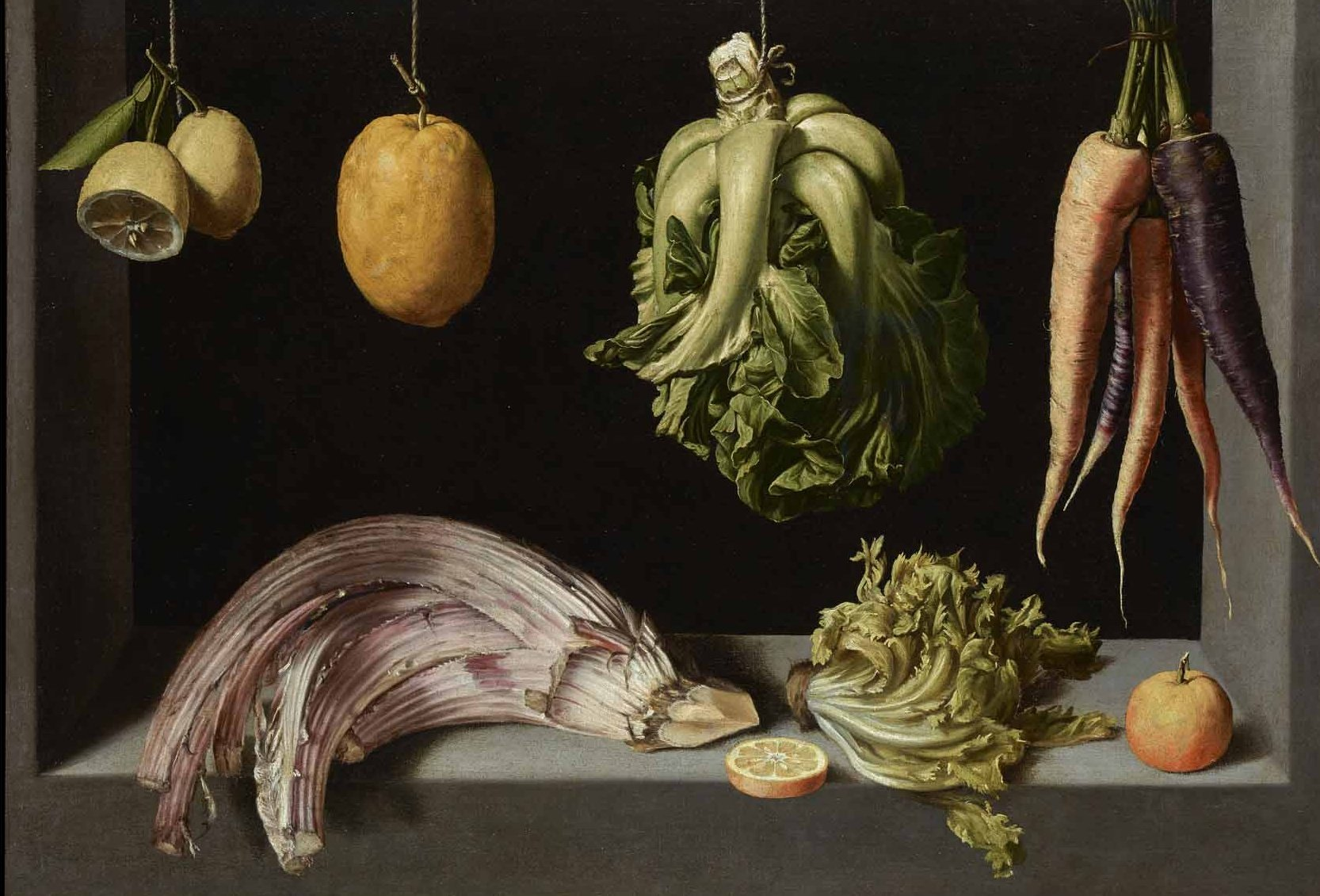
Still Life with Fruits and Vegetables, c. 1602, 69 × 96 cm, Colección de Banco Inversión, Madrid.

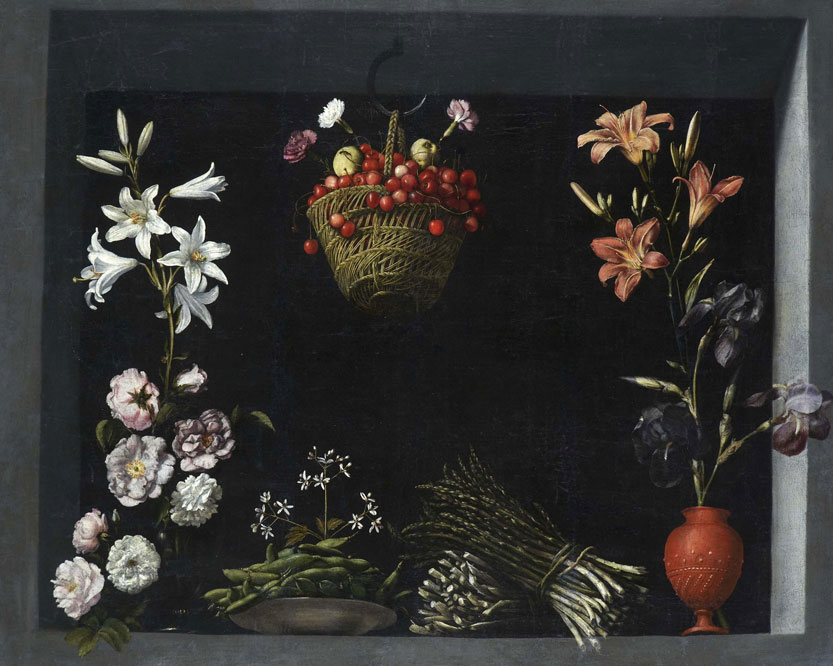
Still Life with Flowers, Vegetables and a Basket of Cherries, c. 1600, 89 × 109 cm, private collection of David David-Weill's family.

== Gallery ==
Sánchez Cotán depicted most of the major events in the life of Mary and Jesus

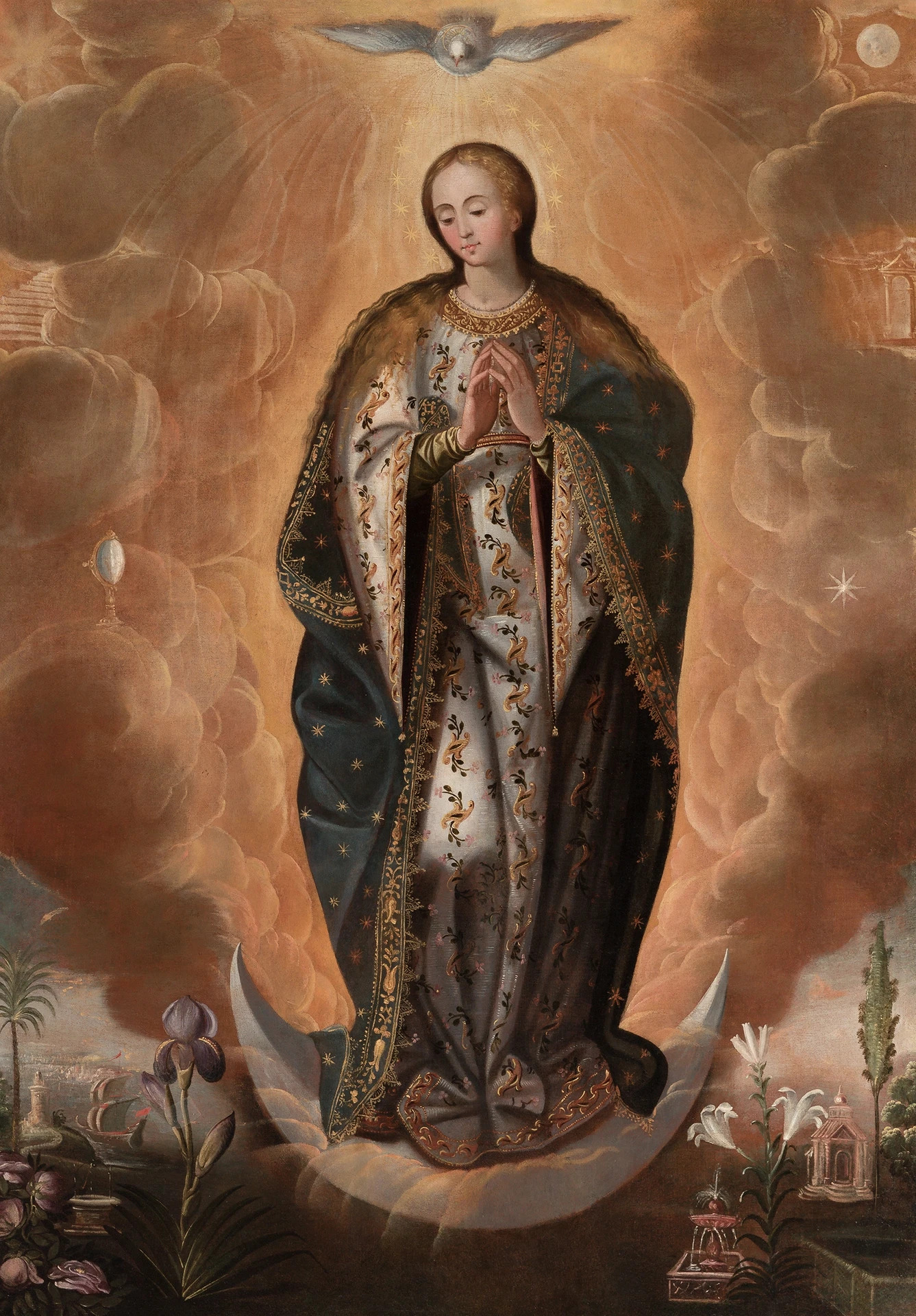
Immaculate; after 1603, 145,5 × 104 cm, private collection.

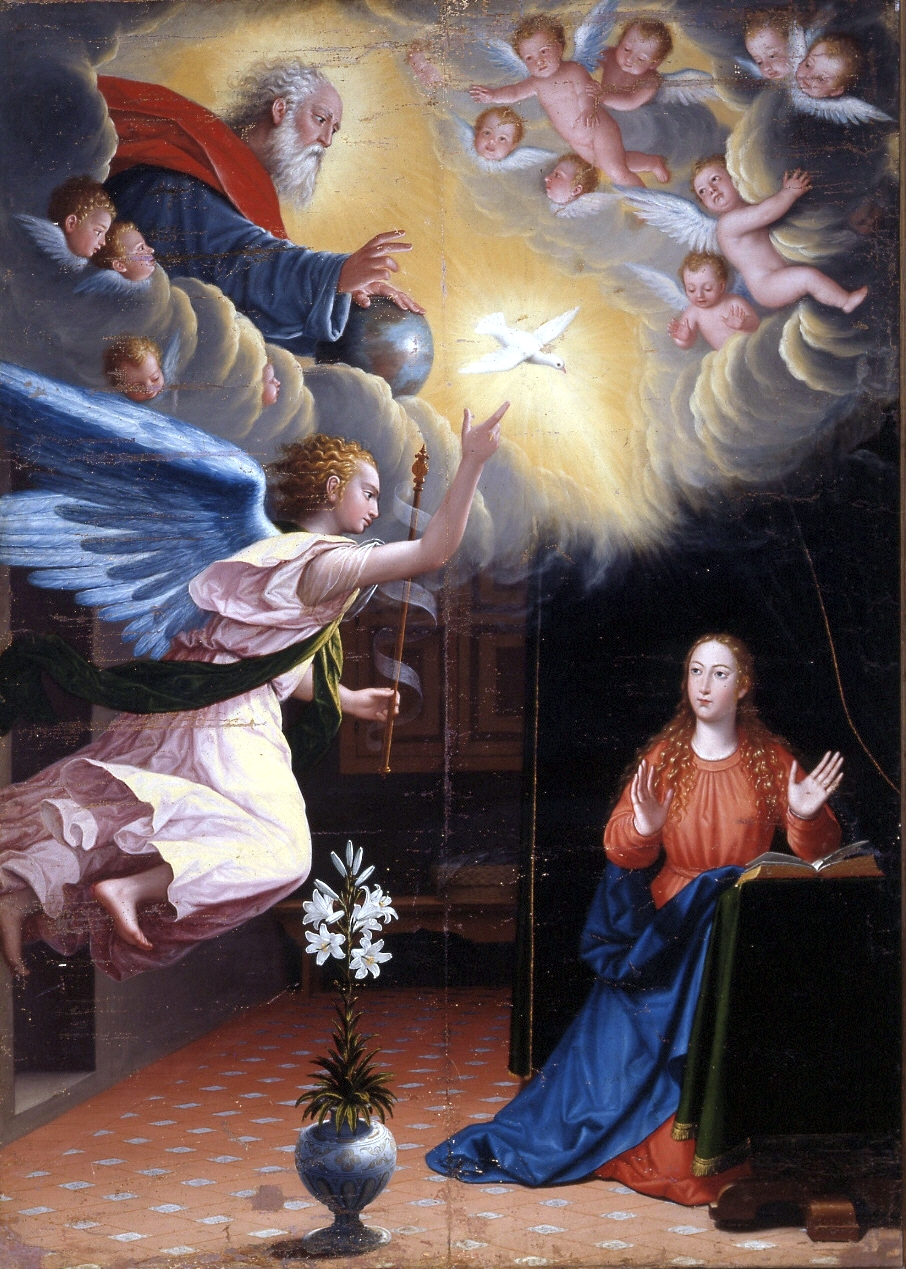
Annunciation; 1603–27, 292 × 209 cm, Museo de Bellas Artes de Granada.

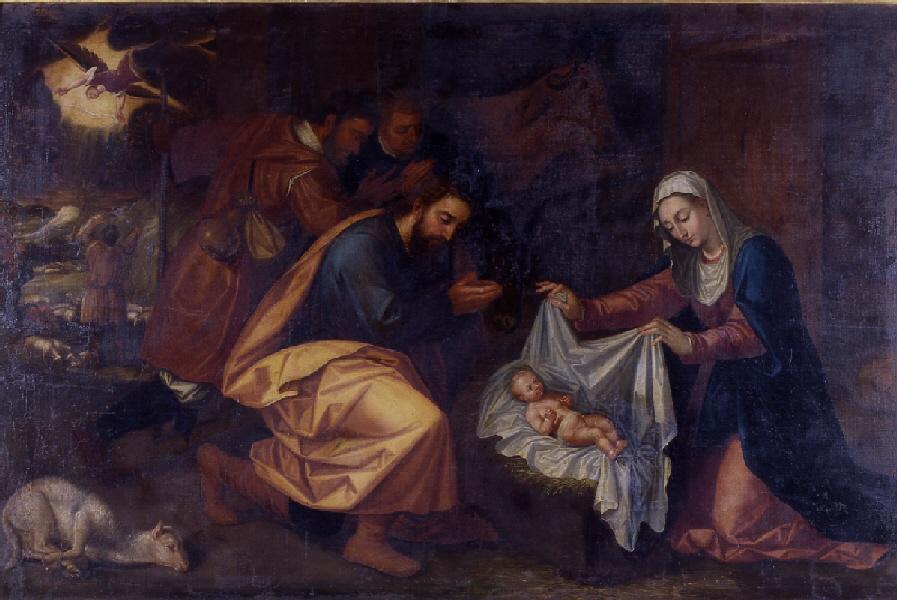
Adoration of the Shepherds; 1603–05, 157 × 245 cm, Museo de Bellas Artes de Granada.

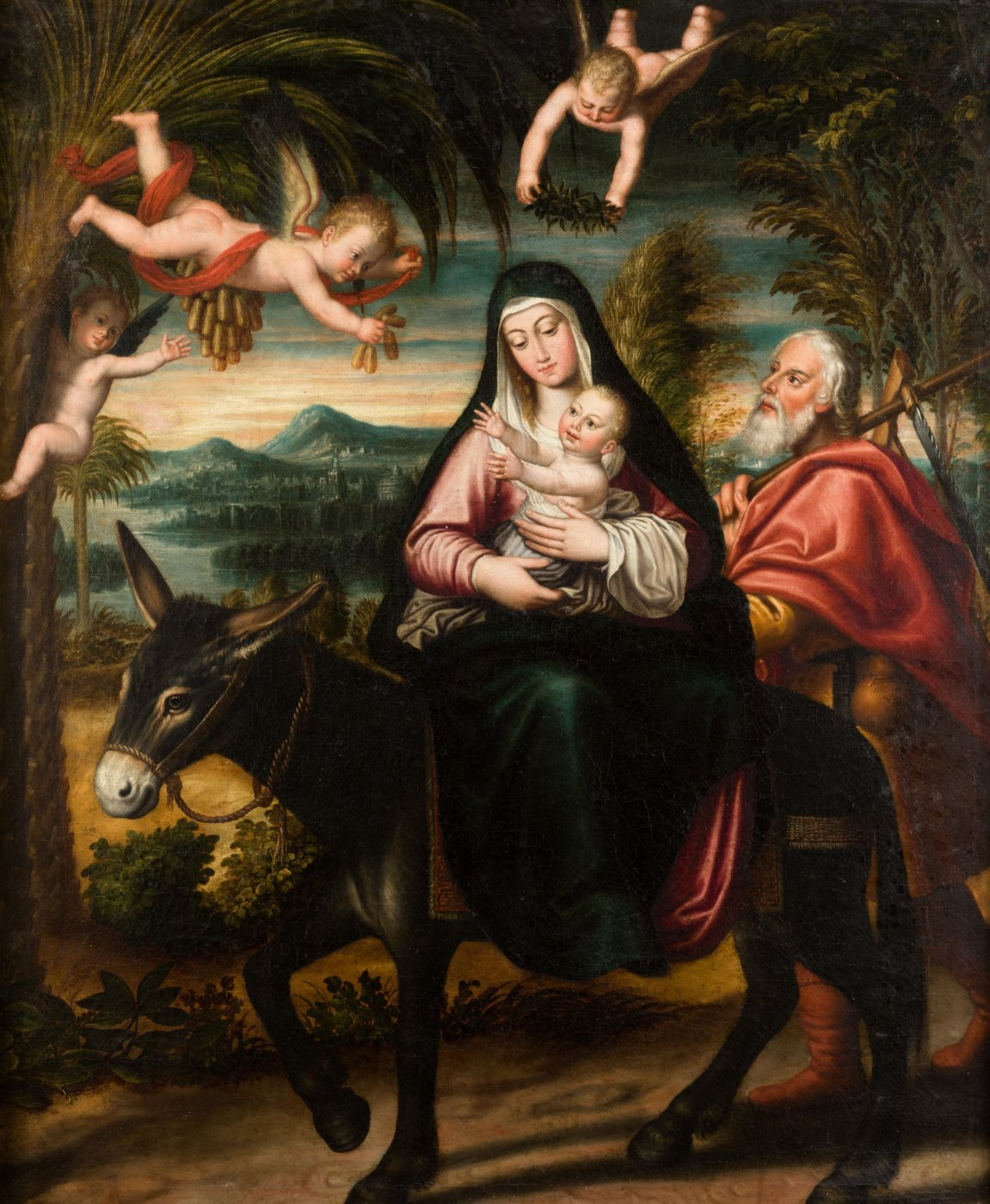
Flight into Egypt; 127 × 107 cm, 1600–27, private collection.

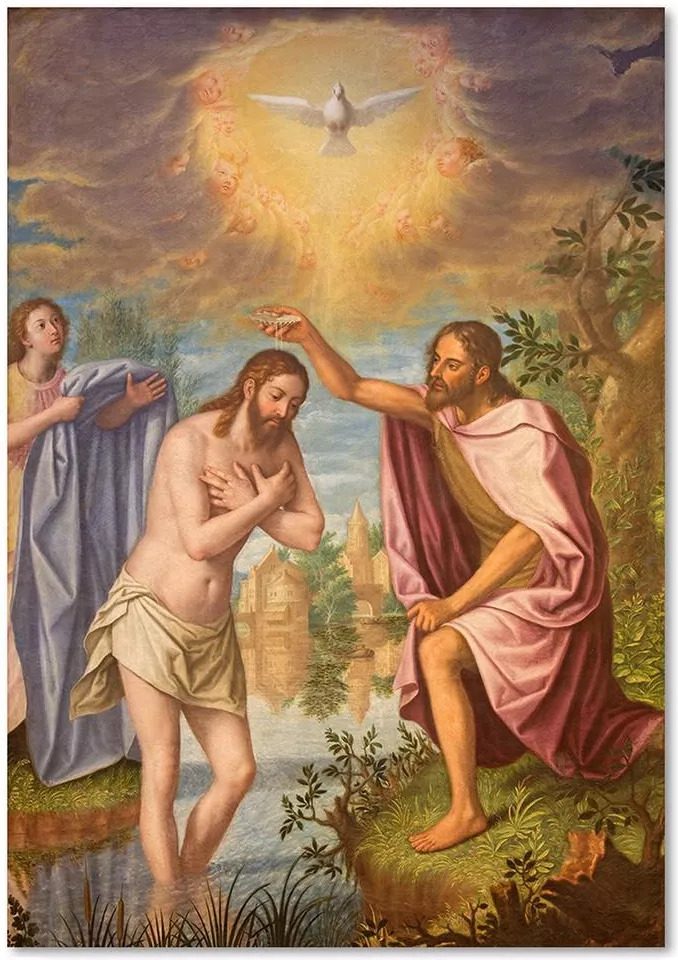
Baptism of Christ; 1600–27, Granada Charterhouse.

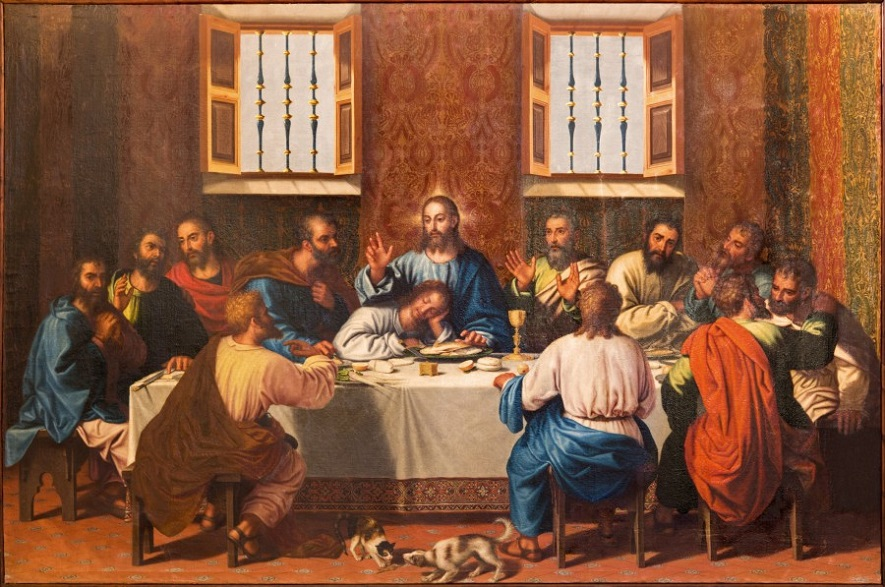
The Lord's Supper with the Apostles; 1618, 335 × 509 cm, Museo de Bellas Artes de Granada.

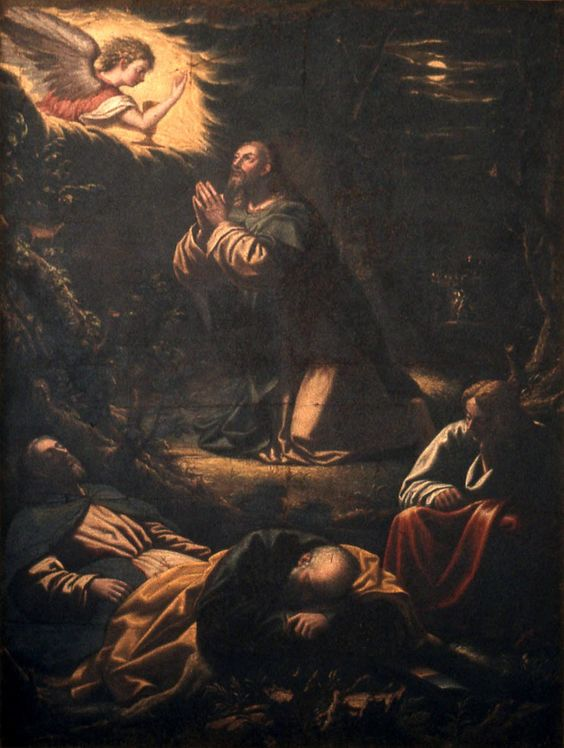
Prayer in the Garden; 1626–27, 283 × 201 cm, Museo de Bellas Artes de Granada.

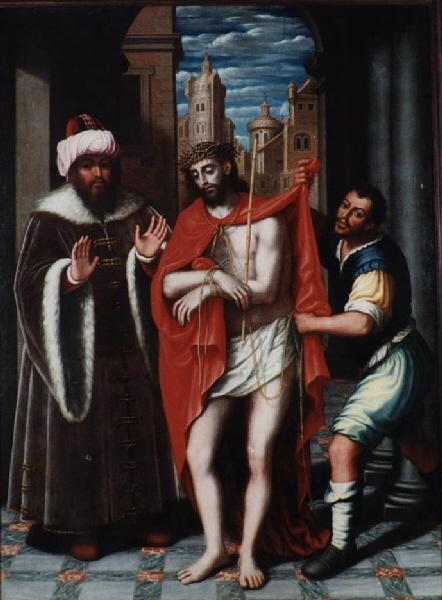
Ecce Homo; 1626–27, 278 × 200 cm, Museo de Bellas Artes de Granada.

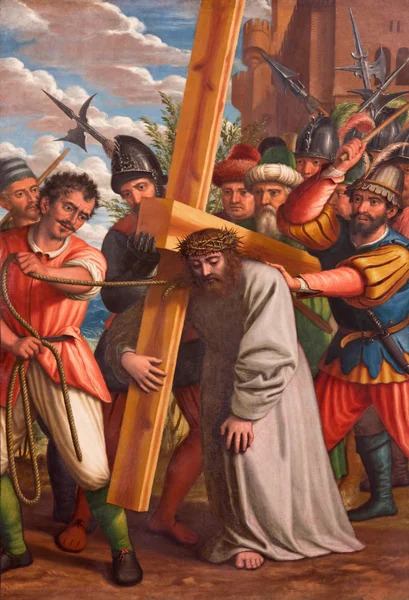
Christ Carrying the Cross; after 1603, Granada Charterhouse.

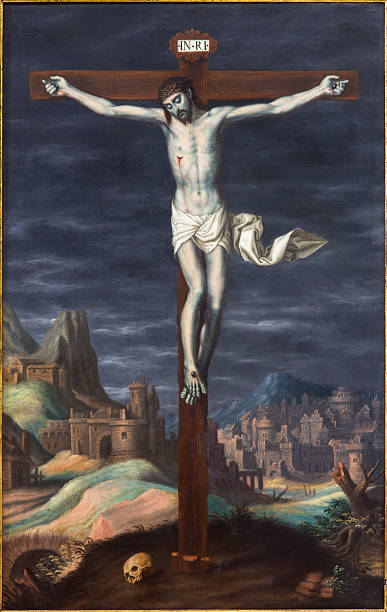
Crucifixion of Jesus; after 1603, Granada Charterhouse.

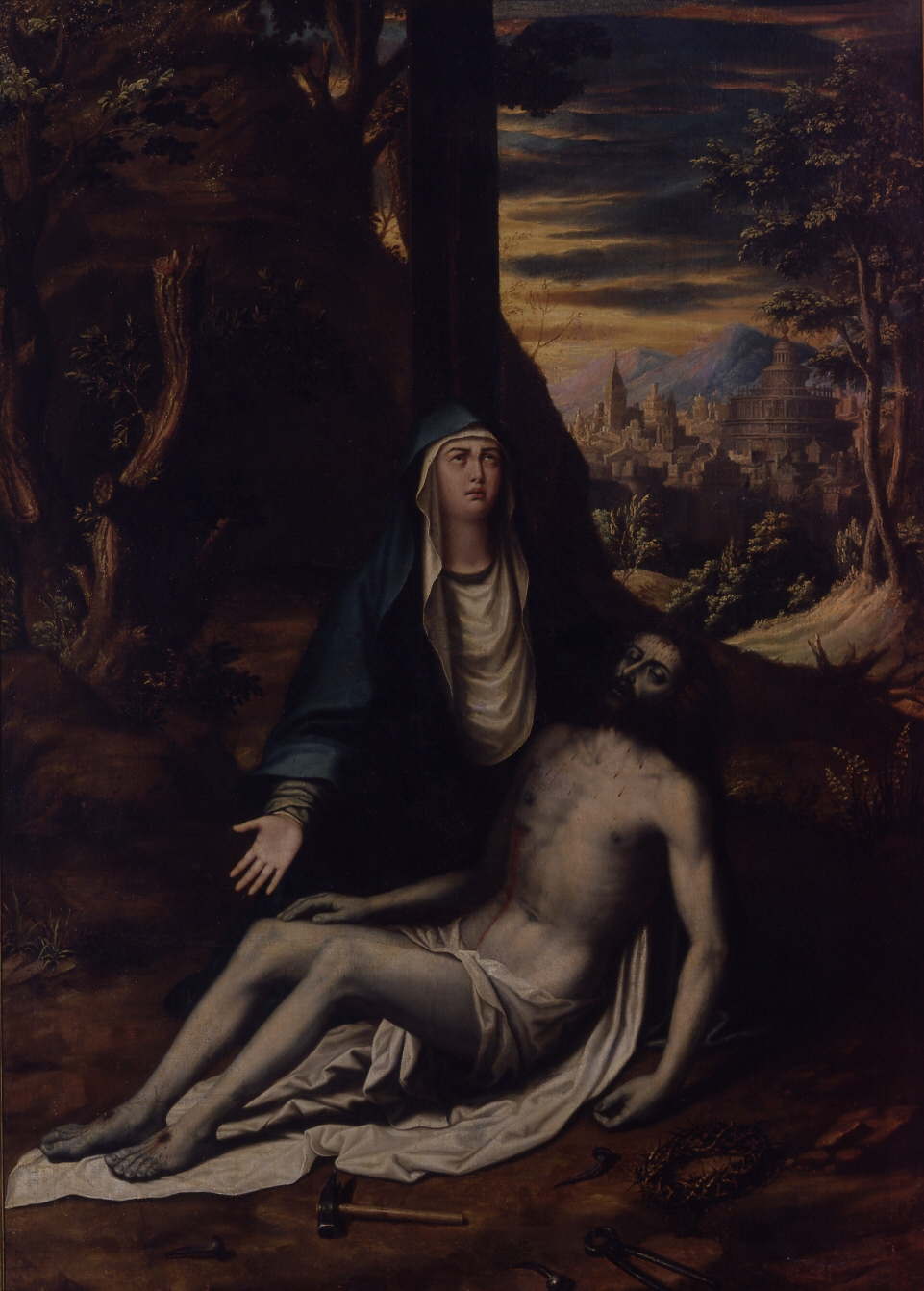
Virgin of Sorrows; 1626–27, 279 × 199 cm, Museo de Bellas Artes de Granada.

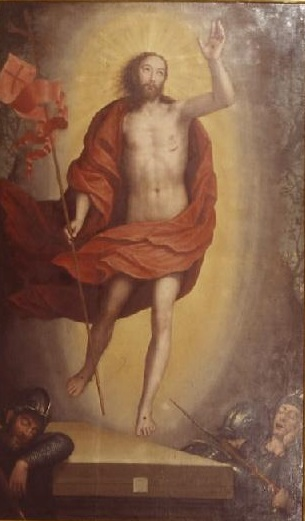
Resurrection of the Lord; 1618–27, 253 × 152 cm, Museo de Bellas Artes de Granada.

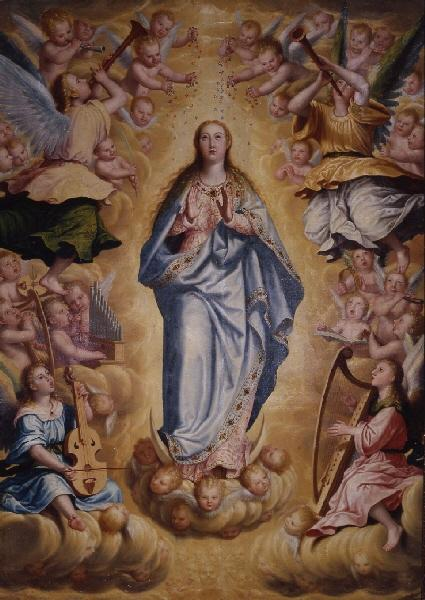
Assumption; 1603–27, 256 × 183 cm, Museo de Bellas Artes de Granada.

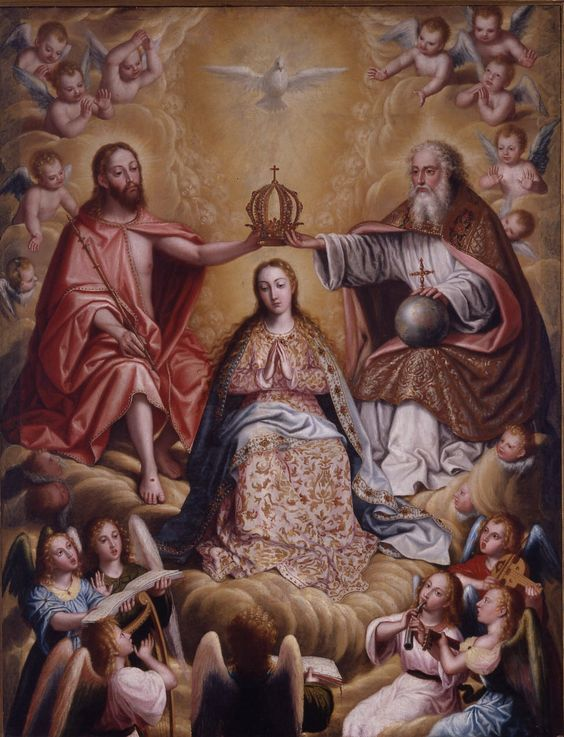
Coronation of the Virgin; 1603–27, 256 × 198 cm, Museo de Bellas Artes de Granada.
