= Tomás Yepes =

Spanish painter (1595–1674)

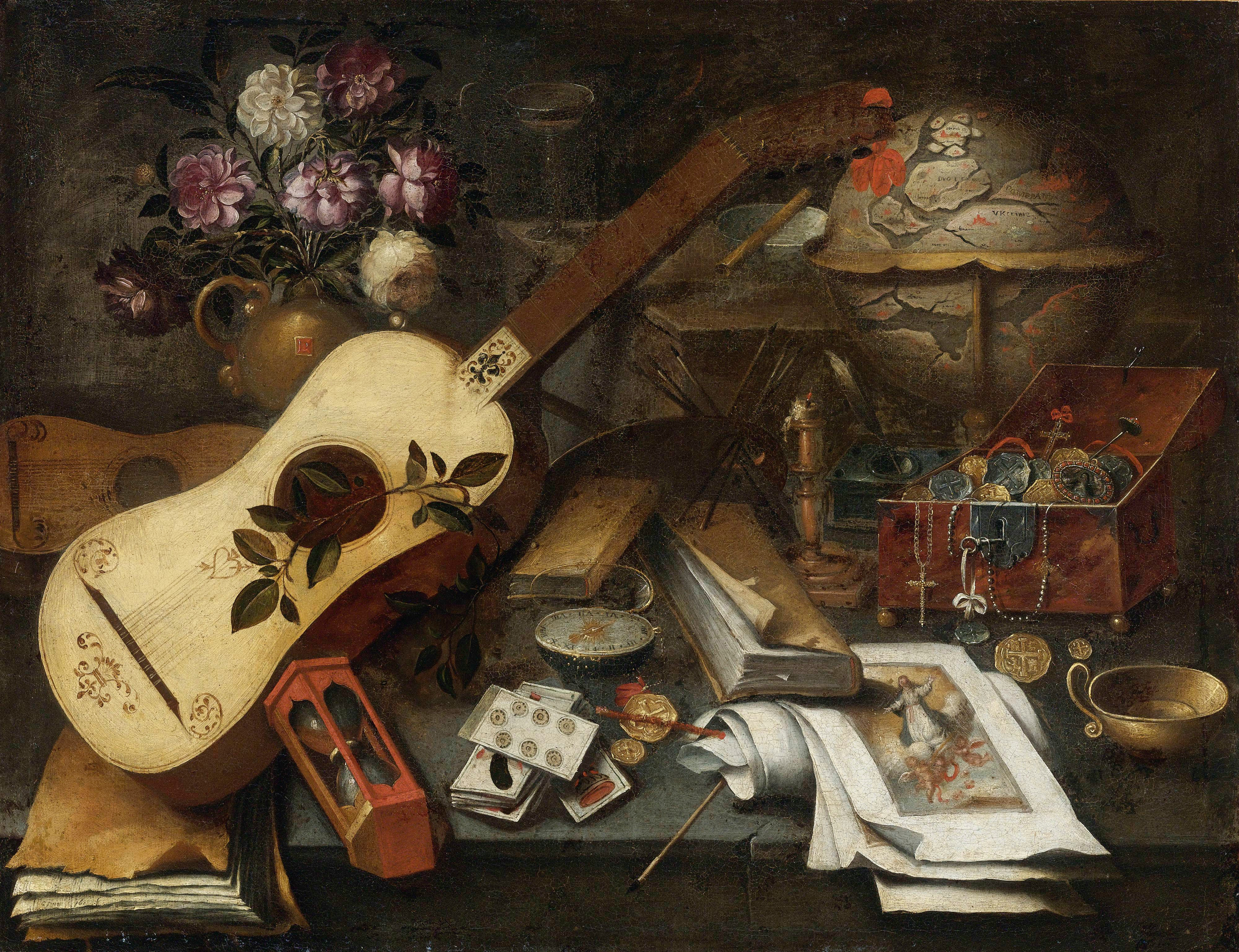
- Still Life with a Guitar by Yepes, c. 1650
- Born: 1595 or 1600; Kingdom of Valencia
- Died: 16 June 1674 (aged 78–79 or 73–74); Valencia, Spain
- Resting place: St. Stephen's Church, Valencia
- Movement: Bodegón; Spanish Baroque

Tomás de Yepes or Hiepes (also known as Thomas de Yepes or Hiepes; 1595 or 1600 – 16 June 1674) was a Spanish Baroque painter in the Kingdom of Valencia. He worked as a painter of still life and bodegón—still life paintings depicting pantry items. He made paintings both for clients and public events. Although his activity started in the second decade of the 17th century, most of the works attributed to him come after 1642. He continued to paint until the year of his death.

Yepes's depictions of flower vases, fruits (particularly grapes), and everyday objects were prominent in the region during the 17th and 18th century, and he has been regarded as one of the major rediscoveries of art history. He is best known for his distinctive style of flower painting that he focused on throughout his career. His paintings are exhibited in museums and in private collections worldwide, with Museo del Prado hosting the most extensive collection of his works.

== Life ==
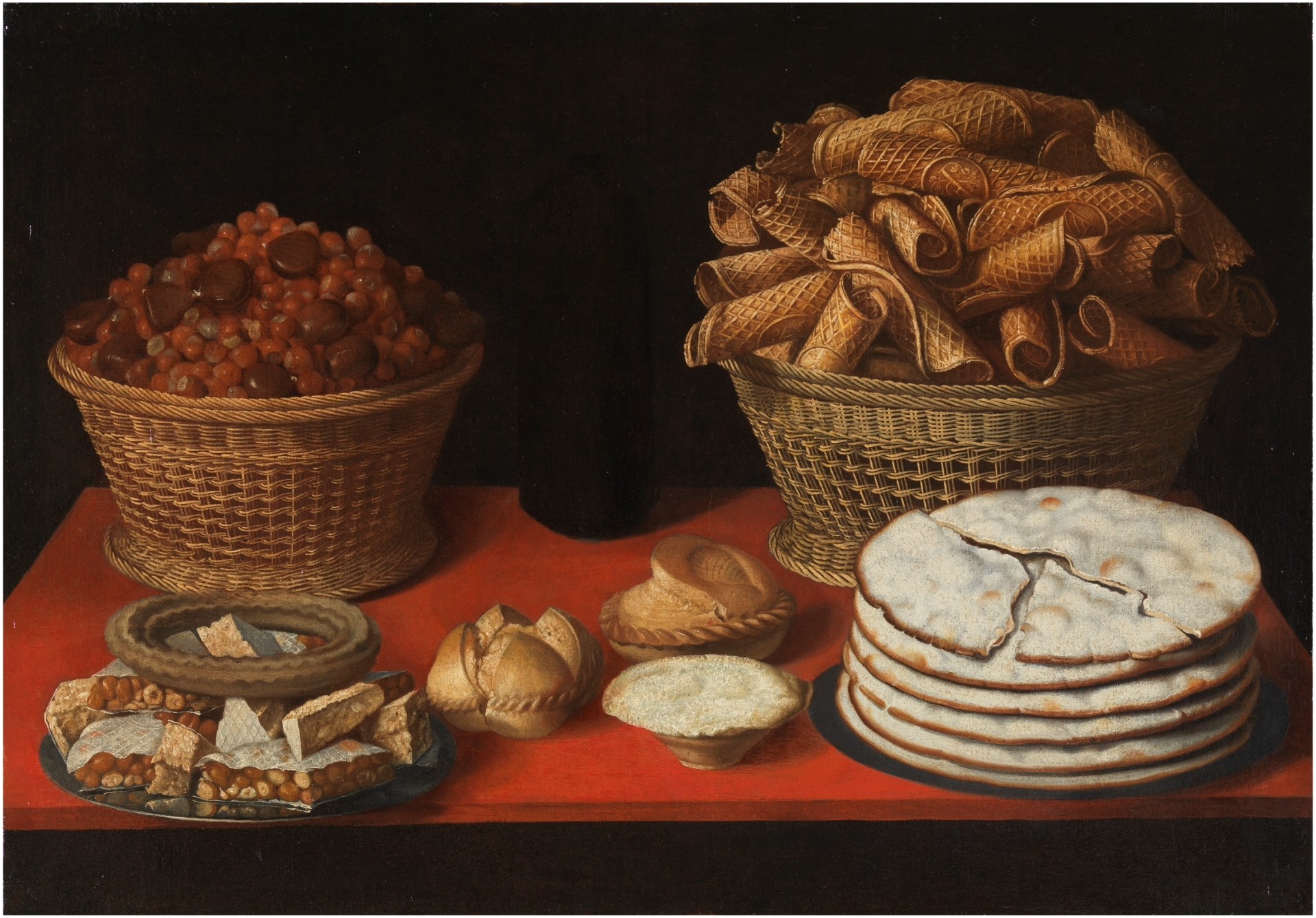
Sweets and Nuts on a Table (1600–35); many of Yepes's early paintings feature sweets and desserts, likely from Vicenta's confectionery

Yepes was born to Pascual Tomás Yepes and Vicenta Pujades or Puchades in 1595 or 1600. (Note: Some sources mention 1595, while others mention 1600. His birth year was also suggested to be 1610. However, William B. Jordan in his 1997 book notes that "in October of 1616, the young Tomás Hiepes was admitted to the Colegio de Pintores in Valencia, an indication that his birth must have been around 1600, or probably even a few years before, instead of around 1610, as previously supposed.") Although art historians have been unable to ascertain whether he was born in the city of Valencia—where he was active during his career—he is considered to have been born in the Kingdom of Valencia.

Not much is known about Yepes's life outside of his paintings. He enrolled at the Colegio de Pintores de Valencia (College of Painters of Valencia) in October 1616. By 1630, he was in a commercial deal with Medina del Campo and his paintings were sold at the town's various fairs. Yepes had an elder sister, Vicenta, who owned a confectionery. In 1631, she filed a lawsuit against Yepes demanding payment of old debts, which her brother settled with delivery of a few religious paintings.

Yepes was married to Ana Eres or Heres, a scion of a wealthy Valencian family; her family also owned properties that were rented out in Algemesí. After the death of her brothers, Eres declared herself to be the sole heiress of the family on 4 July 1635. Yepes's father-in-law Gaspar Eres worked as a carpenter at the fairs; Yepes and Gaspar Eres collectively received 220 Valencian pounds from Medina del Campo in 1635.

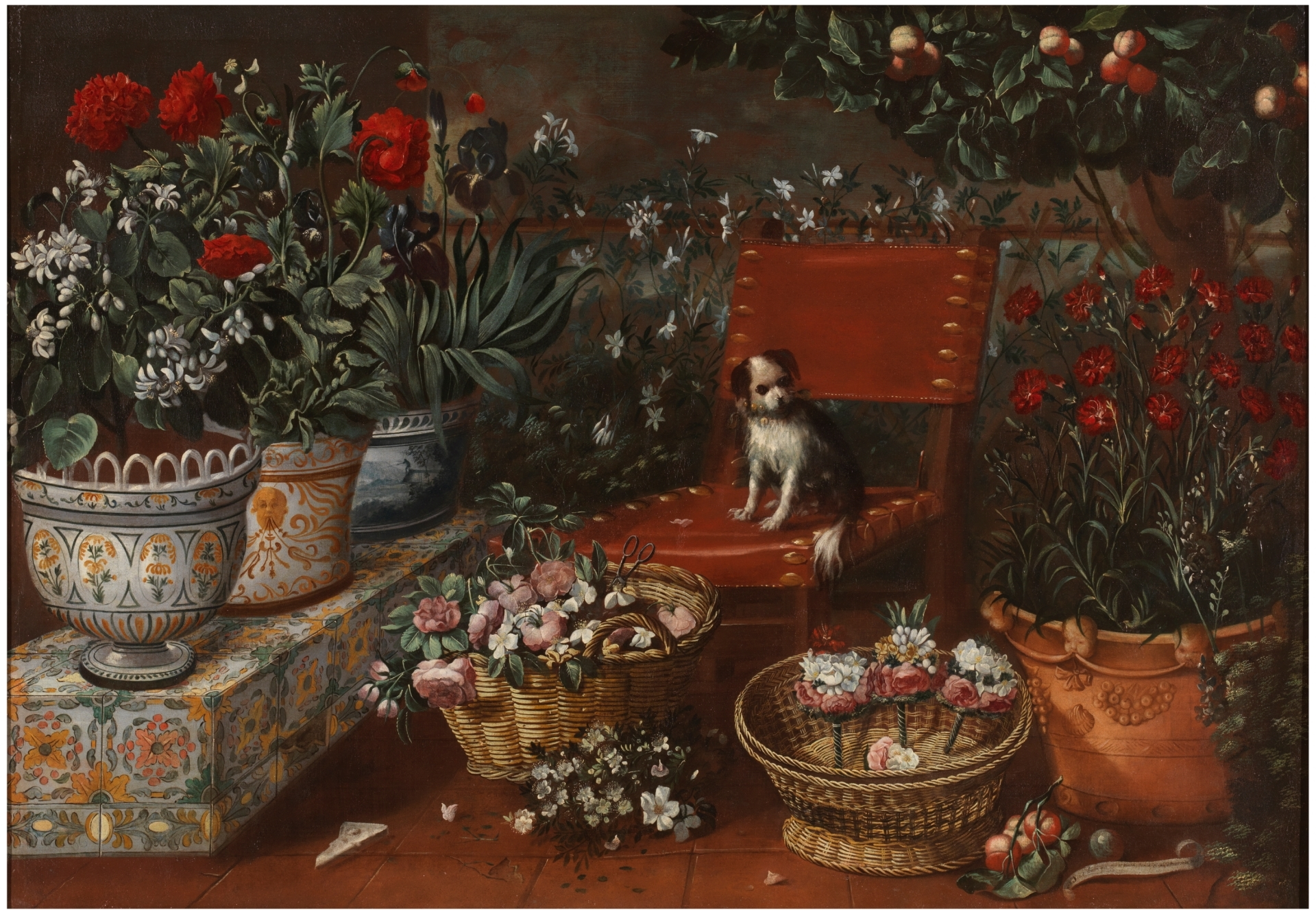
Garden Corner with a Dog (1660s), speculated to be a depiction of Yepes's own garden

Yepes also did paintings for clients. In 1632, he sold some of his fruit paintings for eight Valencian pounds to his notary Vicente Cortés. On 4 December 1633, he signed a deal worth 13 pounds and 10 wages with the merchant Juan Ruiz for a supply of fabric and cloth to be used for his paintings. On 2 August 1638, Simón Colomer received eight canvases from Yepes, fulfilling an order Colomer had placed in 1637.

William B. Jordan points to gaps in the timeline and life of Yepes; although he was active by the second decade of the 17th century, most of the works attributed to him come after 1642. In 1655, his paintings were displayed in the Convent of Santo Domingo during the second centenary of the canonization of Saint Vincent Ferrer. Yepes mainly chose to paint flower vases and fruits, for which he was known across the kingdom.

Like Francisco Pérez Sierra, Yepes grew different varieties of flowers in his backyard to use for his paintings. He continued to paint through the 1660s, and his signed works have been found dated up to the year of his death. Yepes died in Valencia on 16 June 1674, and was buried at St. Stephen's Church.

== Themes ==
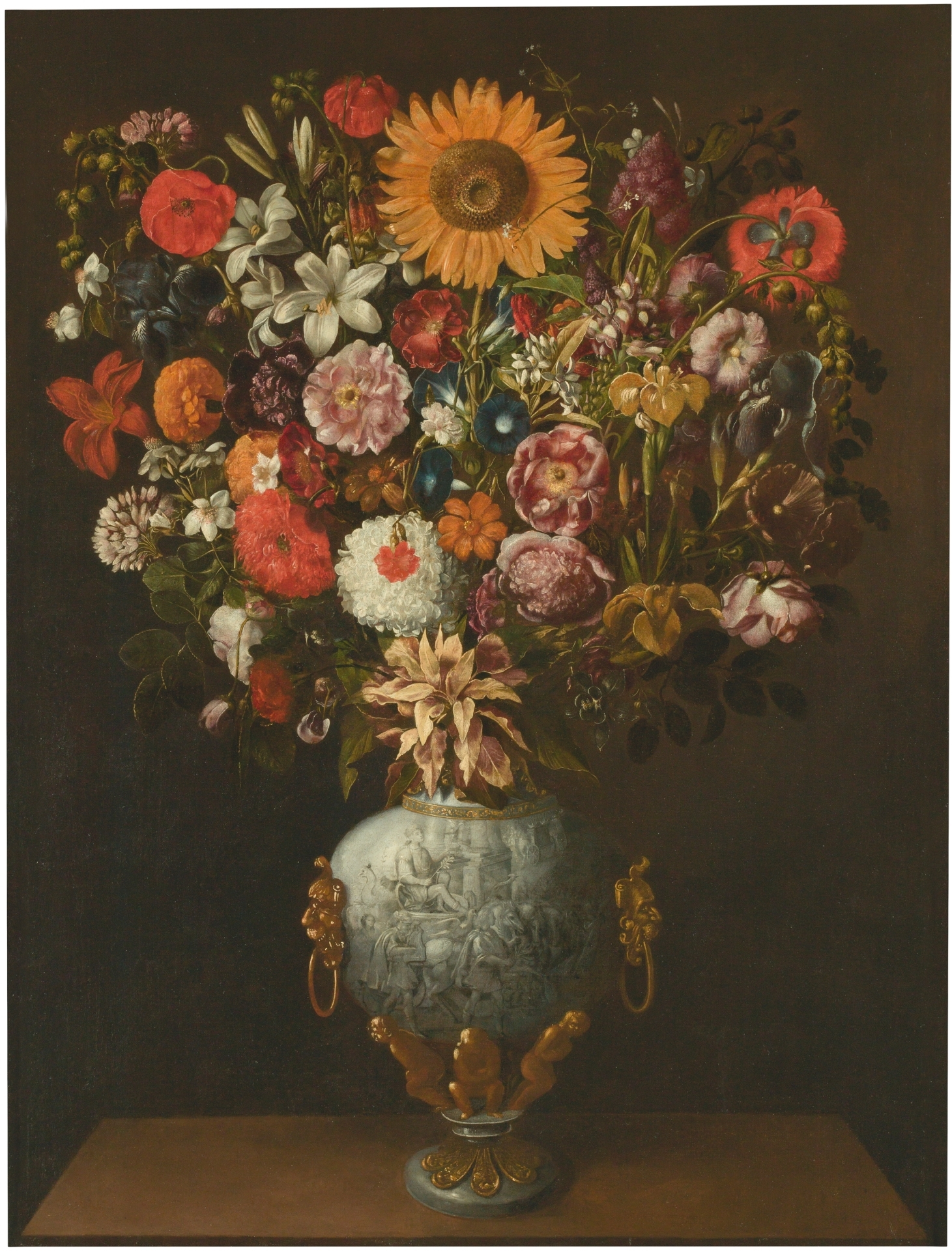
Vase with Quadriga Profile View (1643), painted crowdedly to produce a cumulative effect

Yepes specialised in painting bodegón and still lifes. His application of chiaroscuro and tenebrism, and compositional approach of contrast, detail and deep colour belong to the Spanish Baroque style of painting. He explored themes of naturalism in his bodegones and still lifes, albeit with motifs that represented prosperities of life in Valencia. This was in contrast to the works of contemporary Spanish Baroque painters which were defined by their austerity, and his paintings have been characterized as antiquated in context of the Spanish Golden Age.

Yepes is primarily noted for depicting flowers, fruits, and everyday objects on tables and against landscapes, and a lot of his paintings shared distinctive elements: flowers in ornate vases or ceramic pots, fruits in glossy or porcelain bowls (sometimes with landscapes drawn on them), and plain or decorative tablecloths (sometimes with lace). His works exhibit symmetrical designs without much disruption in patterns, with dim lighting and a varied range of colours. While his early works focused on attention to detail, he developed a smoother and free composition later in his life.

Yepes focused on painting flowers throughout his life, individually and as components of different types of paintings. His depictions of flower vases and pots are regarded to be distinctive in their style and incomparable to other bodegón painters of the time. In Vase with Quadriga Profile View (1643), he painted 26 species of flowers against a dark background, with a neutral vase and tablecloth to emphasize the colour and contrast of flowers. In Vase with Chariot seen from the Front (1643), he painted flowers in a vase separated from each other to focus on individual flowers and their symmetry, instead of producing a cumulative effect.

Yepes studied the works of Juan van der Hamen and some of his early paintings were similar to Hamen's style. Both employed symmetry of compositions, dark lighting, and highlighted the quality of objects by underlining their contours and applying multiple glazes. His paintings of sweets and desserts, such as Sweets and Nuts on a Table and Still Life with Sweets and Dried Fruit (1650), draw parallels to Hamen's works with themes of chiaroscuro, lateral illumination, and symmetry. His later works diverged from Hamen's style in that he introduced more variety of motifs, such as Manises ceramics in flower pots, Delft porcelain vases, rich branchy rugs, and landscapes.

Yepes was notable for his depictions of grapes, which he painted in three specific ways: individually with a focus on grapes; Still Life of Grapes (1649), as a part of a bodegón scene; Still Life with Grapes (1655), and complementary to a bigger scene or different theme Landscape with a Vine (1645). His grape paintings shared themes with those of de Espinosa, Juan Fernández el Labrador, Francisco de Zurbarán, and Pedro de Camprobín. Marcos Antonio Orellana praised his grape depictions and said of one that "a basket full of grapes, whose diaphanous and transparent grains, with their branches, could deceive the birds, like those other highly celebrated Zeuxis grapes."

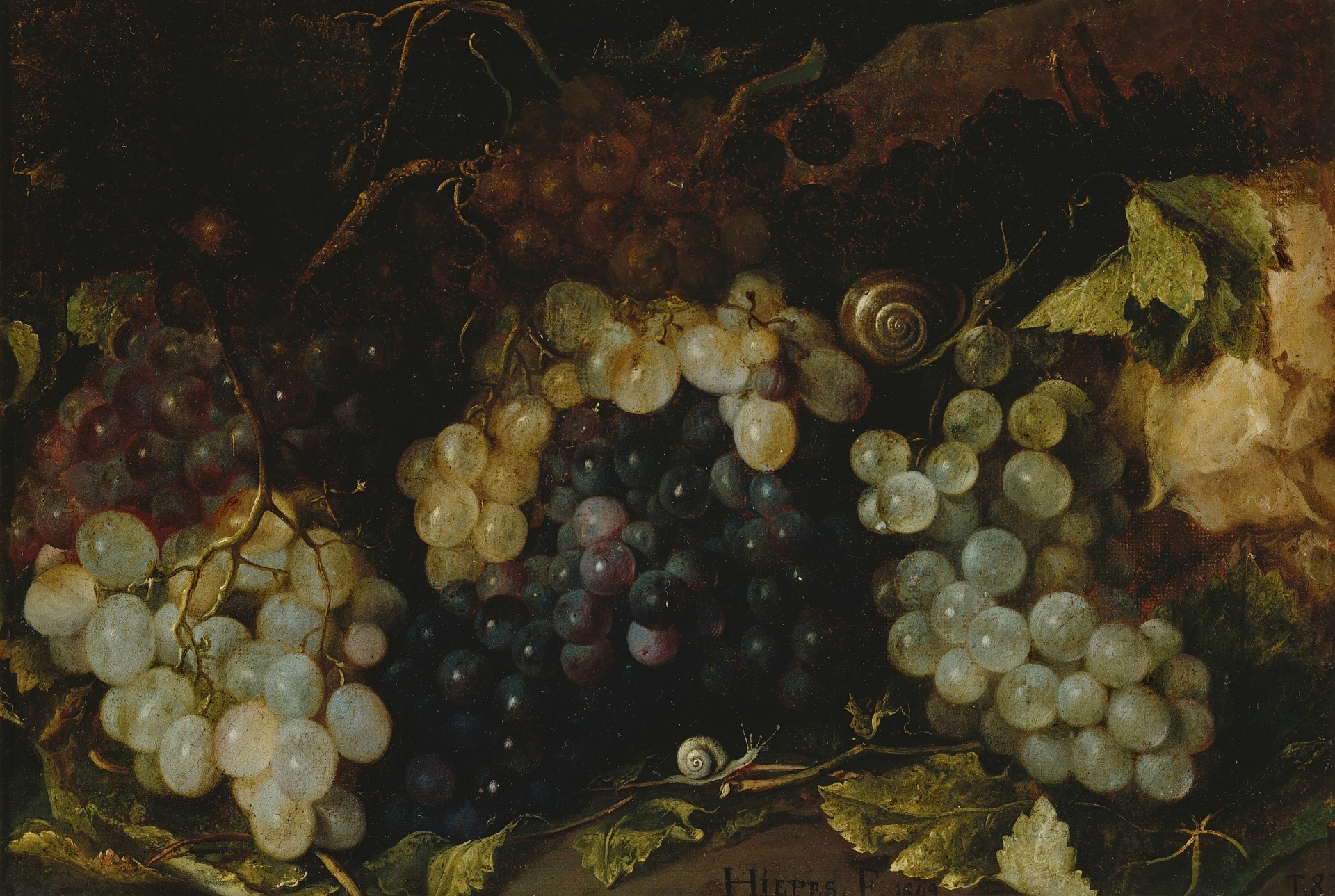
Still Life of Grapes (1649); utilizing motifs of outdoors setting, snails and lizards, which he incorporated into various other still lifes

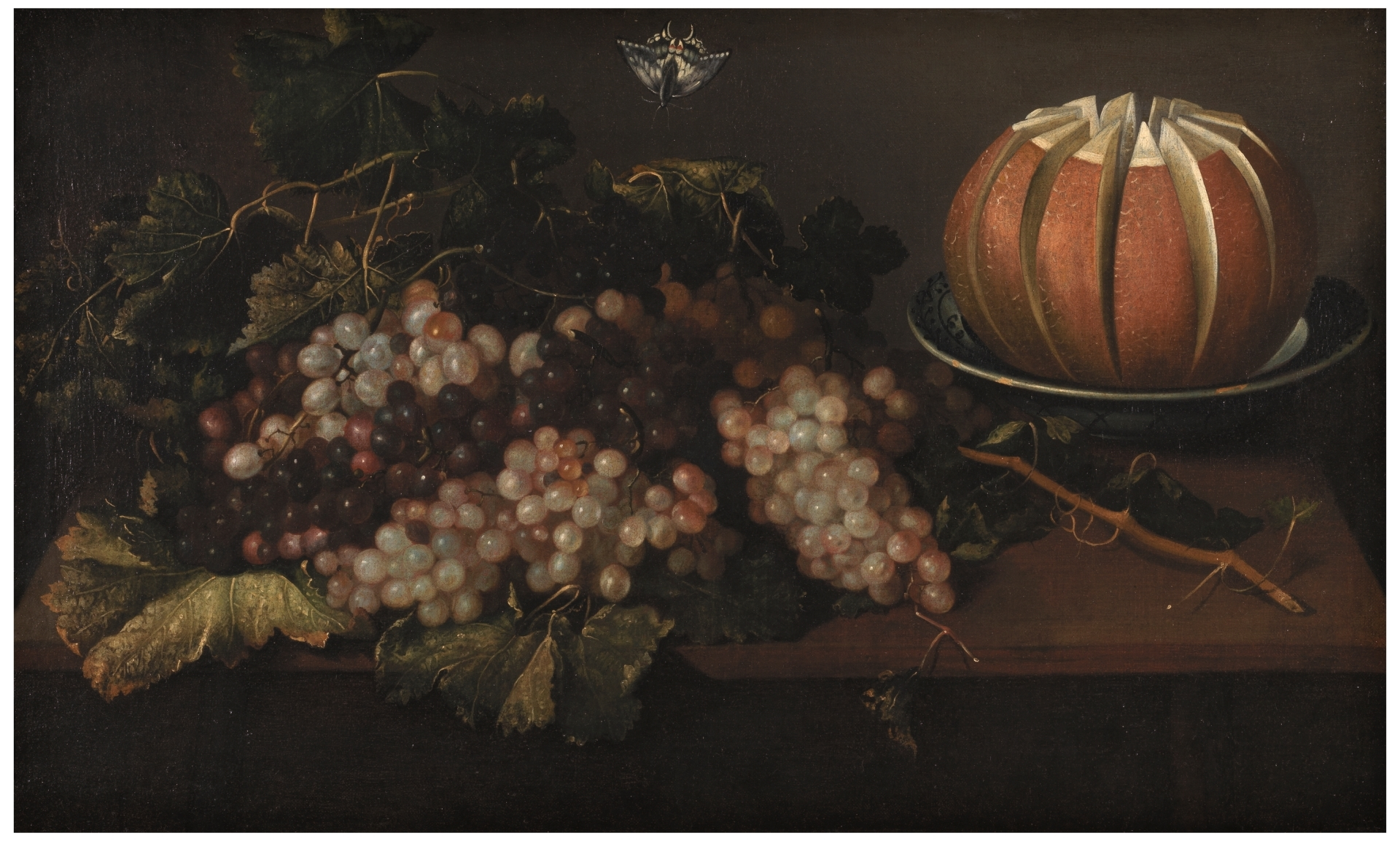
Still Life with Grapes (1655); bearing resemblance to the works of Juan Fernández el Labrador and Juan de Espinosa

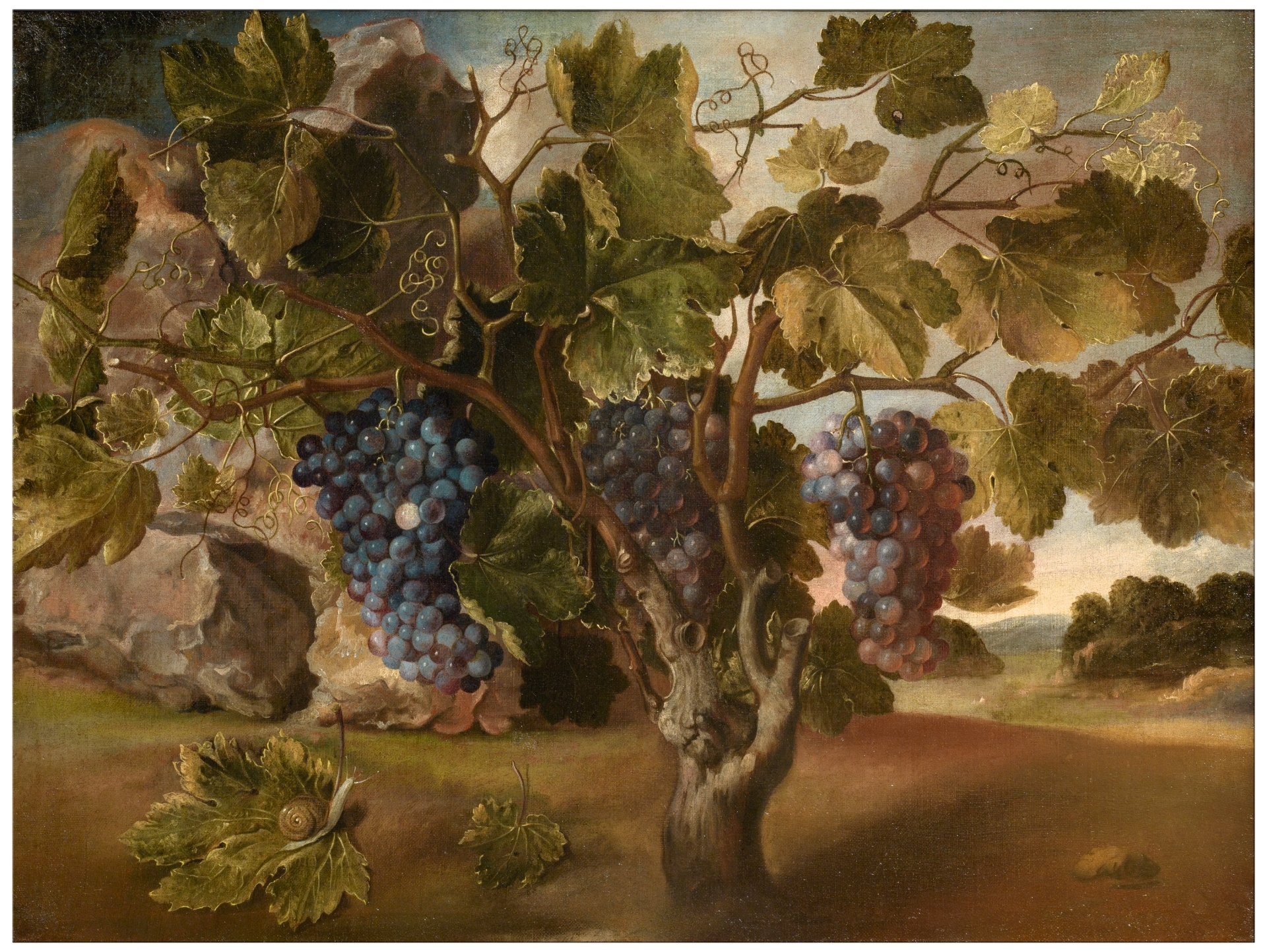
Landscape with a Vine (1645); a landscape painting with a free and smooth composition, reflective of his improved artistic skills

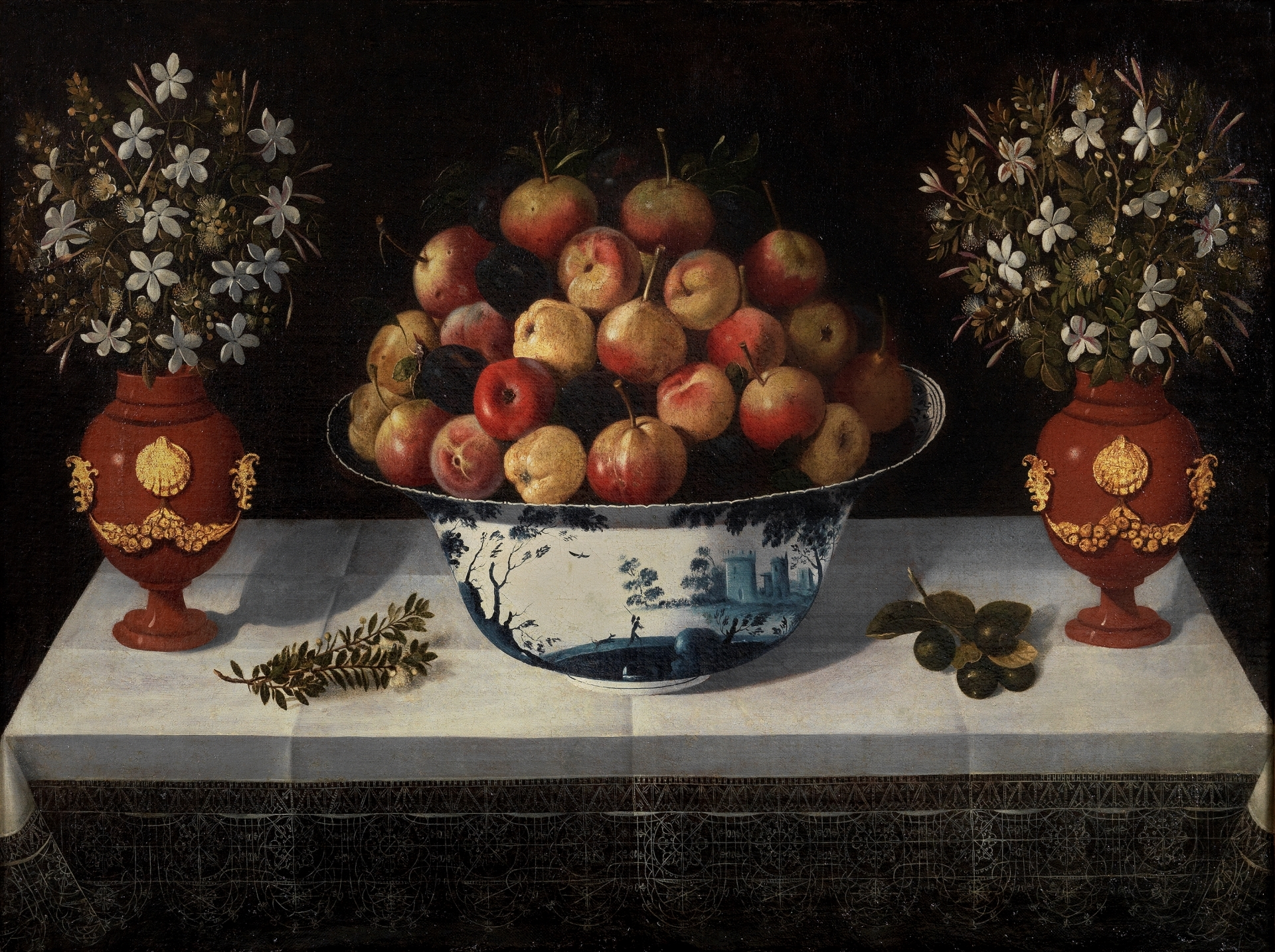
Delft Fruit Bowl and Two Vases of Flowers (1642), featuring most of his commonly used motifs

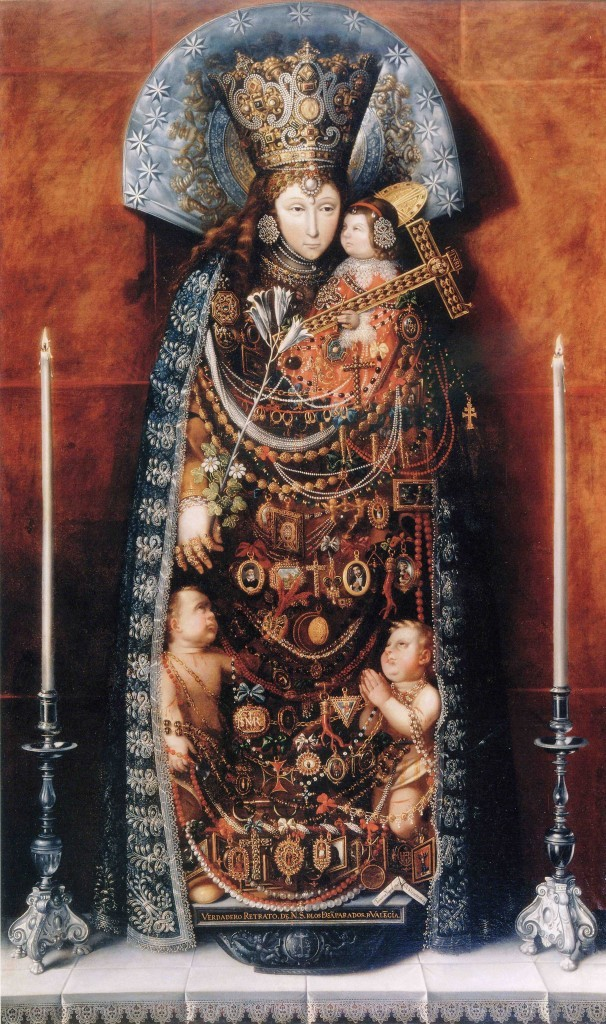
Virgin of the Forsaken (1644)

Virgin of the Forsaken (1644), a religious work in Baroque horror vacui style, is a trompe-l'œil of Our Lady of the Forsaken, patroness of Valencia, on an altar between two candelabra. The altar is covered with jewels, reliquaries, rosaries, and painted miniatures. Yepes also painted in vanitas genre; in Vanitas (17th-century), an artistic representation of fatalism, he arranged a skull and a femur with a book, an hourglass, a bouquet of flowers and a crucifix, on a plinth with inscriptions of I Corinthians 15:22 — Et sicut in Adam omnes moriuntur ita et in Christo omnes vivificabuntur (For as in Adam all die, so in Christ all will be made alive).

The influence of Flemish Baroque painting can be observed in some of Yepes's works, such as Four Pots of Flowers in a Garden (1663–64), which he painted in a more naturalistic and less ornamental manner. He made use of the now-lost Flemish painting, The Judgement of Solomon by Peter Paul Rubens, and Flemish engravings of Jacob Binck in Still Life with Ebony Desk and Vases (1654) to depict Minerva. Motifs of Levantine art can be observed in Still Life (1668) with his depiction of oranges and lemons in a basket suspended in a corner, a roast bird and empanada.

Yepes also explored animal and genre painting — as seen in Garden Corner with a Dog (1660s) for the former, and Hunter Drinking in a Stream (1650) and Hunter Asleep in a Landscape (1650) for the latter. In Still Life of Birds and Hare (1643) he painted carcasses of birds of various species hanging in a symmetrical manner on both sides with a plucked hen in the middle, and viscera, sausages and eggs on the table—similar to the approach of Jacopo da Empoli and Alejandro de Loarte.

An allegorical painting by Yepes is Allegory of the Senses (c. 1650), in which sound is represented by a guitar, smell by flowers, taste by a soup bowl, sight by a document, and touch by jewelry.

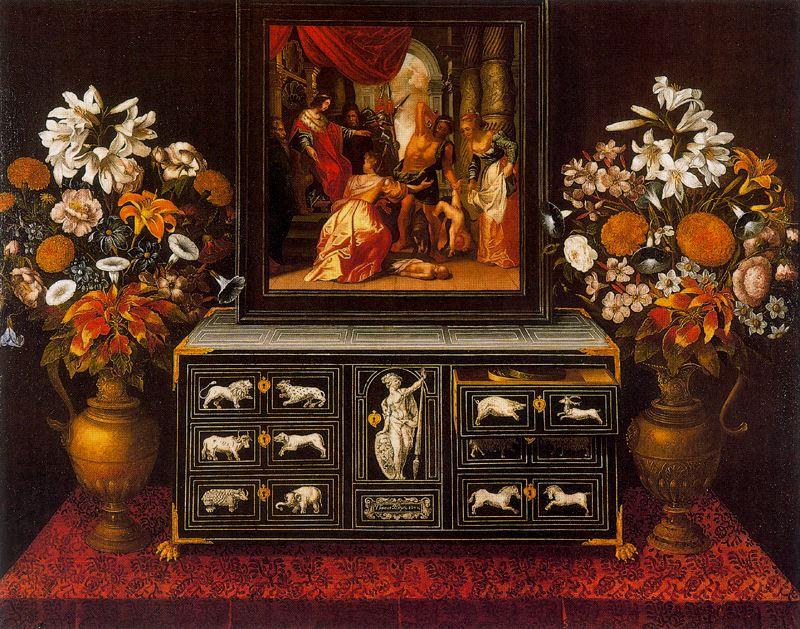
Still Life with Ebony Desk and Vases (1654); painted with Flemish Baroque influences.

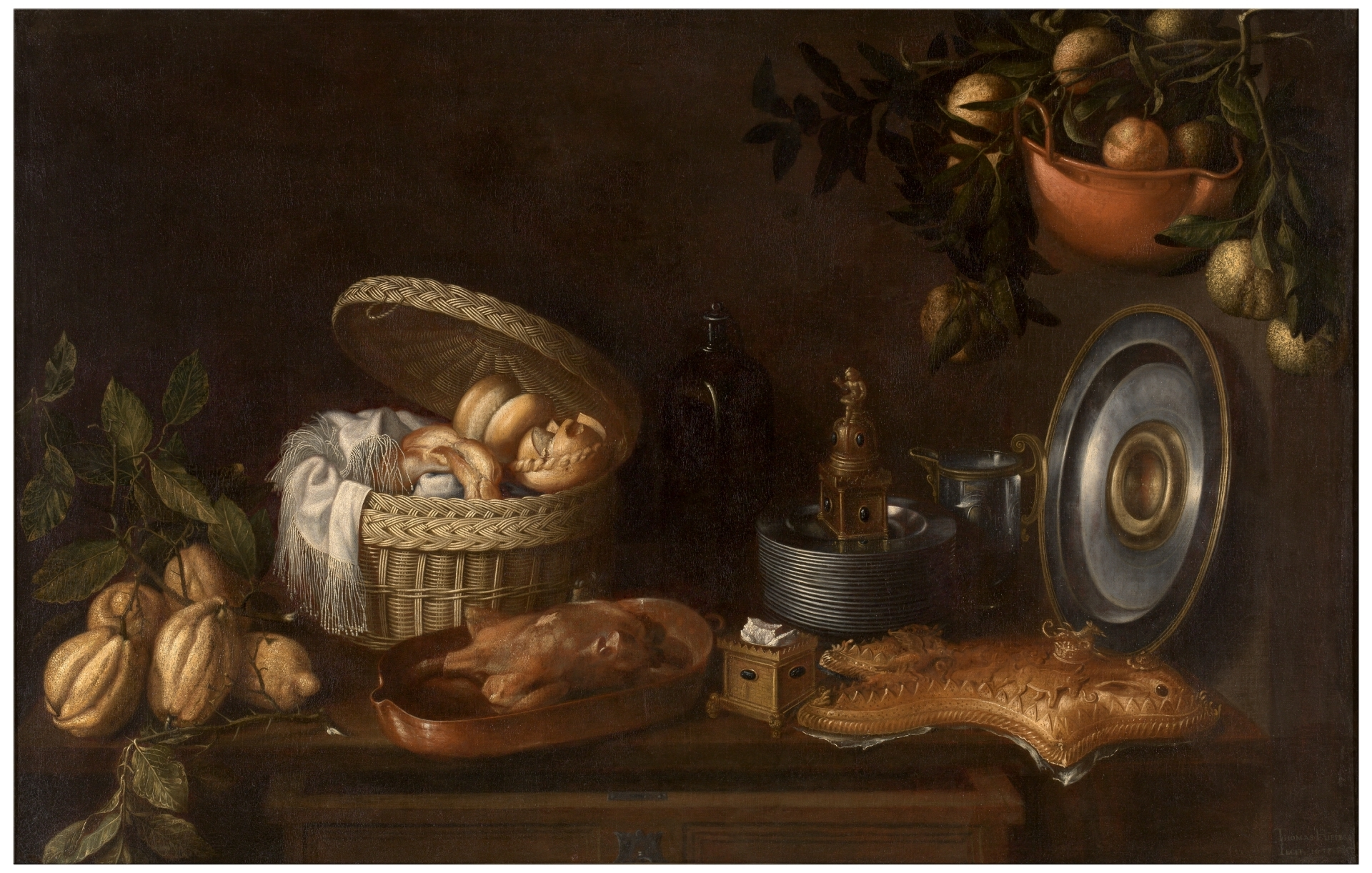
Still Life (1668); with arrangement of components similar to the themes of Levantine art.

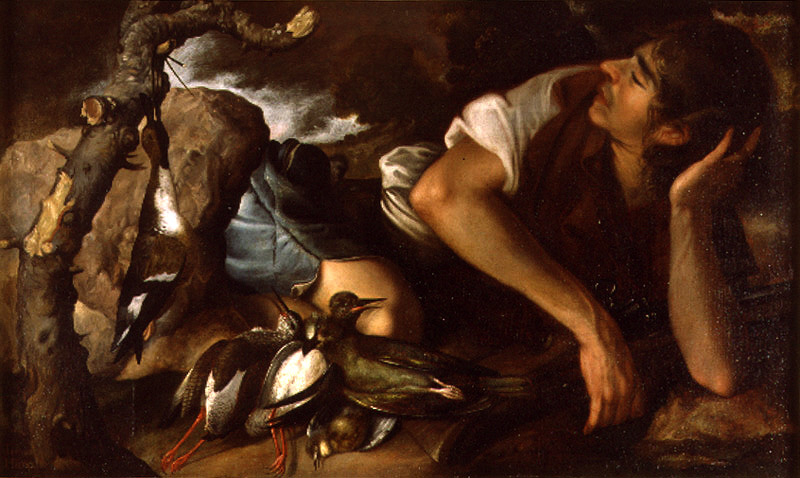
Hunter Asleep in a Landscape (1650); one of his few paintings to feature human models and animal carcasses.

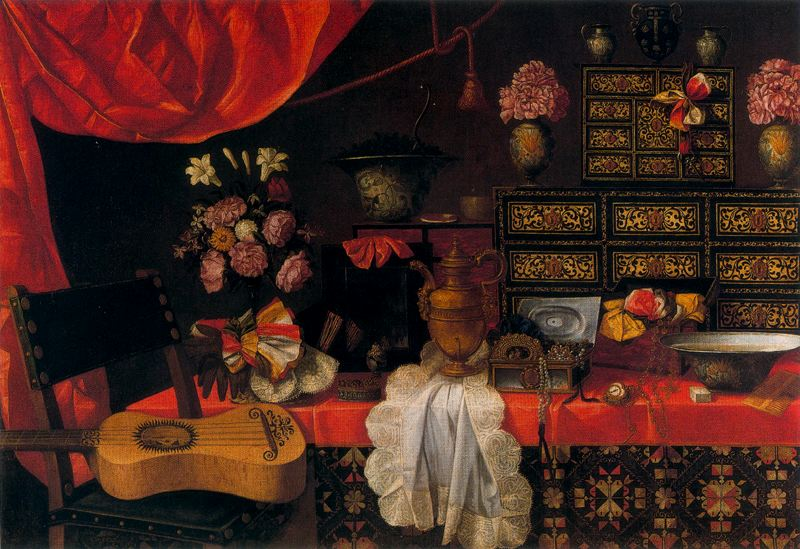
Allegory of the Senses (c. 1650); an allegorical work representing the five traditional senses.

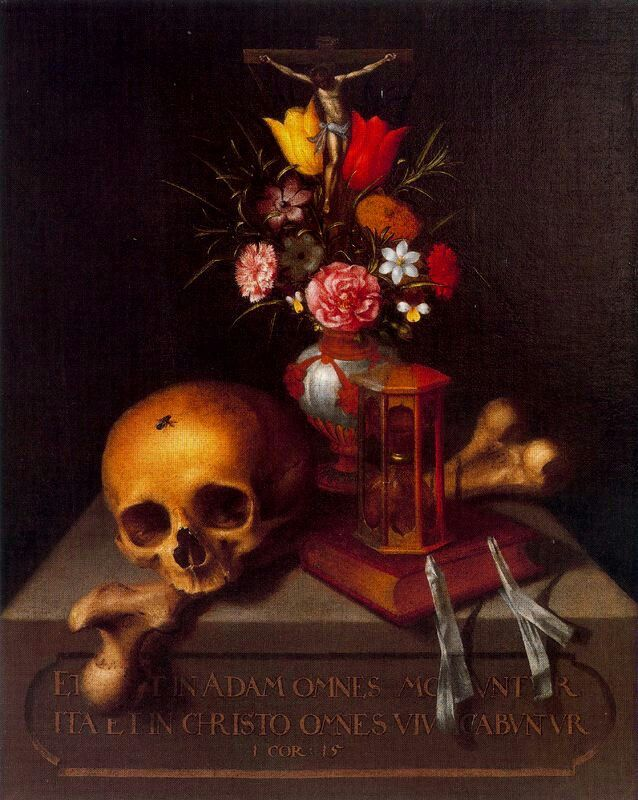
Vanitas (17th-century)

== Works ==
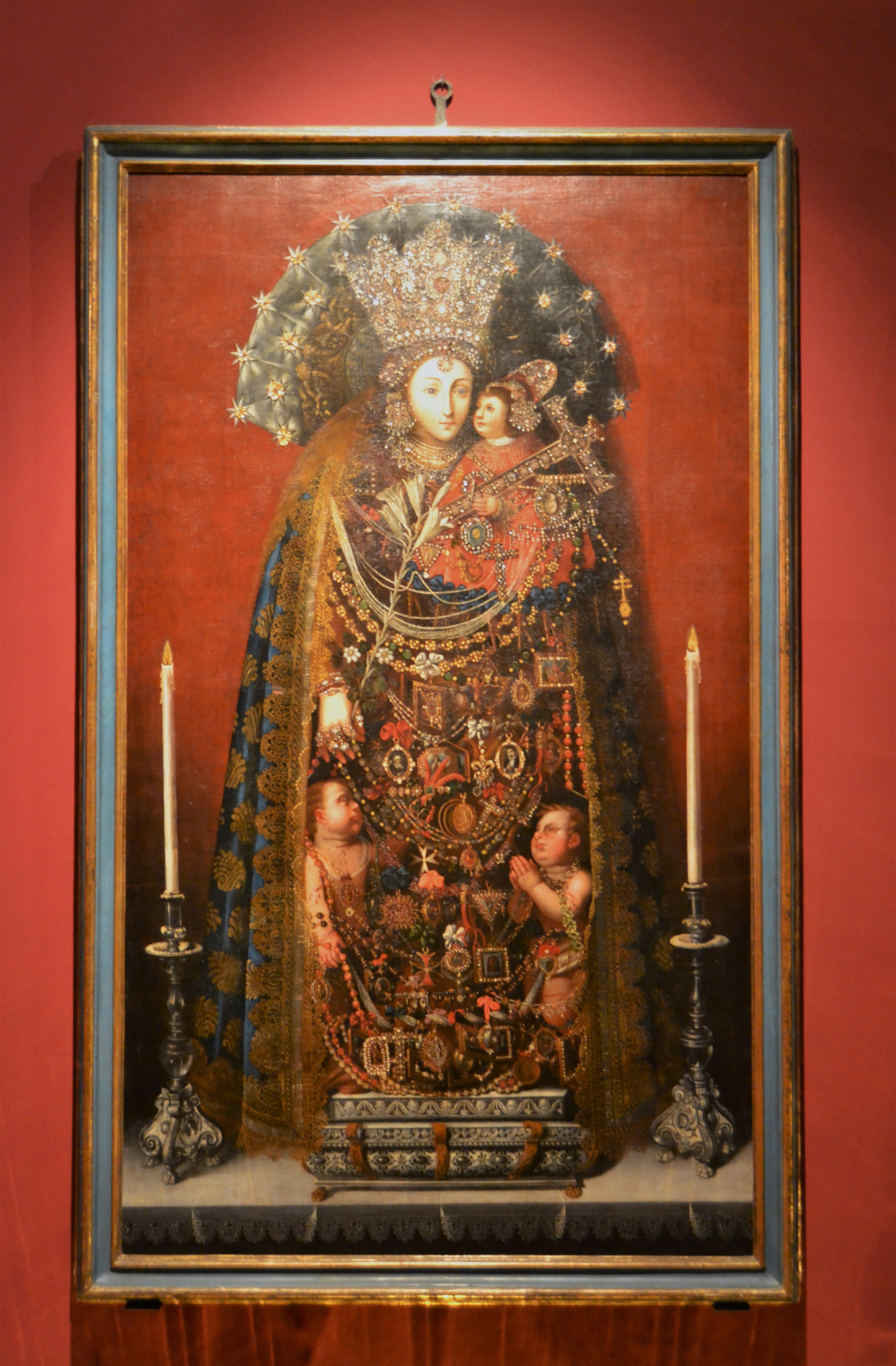
Mother of God of the Forsaken (1640s) at the Church of St. Thomas and St. Philip Neri.

Museo del Prado in Madrid has the most extensive collection of Yepes's paintings, with over 15 works. In 2006, seven works were added to the museum from the private collection of Rosendo Naseiro, including two of his earliest surviving works, Delft Fruit Bowl and Two Vases of Flowers (1642) and Two Fruit Bowls on a Table (1642). Still Life of Birds and Hare (1643), Landscape with a Vine (1645), and two other paintings of vases were also added from the Naseiro collection.

Virgin of the Forsaken (1644) is located at the Convent of Las Descalzas Reales, Madrid. A version of the same painting is at the Church of St. Thomas and St. Philip Neri, Mother of God of the Forsaken (1640s). His works preserved in the Museum of Fine Arts of Valencia include Still Life with a Ceramic Fruit Bowl (1650), Hunter Drinking in a Stream (1650) and Hunter Asleep in a Landscape (1650).

The Fondation Raus pour le Tiers-Monde, Zurich, has two farmyard scenes: Turkey, Partridge and Pigeon on a Terrace (1649) and Rooster, Hen and Chicks (1649). Four Pots of Flowers in a Garden (1663–64) is a part of the J. and D. de Menil Collection in Houston.

Most of his other works are in various museums and private collections worldwide.

=== Pseudo-Hiepes ===
In Spanish Still Life from Velázquez to Goya (1995), Jordan and art historian Peter Cherry published the term "Pseudo-Hiepes" to describe an artist whose identity was then unknown, but had around 40 still life paintings from the second half of the 17th-century attributed to them. Italian art historians had previously suggested an Italian origin for the artist since some of their paintings paralleled how Caravaggio used shadows, and had named them the "Master of the Lombard Fruit Bowl" based on a painting they were known for. Jordan was critical of that analysis in An Eye on Nature: Spanish Still-life Paintings from Sanchez Cotan to Goya (1997), and argued that in addition to Caravaggio-esque lateral lighting which divides their paintings diagonally, their works also exhibited symmetrical themes and static compositions — motifs which were archaic for the period from which the paintings came from, and commonly implemented in artworks from the Kingdom of Aragon towards the latter half of the 17th century.

One of Yepes's known signatures, from Still Life of Grapes

Jordan used "Pseudo-Hiepes" because one of those paintings had "Hiepes" engraved in a compact cursive handwriting on the front, and was cataloged as a Yepes painting by Vicente Poleró in 1870. Jordan reassessed the painting, and deattributed the work from Yepes's œuvre stating that all of Yepes's known signatures were much larger and used capital letters, and that the false inscription was most likely a 19th-century addition.

Jordan further reasoned that both Yepes and Pseudo-Hiepes incorporated outdated compositions relative to their time. They both utilized dark backgrounds for contrast with a wide range of colours, solid bases which span the full length of the painting uniformly, had light coming from left with translucent shadows falling backwards and towards the right side, and their paintings always had elements facing the front which are painted from a top angle. Overall balance and symmetry were fundamental to works of both artists, and they made use of similar components in style and substance. Jordan claimed that peculiar similarities of their furniture paintings must have aided Poleró in making the wrong attribution.

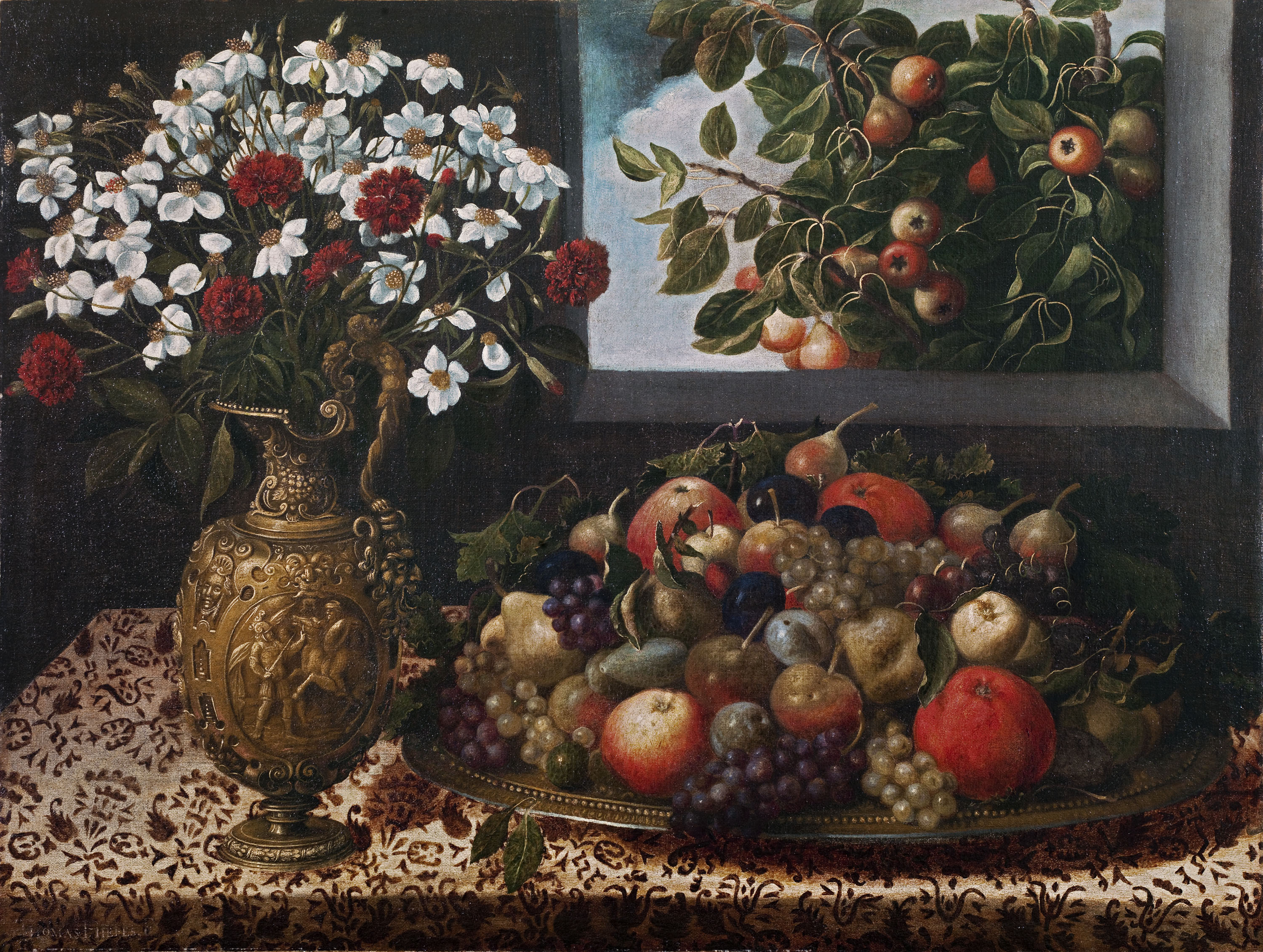
Still Life with Fruits and Vase with Flowers (1645–50) by Yepes

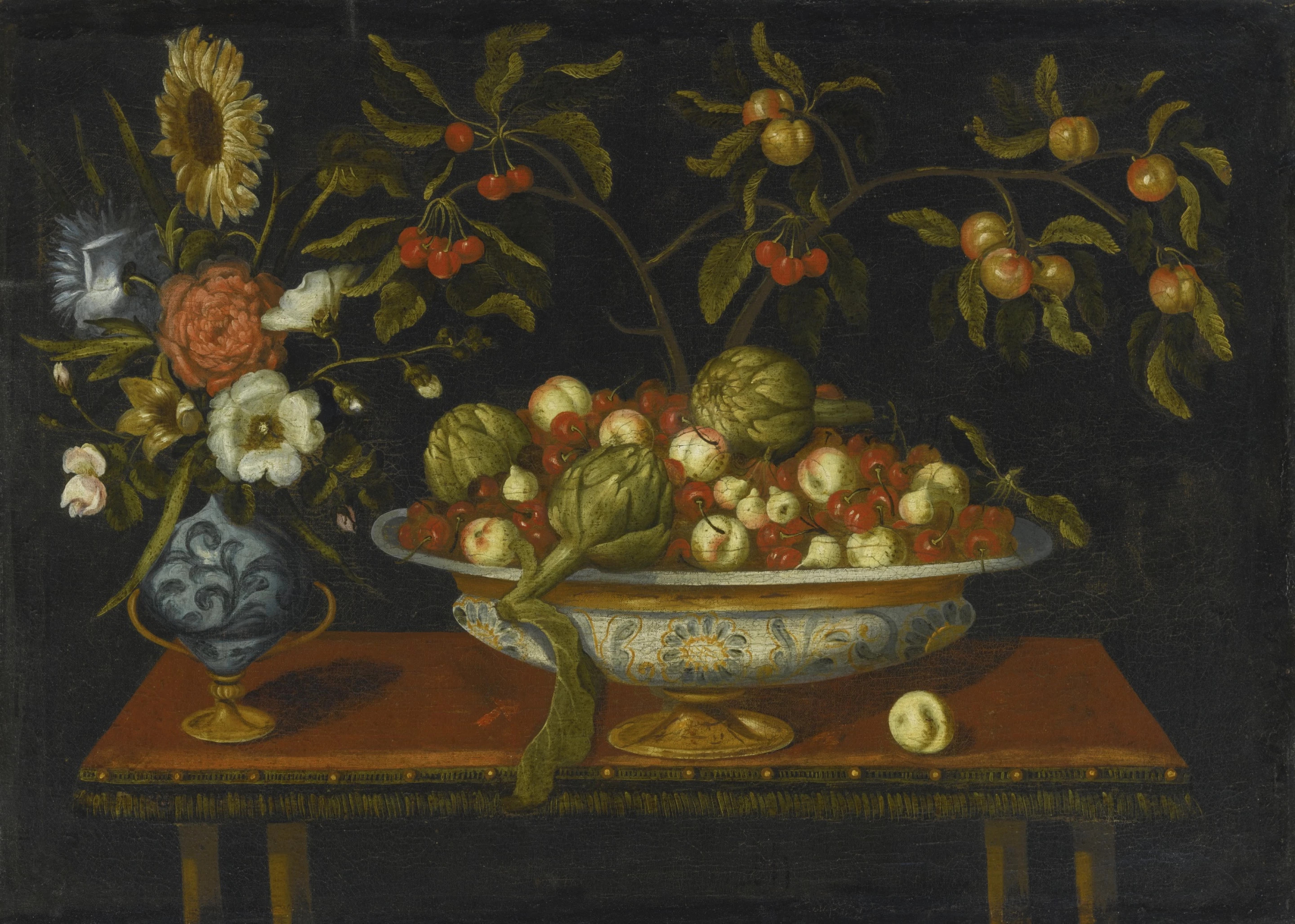
Still Life of Artichokes, Cherries and Peaches in a Ceramic Bowl and a Vase with Flowers (17th-century) then-attributed to Pseudo-Hiepes

Both share common motifs: ornamental flower vase, over-filled decorative fruit bowl, lateral illumination from left with soft shadows falling backwards and to the right, ornate base with a uniform design, symmetry of components, on the backdrop of a tree with fruits on branches, and an overall balanced composition against a dark background.

A signed still life by Bernardo Polo of Aragon was discovered in 2009, which according to Jordan is nearly identical in its facture and composition to the paintings of Pseudo-Hiepes. Jordan stated that the signed painting sharing the exact same elements with various works of Pseudo-Hiepes proves that Polo was indeed the artist whom he had termed "Pseudo-Hiepes".

== Legacy ==
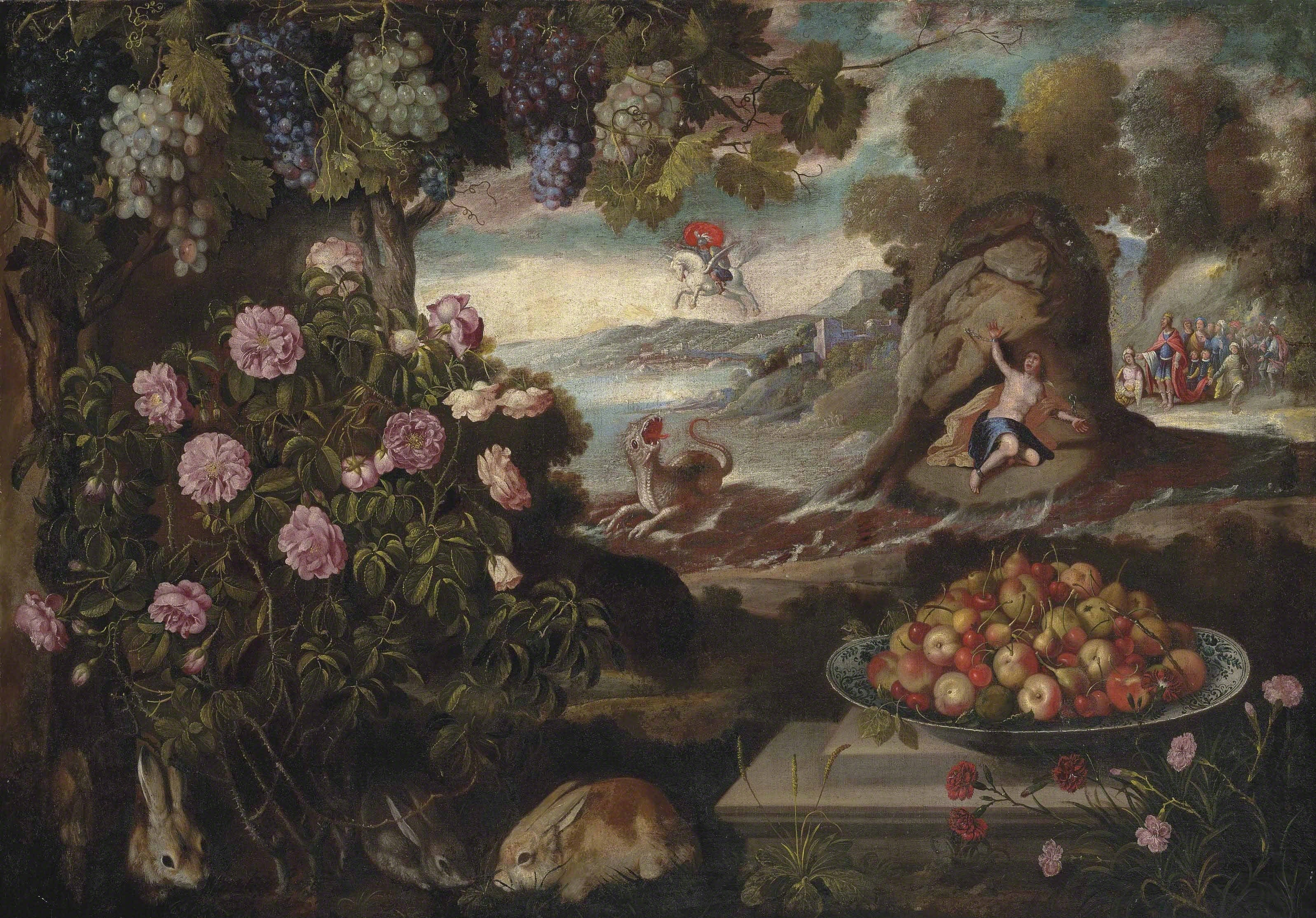
Still Life with Perseus, Andromeda and the Dragon of Poseidon (17th-century), a rare history painting by Yepes; William B. Jordan summarized that "his surviving works corroborate that the range of his subject matter was extremely broad and his output prolific."

Yepes was a prominent painter in Valencia during his lifetime, and he remained a notable figure of the kingdom into the 17th and 18th century. He is regarded as the most important bodegón painter of the Baroque movement in Valencia.

Spanish writer Marco Antonio Ortí in his 1655 book wrote that Yepes had "acquired a very unique opinion and credit" in the kingdom. Jordan assessed that Yepes's "works are brimming with an irresistible provincial charm and a delightful inventiveness suggestive of the sybaritic life of this prosperous Mediterranean seaport". Despite his local significance, he was first mentioned in a nationwide publication over a century after his death—in 1800, when Juan Agustín Ceán Bermúdez published his biographical dictionary of the prominent artists of Spain, Diccionario historico de los mas ilustres profesores de las Bellas Artes de Espana.

Spanish art historians Alfonso E. Pérez Sánchez and Benito Navarrete Prieto organized a monographic exhibition of Yepes's works at the Centre Cultural Bancaixa, Valencia, in 1995. The catalogue included archival research performed by Prieto which contributed to the existing knowledge of Yepes's life and works. A reviewer summarized that the "Yepes was greatly admired in his own day and has been a major rediscovery of our time. This exhibition demonstrated that not only is Yepes one of the most skilled and exquisite of painters, but maintained the interest of his patrons and collectors with his expertise in flower painting and a range of different still-life types."
