= Marcos Orellana =

Marcos Orellana may refer to:

- Marcos Antonio Orellana (1731–1813), Spanish erudite, jurist and writer
- Marcos A. Orellana (born 1971), Chilean/U.S. expert in international environmental law
- Marcos Orellana (parathlete), Guatemalan table tennis player
