= Juan de Espinosa =

Spanish painter

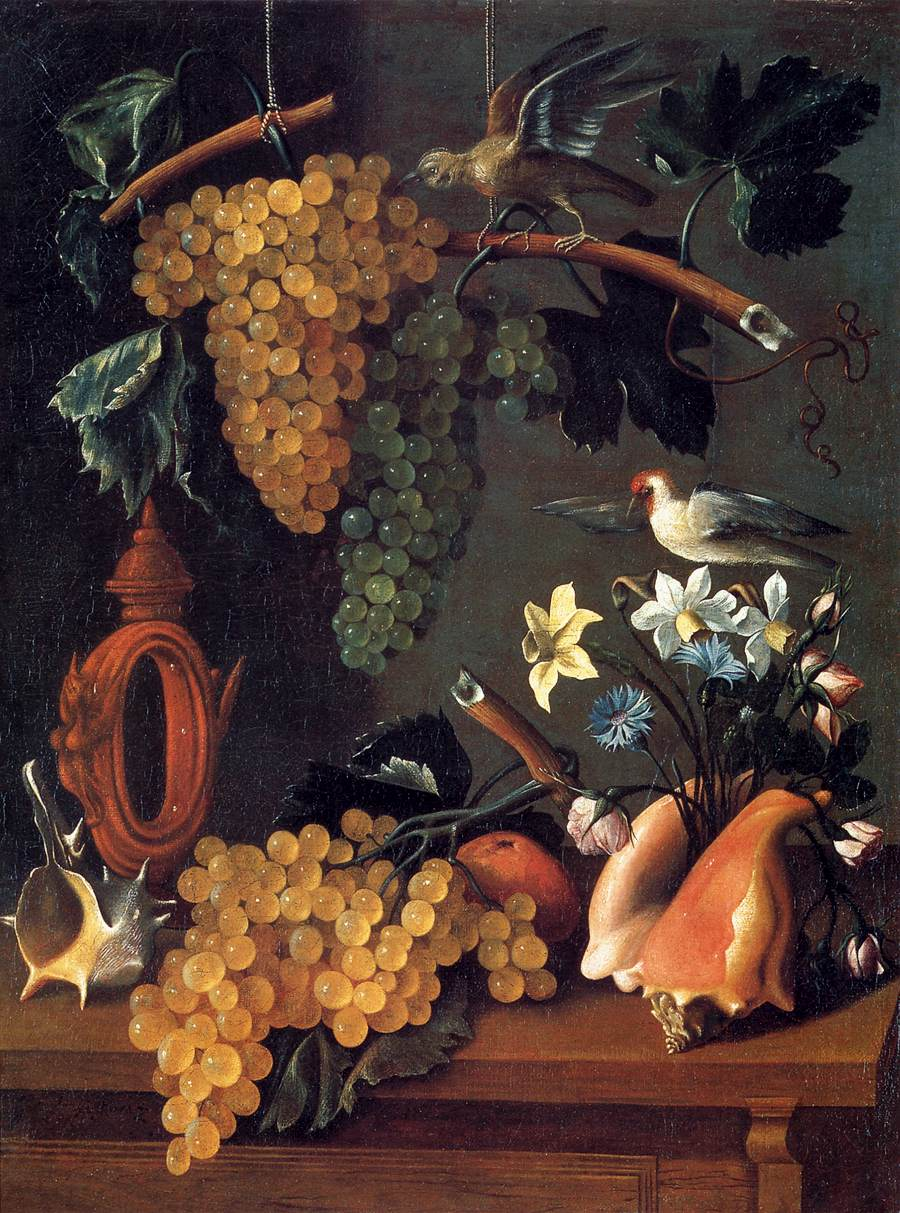
Still-Life with Grapes, Flowers and Shells by Juan de Espinosa, The Louvre

Juan de Espinosa, (active 1628 and 1659), Spanish Baroque painter specializing in still life painting. There is a great deal of confusion in the documentation of de Espinosa's life and works because there are a number of artists using the same name who also painted still lifes around the same time.

== Early life ==
Juan de Espinosa, gilder of altarpieces, was documented in Madrid between 1608 and 1613, married Maria de Aranda in the parish of San Sebastián. The second son of this marriage, born in 1610 and also named Juan, might be the better known of the two still-life painters of this name.

The greatest of still-life painters Espinosa was signing his works Joanes Bapta. Despinosa faciebat Anno D’1624. A still life of silver pieces, using the same formula he used in 1612, was submitted to join the brotherhood of the Sacrament of the parish of San Sebastian in Madrid. In uncertain date valued the altarpiece of the parish of Alcaudete de la Jara. Little else is known about him except that he had died already in 1641 when his widow made a will. Stylistically a painter closely associated with the work of Juan van der Hamen, with the same sense of order and symmetry.

The second, younger, still active in 1659, Juan de Espinosa signed the letter of dowry the painter Francisco de Burgos Mantilla in 1645, the same date wearing a still life of flowers and fruits, The Louvre Museum, signed in the same way. This is a free painter of bright colors and strong lighting applied to complex compositions. In the same hand as the Louvre are two separate oil fruit still life Museo del Prado and the dead bird life with the Museum of Córdoba, from three of the royal collections, all of which shows the same precious treatment of grapes, made based glazes, clear red and intonation. More complex is the relationship established between the individual parts still life with grapes octagonal, signed in 1646, entered in 2006 at the Museo del Prado, which again appears a dead bird, but now in a diagonal, between bunches of grapes, pears, apples, some dried fruit and Mexican red clay pileup similar to that used in the still life of the Louvre. The detailed treatment and also fresh fruit, particularly grapes, which seem to receive the light from within, and the use of back to profile branch leaves, approximates stylistically the work of this painter to the work of Juan Fernández, Labrador.

== Other same name ==
Still another Juan de Espinosa was a known contemporary painter who died in 1653 in San Millán de la Cogolla, while working on the paintings of the cloister, painter of religious works discreet respect for tradition chiaroscuro.
