= Bernardo Polo =

Spanish painter

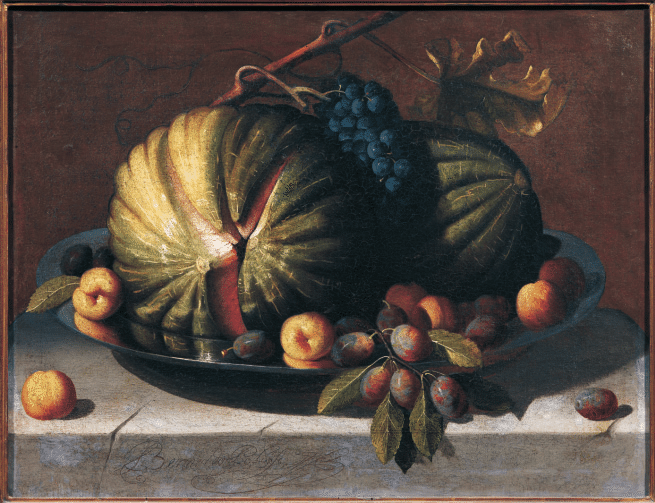
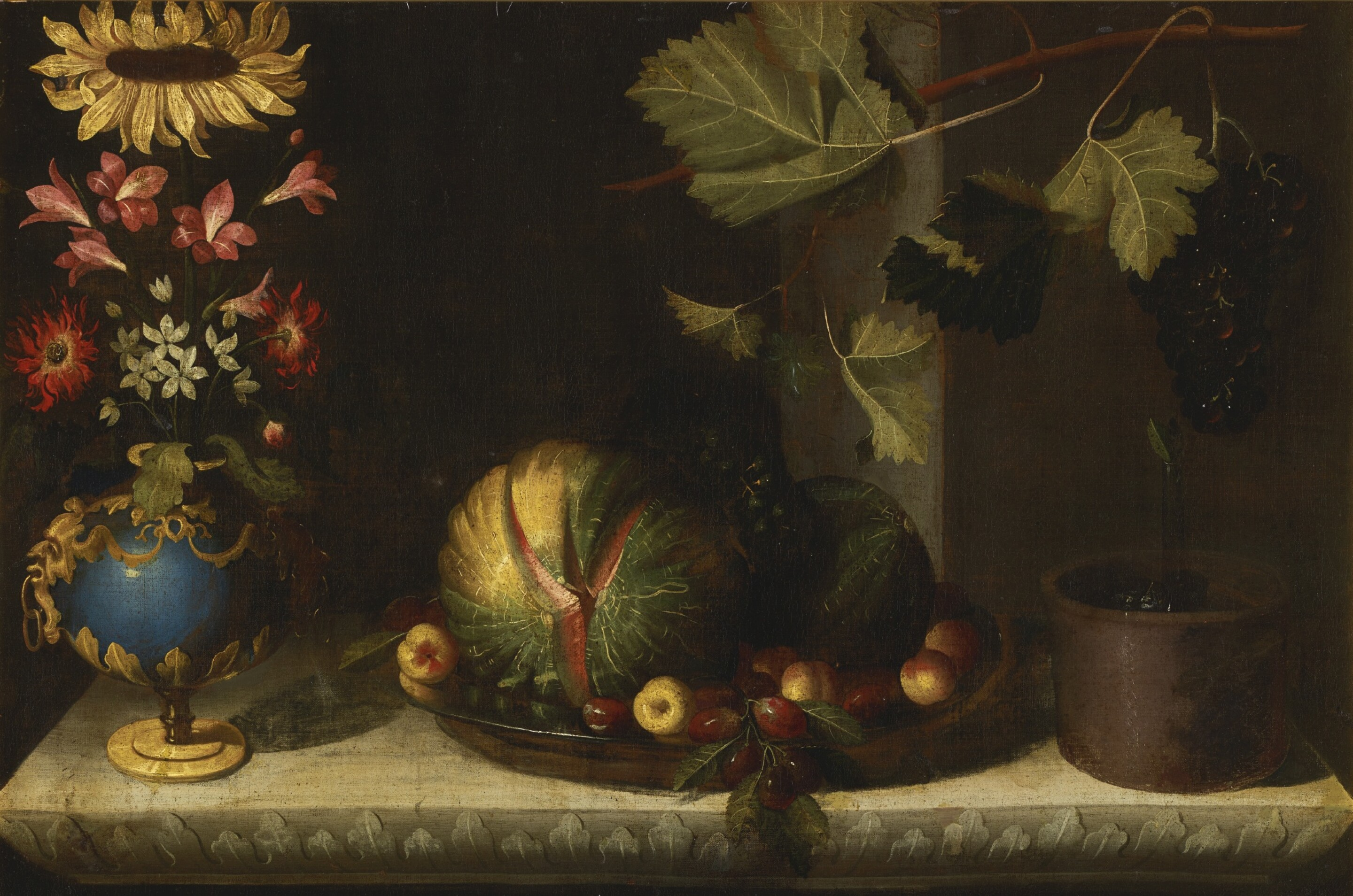
After a signed painting by Polo, Pewter Dish with Melons, Grapes, Apricots and Plums (17th-century; left), was discovered in 2009, around 40 still lifes previously attributed to Pseudo-Hiepes (derived from Tomás Hiepes), such as Still Life with Vase of Flowers, Fruit Bowl and Vine (17th-century; right), were reattributed to Polo

Bernardo Polo (died c. 1700) was a Spanish painter, active in Zaragoza, depicting still-life paintings of fruit and flowers. He worked in 1680 and died about 1700.
