= Juan van der Hamen =

Spanish painter

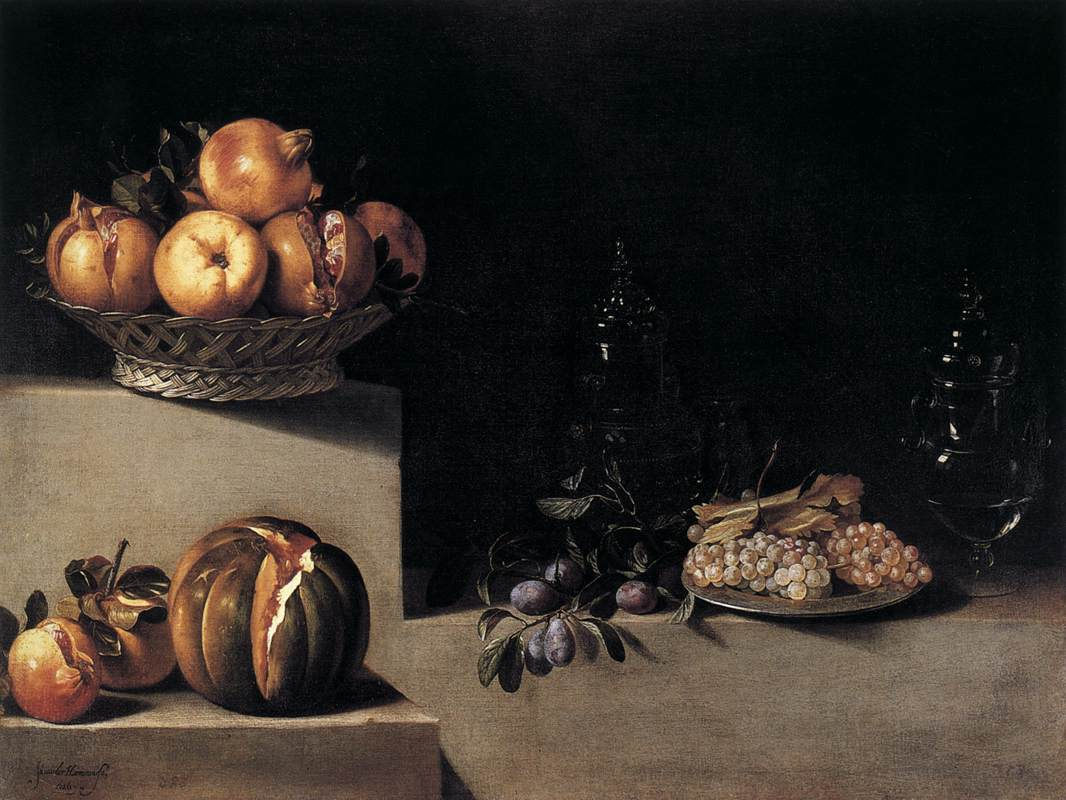
- Still life with fruits and glassware, Museum of Fine Arts, Houston
- Born: Juan van der Hamen y Gómez de León bapt. 8 April 1596; Madrid
- Died: 28 March 1631 (aged 34)
- Known for: Painting
- Movement: bodegones, still life

Juan van der Hamen y (Gómez de) León (baptized 8 April 1596 – 28 March 1631) was a Spanish painter, a master of still life paintings, also called bodegones. Prolific and versatile, he painted allegories, landscapes, and large-scale works for churches and convents. Today he is remembered mostly for his still lifes, a genre he popularized in 1620s Madrid.

== Life ==
Juan van der Hamen was baptized on 8 April 1596 in Madrid and was probably born there just days before that date. His father was Jan van der Hamen, a Flemish courtier, who had moved from Brussels to Madrid as an archero in the King's noble guard before 1586. According to 18th-century sources, he was also a painter, but there is no evidence for this.

Juan van der Hamen's mother was Dorotea Witman Gómez de León, a half-Flemish woman of noble Toledan ancestry. Van der Hamen and his two brothers Pedro and Lorenzo, both of whom were writers, emphasized their Spanish roots by using all or part of their maternal grandmother's family name, Gómez de León.

Juan van der Hamen inherited his father's honorary positions at the court of Philip II and also served as unsalaried painter of the king. Van der Hamen's artistic activity in the service of the crown is first recorded on 10 September 1619, when he was paid for painting a still life for the country palace of El Pardo, to the north of Madrid.

== Works ==
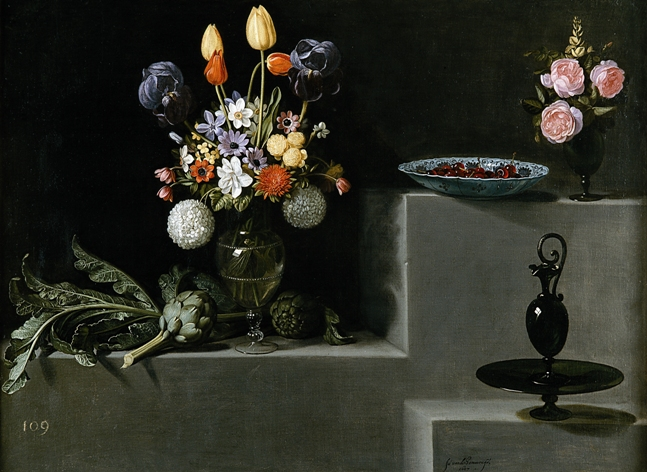
Still life with flowers, artichokes and glassware, 1627 Museo del Prado

Noted for his versatility, Juan van der Hamen painted religious history paintings; allegories, landscapes, low-life subjects, portraits and still lifes but the last two categories brought him the greatest fame. He served at the courts of Philip III and Philip IV and established the popularity of the new genre of still life in Madrid in the 1620s.

A prolific artist, van der Hamen painted all his works during the first decade of the reign of Philip IV. It is known that he painted more still lifes in 1622 than in any other period of his life.

He also reached great personal fame as a portraitist, being this field, the one that provided him with greater personal success, since still life was considered a lesser genre. He executed a portrait of Philip IV and worked during the 1620s in a series of portraits of the principal intellectuals and writers of his time, including: Lope de Vega, Francisco de Quevedo, Luis de Góngora, Jose de Valdivieso, Juan Pérez de Montalbán, Juan Ruiz de Alarcón and Francisco de Rioja. On van der Hamen's death, twenty of these portraits were inventoried as a single item among his belongings. The portrait of his older brother, Lorenzo van der Hamen, probably belonged to this series. The series itself was a focal point for philosophic speculation on the art of portraiture by some of the most distinguished minds of the time, who frequently praised Juan van der Hamen in verse and prose.

Among Van der Hamen portraits, there is one of a dwarf, painted around 1623 in a powerful naturalistic style. This painting (Madrid, Museo del Prado) anticipated the later made by Velázquez.

In 1626, van der Hamen painted cardinal Francesco Barberini, after a previous portrait by Velázquez had failed to please the sitter. Well satisfied with his work Cardinal Barberini acquired three further works from him.

As a religious painter Juan van der Hamen worked for several religious institutions in and around Madrid and Toledo, like the Monastery of the Descalzas Reales, in Madrid, for which he painted altars. Few of these paintings are extant. The best surviving examples of his religious work are in the cloister of the Royal Convent of La Encarnación in Madrid, painted in 1625 in a naturalistic tenebristic style.

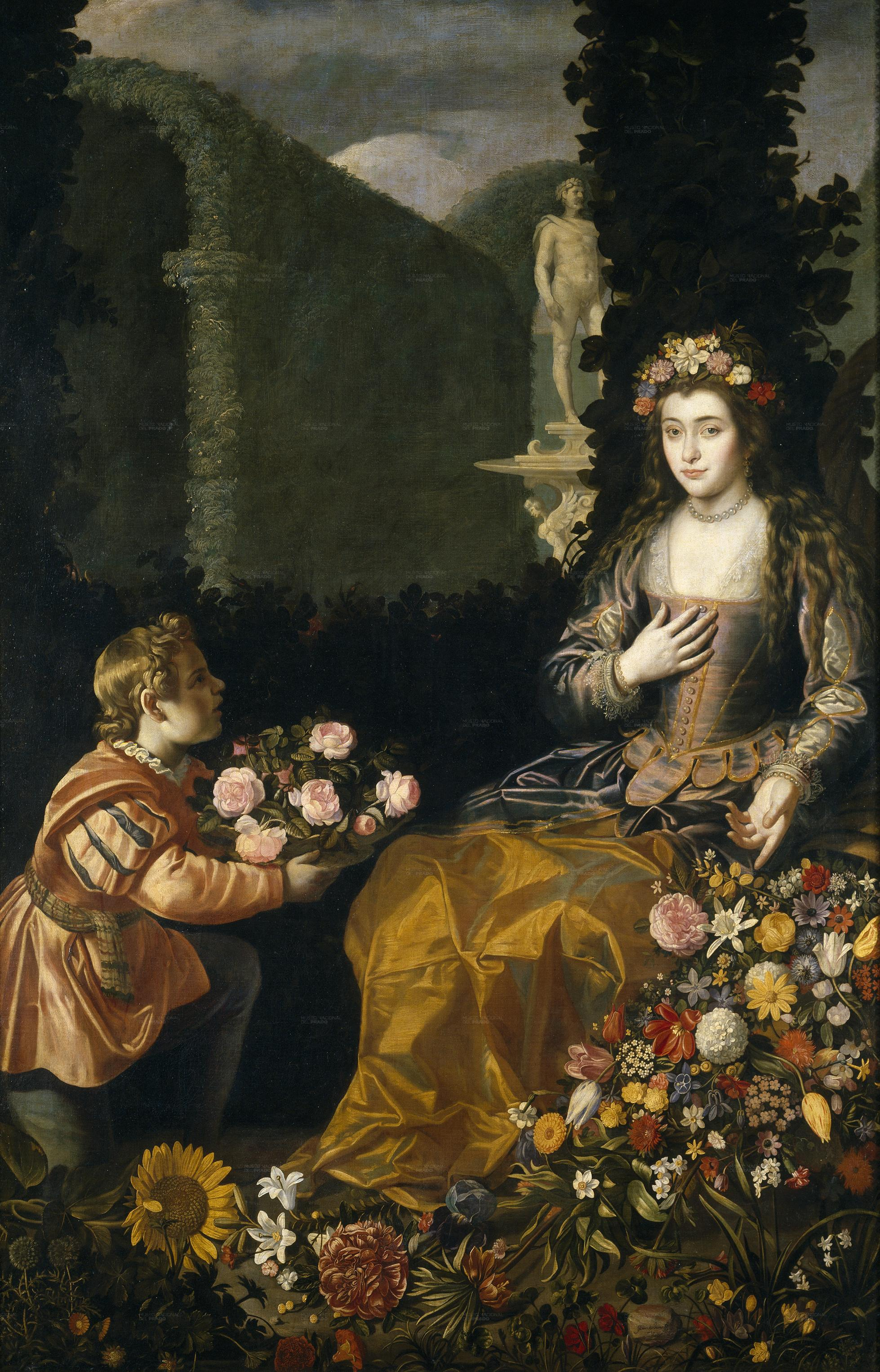
Offering to Flora, 1627 Museo del Prado, Madrid

Juan van der Hamen was also a pioneer in the field of flower painting. Van der Hamen probably began painting floral arrangements in response to the flower pieces of Flemish artists, such as Jan Brueghel the Elder, who were regarded as exemplary masters in the field and whose works were much sought after in Spain.

One good example of his work as a flower painter is his Offering to Flora, a visual poem that parallels the lyric verse of his time, in which he united his skills as portraitist and flower painter to produce one of the most beautiful paintings of the allegory of spring. The large canvas, painted in 1627, shows the goddess of the flowers seated besides a cornucopia of spring flowers. The painting adopts a Flemish compositional type and reveals an interest in the play of light on iridescent fabrics that probably derived in the style of Juan Bautista Maino. The offering to Flora and the pair of paintings Still Life with a Vase of Flowers and a Dog and Still Life with a Vase of Flowers and a Puppy formed part of the interior decoration of Jean de Croy's palace in Madrid. Jean de Croy, conde de Solre and Diego Mexia, marqués de Leganés, were Van der Hamen's greatest patrons.

Juan Van der Hamen died in Madrid on 28 March 1631, at only thirty-five years old. His paintings are still exhibited today in leading European and American museums.

In 2006 The Royal Palace of Madrid and the Dallas, Meadows Museum of Art held the exhibition: Juan van der Hamen y León and the Court of Madrid, gathering Van der Hamen's paintings from Museums around the World and bringing his work to the limelight.

== Still Lifes ==
Van der Hamen is most known today as a skilled still life painter of the Spanish Golden Age, but during his lifetime he was known by his peers for his versatility—his ability to paint portraits, allegories, landscapes, flower paintings, and large-scale works for churches and convents.

The still life, which had often been considered a minor genre, flourished throughout the 17th and 18th centuries. In Spain, this particular subject matter was termed Bodegón and depicted in an austere gloomy style (tenebrismo). Van der Hamen was considered as the greatest Spanish still life painter of the seventeenth century, when that form was revived as a worthy subject in and of itself rather than as an adjunct to a symbolic or narrative work.

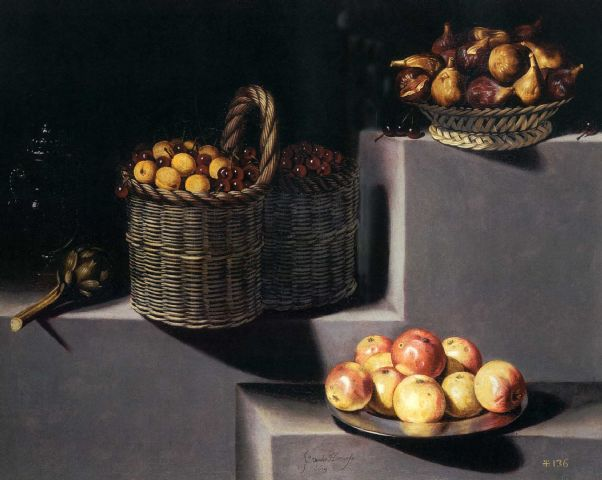
Still life with artichokes, figs peaches and apples, 1627

Van der Hamen's still lifes are painted in a markedly Flemish style, but they reflect the strong influence of those painted at the beginning of the seventeenth century in Toledo by Juan Sánchez Cotán, in which fruits and vegetables are often shown suspended from a window frame or arrange along a ledge. Van der Hamen adapted Sánchez Cotán's compositional style to the conditions of cosmopolitan life in Madrid, using more elaborate objects and foods compositions such as imported Venetian crystals and ceramic vessels along a simple shelf. The objects are silhouetted against a dark background and caught in a powerful light. Their regular, zigzag arrangements and the strong shadows falling on the shelf result in a placid sense of space that is heightened by the impression given by the wafers extending beyond the edge of the shelf towards the viewer.

From 1626 onwards, Van der Hamen made his still lifes more varied and complex than his early ones by placing objects on different levels. This type of composition seems to have originated in Rome during the early 1620s and is seen in works attributed to Tomasso Salini and Agostino Verrocchi. However, van der Hamen's use of this scheme differs from that of the Roman painters, who liked to scatter a profusion of inanimate objects over the surface. Van der Hamen drastically reduces the number of elements and arranges the remainder into exquisitely balanced, asymmetrical compositions, strongly lit in the Spanish manner. This allows him to concentrate on the rendering of each individual object and thus to enhance the sensation of corporeality and texture. Juan van der Hamen still lifes exerted a great influence in his contemporaries like Francisco and Juan de Zurbarán, father and son and in later painters as Antonio Ponce and Juan Arellano.

One of the features of Van der Hamen's still life painting for which he was best known lay in the depiction of expensive luxury glassware, such as the pieces represented here.

Concerned simply with the harmonious arrangement of objects and the accurate representation of texture and light, Van der Hamen arranged the objects represented in geometrical compositions, circles and spheres play. In contrast with the geometric severity of the setting, the artist arranged the objects on stepped stone ledges, thus varying their distances from the light source. The objects represented, fruits vegetables, wood, terracotta, and crystal are masterfully described. He carefully calculated the distribution of color that casts a shadow and at the same time, reflects the light. The calculated red in various tones weaves the forms into a harmonious whole whose simplicity, at first glance, belies its careful structure.

Other Spanish Museums own interesting works by Van der Hamen besides the pieces from The Prado. The Real Academia de Bellas Artes de San Fernando owns an ensemble of six paintings, one of them a portrait and other attributed. The Thyssen-Bornemisza Museum preserves a piece Still Life with Porcelain and Sweets. The Museum Cerralbo also in Madrid houses another painting, Bowl of Peaches. The Granada Fine Arts Museum and the Asturias Fine Arts Museum also own one piece each.

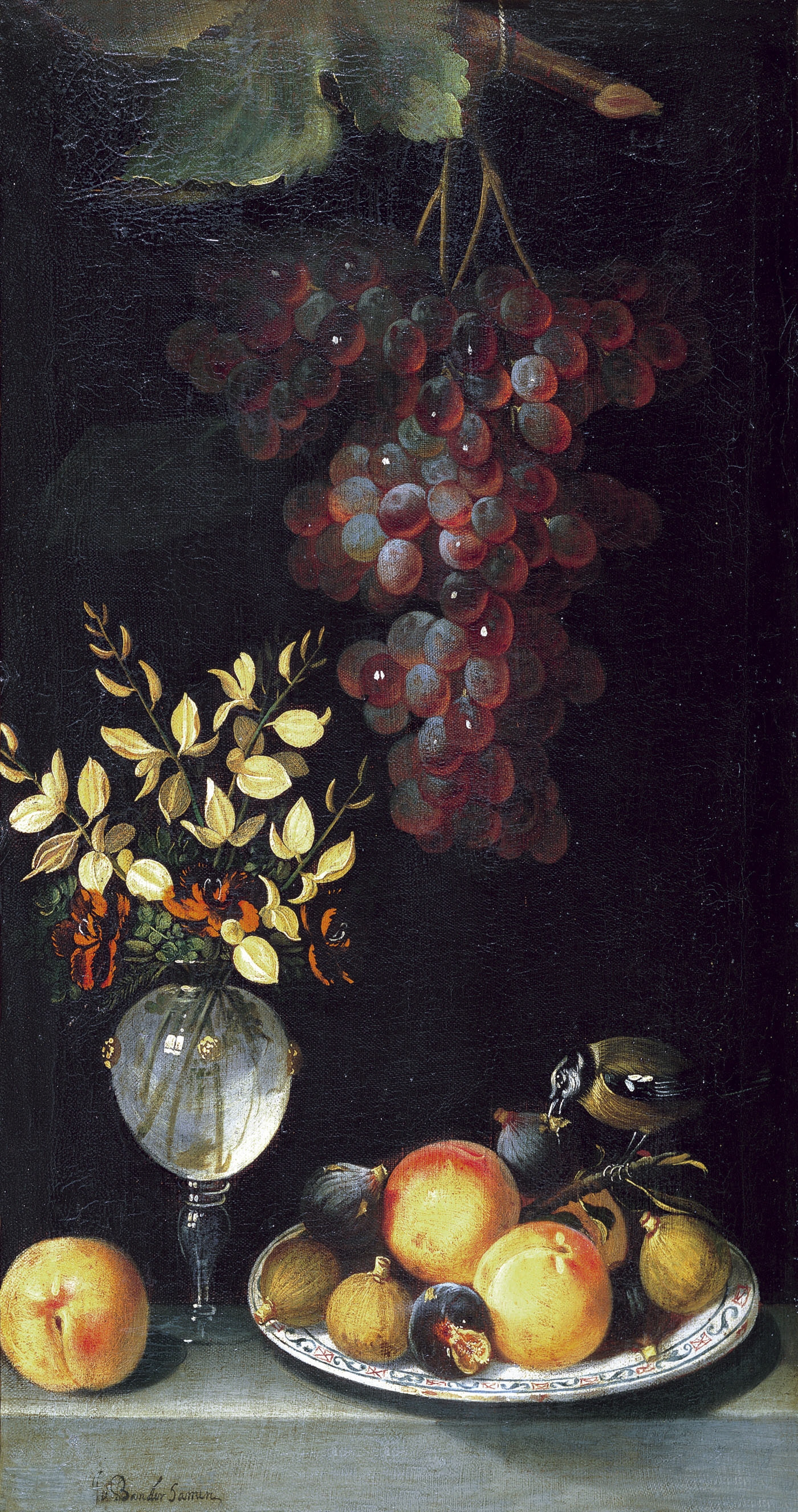
Vase and Fruit bowl. Real Academia de Bellas Artes de San Fernando. Madrid

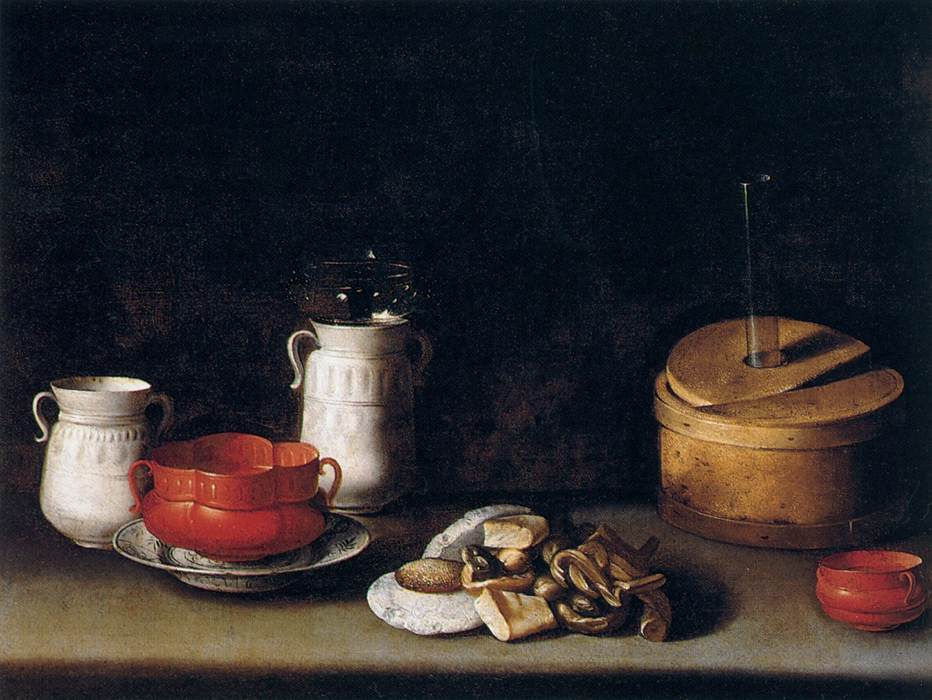
Still Life with Porcelain and Sweets. Thyssen-Bornemisza Museum, Madrid.

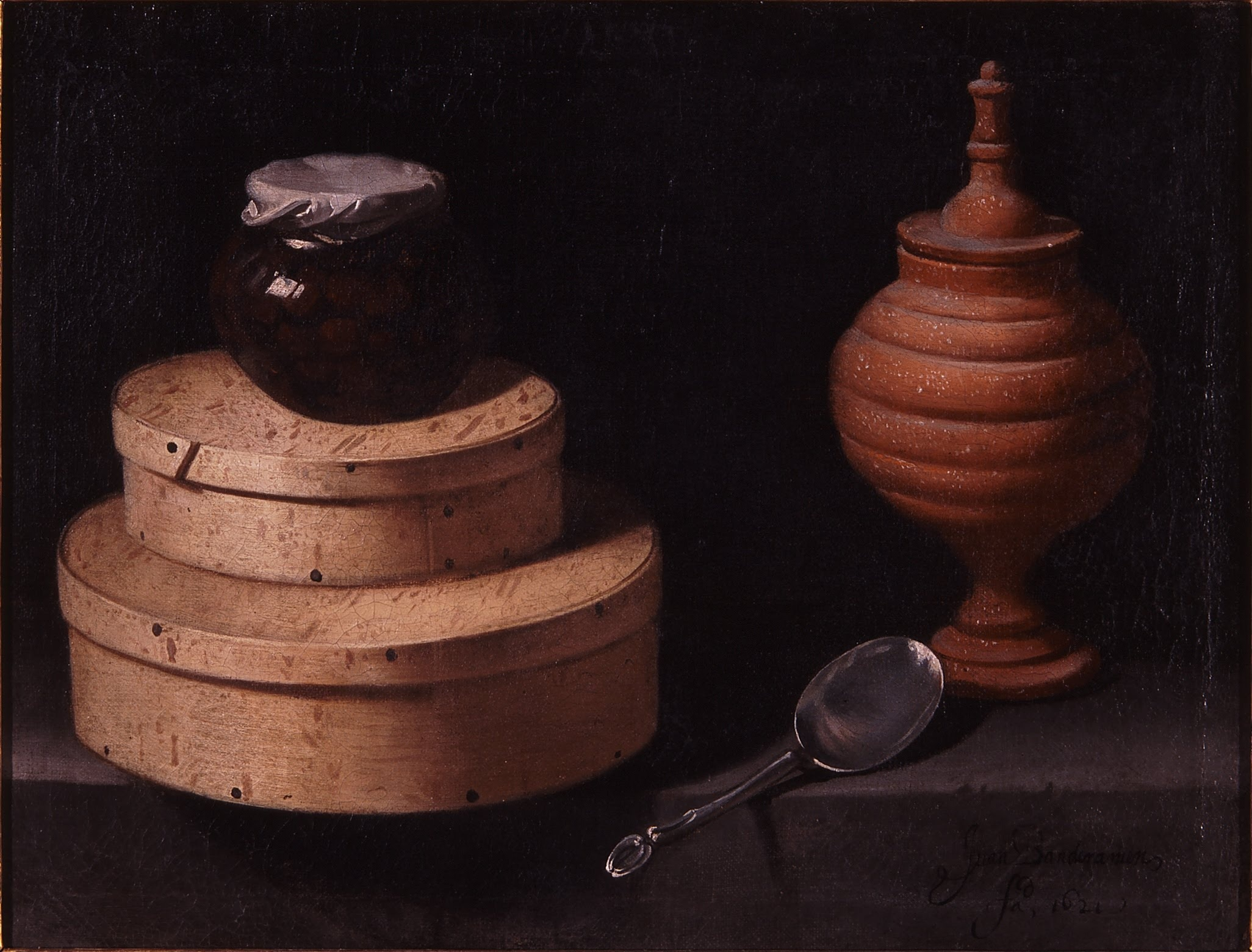
Still life with Candy boxes. Museo de Bellas Artes de Granada. Granada.

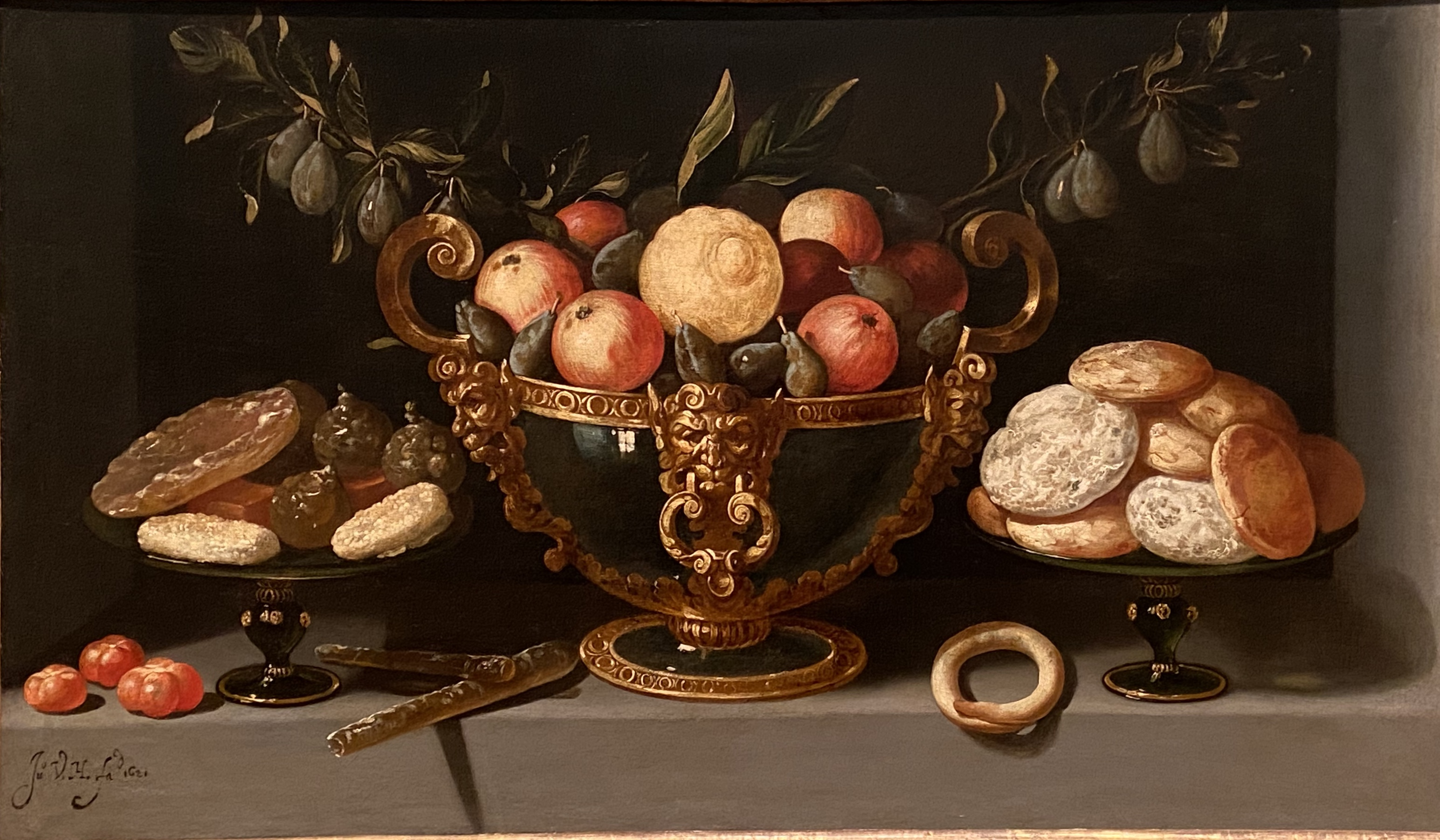
Still life in the Kunstmuseum Basel

== Bibliography ==
- Bendiner, Keneth: Food in Painting: From the Renaissance to the Present. Reaktion Books, 2004. ISBN 1-86189-213-6
- Jordan, William B.: Juan Van der Hamen y León & the Court of Madrid, Dallas, Meadows Museum of Art Catalogue, Yale University Press, 2005. ISBN 84-7120-387-1
- Lopez Rey, Jose Luis: Veláquez: Painter of Painters. Cologne: Taschen, 1999. ISBN 3-8228-6533-8
