= San Esteban, Valencia =

St. Stephen's Church
- Iglesia de San Esteban
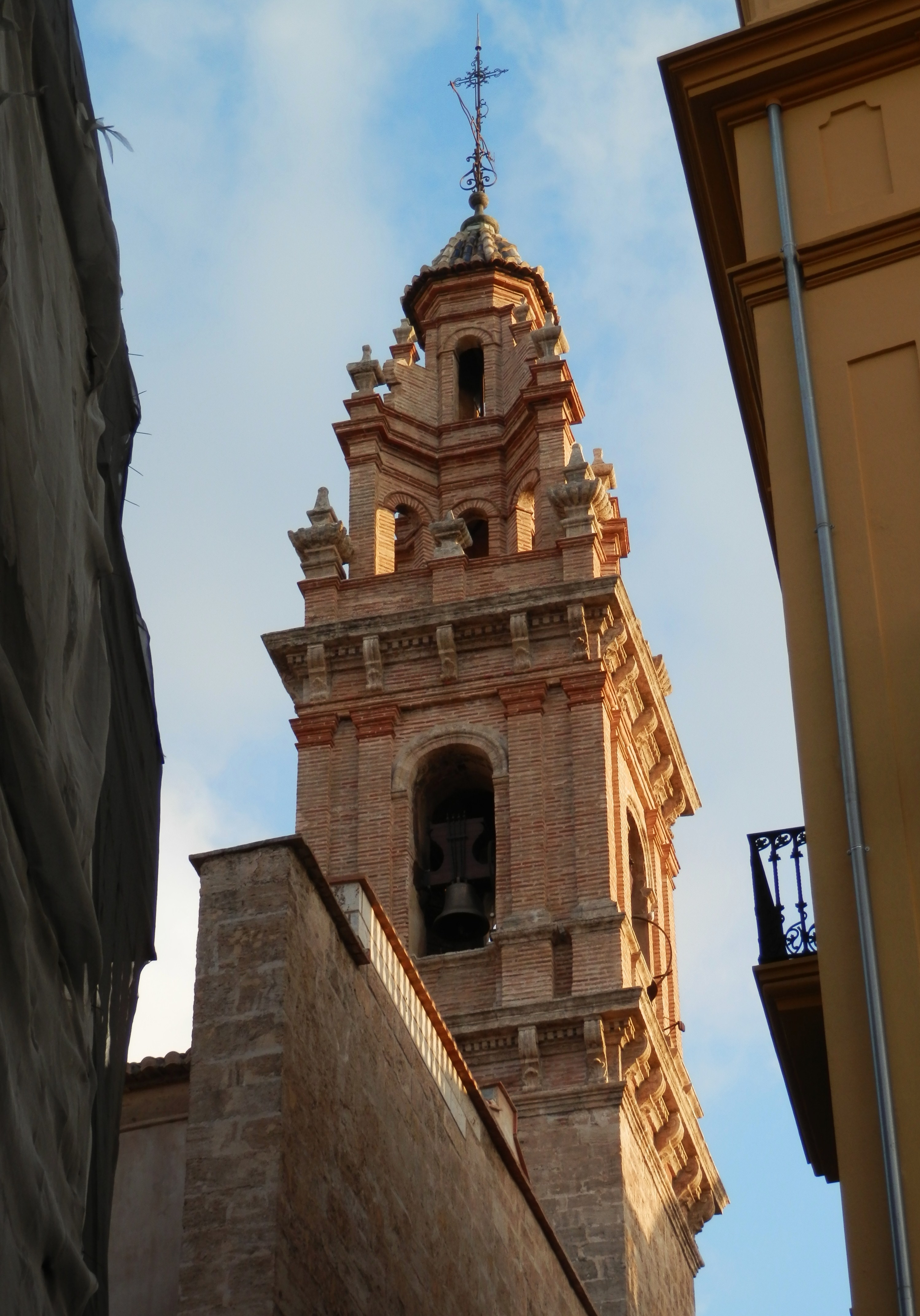
- View of the bell tower
- St. Stephen's Church
- 39°28′34.07″N 0°22′23.37″W
- Location: Valencia
- Address: Plaza de San Esteban, 2
- Country: Spain
- Denomination: Catholic Church

History
- Dedication: Saint Stephen

Architecture
- Architect(s): Juan Bautista Pérez Castiel, Jerónimo Negret, Guillem Roca, José Gomar, Francesc Anton, Pedro Arnal, etc.
- Style: Baroque; Neoclassical; Renaissance

Administration
- Archdiocese: Valencia

St. Stephen's Church (Spanish: Iglesia de San Esteban; Valencian: Església de Sant Esteve) is a Catholic parish church located in the Plaça de Sant Esteve in the city of Valencia, Valencian Community, Spain.

== History ==
St. Stephen's is one of the oldest churches in Valencia. It is built in the Gothic style on the site of a mosque that stood in the city when it was under Muslim rule. It is a rather small church, not far from Valencia Cathedral.

According to one legend the site was that of an old Roman temple dedicated to Hercules. St. Stephen's was the notaries' church. Saint Vincent Ferrer (1350–1419) and Saint Luis Bertrán (1526–1581) were baptized here.

The Last Supper, along with The Martyrdom of Saint Stephen and other scenes from the saint's life painted around 1562 by Juan de Juanes, formed the main altarpiece. They are now in the Museo del Prado.

The main church is open on Sundays and Holy Days of Obligation; the chapel is open daily for mass.

== Gallery ==
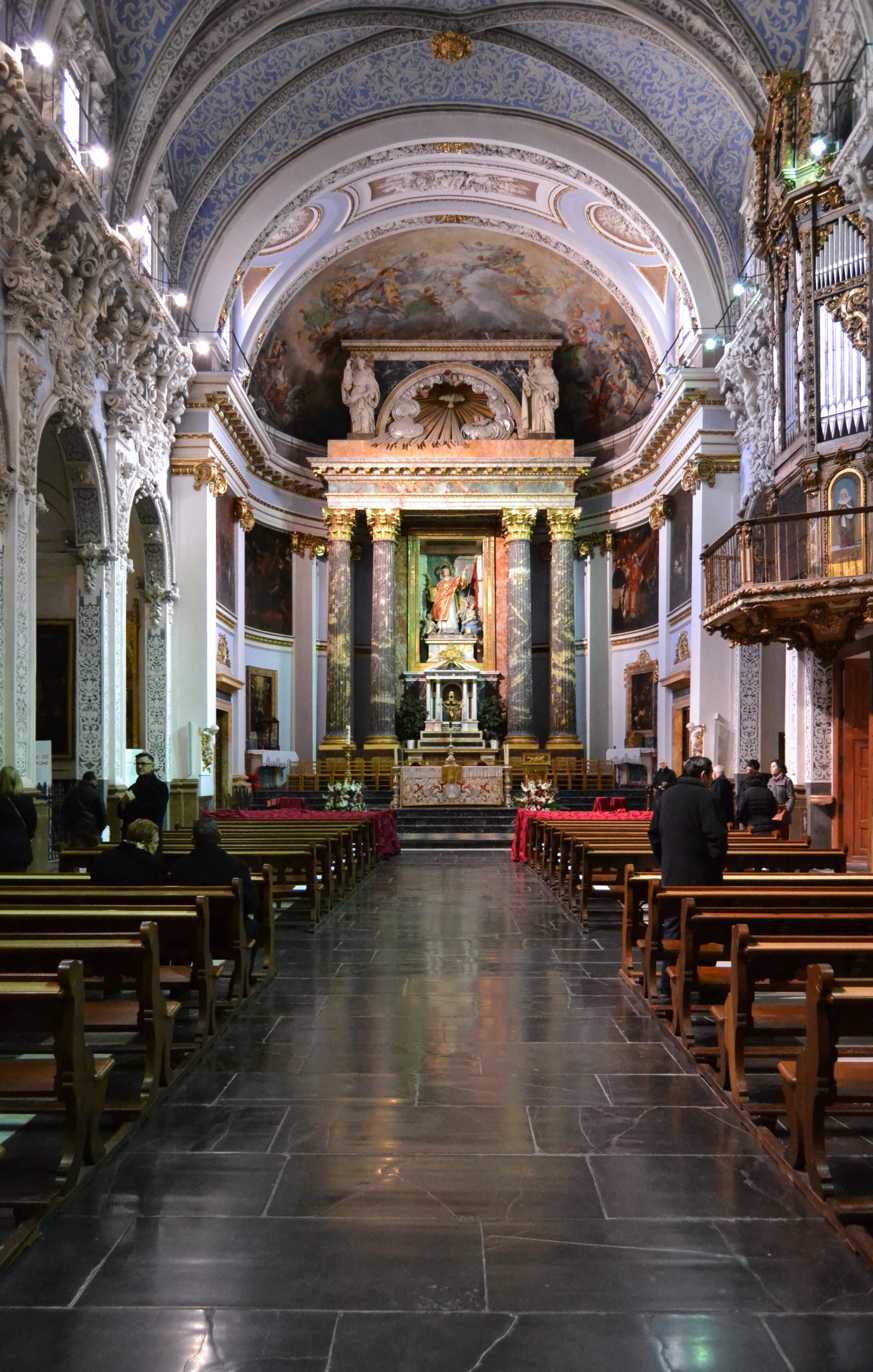
Interior

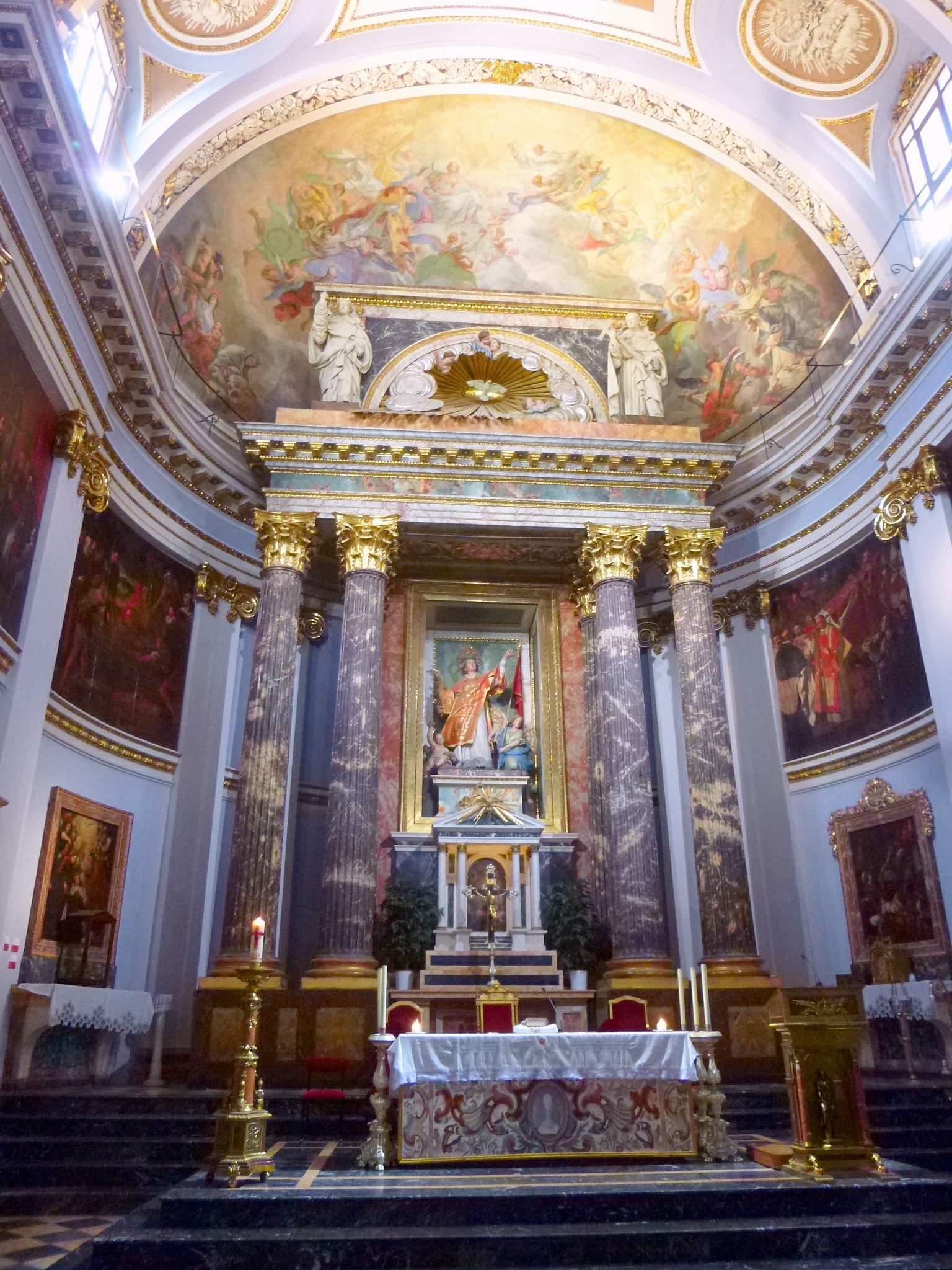
Main altar

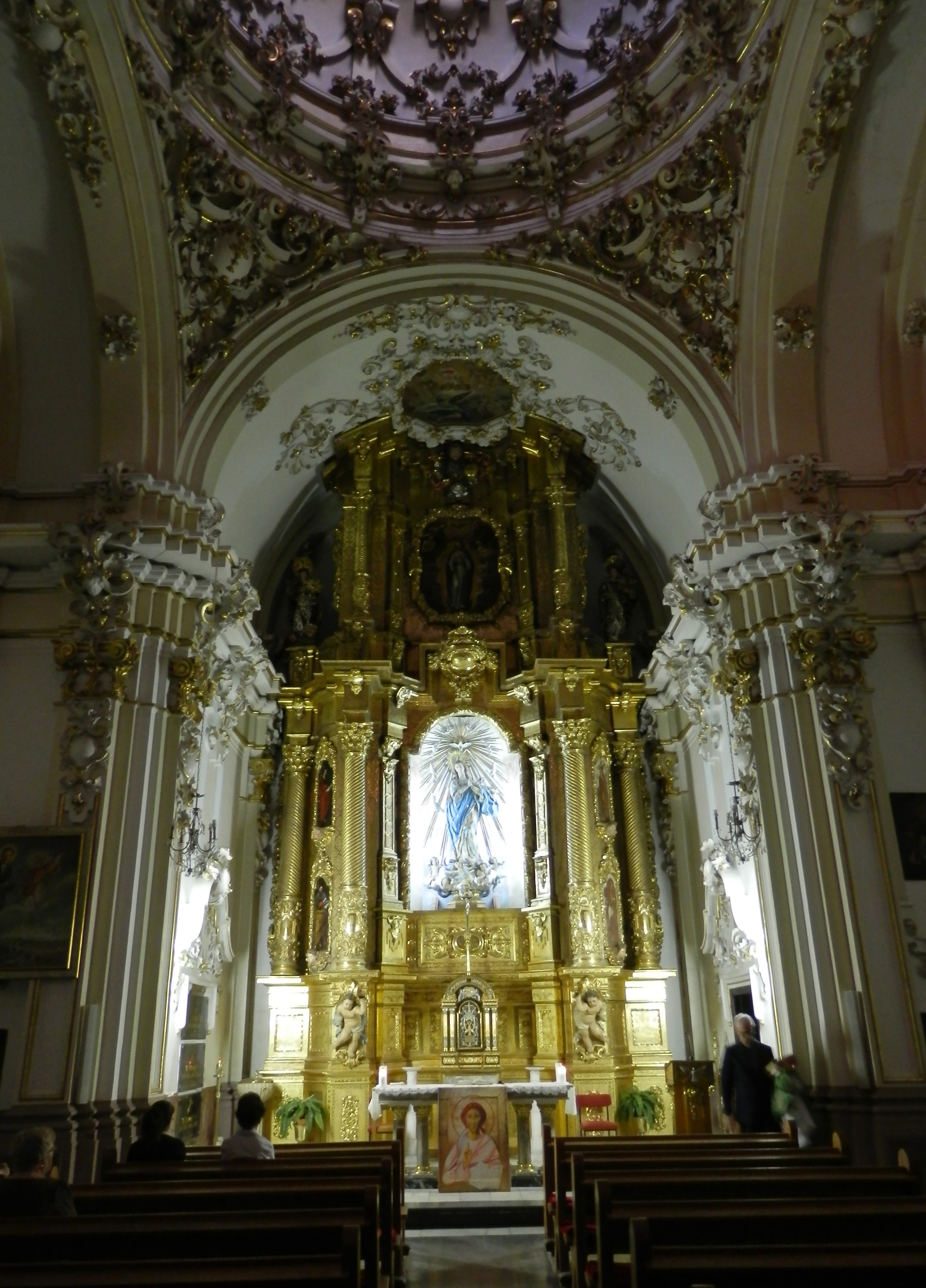
Communion Chapel

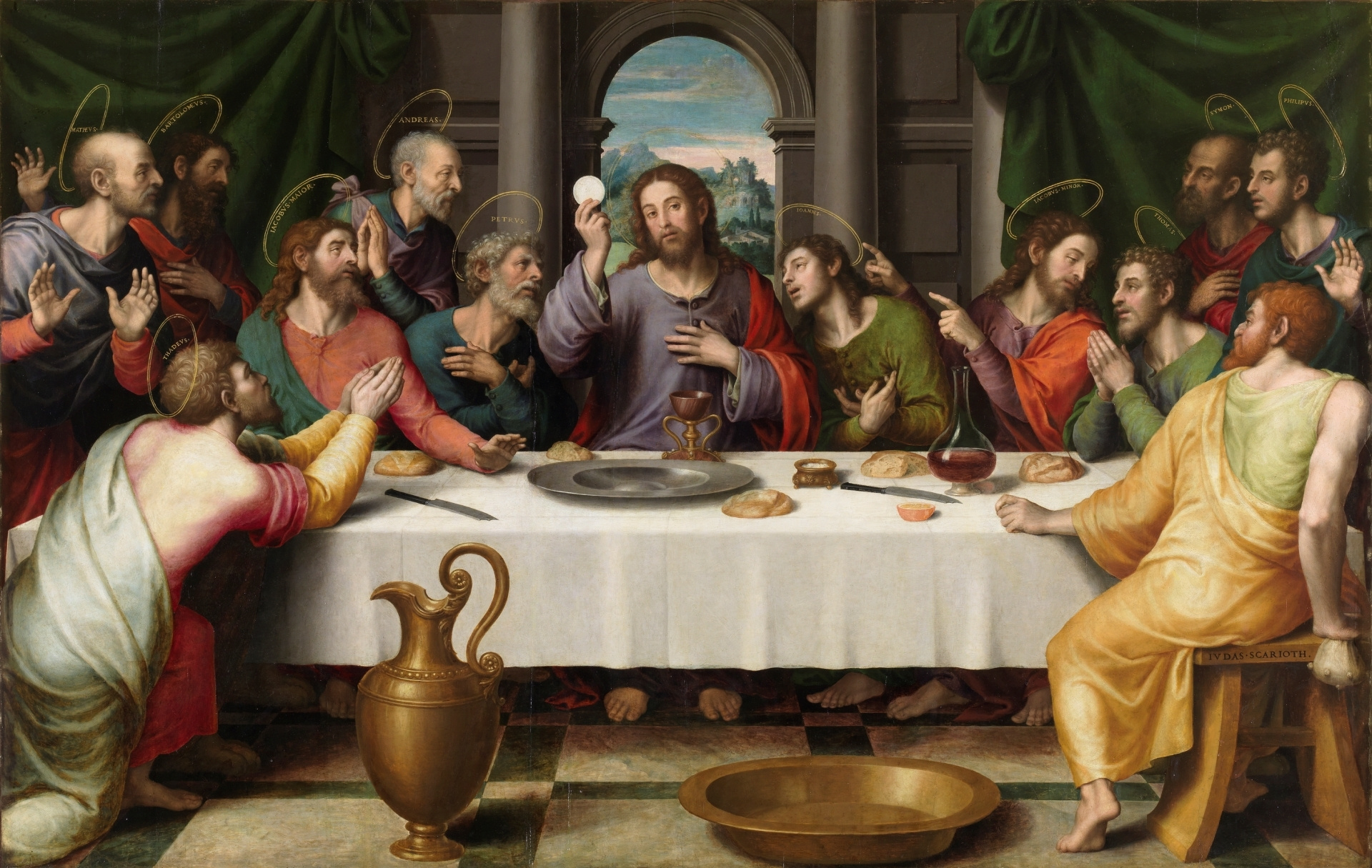
The Last Supper by Juan de Juanes

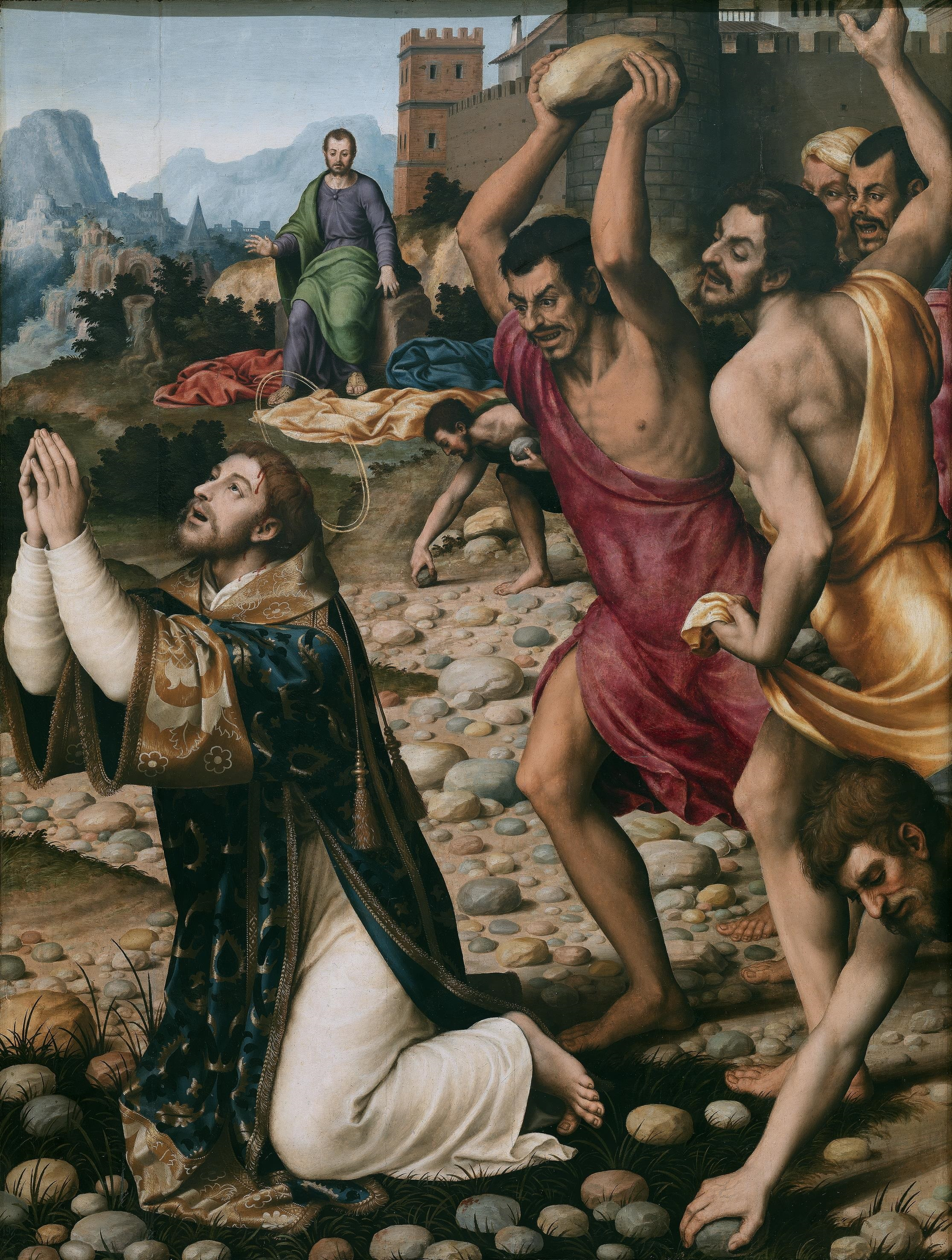
Martyrdom of Saint Stephen by Juan de Juanes
