= Agostino Verrocchi =

Italian painter

Agostino Verrocchi (1586–1659) was an Italian painter, mainly depicting still-life subjects during the Baroque period. He was active from 1619 to 1636 and mainly in Rome. Verrocchi, alongside other Roman artists like Tomasso Salini, is known for pioneering a new type of still life which placed objects on different levels, to create depth and complexity.

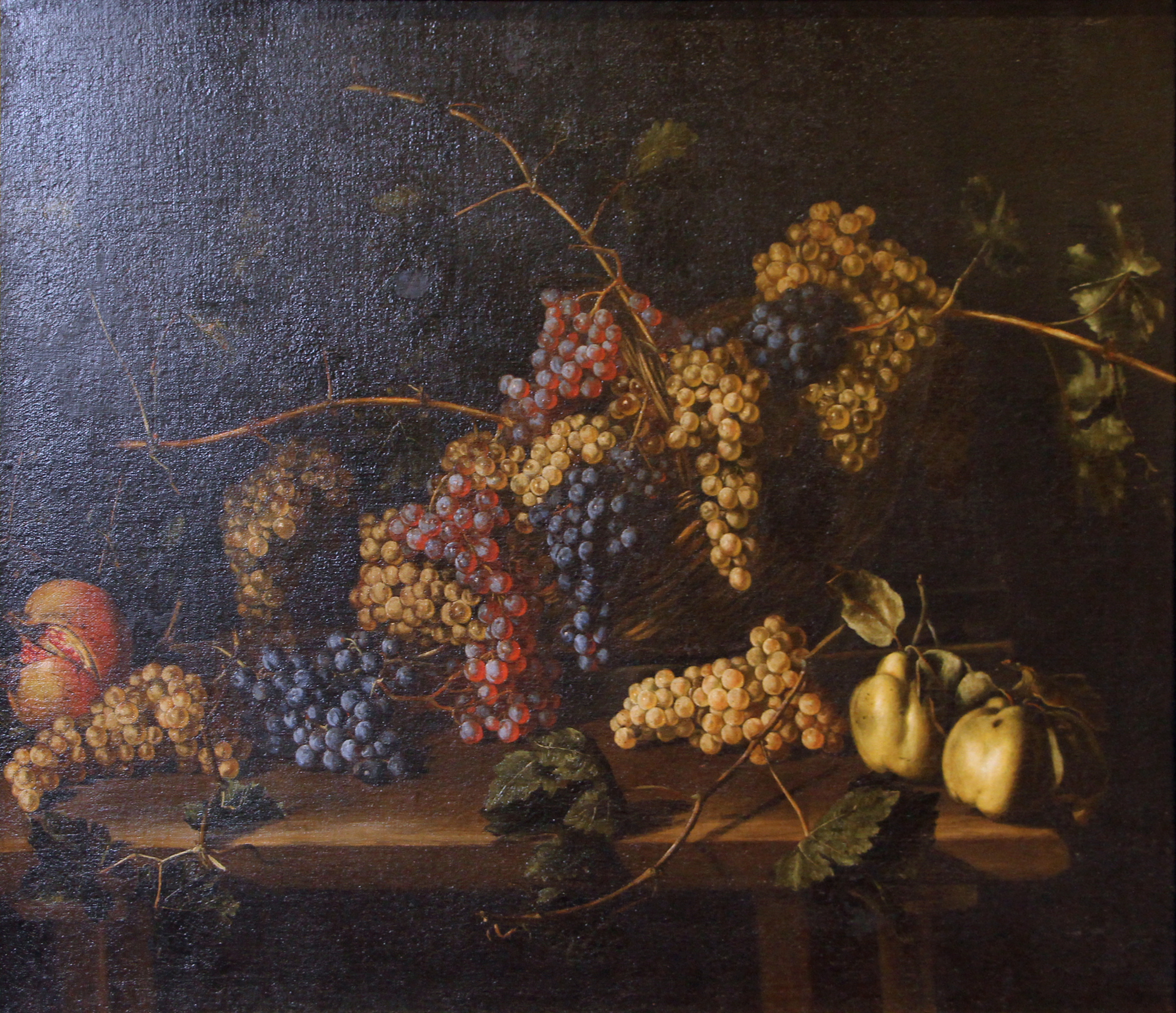
Still-Life with Grapes, Pears, and Pomegranate, Poggio a Caiano, Medici Villa

He has been featured in two exhibitions. The first was titled La Natura morta al tempo di Caravaggio, Roma at the Musei Capitolini during December 1995 to April 1996. The second, L'incantesimo dei sensi was at the Museo Accorsi - Ometto of Turin in 2005, where he was displayed alongside relative contemporaries such as Maestro Acquavella, Pietro Paolo Bonzi, Fede Galizia, Panfilo Nuvolone, Giuseppe Recco, and Giambattista Ruoppolo.
