= Juan Fernández el Labrador =

Spanish painter

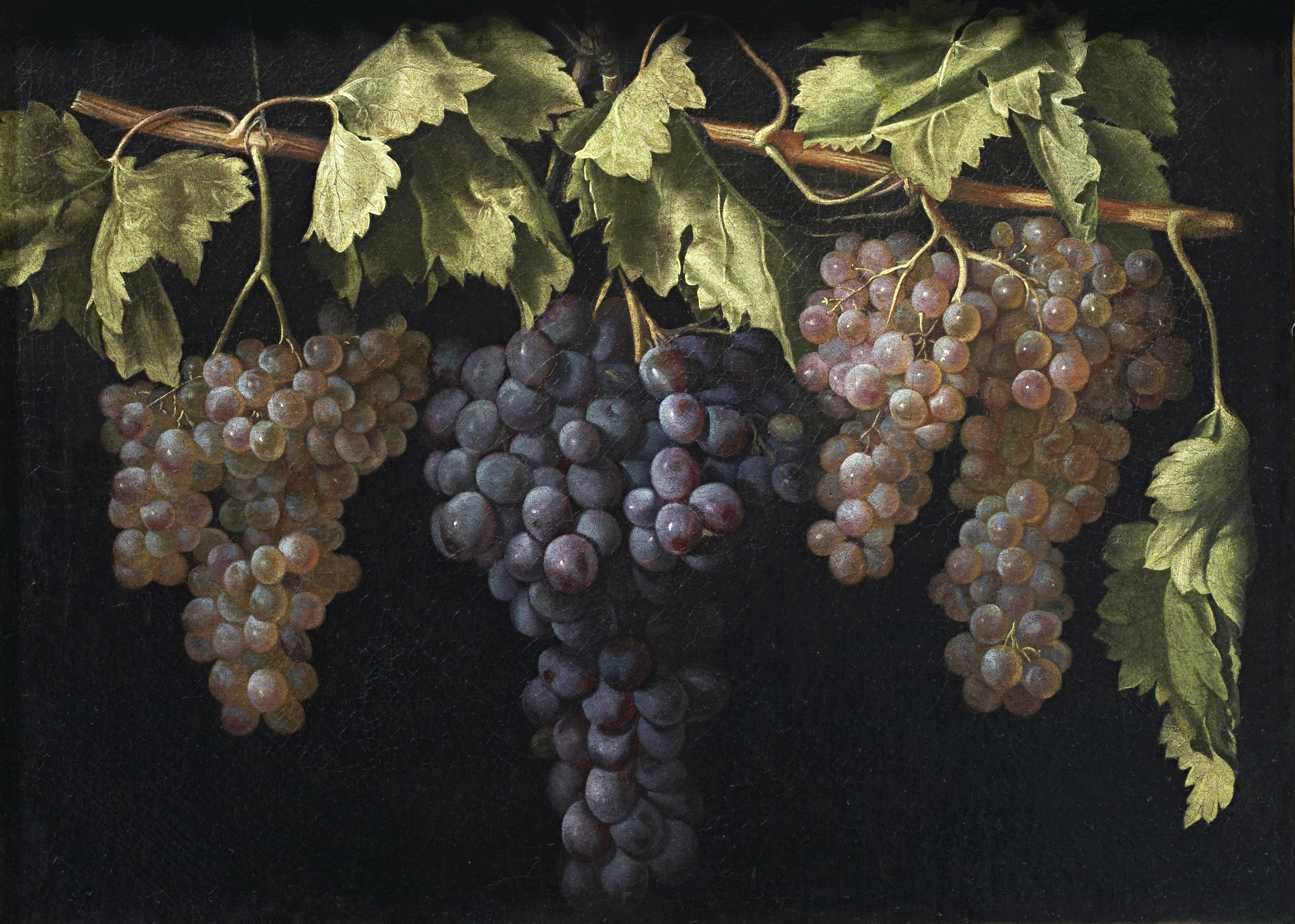
Still life with four bunches of grapes by Juan Fernández, el Labrador, Museo del Prado, 1630-1635

Juan Fernández, nicknamed El Labrador, was a Spanish Baroque painter active between 1629 and 1636, specializing in still life painting.

== Biography ==
Fernández was an enigmatic painter, who lived away from the court and turned to painting flowers and fruits, especially grapes as inventories collecting paintings of the time, a task with which he reached international reputation. Art historian Antonio Palomino, devoted a few lines to "Juan Labrador Painter Illustrious", supposing him to be a disciple of Luis de Morales and who died in Madrid, very old, around 1600.

Sir Arthur Hompton, secretary to Sir Francis Cottington, British diplomat at the court of Madrid, evident in his correspondence (1629-1635) was requested to acquire works of the painter, a task not without difficulty. Hopton stated in February 1635 that he had encouraged Fernández on occasion to paint flowers, and that "If they are as good as his fruits, his lordship must send for some of them". At least two works of the painter came to Charles I of England, one of which, Still life with grapes, quince and nuts, still belongs to the British Royal Collection, which appeared in 1639 and inventoried. This oil painting, along with a vase in private collection signed "the farmer Ju ° fernandez 1636" are the only works that can confidently be considered from his hand, from which it has been possible to establish a style and attribute new works. Documentation shows Still life with four bunches of grapes for sale pieças de Uvas Francis Cottington, 1st Baron Cottington, British ambassador in Madrid between 1629 and 1631.

Fernández was Caravaggisti in style. He put his objects on black backgrounds and used light directed to those objects, chiaroscuro style, described with almost Flemish detail, emphasizing its humble appearance. His international standing was completed with the arrival of one of his paintings to the French court to Anne of Austria, sister of Philip IV of Spain and wife of Louis XIII of France.

In addition to the works with grapes, there were references to other fruits and flowers and even a landscape ('Payssico three quarters of high and average width Bara bunches of Ubas and some apricots (...) Labrador ") in the collection of Francisco Gonzalez Cossio, knight of Santiago, according to the inventory that it was made in 1671, which seems to indicate, despite the almost total absence of spatial references in his works known in his painting was not confined to the still lifes. In the meticulous inventory of the New Palace, in 1747, it is mentioned a philosopher portrait attribution to Labrador, which is undoubtedly the Philosopher writing, from the royal collection deposited by the Museo del Prado at the University of Seville.
