= Marcos Antonio Orellana =

Spanish erudite, jurist, and writer

Marcos Antonio Orellana (1731–1813) was a Spanish erudite, jurist and writer.

== Works ==
In Spanish:

- Valencia antigua y moderna. Historia y descripción de las calles, plazas y edificios de Valencia. No se publicó hasta 1923.
- Catálogo y descripció dels pardals de l' Albufera de València. (sic). (1795).
- Catálogo dels peixos qu'es crien e peixquen en lo mar de València. (sic). (1802).
- Biografía pictórica valentina, o vida de los pintores, arquitectos, escultores y grabadores valencianos. Esta obra la escrita basándose en informaciones directas.
- Historia lúdica, o tratado de los juegos antiguos y modernos, y otras diversiones usadas en varias partes, particularmente en la Ciudad y Reino de Valencia.
- Tratado de la monedas de España y que han corrido en la corona de Aragón, especialmente en Valencia.
- El escudo verdadero antiguo de Valencia: el Dragón.
- Memoria sobre los guadamaciles valencianos.
- Noticia de los instrumentos músicos que se usaban en el Reino de Valencia.
- Memoria sobre los vidrios pintados y modo de crear esta industria en Valencia.
- Noticia sobre la fabricación del azúcar e ingenios que en lo antiguo se conocieron en el Reino de Valencia.
- Efemérides de Valencia.
- Historia del Santo Cáliz.
- Se sabe que fue autor de poemas en lengua autóctona, así como de una compilación de adagios, obras actualmente perdidas.
