= William B. Jordan =

American art historian (1940–2018)

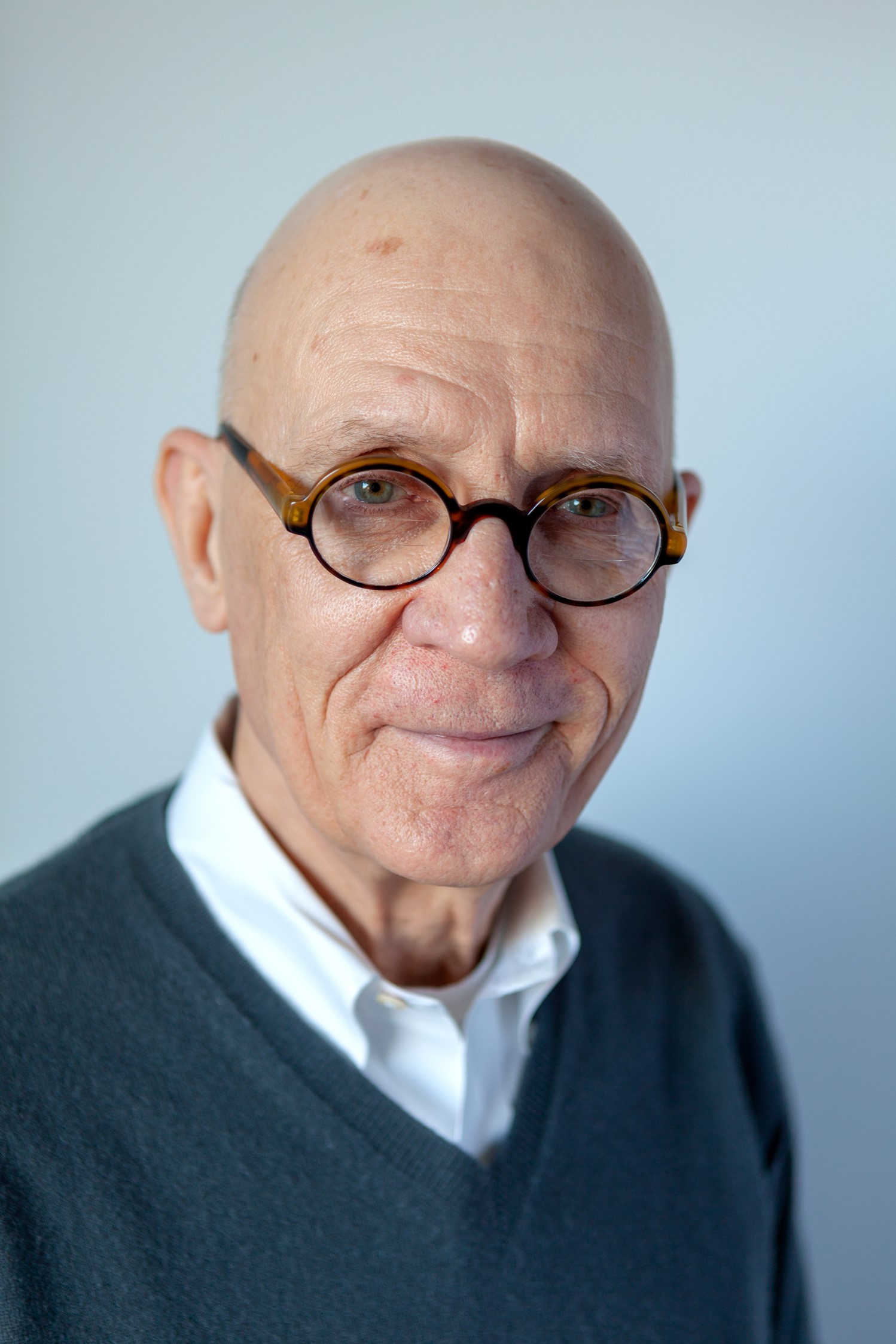
- Jordan around 2011–2013
- Born: May 8, 1940; Nashville, Tennessee, U.S.
- Died: January 22, 2018 (aged 77); Dallas, Texas, U.S.
- Education: Washington and Lee University (BA); Institute of Fine Arts, New York University (MA, PhD)
- Occupation: Art historian
- Years active: 1967–2018
- Known for: Art acquisition, attribution, curation
- Notable work: Spanish Still Life in the Golden Age, 1600–1650 (1985); Spanish Still Life from Velázquez to Goya (1995); Juan van der Hamen y León & the Court of Madrid (2005)
- Spouse: Robert Dean Brownlee

William Bryan Jordan Jr. (May 8, 1940 – January 22, 2018) was an American art historian who facilitated acquisitions, curated exhibitions, and authored publications on Spanish artists and still life paintings, particularly from the Golden Age.

Born and raised in Nashville, Tennessee, and later in San Antonio, Texas, Jordan studied at Washington and Lee University and the Institute of Fine Arts of New York University. He became the founding director of the Meadows Museum at Southern Methodist University in 1967. With Algur H. Meadows' financial support, Jordan helped the museum acquire around 75 artworks and is credited for turning its collection into one of the most prominent collections of Spanish art outside Spain. He was also the chair of fine arts at the Meadows School of the Arts and an adjunct curator of the Dallas Museum of Art.

After leaving the Meadows Museum, Jordan served as the deputy director and chief curator of the Kimbell Art Museum from 1981 to 1990, and worked on several still life exhibitions and publications, including Spanish Still Life in the Golden Age, 1600–1650 (1985) and Spanish Still Life from Velázquez to Goya (1995). Jordan's research of over 40 years on Juan van der Hamen culminated in his 2005 book Juan van der Hamen y León & the Court of Madrid. He was on the board of various museums and art institutes, and was made an honorary trustee of the Prado Museum in 2017.

Known for his connoisseurship, Jordan worked as an acquisition and attribution expert, and maintained a private collection with his husband Robert Dean Brownlee. Jordan purchased a then-misattributed painting — that he believed was by Diego Velázquez — for £1,000 in 1988. After Velázquez's attribution was confirmed, he donated the painting, then titled Portrait of Philip III (1623–31) and valued at around US$6 million, to the Prado Museum in 2016. Following his death, several artworks from Jordan and Brownlee's collection were bequeathed to various museums by their estate.

== Early life ==
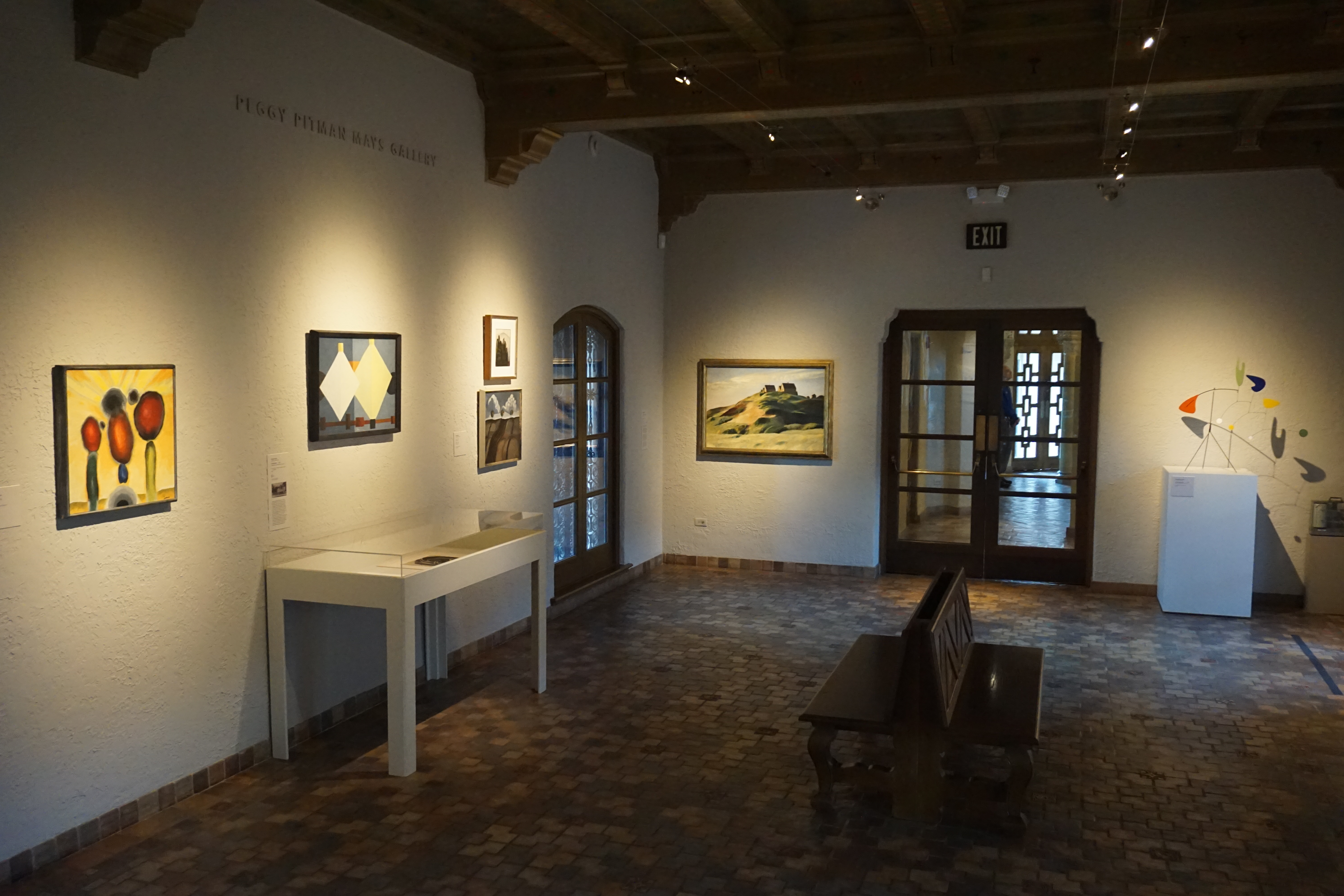
Jordan became interested in art while working at the McNay Art Museum.

William Bryan Jordan Jr. was born on May 8, 1940, in Nashville, Tennessee, to Dixie Owen Jordan and William Bryan Jordan. He had three sisters: Ettie Lu Jordan Soard, Frances Jordan Hearn-Rigney, and Sue Jordan Rodarte. They relocated to San Antonio, Texas in 1945, where he attended Alamo Heights High School. Over the summers, he worked at the McNay Art Museum and was mentored by its first director John Palmer Leeper.

Jordan graduated cum laude in 1962 with a bachelor's degree from Washington and Lee University, and completed his master's and doctorate in the history of Spanish art from the Institute of Fine Arts of New York University in 1964 and 1967, respectively. Under the supervision of the Spanish art historian José López-Rey, Jordan focused on Juan van der Hamen for his doctoral thesis. He spent eleven months evaluating archives in Spain, (Note: Archives Jordan visited included Antiguo Archivo General de Protocolos de Madrid, Archiepiscopal Palace of Alcalá de Henares, Archivo General de Simancas and Granada Cathedral.) and discovered new painting records and biographical details of van der Hamen. (Note: Around 30 paintings attributed to van der Hamen were considered lost before Jordan had begun his research; he was able to list a total of 204 "lost works" from the catalogs he evaluated. Jordan found previously unascertained biographical details such as the genealogy of van der Hamen's family, details of his marriage petition and estate, personal history of his children, and paintings and catalogs found in his studio after his death.) Jordan compiled an illustrated catalog and a monograph on the painter in his two-volume 1967 dissertation, Juan van der Hamen y León. (Note: Volume I contained Jordan's analysis of van der Hamen's biography and paintings, and Volume II listed contents of the documentary sources and the catalog.)

== Career ==
=== 1967–1981: Meadows Museum ===
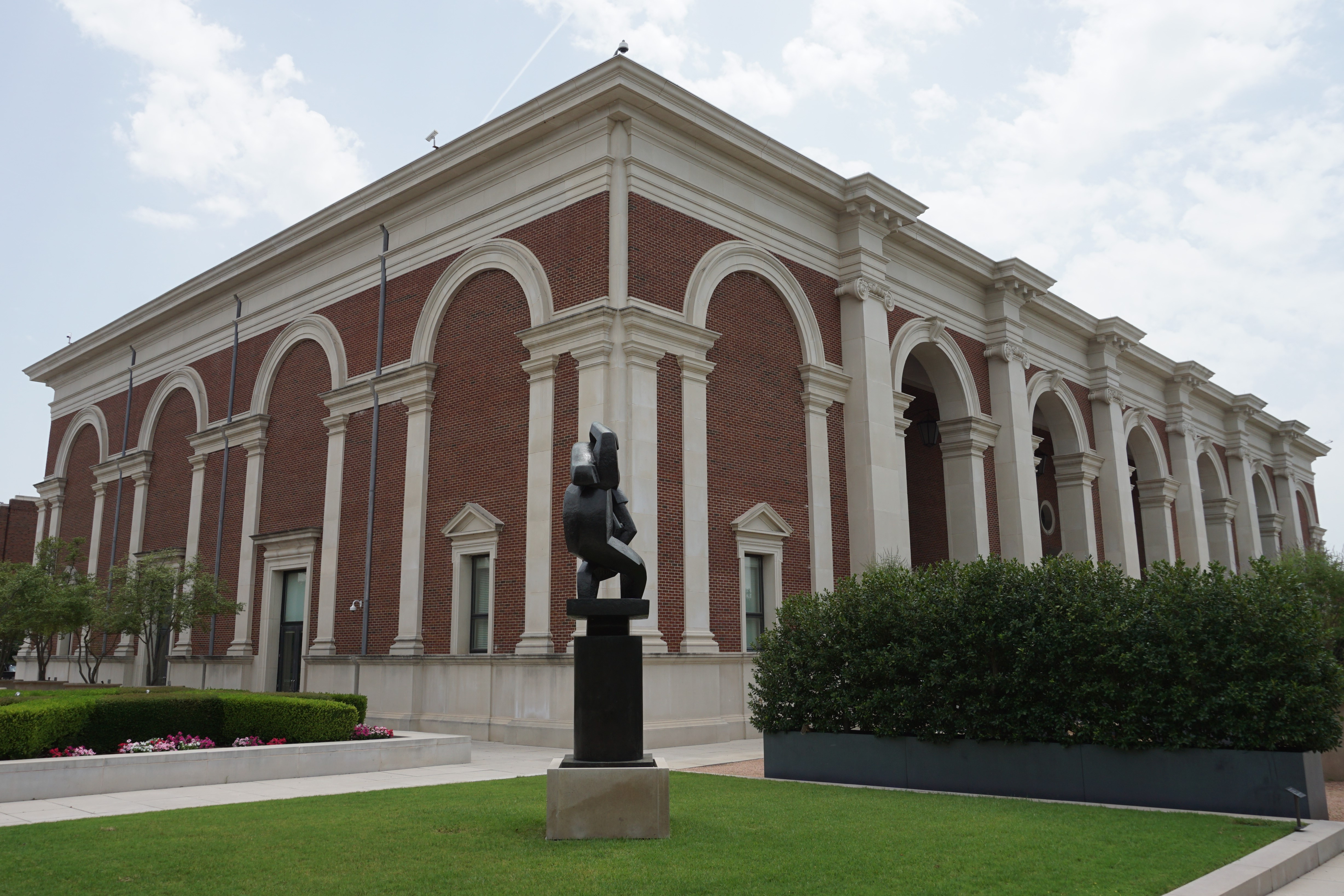
Jordan received an offer to become the director of the Meadows Museum while still a graduate student in 1966.

When Jordan was offered the post of the director of the recently opened Meadows Museum at Southern Methodist University in Dallas, Texas, the museum was struggling with an art scandal that had damaged its reputation; 44 paintings in their collection had turned out to have been forgeries, including counterfeits by Elmyr de Hory. Jordan visited the museum with López-Rey, and concluded that he would have to "essentially build [the collection] from scratch". Algur H. Meadows, the museum's founder and benefactor, pledged over US$1 million (equivalent to US$9.7 million in 2025) to rebuild their Spanish art collection, and Jordan accepted the position.

Jordan became the founding director of the Meadows Museum and chair of fine arts at the Meadows School of the Arts in 1967. The museum closed for a few months, and Jordan began evaluating its collection with help from López-Rey and Diego Angulo Íñiguez. Jordan revamped the collection by auctioning off paintings he deemed insignificant for a museum collection and acquiring new works before the museum reopened; the collection included Yard with Lunatics (1794) by Francisco Goya, and works of Francisco de Zurbarán and Bartolomé Esteban Murillo. In a 1968 Art Journal article, Jordan discussed their recent additions and wrote that the museum had begun an acquisitions program to further expand their collection; he followed up with the 1974 collection catalog, The Meadows Museum: A Visitor's Guide to the Collection.

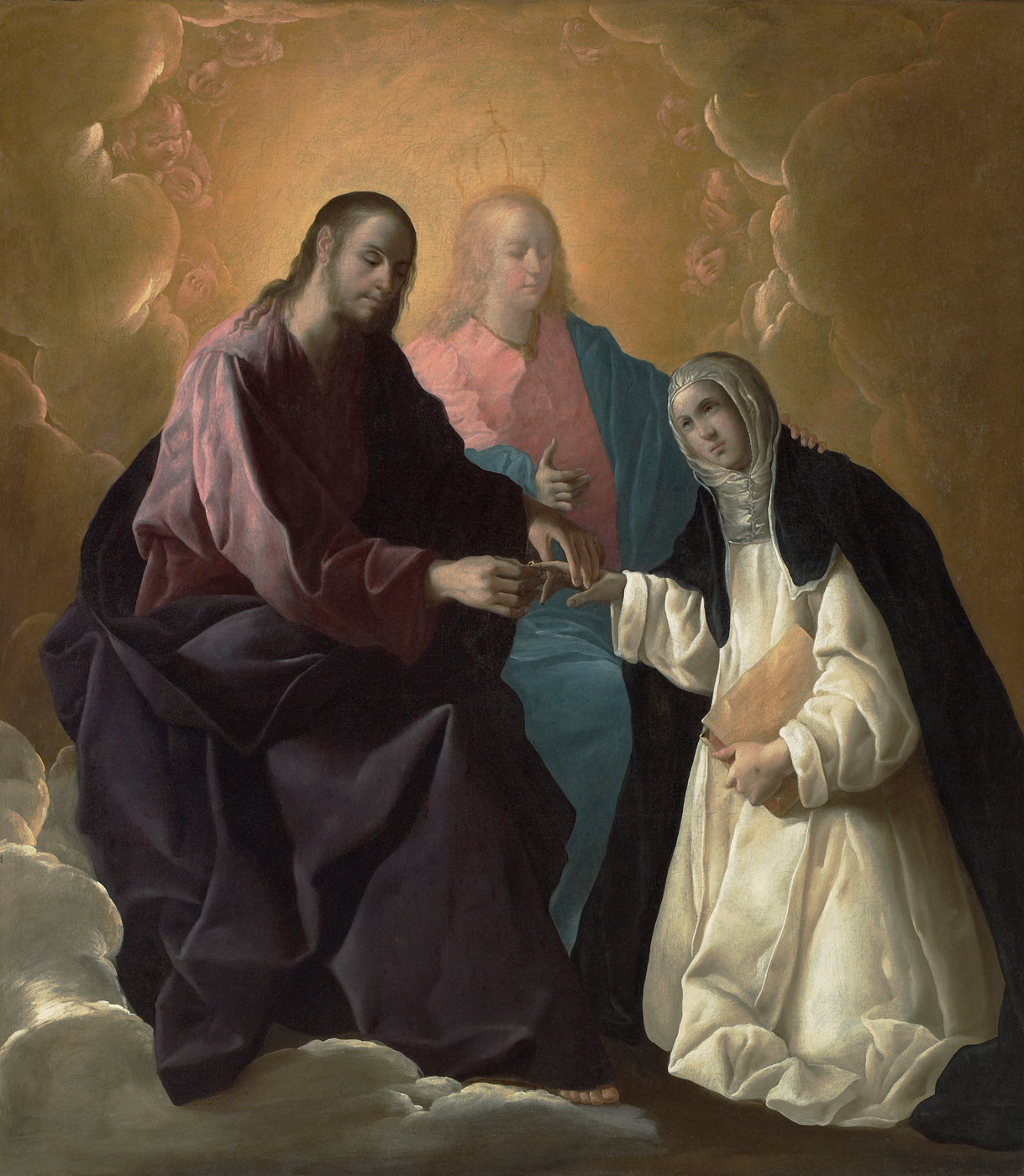
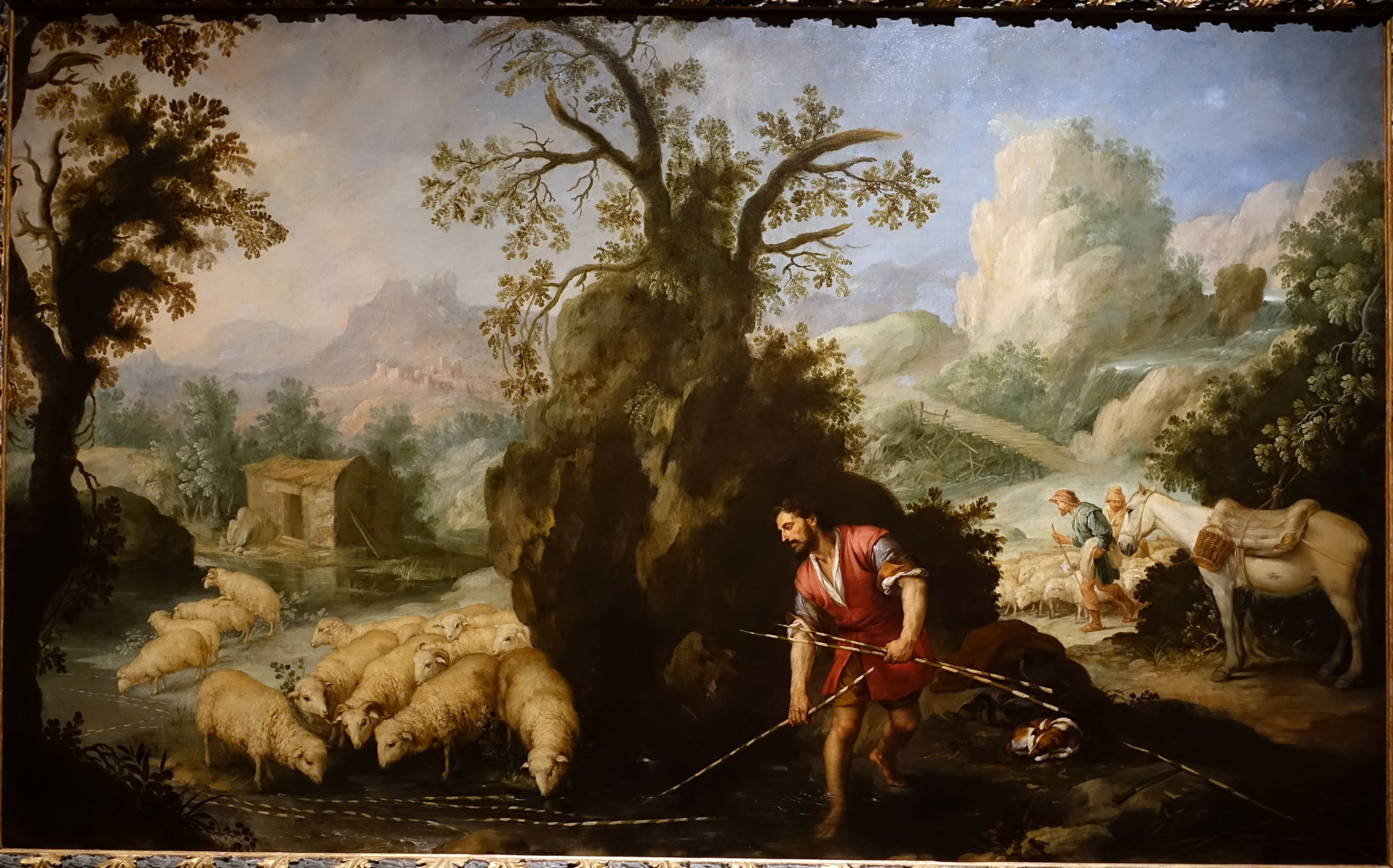
Jordan highlighted the acquisition of paintings such as The Mystical Marriage of St. Catherine (c. 1645; left) by Francisco de Zurbarán and Jacob Laying Peeled Rods Before the Flocks of Laban (c. 1665; right) by Bartolomé Esteban Murillo in the 1968 article.

In 1971–72, Jordan organized an exhibition on a collection of works related to Dennis Hopper, and a postwar art exhibition of works by Andy Warhol, Robert Rauschenberg and Wallace Burnett at the University Gallery of Southern Methodist University. He oversaw Poets of the Cities: New York and San Francisco 1950–65 (1974), an exhibition on international contemporary arts, at the University Gallery and Dallas Museum of Arts. In 1975, Jordan was appointed a full professor at the Meadows School of the Arts, where he taught courses on Spanish art history and connoisseurship.

Jordan was a founding member and general secretary from 1976 to 1978 of the American Society for Hispanic Art Historical Studies. He joined the Dallas Museum of Art as the adjunct curator of European art in 1977, a post he held until 1982. He curated Dallas Collects: Impressionist and Early Modern Masters (1978) for the 75th anniversary of the museum, assembling 115 works from local private collections, and authored its exhibition catalog. In subsequent years, Jordan became a member of the Board of Trustees, and member and chairman of the Committee on Collections of the Dallas Museum of Art.

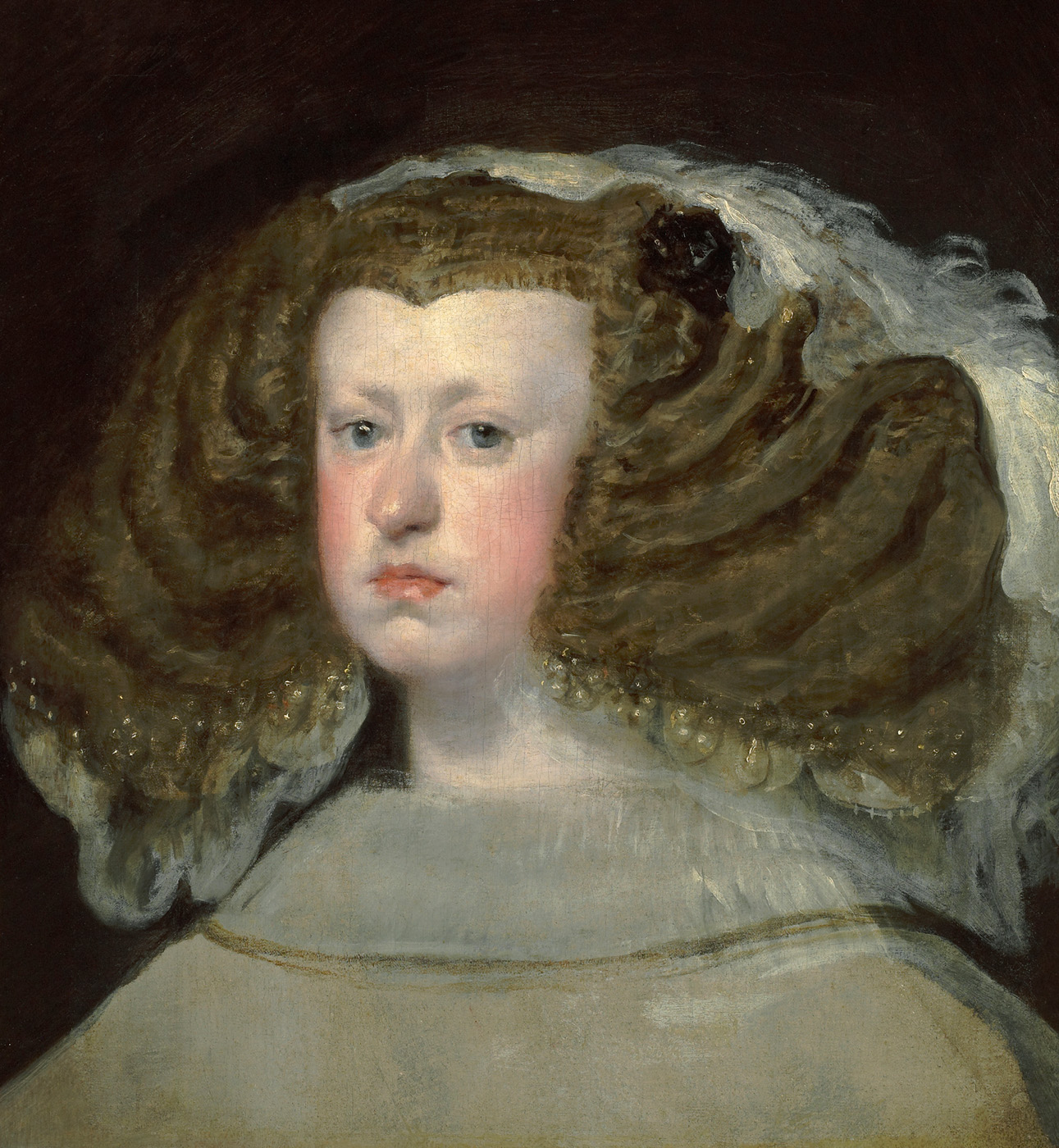
Jordan and Algur H. Meadows' final collaboration was the acquisition of Portrait of Queen Mariana (1656) by Diego Velázquez in 1978.

With Meadows' financial support, Jordan acquired several prominent works at auctions and from art dealers, and significantly expanded the Meadows Museum's collection. The collaboration continued until Meadows' death in a car accident in 1978. Jordan organized 20th Century Sculpture: Mr. and Mrs. Raymond D. Nasher Collection, the first exhibition of Patsy and Raymond Nasher's sculpture collection, at the University Gallery in 1978. He oversaw contemporary art exhibitions Paintings and Drawings by Cy Twombly and Livres d'Artiste by Braque, Matisse, and Picasso from the Collection of the Bridwell Library at the same venue in 1980.

During his tenure, Jordan acquired around 75 artworks, and helped develop the museum's sculpture collection at the "Elizabeth Meadows Sculpture Garden". His acquisitions included works by Diego Velázquez, Francisco de Zurbarán, Jusepe de Ribera and Murillo, six paintings by Goya from the 18th and 19th centuries, and 20th-century works of Pablo Picasso, Joan Miró and Juan Gris. Jordan is widely credited for turning the Meadows Museum's collection into one of the most prominent collections of Spanish art outside Spain. He left the museum in 1981, but remained involved in their activities; he donated most of the Spanish paintings in his private collection to the museum by 2016, and was a member of the executive board of the Meadows School of the Arts until 2018.

=== 1981–1990: Kimbell Art Museum ===
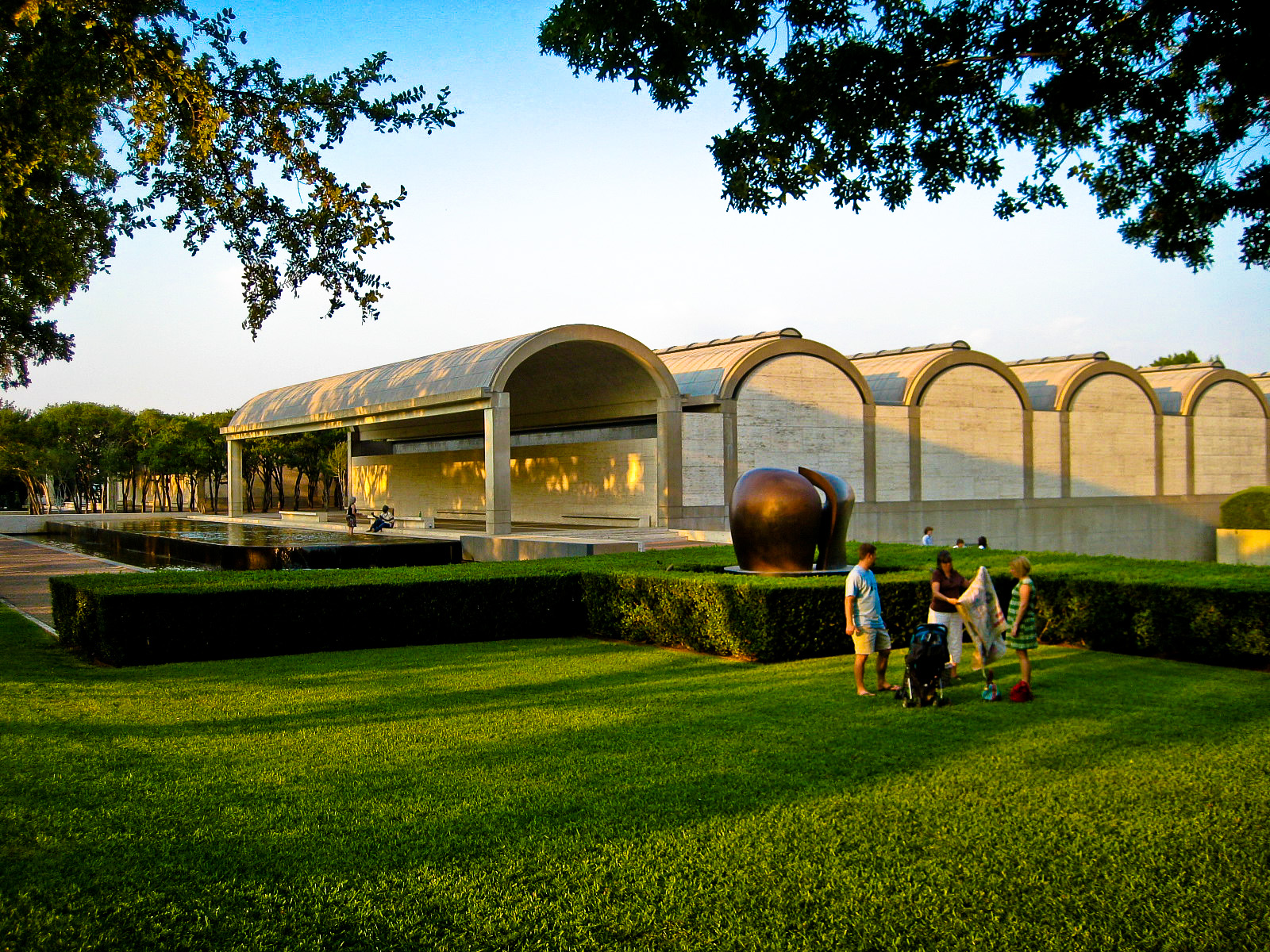
The Kimbell Art Museum provided Jordan a bigger budget to organize exhibitions and acquire paintings.

In 1981, Jordan became the deputy director and chief curator of the Kimbell Art Museum in Fort Worth, Texas. According to Jordan, the museum had not hosted exhibitions of its own artworks before he joined, and they "began an aggressive exhibitions campaign to rebuild and expand the collection." Jordan curated his first major exhibition at the museum with Craig Felton, professor of art at Smith College, Jusepe de Ribera, lo Spagnoletto, 1591–1652 in 1982.

Jordan chaired the scholars' committee (Note: Other members were José Manuel Pita Andrade, Alfonso E. Pérez Sánchez, Jonathan Brown, and Richard L. Kagan.) that planned and selected works for El Greco of Toledo (1982–83); with 66 paintings gathered from several countries, it contained the most extensive collection of paintings by El Greco. The exhibition was displayed at the Prado Museum, National Gallery of Art, Toledo Museum of Art and Dallas Museum of Art, and curated by Jonathan Brown, Jordan, Richard L. Kagan and Alfonso E. Pérez Sánchez. Jordan also authored descriptive texts for the works in the accompanying catalog.

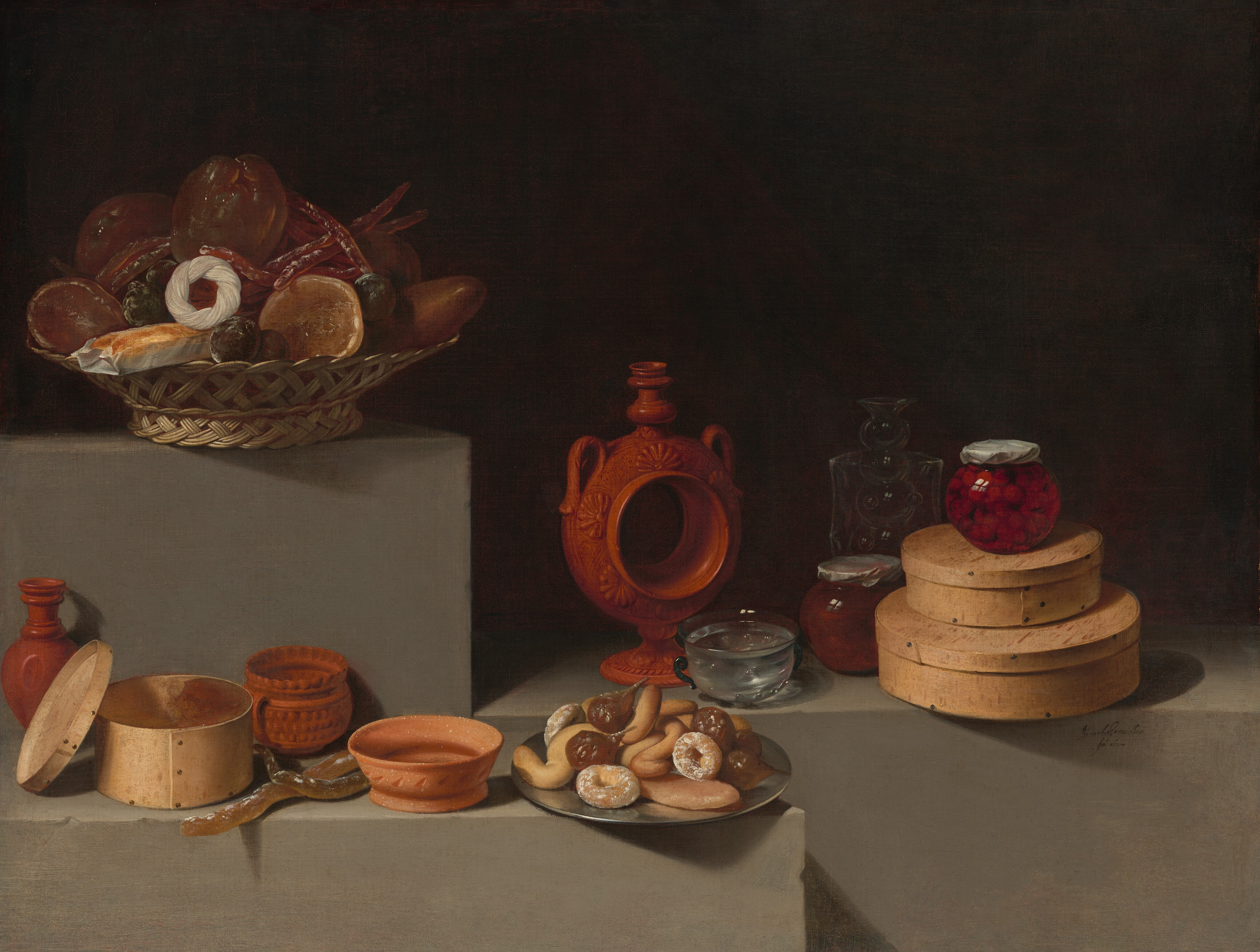
With 11 still lifes, including Still Life with Sweets and Pottery (1627) as the catalog cover, Jordan represented Juan van der Hamen the most quantitatively to reflect his prolificacy in the exhibition.

In 1985, Jordan curated Spanish Still Life in the Golden Age, 1600–1650 at the Kimbell Art Museum and Toledo Museum of Art, the first exhibition in the United States to focus on still life paintings. The exhibition and its catalog, which analyzed the early history of still life paintings and artists of the Spanish Golden Age, were noted by Jordan's contemporaries for being one of the earlier scholarly works in the study of the genre. Jordan was on the Art Committee of the Hispanic Society of America in 1986, and was knighted in the Order of Isabella the Catholic by the Spanish government at the Embassy of Spain, Washington, D.C. for his contributions to Spanish art history on February 18, 1986.

In collaboration with director Edmund Pillsbury, Jordan had helped the museum acquire over 40 paintings of European origin by 1987. He wrote an introductory essay on the museum's collection the same year, published as a part of In Pursuit of Quality: The Kimbell Art Museum: an Illustrated History of the Art and Architecture. Jordan served as an editor of A Prosperous Past: The Sumptuous Still Life in the Netherlands, 1600–1700, authored by Dutch biologist and art historian Sam Segal. The book focused on Dutch still life paintings, and accompanied an eponymous exhibition at the Museum Het Prinsenhof, Fogg Art Museum and Kimbell Art Museum in 1989.

During his term, Jordan acquired notable Spanish paintings Portrait of Don Pedro de Barberana y Aparregui (1631–33) by Velázquez, Four Figures on a Step (1655–60) by Murillo, Still Life with Oranges, Jars, and Boxes of Sweets (1760) by Luis Egidio Meléndez, and Portrait of Heriberto Casany (1918) by Miró, and wrote descriptive labels for all European works in the museum. Jordan retired in 1990 at age 50, following in his father's footsteps who had retired at 49.

=== 1990–2018: Independent work ===
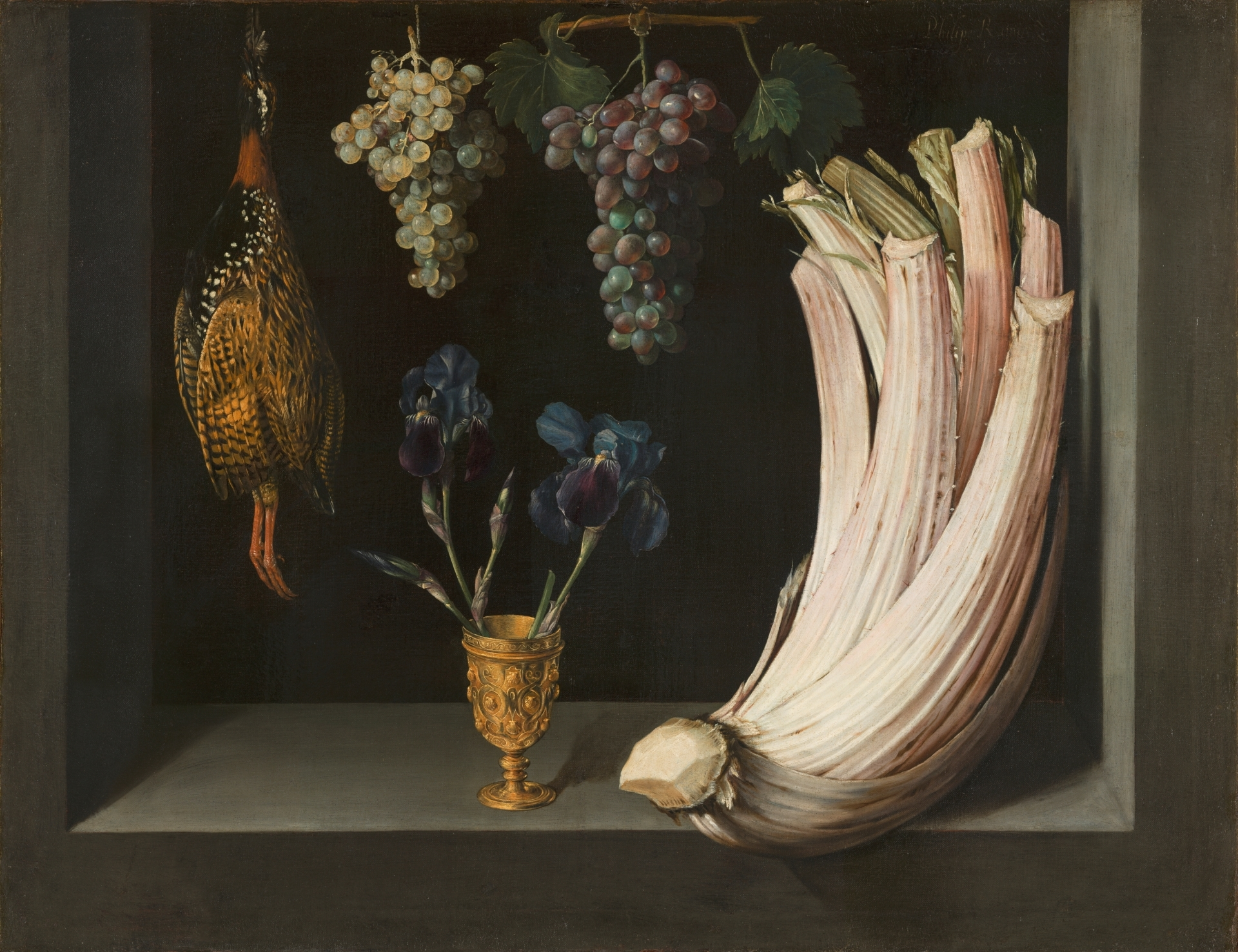
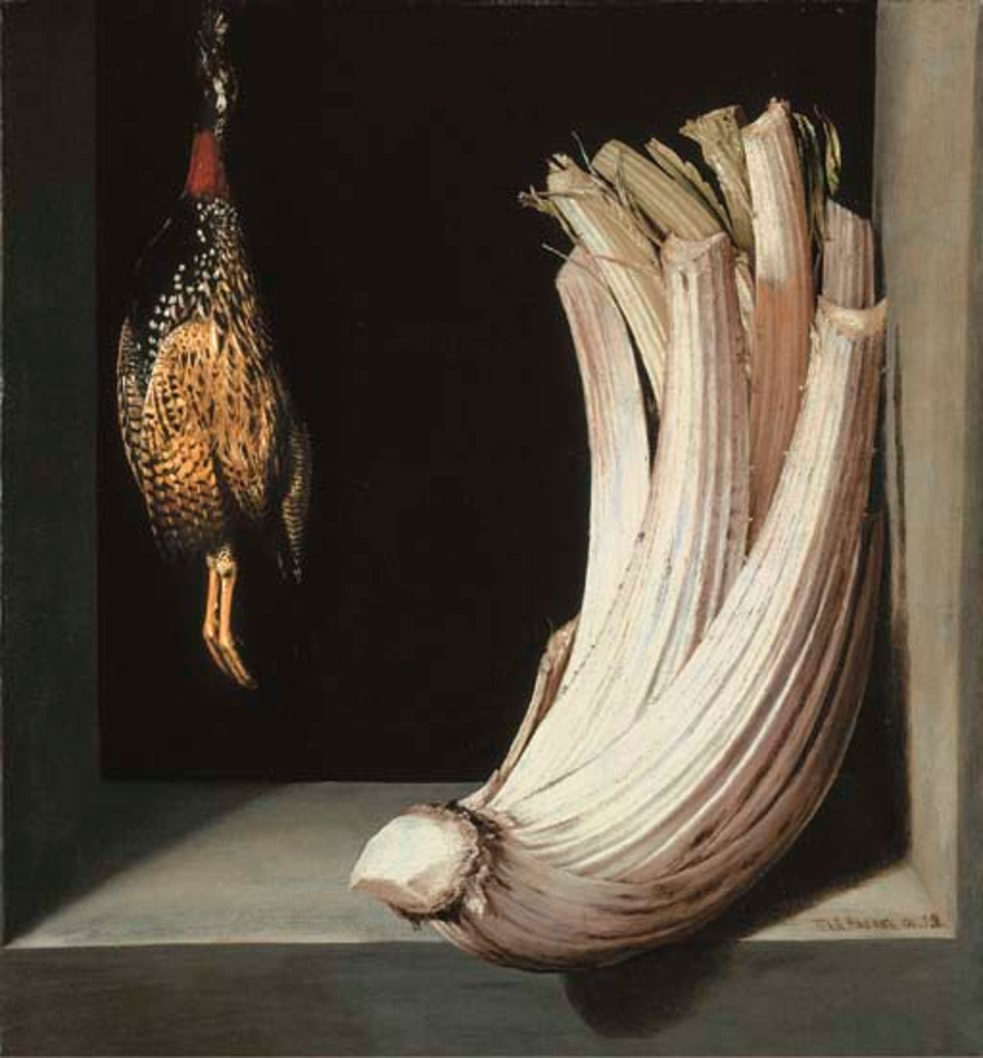
Jordan theorized that Still Life with Cardoon, Francolin, Grapes and Irises (1628; left) by Felipe Ramírez was either inspired by Juan Sánchez Cotán's Still Life with Cardoon and Francolin (1603; right) or a reproduction of a Cotán painting which is now considered lost.

Jordan worked as a private art dealer to fund himself in retirement, and focused on independent publications and exhibitions. He curated La imitación de la naturaleza: los bodegones de Sánchez Cotán (The Imitation of Nature: The Still Life of Sánchez Cotán) at the Prado Museum in 1992, which included all six then-known bodegónes (still life paintings depicting pantry items) by Juan Sánchez Cotán, and one by Felipe Ramírez. He authored its exhibition catalog discussing life, influence and bodegónes of Cotán, and how Ramírez possibly imitated his work.

Jordan and Peter Cherry, lecturer at Trinity College Dublin, curated Spanish Still Life from Velázquez to Goya (1995) at the National Gallery in London, which became the museum's most attended exhibition of the time. Praised for its comprehensiveness, the catalog described the development of still life genre, paintings and artists during the Spanish Golden Age, its decline, and how works of Meléndez, Goya and the Royal Academy revived interest in the subject.

Southern Methodist University awarded Jordan with a Doctor of Humane Letters, honoris causa on May 20, 1995, "for his contributions to the world of arts and for the enrichment he has brought to the campus and the city of Dallas." In 1997, Jordan authored the catalog of An Eye on Nature: Spanish Still-Life Paintings from Sánchez Cotán to Goya, a Stair Sainty Matthiesen Gallery exhibition in New York City. He evaluated details of the paintings and biographies of the artists featured in the exhibition, and expanded upon his ideas and analysis from Spanish Still Life from Velázquez to Goya. When Raymond Nasher was planning to expand their collection into the Nasher Sculpture Center following Patsy Nasher's death, Jordan became a member of the center's board and founding director of the Nasher Foundation in 2001.

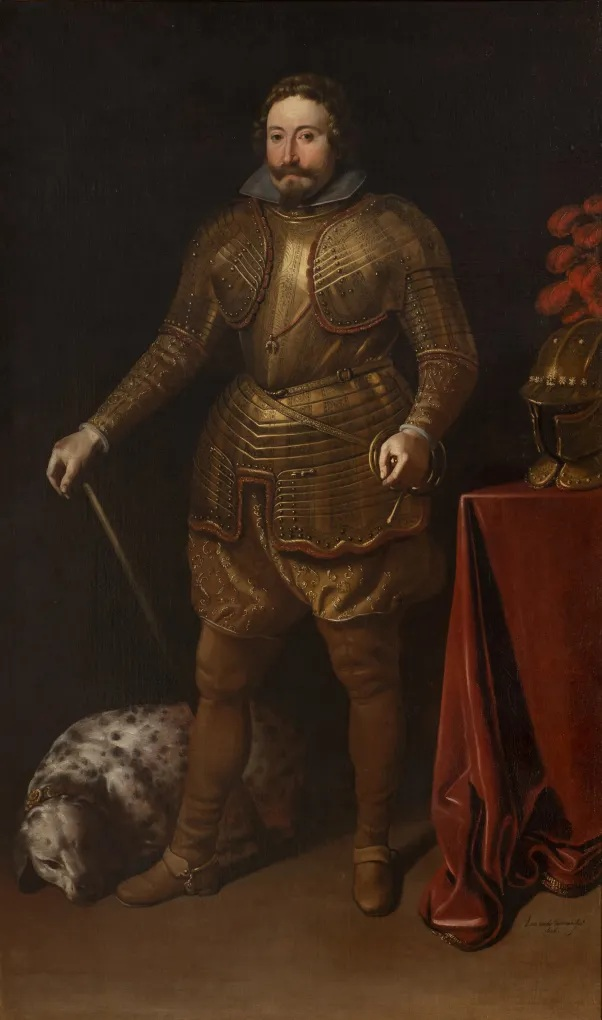
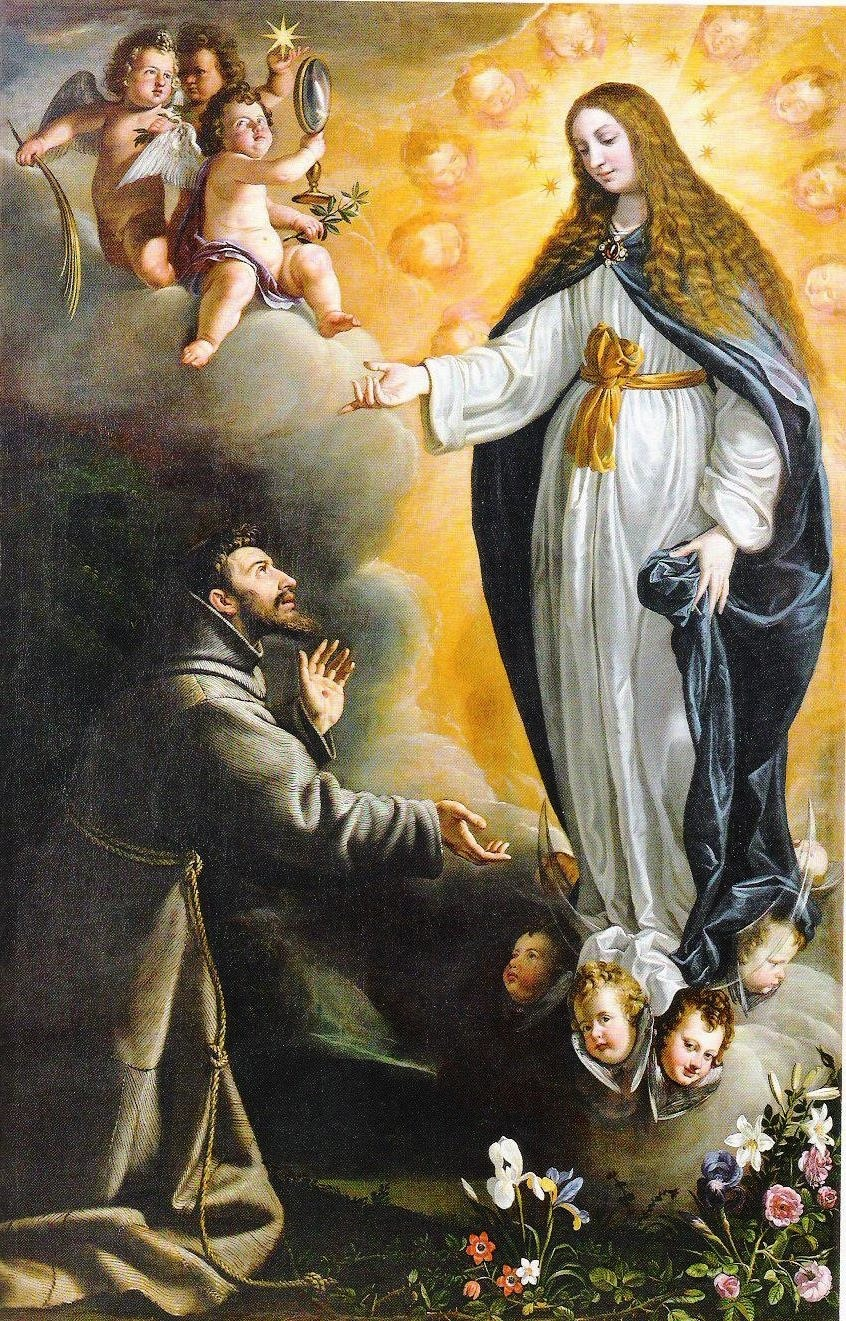
Jordan used Juan van der Hamen's works such as Jean de Croÿ, II Count of Solre (1626; left) (Note: A portrait of Jean de Croÿ, Count of Solre; considered by art historians as one of the most important Spanish paintings from the 1620s.) and The Appearance of the Immaculate to Saint Francis (1630–31; right) (Note: A depiction of Mary appearing to Francis of Assisi; painted for the Franciscan Order and Spanish Crown as a part of a campaign to have papal recognition of the dogma of the Immaculate Conception.) to illustrate his range as a portraitist and history painter, respectively.

Jordan's Juan van der Hamen y León & the Court of Madrid was published in 2005, summarizing results of his work of over 40 years on van der Hamen. Jordan focused on van der Hamen's role in the court of Philip IV during the 1620s, discussed his place among significant Spanish Baroque painters, and emphasized on his versatility by assessing his portraits and history paintings alongside his acclaimed still life work. He curated an eponymous exhibition — the first monographic exhibition on van der Hamen — at the Patrimonio Nacional in Madrid and Meadows Museum in 2005–06. The work was well received by art historians, with praise for Jordan's depiction of van der Hamen's complete artistic output and impact on the Spanish Golden Age. However, there were reservations about the extent of artistic merit Jordan assigned to van der Hamen's portraits and history paintings.

In 2010, Jordan headed the search committee of the Chinati Foundation — where he had been a past president — to find a new director, leading to the appointment of Thomas Kellein. To promote local collecting, he worked with Olivier Meslay at the Dallas Museum of Art to create an exhibition of modern European paintings in private collections of Dallas. They curated Mind's Eye: Masterworks on Paper from David to Cézanne in 2014 with over 120 works on paper of 70 artists from the 18th to 20th-century. The Prado Museum appointed Jordan as an honorary trustee in 2017.

Jordan died on January 22, 2018, at William P. Clements Jr. University Hospital from complications of idiopathic pulmonary fibrosis. He was buried at the Hillcrest Mausoleum and Memorial Park in Dallas. Jordan was compiling a catalogue raisonné of van der Hamen when he died. (Note: Jordan had previously intended to publish this work in 2009 as a follow-up to Juan van der Hamen y León & the Court of Madrid.)

== Connoisseurship ==
There's a lot wrong about art now. I mean, so much of the art today is silly. It's hard to find art of very great quality today. But it does exist.

— William B. Jordan, 2007.

Jordan was an expert on Spanish artists and still life paintings, and art from the Golden Age. Recognized for his ability to assess and attribute historically significant paintings, he collaborated with various museums as an acquisition consultant and offered attributions to several paintings throughout his career.

=== Acquisitions ===
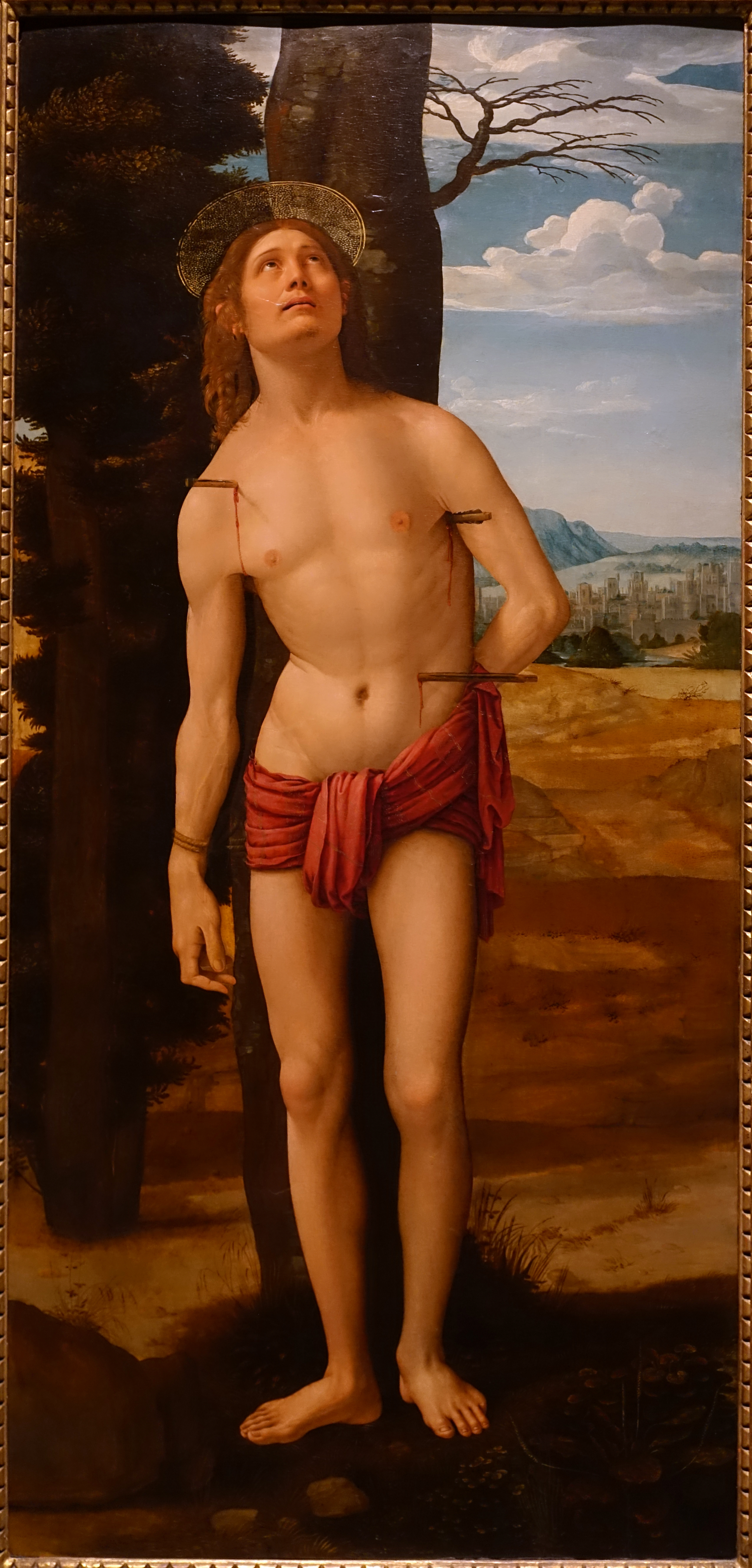
San Sebastián (1506) was first identified as a Fernando Yáñez painting by Jordan.

Jordan noticed San Sebastián (1506) by Fernando Yáñez at a Madrid gallery in 1976. The painting was not published or attributed to Yáñez at the time, and there were no known records in Spanish art sources to support his attribution. However, Jordan was convinced that it was a Yáñez work, and he made the purchase with Meadows' support. Subsequent research established that the painting was indeed done by Yáñez, and it became one of the more important works in the Meadows Museum. (Note: After the painting was purchased, documents were found which detailed acquisition of the work by Louis Philippe I, and its presence at the Spanish gallery of the Louvre as a Yáñez painting from 1838–48.)

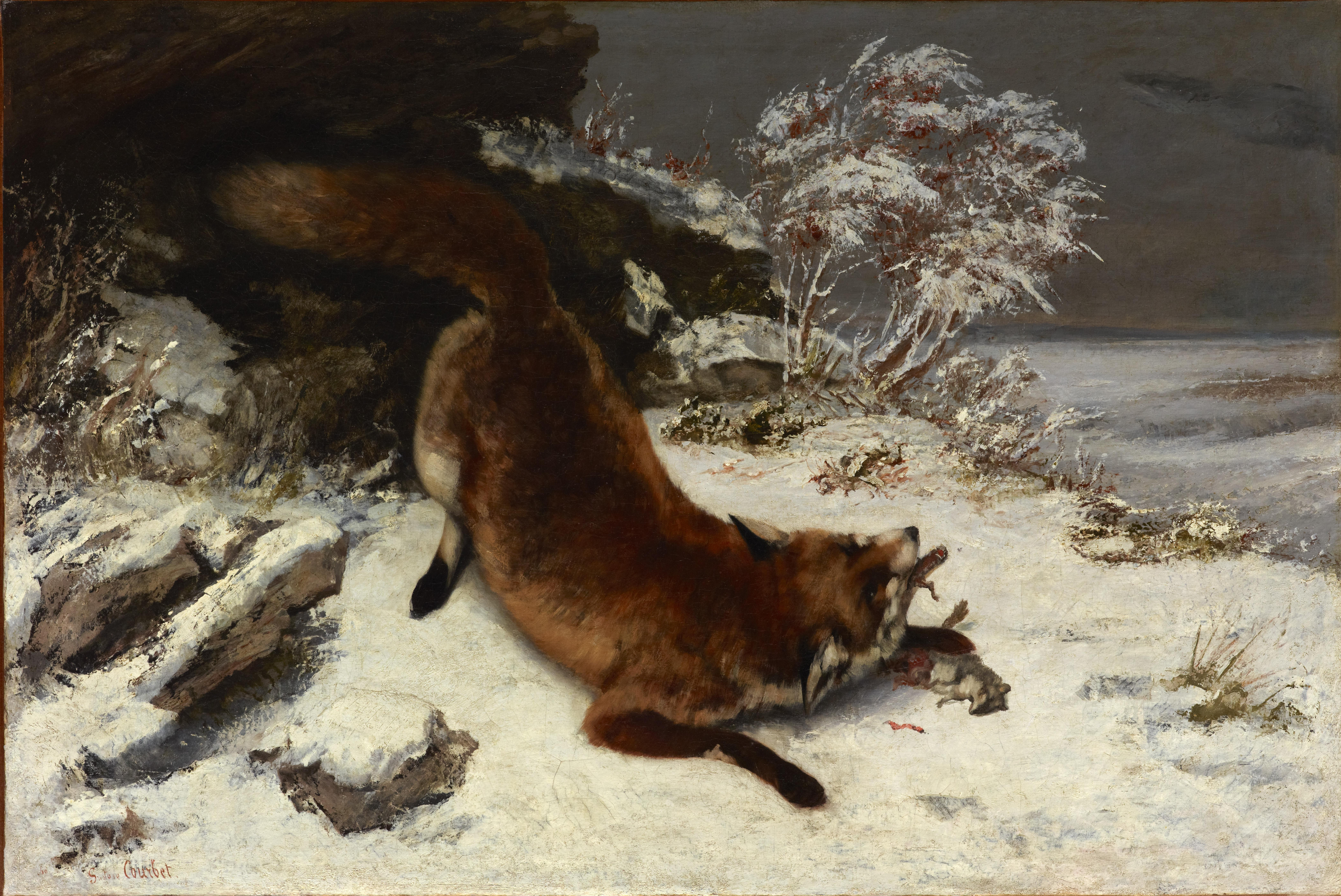
Fox in the Snow (1860) by Gustave Courbet, a French Realism painting.

In 1979, Jordan helped the Dallas Museum of Art acquire Gustave Courbet's Fox in the Snow (1860), a painting that was outside his area of expertise. He was called as an expert by the San Diego Museum of Art during their acquisition of The Adoration of the Shepherds (1572–74) by El Greco and St. Sebastian (1604) by Cotán in 1990. St. Sebastian was then attributed to a "Flemish master", and was first discerned as a Cotán painting by Jordan. The museum purchased the painting after it was vetted and its attribution to Cotán was confirmed by Jordan and other experts.

=== Attributions ===
Still Life with Grapes and Apples (1640) by Juan de Espinosa was reattributed to Juan Fernández el Labrador in Spanish Still Life in the Golden Age, 1600–1650. Jordan reasoned that the painting exhibited softer undertones of grapes and apples, similar to the work of Fernández, and in contrast with Espinosa's sharper treatment of the same fruits. He explained the presence of the same components in still lifes of both artists and similarities in their factures by suggesting that Espinosa was likely inspired by Fernández and tried to emulate his works. While the assessment was positively received by American art historian Nina Ayala Mallory, the Prado Museum maintains the painting's original attribution to Espinosa.

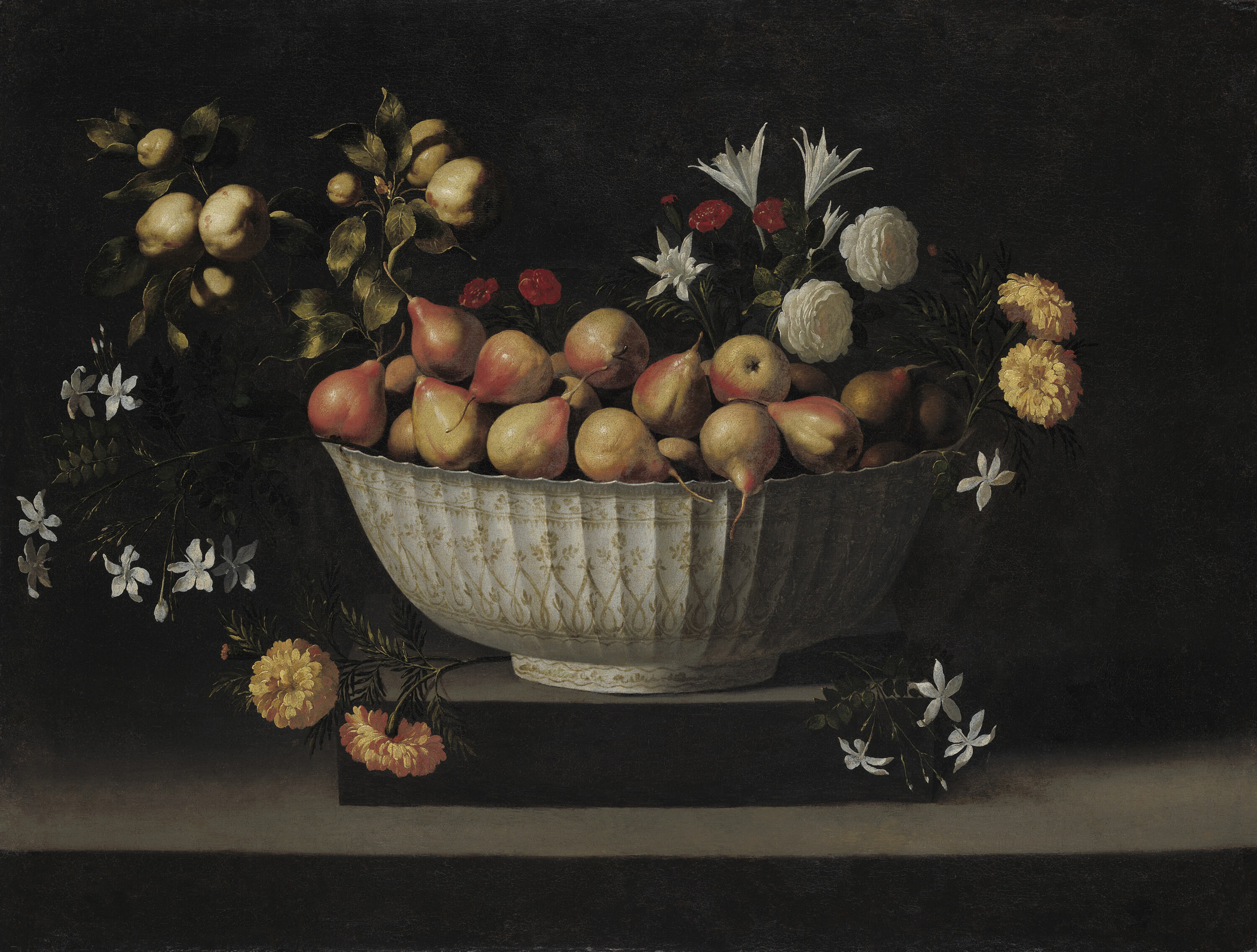
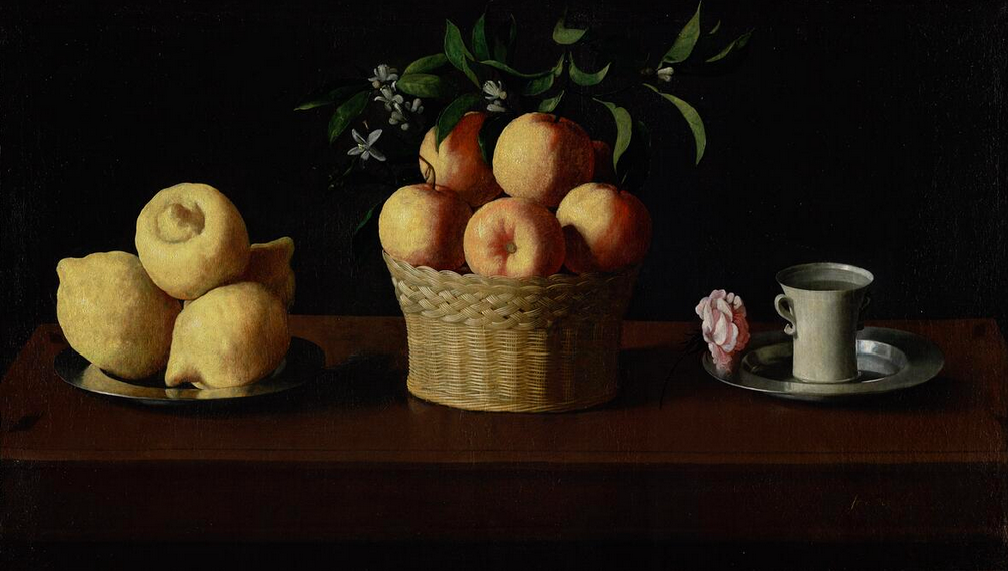
Jordan assessed that Juan de Zurbarán's Pears in a China Bowl (c. 1645; left) differed creatively and qualitatively from still life works of Francisco de Zurbarán, such as Still Life with Lemons, Oranges and a Rose (1633; right).

Jordan proposed Juan de Zurbarán as the artist of Pears in a China Bowl (c. 1645), which was then attributed to his father Francisco de Zurbarán. He assessed that the painting shared technical and compositional motifs with Juan de Zurbarán's Still Life with Basket of Fruit and Cardoon (1645) and Basket of Apple and Quinces (1643–45), and that his approach was stylistically distinct from the works of his father. Pears in a China Bowl is now recognized as a work of Juan de Zurbarán.

Jordan described The Bodegón Keeper (1610–25) as "one of the persistent problems of attribution", and suggested that the painting could be an early work of Antonio de Pereda in Spanish Still Life in the Golden Age, 1600–1650. Jordan was also skeptical of Pereda's authorship of The Knight's Dream (c. 1650), which Pérez Sánchez had reattributed to Francisco de Palacios. Jordan and Cherry affirmed Palacios as its potential artist in Spanish Still Life from Velázquez to Goya. However, they were reluctant to attribute the painting to him, stating that "so little is known of Palacios' style at present that it is not possible to be certain that the painting in the Academia is his." Jordan's assessment of both paintings was met with criticism from his contemporaries. Real Academia de Bellas Artes de San Fernando, where The Knight's Dream is located, continues to credit Pereda as its painter, and The Bodegón Keeper remains unattributed.

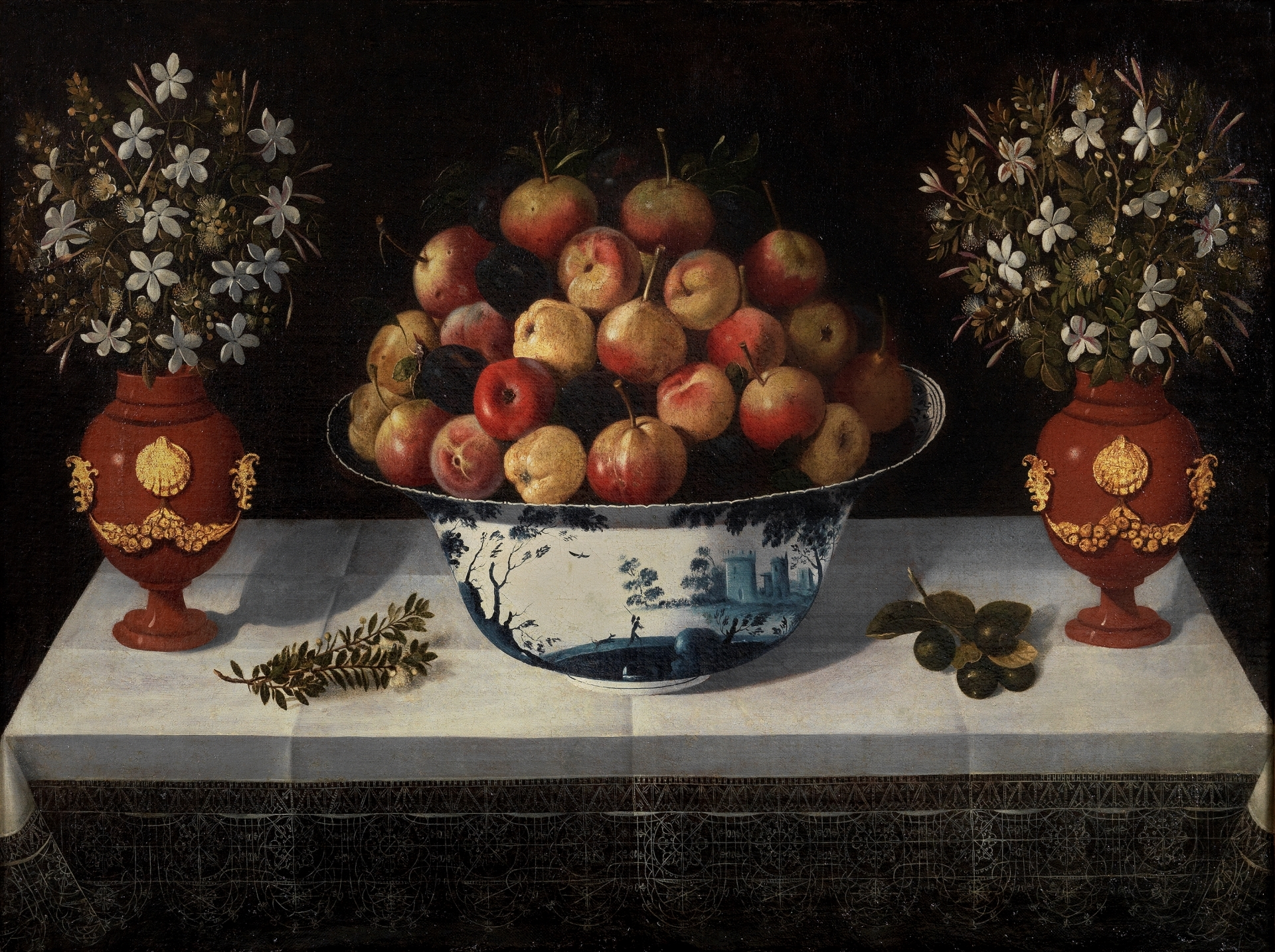
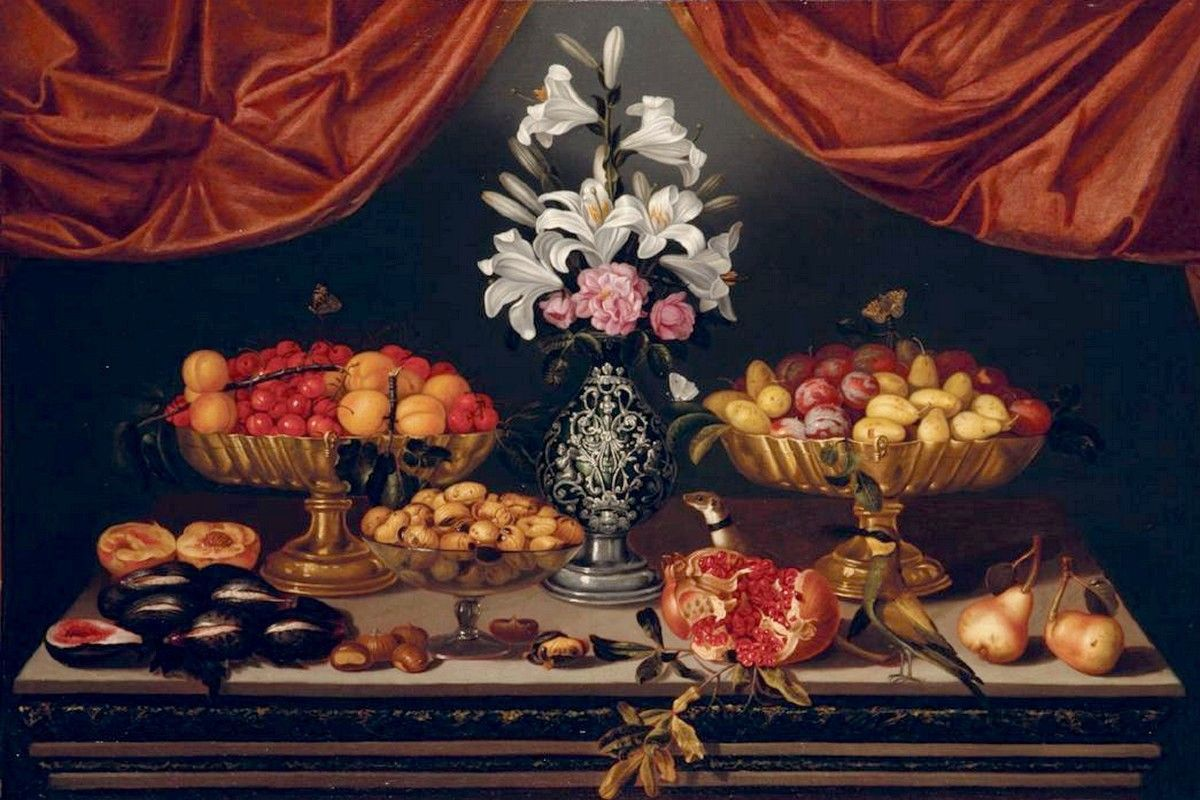
According to Jordan, works of Tomás Hiepes (e.g., Delft Fruit Bowl and Two Vases of Flowers, 1642; left) and Pseudo-Hiepes (e.g., Still Life with Flowers and Fruits on a Ledge, 1675–1700; right) shared elemental, compositional, and thematic motifs, and were fundamentally archaic in relation to the Spanish Golden Age.

In Spanish Still Life from Velázquez to Goya, Jordan coined the term "Pseudo-Hiepes" to describe a then-unknown artist, and attributed around 40 paintings to them due to similarities in their style to the works of Tomás Hiepes. Against a contemporary opinion that the painter was based in Italy, Jordan argued that Pseudo-Hiepes most likely belonged to Aragon, owing to the antiquated themes of paintings from that region. The assessments were validated when Pewter Dish with Melons, Grapes, Apricots and Plums (1675–1700), a signed painting by Bernardo Polo of Aragon, was discovered in 2009. Jordan assessed the painting to be nearly identical in its facture and composition to the works of Pseudo-Hiepes, which also frequently contained elements unique to Pewter Dish with Melons, Grapes, Apricots and Plums. He concluded that Pseudo-Hiepes was Polo.

In Juan van der Hamen y León & the Court of Madrid, Jordan attributed Plate of Pears and Grapes (1626) to van der Hamen, in spite of the painting having the name "Giovanni Battista Crescenzi" inscribed on its back. He stated that the painting exhibited creative techniques and a motif similar to van der Hamen's Still Life with Fruit and Glassware (1629). While Cherry concurred with that assessment, he expressed doubts over some other attributions, in particular arguing that a portrait of Francisco de Quevedo, which Jordan had attributed to van der Hamen, should maintain its original authorship to Velázquez.

=== Private collection ===
Jordan and his husband Robert Dean Brownlee maintained a visual arts collection at their residence in Turtle Creek, Dallas.

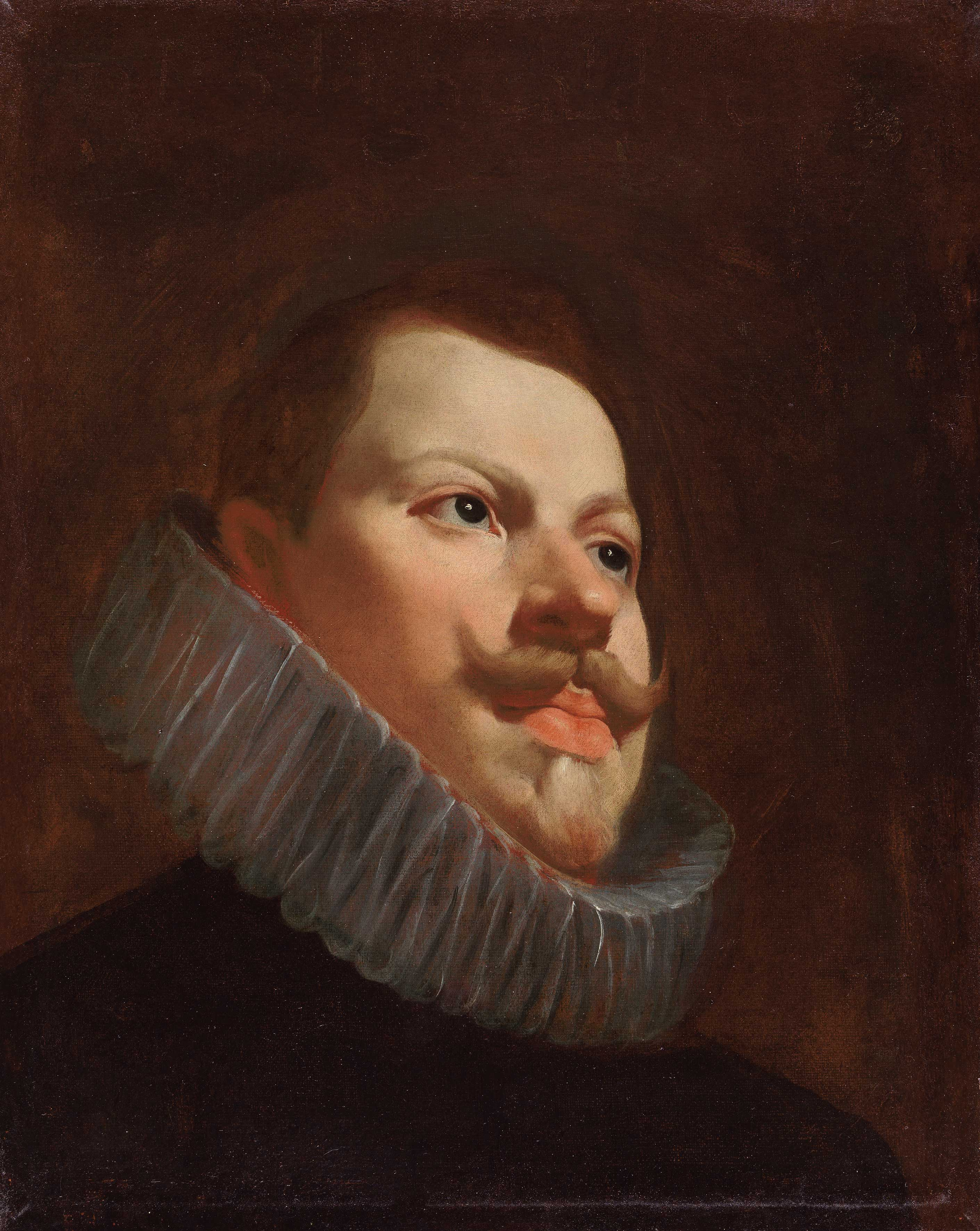
Jordan stated that Philip III's depiction of looking upwards indicated that Portrait of Philip III (1623–31) by Diego Velázquez was not a standalone portrait — in which the subject typically looks frontwards.

Jordan's most notable acquisition and attribution was of Portrait of Philip III (1623–31) by Velázquez. He purchased the piece for £1,000 at a London auction in 1988, where it was titled Portrait of a Gentleman, painted by a follower of Justus Sustermans. Jordan believed that the painting was a work of Velázquez instead, done in preparation of The Expulsion of the Moriscos (1627); the latter is considered by historians to have been burned in the Royal Alcázar of Madrid fire of 1734.

Jordan found that historical accounts of Philip III in The Expulsion of the Moriscos match the expression and direction of Portrait of Philip III; he added that Philip III looking upwards suggested that it was meant to be a part of another painting with a wider scene. He concluded that the style of Portrait of Philip III was similar to Velázquez's distinctive work from that period. Jordan kept the painting in his private collection, and sent it to the Prado Museum for authentication in 2015. After the museum confirmed its attribution, the painting became valued at around US$6 million. In 2016, Jordan donated it to a non-profit organization, the American Friends of Prado Museum, which then gave the painting to the museum as a long-term deposit. (Note: Instead of directly donating the painting to the Prado Museum, Jordan donated it to the museum's US-based organization for tax deduction purposes.)

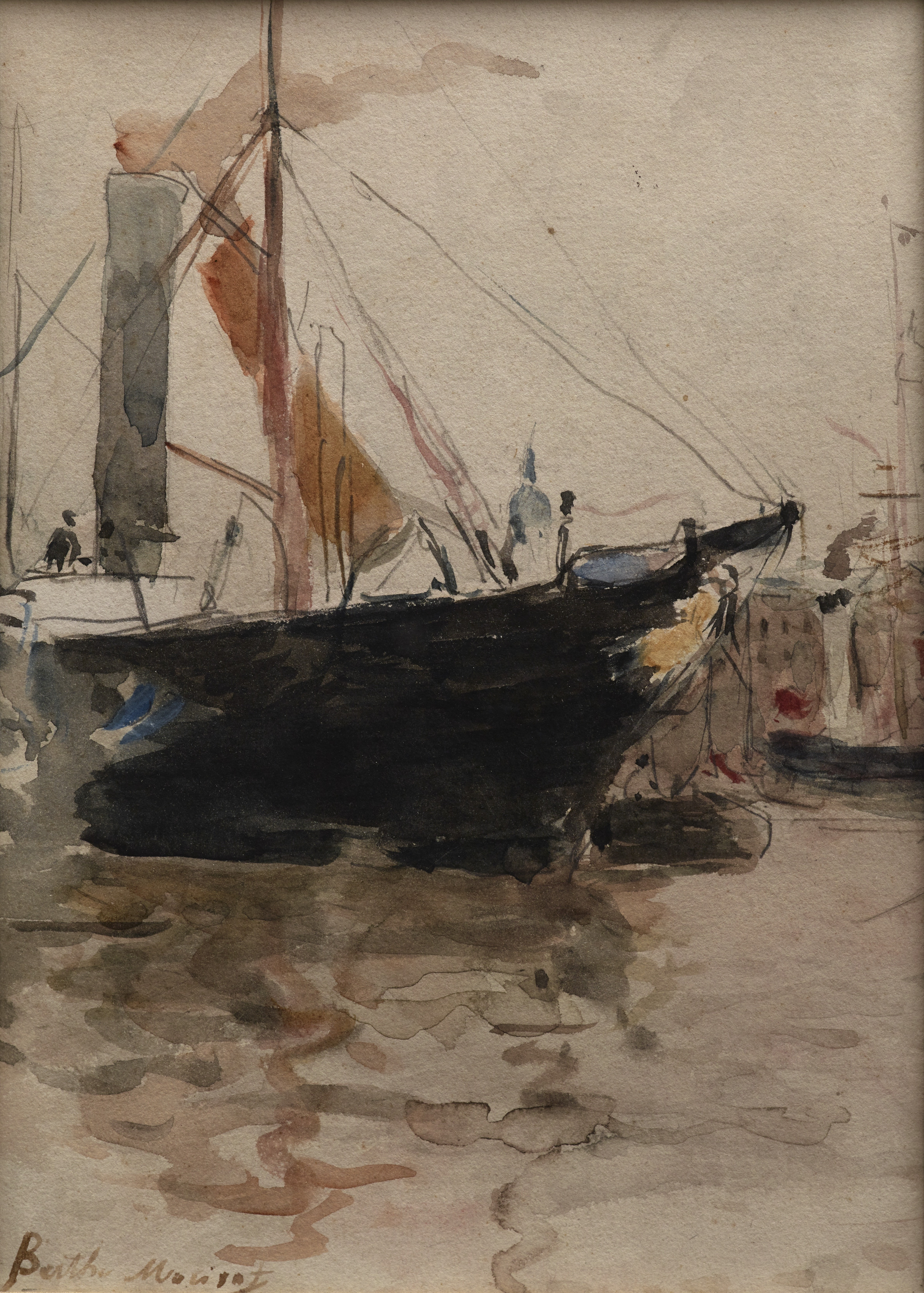
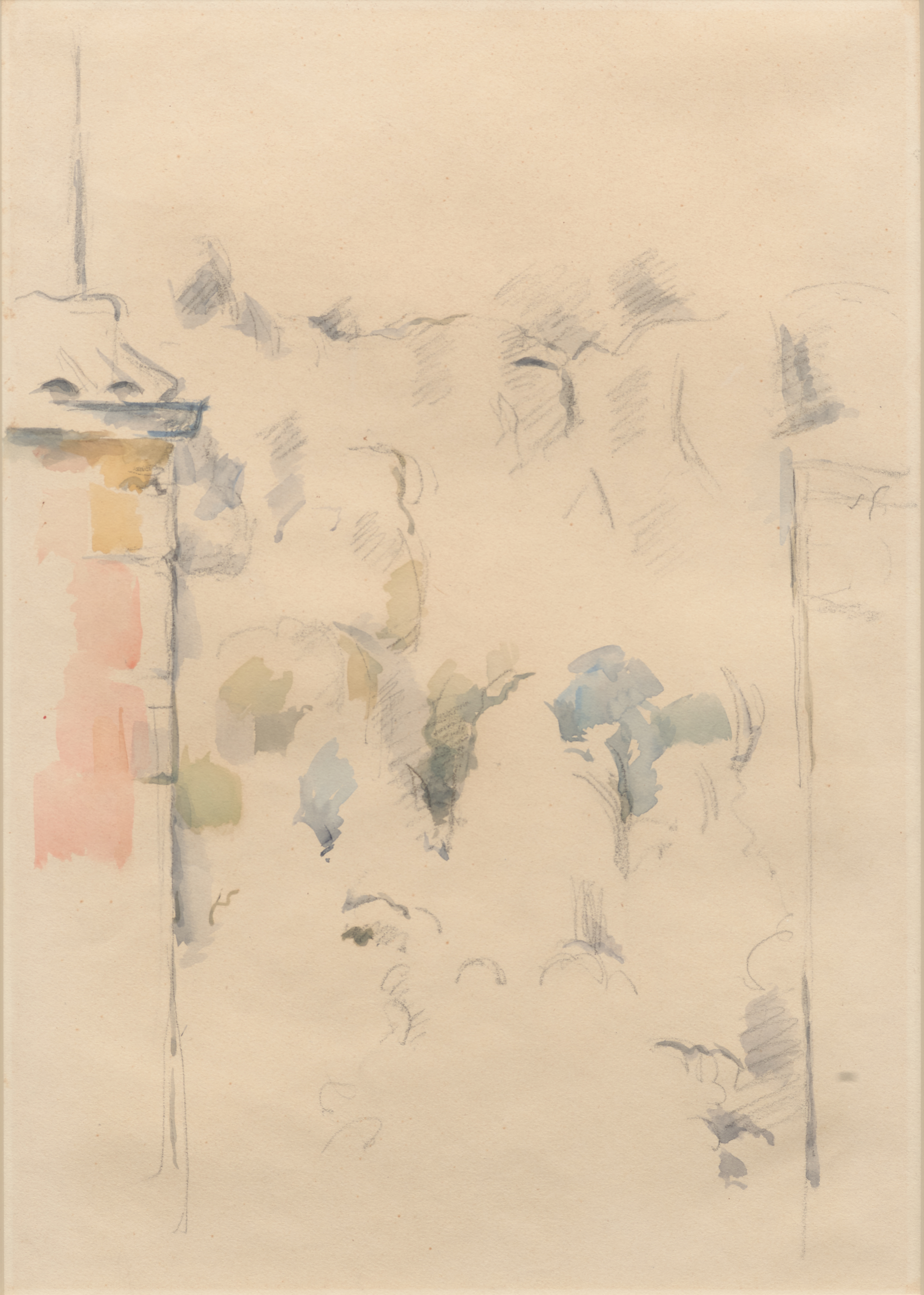
French watercolor paintings like Harbor Scene, Isle of Wight (1875–82; left) by Berthe Morisot and House and Greenery (1895–1900; right) by Paul Cézanne were a part of Jordan and Brownlee's bequest to the Dallas Museum of Art.

The Dallas Museum of Art created a Works on Paper Department and established The William B. Jordan and Robert Dean Brownlee Endowment from donations of Jordan and Brownlee's estate in 2019. They donated over 80 works of art to the museum; 58 of them were works on paper. Their bequest also included oil paintings and furniture from the 19th and 20th-century, and antiquities such as silver works, ceramics and sculptures. The museum organized an exhibition — Point, Line, Plane: The William B. Jordan and Robert Dean Brownlee Bequest — with around 50 of those works in 2021–22.

The National Gallery of Art received a bequest from Jordan and Brownlee containing works of Alberto Giacometti, Cy Twombly, Edgar Degas, Ellsworth Kelly, Eugène Delacroix, François-Marius Granet, František Kupka, Jacques-Louis David, John Cage, Odilon Redon, Pierre Bonnard, and Picasso in 2019. The bequest included a sketch, print, four medals, and 20 drawings. In 2020, Nasher Sculpture Center received sculptures by Claes Oldenburg, David McManaway, John Chamberlain, and Miró as a part of a bequest from Jordan and Brownlee. It included My Father's Watch (For Bill Jordan) by McManaway, who had made the sculpture using Jordan's father's watch in 1973.

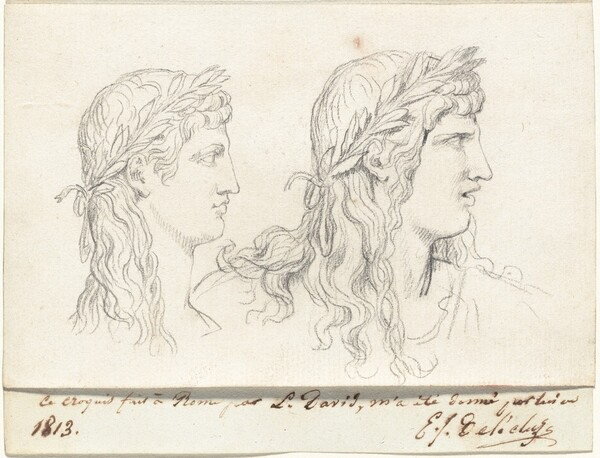
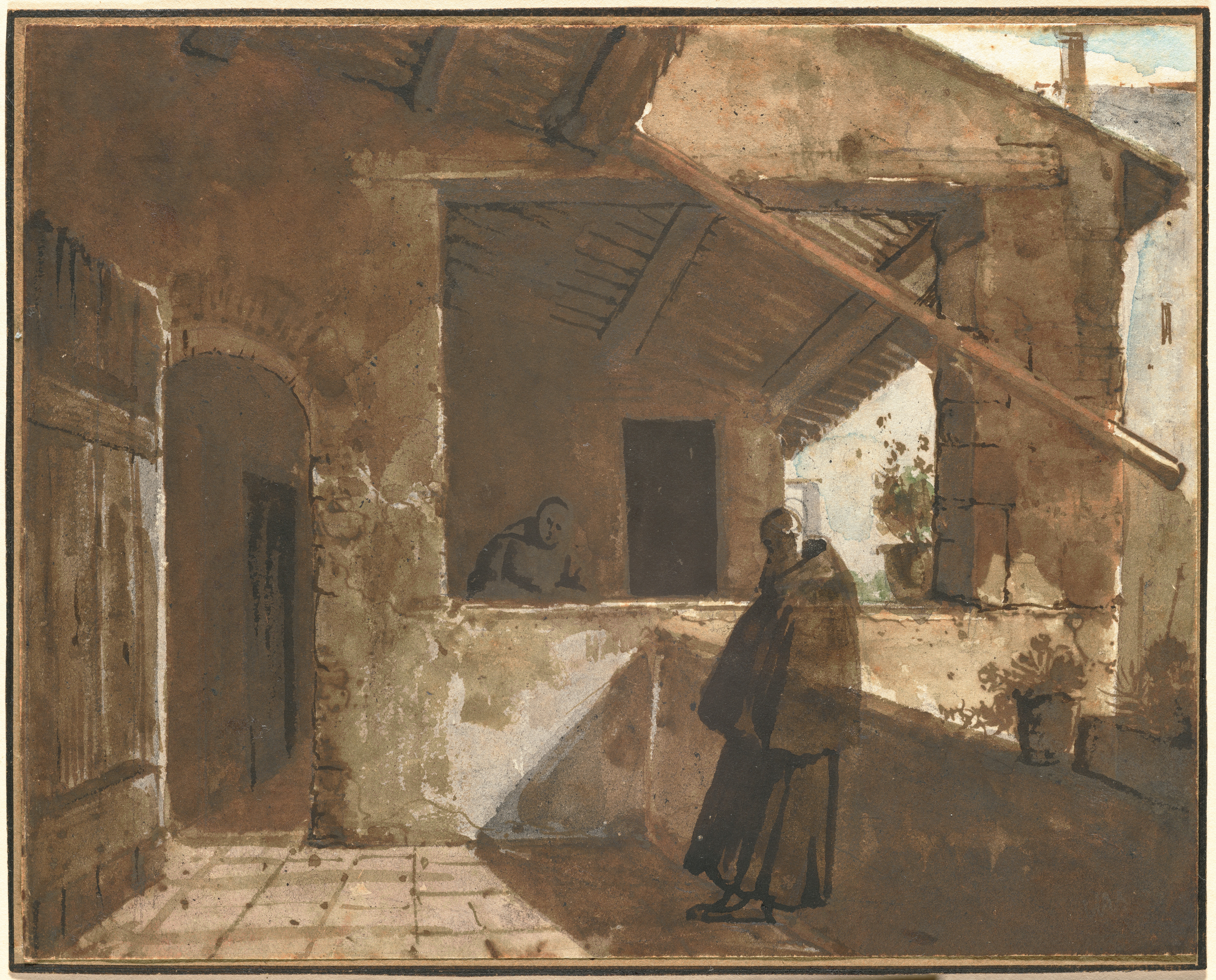
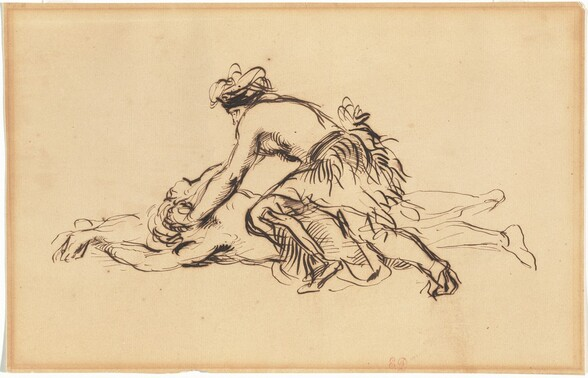
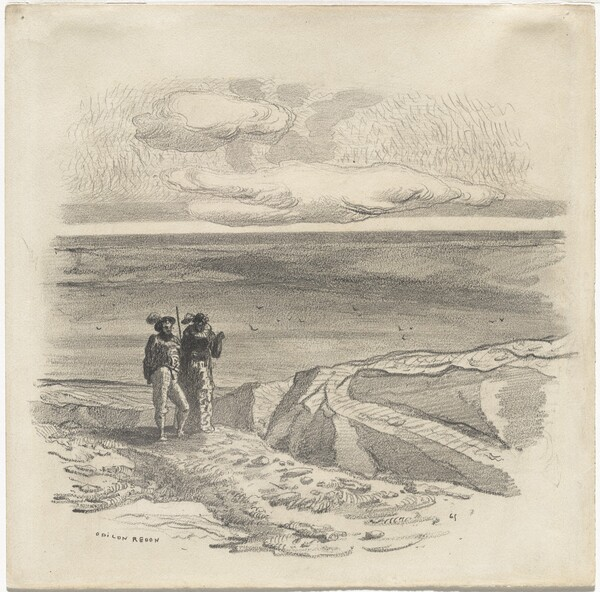
French drawings such as (left to right) Two Studies of the Head of a Young Man Crowned with a Laurel Wreath (1775–80) by Jacques-Louis David, A Roman Cloister (1802–19) by François-Marius Granet, A False Scalping Performed by Iowa Tribe Members in Paris (1845) by Eugène Delacroix, and Two Figures in a Landscape (1865) by Odilon Redon were donated to the National Gallery of Art from Jordan and Brownlee's collection.

== Honors ==
- Spain: Knight of the Order of Isabella the Catholic (1986)
- Southern Methodist University: Doctor of Humane Letters (1995)
- Prado Museum: Honorary Trustee (2017)

== Bibliography ==
=== Books ===
- Jordan, William B. (1967). Juan van der Hamen y León (Dissertation). Institute of Fine Arts, New York University. Ann Arbor: University Microfilm International.
- ———————— (1974). The Meadows Museum: A Visitor's Guide to the Collection. Dallas: Southern Methodist University.
- ———————— (1978). Dallas Collects: Impressionist and Early Modern Masters. Dallas Museum of Art.
- Felton, Craig; ————————, eds. (1982). Jusepe de Ribera, lo Spagnoletto, 1591–1652. Fort Worth: Kimbell Art Museum. ISBN 978-0-912804-10-1.
- Brown, Jonathan; ————————; Kagan, Richard L.; Sánchez, Alfonso E. Pérez (1982). El Greco of Toledo. Boston: Little, Brown and Company. ISBN 978-0-8212-1501-2.
- ———————— (1985). Spanish Still Life in the Golden Age, 1600–1650. Fort Worth: Kimbell Art Museum. ISBN 978-0-912804-19-4.
- Segal, Sam (1989). ———————— (ed.). A Prosperous Past: The Sumptuous Still Life in the Netherlands, 1600-1700. The Hague: Sdu. ISBN 978-90-12-06238-1.
- ———————— (1992). La imitación de la naturaleza: los bodegones de Sánchez Cotán [The Imitation of Nature: The Still Life of Sánchez Cotán] (pdf) (in Spanish). Madrid: Prado Museum. ISBN 978-84-87317-20-0.
- ————————; Cherry, Peter (1995). Spanish Still Life from Velázquez to Goya. London: National Gallery. ISBN 978-1-85709-064-2.
- ———————— (1997). An Eye on Nature: Spanish Still-life Paintings from Sanchez Cotan to Goya. London: Matthiesen Gallery. ISBN 978-88-422-0758-0.
- ———————— (2005). Juan van der Hamen y León & the Court of Madrid. New Haven: Yale University Press. ISBN 978-0-300-11318-1.
- Meslay, Olivier; ————————, eds. (2014). Mind's Eye: Masterworks on Paper from David to Cézanne. Dallas Museum of Art. ISBN 978-0-300-20721-7.

=== Chapters ===
- Jordan, William B. (1980). "A note on Cy Twombly". Cy Twombly: Paintings and Drawings. By Twombly, Cy. Dallas: Southern Methodist University.
- ———————— (1987). "Collections of the Kimbell Art Museum: Introduction". In Pursuit of Quality: The Kimbell Art Museum: an Illustrated History of the Art and Architecture. By Kimbell Art Museum. New York City: Abrams. pp. 98–100. ISBN 978-0-8109-1124-6.
- ———————— (2002). "A Forgotten Legacy: Murillo's Cabinet Pictures on Stone, Metal, and Wood". Bartolome Esteban Murillo Paintings 1617-1682: Paintings from American Collections. By Stratton-Pruitt, Suzanne L. New York City: Abrams. pp. 63–73. ISBN 978-0-8109-0390-6.
- ———————— (2004). "La aparición de la Inmaculada a San Francisco de Juan van der Hamen del Convento de Santa Isabel de los Reyes de Toledo" [The Appearance of the Immaculate to Saint Francis by Juan van der Hamen from the Convent of Santa Isabel de los Reyes of Toledo]. Juan van der Hamen: La aparición de la Inmaculada a San Francisco, Convento de Santa Isabel de los Reyes, Toledo [Juan van der Hamen: The Appearance of the Immaculate to Saint Francis, Convent of Santa Isabel de los Reyes, Toledo]. By Convent of Santa Isabel de los Reyes (in Spanish). Madrid: Área de Comunicación e Imagen BBVA, Departamento de Actividades Culturales. pp. 9–15.
- ———————— (2008). "La Galería del Mediodía de El Pardo y los orígenes de la naturaleza muerta en Madrid" [The Pardo's Galería del Mediodia and the Origins of Still Life in Madrid]. Los pintores de lo real [The Painters of the Real]. By Prado Museum (in Spanish). Barcelona: Galaxia Gutenberg. pp. 119–138. ISBN 978-84-8109-777-1.
- ———————— (2017). "Velázquez's Lost Expulsion of the Moriscos". Velázquez's Philip III: Donated by William B. Jordan. By Prado Museum. Madrid: Prado Museum. pp. 7–22. ISBN 978-84-8480-363-8.

=== Articles ===
- Jordan, William B. (1964–65). "Juan van der Hamen y León: A Madrillenian Still-Life Painter". Marsyas. XII. Institute of Fine Arts, New York University: 52–69. ISSN 0076-4701. OCLC 888248669.
- ———————— (Spring 1968). "A Museum of Spanish Painting in Texas". Art Journal. 27 (3). New York City: College Art Association: 288–296. doi:10.2307/775090. ISSN 0004-3249. JSTOR 775090. OCLC 888248708.
- ———————— (Summer 1968). "Murillo's Jacob Laying the Peeled Rods Before the Flocks of Laban". Art News. 67: 31, 68–69. OCLC 988540627.
- ————————— (Spring 1970). "The Meadows School of the Arts at SMU: Progress Report on a New Enterprise". Art Journal. 29 (3). New York City: College Art Association: 352. doi:10.2307/775474. ISSN 0004-3249. JSTOR 775474. OCLC 5787321907.
- ———————— (December 1981). "Velazquez's Portrait of Don Pedro de Barberana". Apollo. Vol. CXIV, no. 238. Jersey: Press Holdings. pp. 378–379. ISSN 0003-6536. OCLC 888248579.
- Pillsbury, Edmund; ———————— (June 1985). "Recent Painting Acquisitions – II: The Kimbell Art Museum: Supplement". The Burlington Magazine. Vol. 127, no. 987. London. pp. 409–418. ISSN 0007-6287. JSTOR 882120. OCLC 5548469461.
- Pillsbury, Edmund; ———————— (November 1987). "Recent Painting Acquisitions – III: The Kimbell Art Museum: Supplement". The Burlington Magazine. Vol. 129, no. 1016. London. pp. 767–776. ISSN 0007-6287. JSTOR 883245. OCLC 5548485040.
- ———————— (February 1990). "A Newly-Discovered Still Life by Juan Sánchez Cotán". The Burlington Magazine. Vol. 132, no. 1043. London. pp. 96–99. ISSN 0007-6287. JSTOR 884174. OCLC 5548484246.
- ———————— (September 1992). "Naples, Madrid and New York: Ribera". The Burlington Magazine. Vol. 134, no. 1074. London. pp. 622–625. ISSN 0007-6287. JSTOR 885343. OCLC 887159739.
- ———————— (October 1992). "Wadsworth Atheneum Paintings II. Italy and Spain Fourteenth through Nineteenth Centuries. Edited by Jean K. Cadogan. 373pp. + 16 col pls. + num. b. & w. ills. (Wadsworth Atheneum, Hartford, Conn., 1991) . ISBN 0-918333-09-1". The Burlington Magazine. Vol. 134, no. 1075. London. p. 675. ISSN 0007-6287. JSTOR 885287. OCLC 5548482823.
- ———————— (November–December 1999). "Algur Meadows: un recuerdo personal" [Algur Meadows: A Personal Memory]. Goya: Revista de arte (in Spanish). No. 273. Madrid: Lázaro Galdiano Foundation. pp. 343–352. ISSN 0017-2715. OCLC 886820135.
- ———————— (October–December 2009). "El Pseudo-Hiepes es Bernardo Polo" [The Pseudo-Hiepes is Bernardo Polo]. Archivo Español de Arte (in Spanish). LXXXII (328). Madrid: Spanish National Research Council: 393–403. doi:10.3989/aearte.2009.v82.i328.311. ISSN 0004-0428. OCLC 506699573.
