= Gerónimo Ramírez =

Spanish painter

Gerónimo Ramírez (middle of 17th century) was a Spanish painter of Seville. He was a pupil of Juan de las Roelas, likely brother of Felipe Ramírez . He painted the pope surrounded by cardinals and other personages for the church of the hospital de la Sangre, near Seville.
