= Olivier Meslay =

Moroccan-French art historian and curator

- Born: December 4, 1956 (age 69); Rabat, Morocco
- Occupations: Art historian Curator

Academic background
- Education: Paris-Sorbonne University; École du Louvre

Academic work
- Discipline: Art history
- Sub-discipline: British art
- Institutions: Louvre; Dallas Museum of Art; Clark Art Institute

Olivier Meslay OAL (born 1956, in Rabat) is a French art historian and curator. A scholar of British art, Meslay was the fifth director of the Clark Art Institute.

== Career ==
He received a Bachelor of Arts in 1981 and Master of Arts in 1982 from the Paris-Sorbonne University. Meslay then earned another Master of Arts from the École du Louvre in 1983.

Meslay has worked in curatorial and directorial capacities for various museums. He started as a Researcher for Galerie Bailly in Paris from 1984 to 1991. Meslay was then named Curator of British, American, and Spanish Paintings at the Louvre from 1993 to 2006, also overseeing Louvre Atlanta. He was then appointed Chief Curator-in-Charge of Louvre-Lens until 2009. At that point, Meslay moved to the United States to become the Barbara Thomas Lemmon Curator of European Art at the Dallas Museum of Art until 2016, including a stint as Interim Director from 2011 to 2012. In that year, he was named the Felda and Dena Hardymon Director of the Clark Art Institute, the fifth director in its history and replacing Michael Conforti, who had been director since 1994.

In 2022, Meslay was named Officer of the Ordre des Arts et des Lettres by the Government of France.

== Publications ==
- Olivier Meslay, Arlette Sérullaz et Barthélémy Jobert, D'Outre-Manche, l'art britannique dans les collections publiques françaises, Paris, RMN, 1994
- Olivier Meslay, Dominique Serres, peintre de marine du roi George III d'Angleterre, Bulletin de la Société archéologique du Gers, mars 1997, p. 288-321
- Olivier Meslay, Les Dessins britanniques dans les collections du musée Magnin, Bulletin des Musées de Dijon (no 4), 1998
- Olivier Meslay, La Collection de Sir Edmund Davis, 48/14, La revue du Musée d'Orsay, no 8. Spring 1999, p. 40-9.
- (en) Olivier Meslay, The Napoleon of Notting Hill: the Sir Edmund and Lady Davis Gift, vol. I no 2, The British Art Journal. Spring 2000, p. 100
- (en) Olivier Meslay, Exported art from Lowry to Spencer, British artists exhibiting in Paris 1900-1940, vol. I no 2, The British Art Journal. Spring 2000, p. 55-58
- Olivier Meslay, Les collections de peintures et de dessins britanniques du musée des Beaux-Arts de Dijon, Bulletin des Musées de Dijon, 2000
- (en) Olivier Meslay, Sir Thomas Lawrence and France, the portrait of the duc de Richelieu, vol. III no 2, The British Art Journal, printemps 2002
- (en) Olivier Meslay, British painting in France before 1802, vol. IV no 2, British Art Journal, été 2003
- (en) Olivier Meslay, Romney in France, vol. IX, Transactions of The Romney Society, 2004
- Olivier Meslay, Turner: L'incendie de la peinture, Gallimard, coll. « Découvertes Gallimard / Arts » (no 459), 2004
- Olivier Meslay et Pierre Messmer, L'art anglais dans les collections de l'institut de France, Sompgy, 2004
- Olivier Meslay, La famille d’Etigny et le peintre Henri-Pierre Danloux, Bulletin de la Société archéologique du Gers, avril 2004, p. 459-465
- Olivier Meslay, La mélancolie des tueurs élizabetains » essai et notices, Exp. Grand Palais, Paris, 10 octobre 2004 - janvier 2005, Mélancolie
- Olivier Meslay, Reynolds et l'influence de Hyacinthe Rigaud, Le portrait de Jacques Gauthier de 1752, vol. VII no 2, British Art Journal, automne 2006
- Olivier Meslay, Henry-Pierre Danloux (1753-1809), sa carrière avant l’exil en Angleterre, Paris, Bulletin de la Société d’Histoire de l’Art Français, 2007 (année 2006), p. 209-244
- Olivier Meslay, L’enrichissement d’un fonds ancien de la collection Jacques Doucet: les archives Portalis et Danloux, Les Nouvelles de l’INHA, décembre 2009, p. 18-21
- (en) Olivier Meslay, Scott Barker, David Lubin et Alexander Nemerov, Hotel Texas, an art exhibition for the president and Mrs J.F. Kennedy, Yale University Press, 2013
- Olivier Meslay et al., "Catalogue des peintures des écoles britanniques et américaines, catalogue des peintures espagnoles, portugaises et mexicaines", dans Catalogue des peintures britanniques, espagnoles, germaniques, scandinaves et diverses du musée du Louvre, Coordination editorial d'Elizabeth Foucart-Walter, Gallimard-Louvre, Paris, 2013.
- Olivier Meslay, Bill Jordan, "Mind´s eye", Yale University Press, 2014.
- Olivier Meslay, "Motley's Paris Missed Opportunities", in Archibald Motley Jazz Art Modernist, Richard J. Powell editor, Nasher Museum of Art at Duke University, 2014.
- Olivier Meslay, Martha MacLeod, "From Chanel to Reves, La Pausa and its collections", Dallas Museum of Art, 2015.
- Olivier Meslay, “Beauté d’un ordre renversé : Danloux et l’image de l’émigration” in Mehdi Korchane, Figure de l’exil de Bélisaire à Marcus Sextus, Musée de la Révolution Française, 2016, p. 80 à 91.
- Bell, E. and Meslay, O. (2024). Guillaume Lethière [Exhibition]. Clark Art Institute, Williamstown, MA, United States.

== See also ==
- List of members of the Ordre des Arts et des Lettres
