= Richard Kagan =

American historian (born 1943)

- Born: 1943 (age 82–83)

Academic background
- Education: Columbia University (BA); University of Cambridge (PhD)

Academic work
- Discipline: Spanish history
- Institutions: Johns Hopkins University

Richard Lauren Kagan (born 1943) is an American historian specializing in modern history. His focus of research is on the intellectual and legal history of the Spanish Empire under the Habsburgs.

== Life and career ==
Born in 1943, he holds an undergraduate degree from Columbia University and a PhD from the University of Cambridge. Kagan has been a professor at Johns Hopkins University since 1972. There, he acts as the Arthur O. Lovejoy Professor Emeritus of History, with a joint-appointment as a professor in the Department of Romance Languages and Literatures. His work has given him international recognition. He has been invited to deliver speeches about his work in Spain and France (Universidad Autónoma de Madrid, Universidad Complutense de Madrid, Centre national de la recherche scientifique and École des hautes études en sciences sociales).

Kagan is a resident member of the American Philosophical Society He has been a corresponding member of the Real Academia de la Historia since 2012.

His work has addressed various issues regarding intellectual life in the Spanish Empire, such as art, law, the development of higher education, as well as its repercussion in North America.

== Publications ==
- Students and Society in Early Modern Spain (1974)234
- Lawsuits and Litigants in Castile, 1500-1700 (1981)567
- Lucrecia's Dreams: Politics and Prophecy in Sixteenth-Century Spain (1990) 8910111213
- Urban Images of the Hispanic World, 1493-1793 (2000)1415
- Spanish Cities of the Golden Age (1989)16
- Spain, Europe, and the Atlantic World: Essays in Honour of John H. Elliott (1995)1718, edited with Geoffrey Parker
- Spain in America: The Origins of Hispanism in the United States (2002)
- Inquisitorial Inquiries: The Brief Lives of Secret Jews and Other Heretics (2004)202122
- Atlantic Diasporas: Jews, Conversos and Crypto-Jews in the Age of Mercantilism, 1500-1800 (2008), edited with Philip D. Morgan232425262728
- Clio and the Crown: The Politics of History in Medieval and Early Modern Spain (2009), Johns Hopkins University Press2930
