= Four Figures on a Step =

Painting by Bartolomé Esteban Murillo

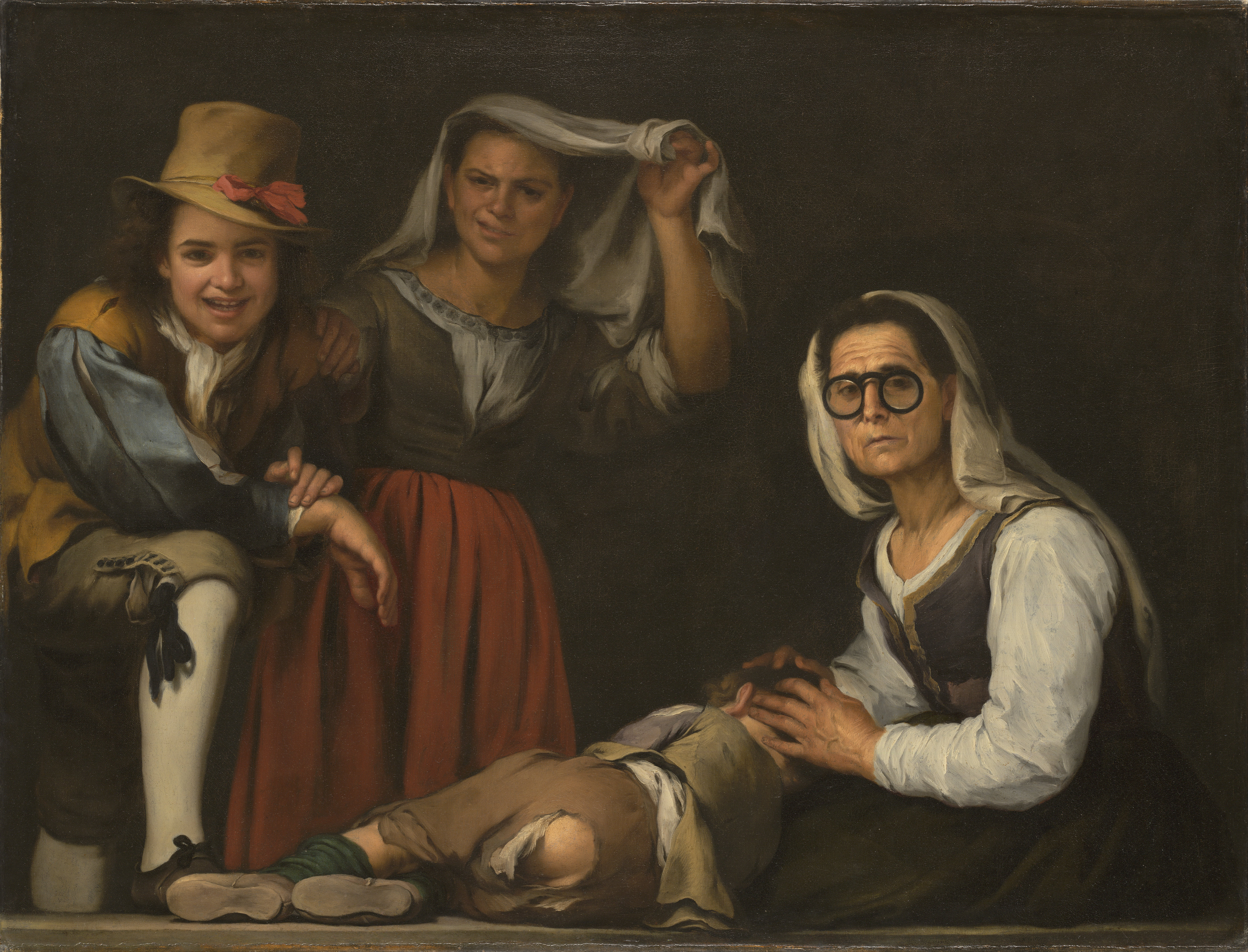
Four Figures on a Step (c. 1655–1660) by Bartolomé Esteban Murillo

Four Figures on a Step is an oil on canvas painting by Bartolomé Esteban Murillo, created c. 1655–1660, now held in the Kimbell Art Museum, which bought it from the heirs of Charles Russell Feldman in 1984. Possibly showing a bawd, it is rare in the artist's oeuvre and largely unprecedented in contemporary Spanish art.

== Provenance ==
Its first recorded owner was Charles Berners Plestow of Watlington Hall in Norfolk, who owned it before 1830. It was then bought from Richard Abraham in London by Sir Charles Coote, 9th Baronet for £126, passing through the Coote family until being sold by the 13th baronet in 1923 for £71 8s, arriving in the United States two years later.
