= Fox in the Snow =

Painting by Gustave Courbet

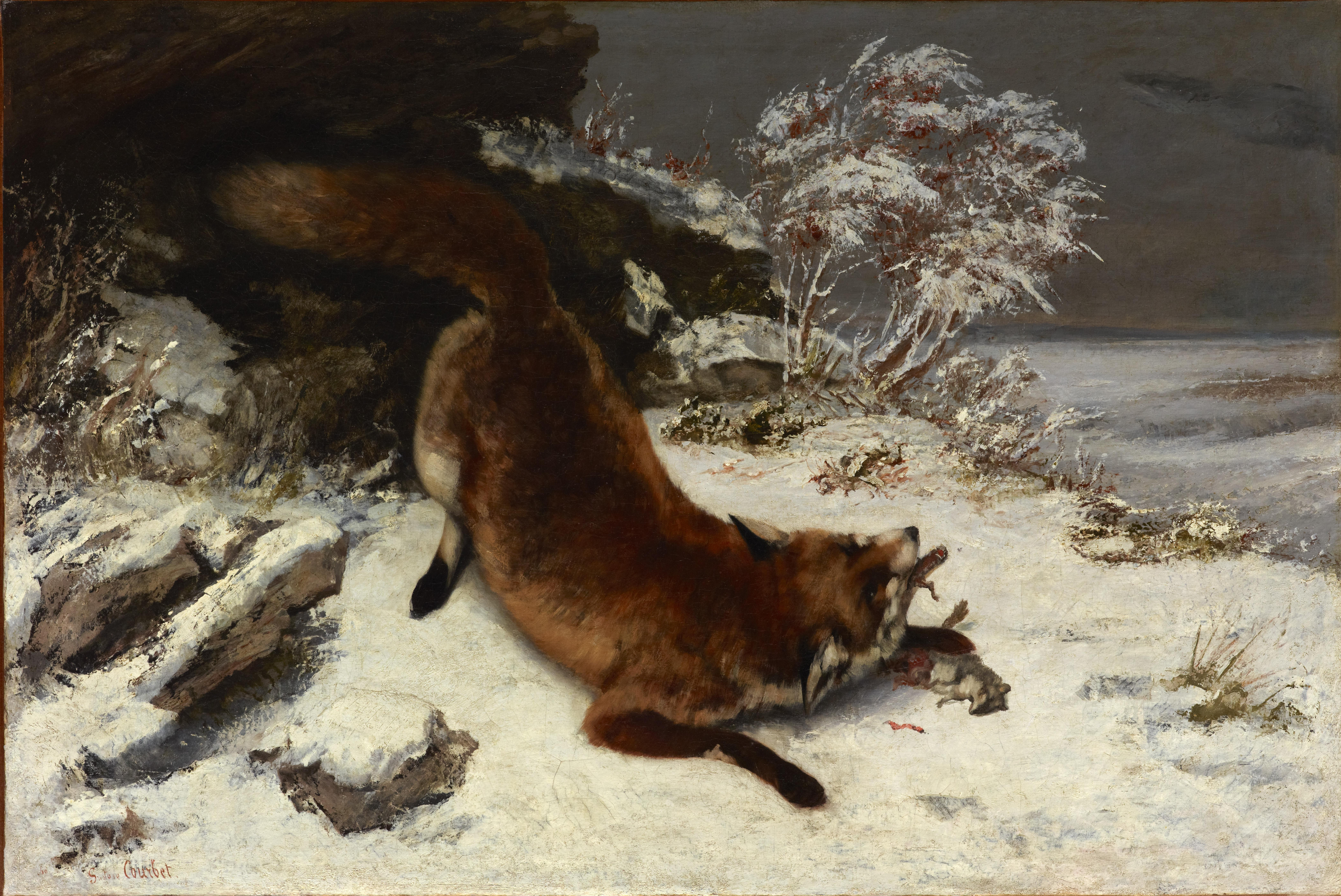
- Artist: Gustave Courbet
- Year: 1860
- Type: Oil on canvas, animal painting
- Dimensions: 87.5 cm × 127.9 cm (34.4 in × 50.4 in)
- Location: Dallas Museum of Art, Texas

Fox in the Snow (French: Le Renard dans la neige) is an 1860 oil painting by the French artist Gustave Courbet. It depicts a fox in winter in the process of savaging a rodent it has caught. This offers a striking contrast of colours between the fox's coat, red blood and white snow. The painting was displayed at the Salon of 1861 in Paris. Today it is in the Dallas Museum of Art in Texas. The painting was a likely influence on The Dead Fox, a painting by future impressionist Edgar Degas .

== Related Works ==
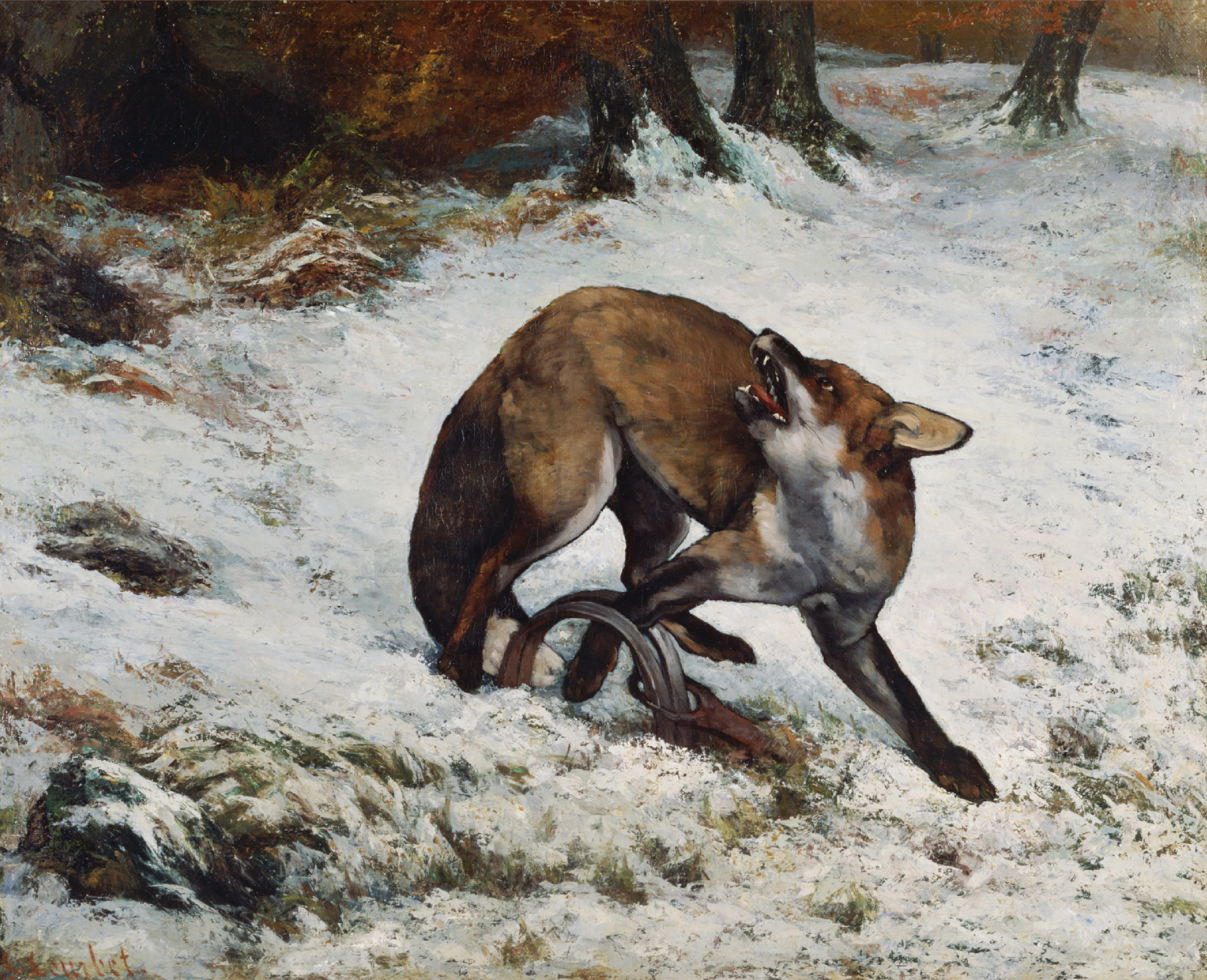
Fox Caught in a Trap, 1860, National Museum of Western Art

Le Renard pris au piège, 1860, musée Courbet

The Dead Fox, 1864, Nationalmuseum

== Bibliography ==
- Fried, Michael. Courbet's Realism. University of Chicago Press, 1992.
- Tinterow, Gary & Loyrette, Henri. Origins of Impressionism. Metropolitan Museum of Art, 1994.
