= Felipe Ramírez =

Spanish baroque painter

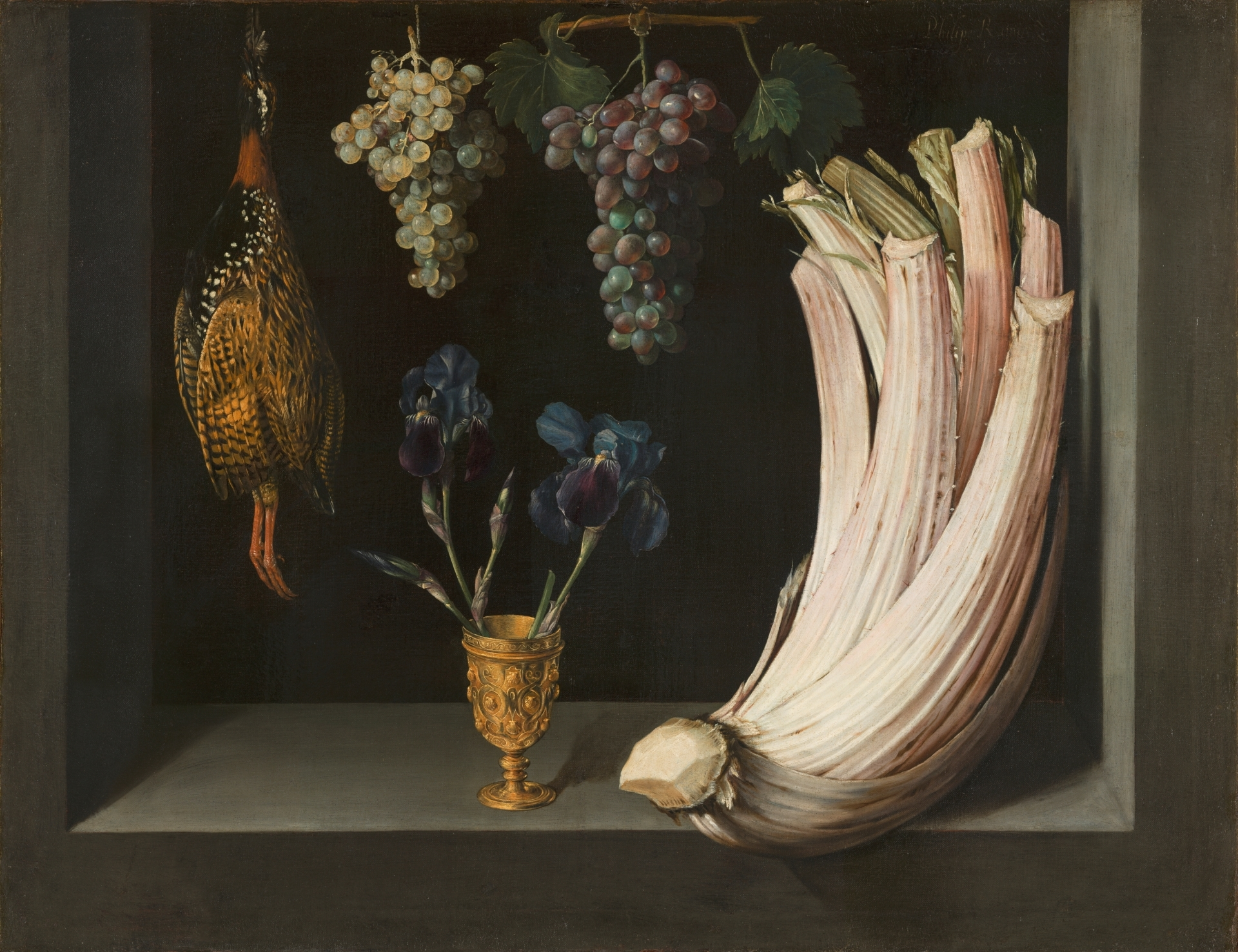
Still Life with Cardoon, Francolin, Grapes and Irises by Felipe Ramírez, Museo del Prado, 1628

Felipe Ramírez was a Spanish painter of Seville, active as a still-life painter during the 17th century. He was probably a relation of Gerónimo Ramírez, and was active at the same period. He painted hunting-pictures, dead game, birds, and various other subjects. He also painted a Still Life with Cardoon, Francolin, Grapes and Irises which is now at the Museo del Prado in Madrid and a Martyrdom of St. Stephen for a church in Seville, Spain.

Ramírez was born in Seville, Spain, in 1604. He studied painting with Juan de Roelas, a well-known Sevillian painter. Ramírez's early work was influenced by Roelas's style, which was characterized by its use of strong chiaroscuro and dramatic lighting.

In the 1630s, Ramírez began to develop his own style, which was more realistic and less dramatic than Roelas's. Ramírez's still life paintings often feature fruits, flowers, and other objects that are arranged in a simple and harmonious way. His use of light and color is also very skillful, and he is able to create a sense of depth and space in his paintings.

Ramírez's work was very popular in his own time, and he was considered to be one of the leading still life painters in Spain. He died in Seville in 1665.

== Works ==
- Still Life with Cardoon, Francolin, Grapes and Irises (1628), 71 x 92 cm, Musel del Prado, Madrid
- Varón de Dolores (1631), now in the private collection in Belgium
