= Portrait of Pauline Bonaparte =

1806 painting

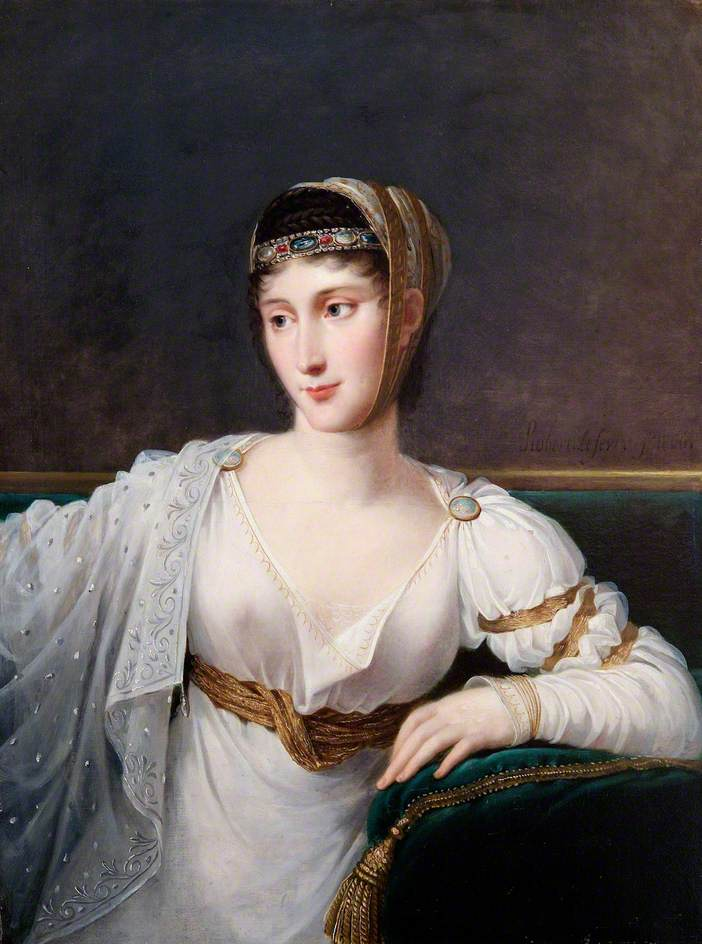
- Artist: Robert Lefèvre
- Year: 1806
- Type: Oil on canvas, portrait painting
- Dimensions: 80.6 cm × 63 cm (31.7 in × 25 in)
- Location: Apsley House; London

Portrait of Pauline Bonaparte is an 1806 portrait painting by the French artist Robert Lefèvre. It depicts Pauline Bonaparte, the Corsican-born younger sister of Napoleon the Emperor of France. The widow of the French general Charles Leclerc, she married her second husband Camille Borghese in 1803. She is shown seated on a sofa wearing a jewelled headress.

Lefèvre was a prominent painter of the Napoleonic era and produced many portraits of Napoleon's extended family. This picture is noted for the diaphanous material of Pauline's dress which reveals her bare nipples. The painting ended up in the possession of the Duke of Wellington along with several other portraits by Lefèvre. Today it remains In the Wellington Collection at Apsley House in London. In 1814 Wellington had acquired Pauline's residence in Paris for the British Embassy in Paris.

== Bibliography ==
- Fraser, Flora. Venus of Empire: The Life of Pauline Bonaparte. Bloomsbury Publishing, 2012.
- Jervis, Simon & Tomlin, Maurice. Apsley House, Wellington Museum. Victoria and Albert Museum, 1997. Qq
