= Agony in the Garden (Correggio) =

1524 painting by Correggio

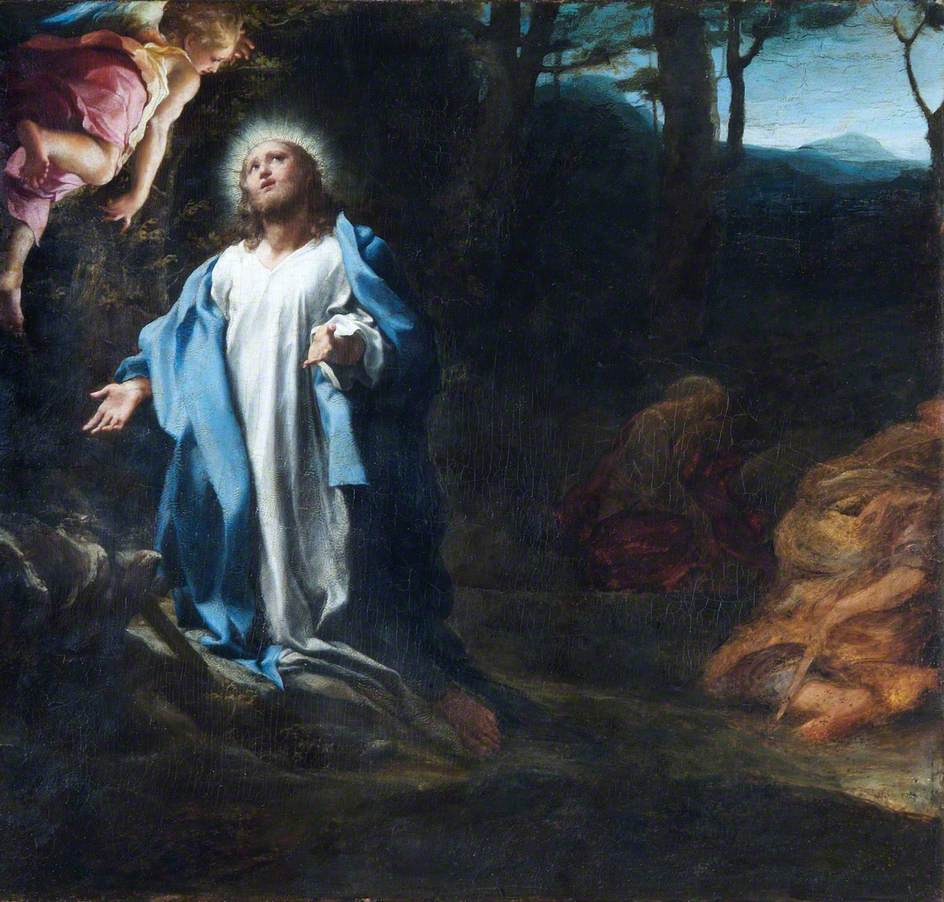
- Artist: Correggio
- Medium: oil on panel
- Dimensions: 38 cm × 41 cm (15 in × 16 in)
- Location: Apsley House, London
- Website: Art UK entry

Agony in the Garden is a small 1524 oil on panel painting of the Agony in the Garden by Correggio, now at Apsley House in London.

== History ==
Now in a poor state, the painting was admired by Vasari in Reggio Emilia - he described it as:

a small painting one foot tall, the rarest and most beautiful thing, in which can be seen his small figures and Christ in the garden - the painting is set at night, with the angel appearing and by the light of his splendor illuminating Christ, who is shown so real and so true that it is impossible to imagine him being expressed better. At the foot of the mountain, on level ground, are three sleeping apostles, above whom he shows Christ praying, which gives an impossible strength to the figures; and even more so, in the background, he shows dawn rising and soldiers coming with Judas from one side of the painting: and in such smallness and with such intensity does he show this story, there is no work that is its parallel for patience and hard work.

This is supported by a contemporary print of the work by Bernardino Curti and a 17th-18th century copy now in the National Gallery.

It was still in Reggio Emilia in the 1580s, in the collection of Rodolfo Signoretti, where it was studied by Lelio Orsi (who copied from it in Christ among the crosses), Titian, Lomazzo, El Greco and Annibale Carracci. A 1582 source reported that "news [of the work had circulated] in Spain and in Rome" and that Philip II of Spain and Alfonso II d'Este had both tried in vain to buy it. The Milanese nobleman Pirro Visconti succeeded in buying it around 1587 and brought it to his villa at Lainate in Milan, where it found favour as part of the deeply religious era of St Charles Borromeo, who kept a copy of it in the room where he died. It was also copied by Giulio Campi in a painting now in the Pinacoteca Ambrosiana. From the house of Visconti it passed to the Marquis of Caracena before being taken to Spain by the end of the 17th century - there it was admired by Anton Raphael Mengs before being gifted to the Duke of Wellington by Ferdinand VII for his actions during the Peninsular War.
