= Wellington Collection =

The Wellington Collection is a large art and militaria collection housed at Apsley House in London. It mainly consists of paintings, including 83 formerly in the Spanish royal collection, given to Arthur Wellesley, 1st Duke of Wellington, who was prime minister as well as the general commanding the British forces to victory in the Napoleonic Wars. It also includes his collection of furniture, sculpture, porcelain, the silver centrepiece made for him in Portugal around 1815, and many other artworks and memorabilia relating to his career.

Gerald Wellesley, 7th Duke of Wellington, gave the house and its most important contents to the nation in 1947. The Wellington Collection, along with the house, is managed by English Heritage and is open to the public.

== Private collection ==
The Wellington Museum Act established the family's right to occupy just over half of Apsley house "so long as there is a Duke of Wellington". The term Wellington Collection is sometimes used to include art works still in the possession of the duke at Apsley House or Stratfield Saye House.

== List of paintings ==
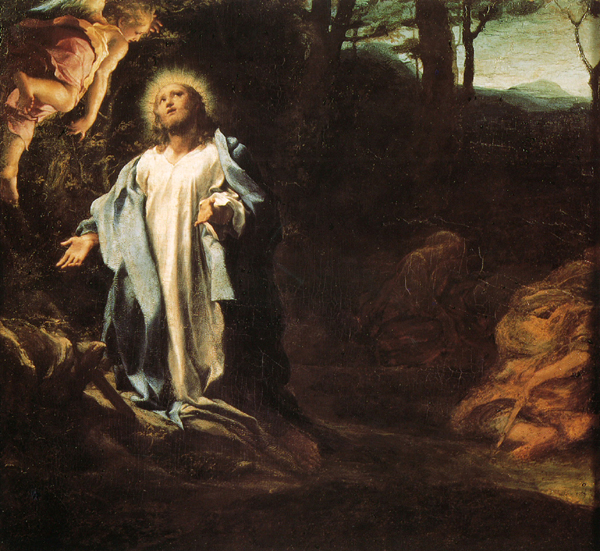
The Agony in the Garden, Antonio da Correggio, c. 1524

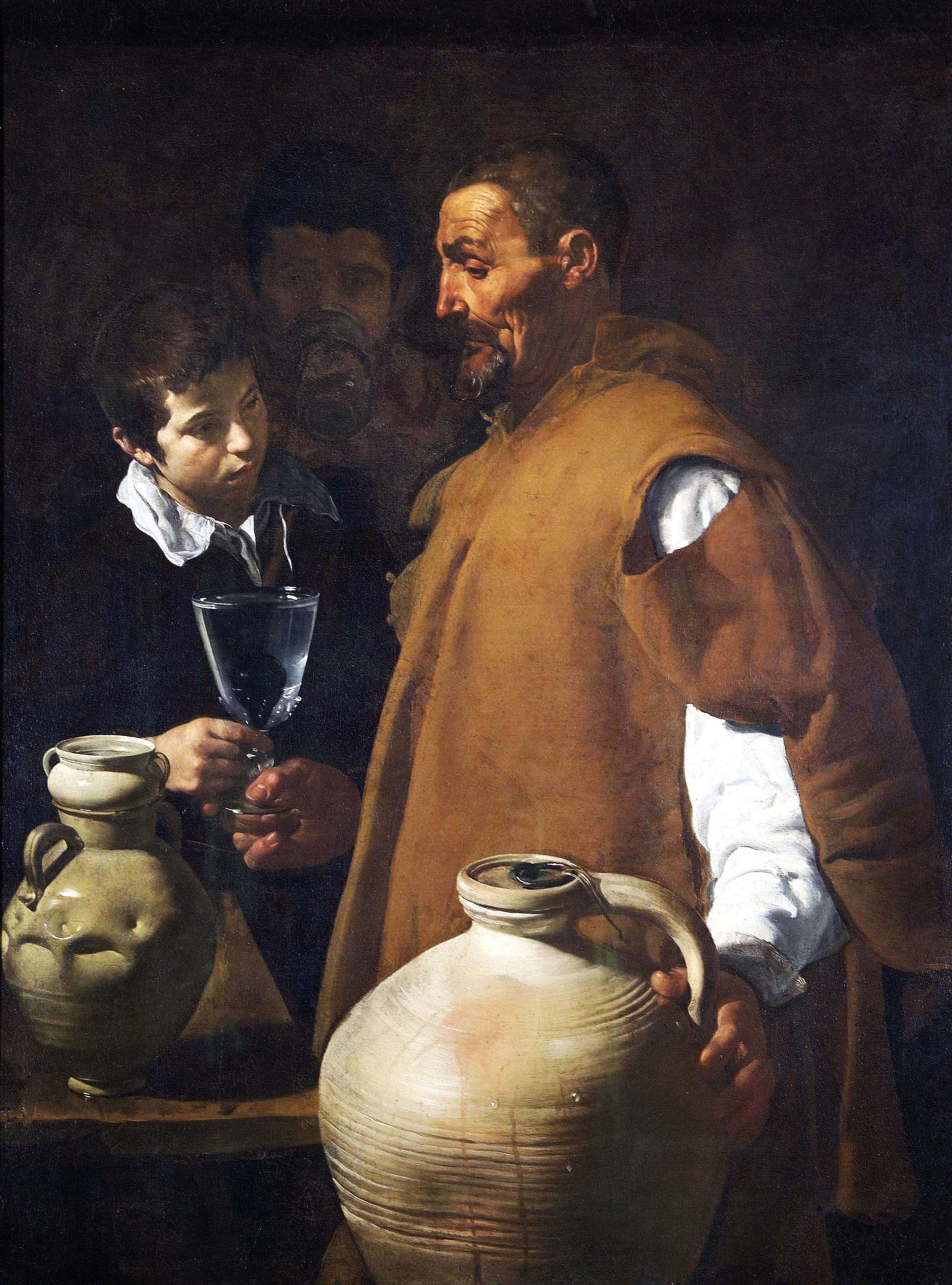
The Waterseller of Seville, Diego Velázquez, 1618–1622

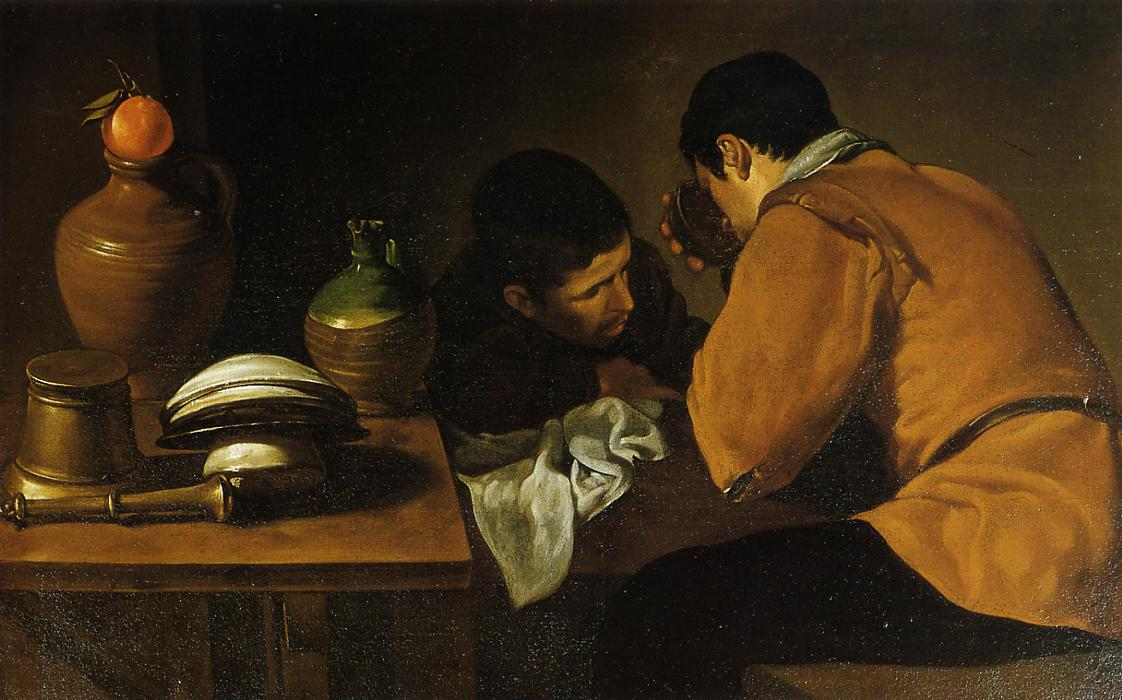
Two men sitting at the table, Diego Velázquez, c. 1618

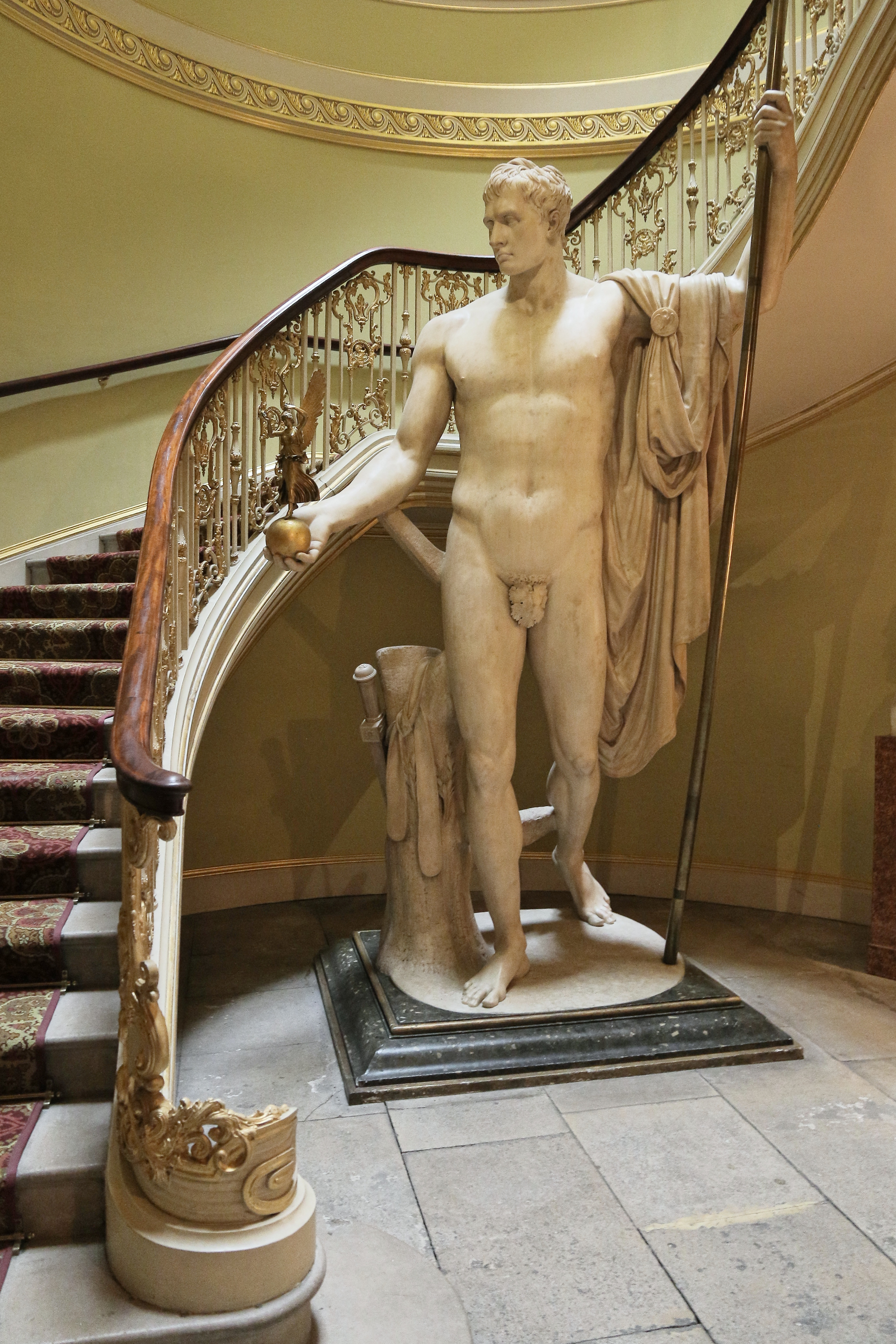
Napoleon as Mars the Peacemaker statue of Napoleon by Antonio Canova

The notable collection of over 200 paintings on display includes 83 paintings from the Spanish royal collection. At the Battle of Vitoria in northern Spain in 1813, the British army captured a carriage full of paintings from the Spanish royal collection. Joseph Bonaparte, whose brother Napoleon had made him king of Spain, had already lost Madrid, escaping with over 200 paintings in the carriage. Most had been removed from their frames and were rolled up in a large "imperial" or travelling-chest, along with state papers, love letters, and other documents. After a quick look, Wellington and his staff thought there was nothing very important or valuable in it, but sent the imperial by sea to his brother William, Lord Maryborough (as he then was) in London for a proper check. His brother called in William Seguier, later the first keeper of the National Gallery, who recognised the quality of the paintings and compiled a list of 165 of the most important.

Wellington then informed the court of the restored Bourbon King Ferdinand VII of the incident, to make arrangements for their return, but the King said Wellington should keep them as a gift. The Arnolfini Portrait by Jan van Eyck was also in the carriage, but (being conveniently small) appears to have been looted by the soldiers, and next appeared in London in 1816 in the possession of a Scottish colonel who had been at Vitoria.

Not all the paintings acquired by the first Duke have been on public display. For example, Danaë, an important painting by Titian, long thought to be a copy, was kept in part of the house not open to the public. Danaë and two other Titians reattributed at the same time were briefly put on public exhibition, for the first time, in 2015.

The painting collection includes work by:

American School

- John Singleton Copley

British School

- Sir William Beechey
- John Burnet
- George Dawe
- John Hoppner
- Sir Edwin Landseer
- Sir Thomas Lawrence
- William Salter
- Sir David Wilkie

Dutch School

- Pieter de Hooch
- Jan van Huysum
- Nicolaes Maes
- Willem van Mieris
- Antonis Mor
- Aernout van der Neer
- Adriaen van Ostade
- Cornelius van Poelenburgh
- Jan Steen
- Willem van de Velde the Younger
- Jan Victors

Flemish School

- Paul Brill
- Adriaen Brouwer
- Jan Brueghel the Elder
- Anthony van Dyck
- Antony Francis van der Meulen
- Peter Paul Rubens
- David Teniers the Younger

French School

- Claude Lorrain
- Claude-Joseph Vernet
- Robert Lefèvre

German School

- Hans von Aachen
- Adam Elsheimer
- Anton Raphael Mengs

Italian School

- Leandro Bassano
- Cecco del Caravaggio
- Giuseppe Cesari
- Carlo Cignani
- Antonio da Correggio (including Agony in the Garden)
- Luca Giordano
- Antiveduto Grammatica
- Guercino
- Giovanni Paolo Panini
- Guido Reni
- Giulio Romano
- Salvator Rosa
- Francesco Trevisani
- Marcello Venusti

Spanish School

- Velázquez, Diego (4 paintings, including The Waterseller of Seville)
- Francisco Goya (1 painting)
- Bartolomé Esteban Murillo (3 paintings)
- Jusepe de Ribera (3 paintings)

== Other art ==
Antonio Canova's heroic marble nude of Napoleon as Mars the Peacemaker (1802–10) is holding a gilded Nike in the palm of his right hand, and stands 3.45 metres (11.3 ft) to the raised left hand holding a staff. It was set up for a time in the Louvre and was bought by the British government for Wellington in 1816 and is placed at the bottom of a stairwell (in some people's opinion rather dismissively).

The 1st Duke received many gifts from European continental rulers that are displayed in the House:

- A pair of large candelabra of Siberian porphyry, ormolu & malachite centre and two side tables, presented by Nicholas I of Russia.
- A pair of Swedish porphyry urns, from King Charles XIV John of Sweden.
- A dinner service of Berlin porcelain, from Frederick William III of Prussia, to honour the Duke after his victory over Napoleon at the Battle of Waterloo in 1815. This is now partly set out as for a dinner.
- The Egyptian revival dinner service of Sèvres porcelain, from Louis XVIII.
- The silver and silver-gilt Portuguese service of over a thousand pieces, from the Portuguese Council of Regency.
- The Saxon Service of Meissen porcelain, from Frederick Augustus I of Saxony.
- Seven marshal's batons from various European continental rulers (and another three from the British monarchs). Nine of them are on display at Apsley House (the Russian baton was stolen in the 1960s).

Napoleon's sword had been given to Wellington by Blücher. Made by Napoleon's goldsmith Martin-Guillaume Biennais, it is today on display at Apsley House along with its three scabbards. The Duke's uniform and other memorabilia may be seen in the basement.

== See also ==
- Stratfield Saye House, the country home of the dukes of Wellington
