= Charles IV in his Hunting Clothes =

1799 painting by Francisco Goya

- Carlos IV vestido de cazador (Spanish)
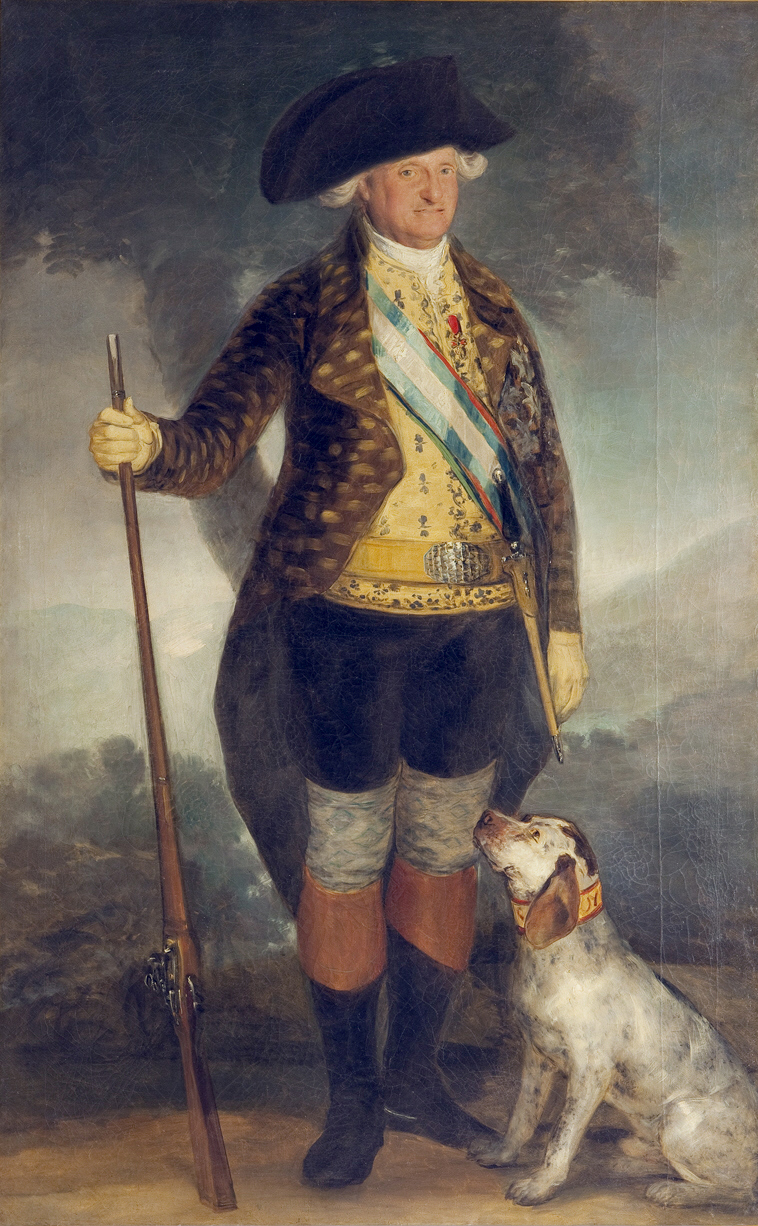
- Artist: Francisco Goya
- Year: 1799
- Medium: Oil on canvas
- Dimensions: 210 cm × 130 cm (83 in × 51 in)
- Location: Royal Palace of Madrid; Madrid

Charles IV in his Hunting Clothes is an oil on canvas painting of 1799 by the Spanish artist Francisco Goya, the second of his two portraits of King Charles IV of Spain.

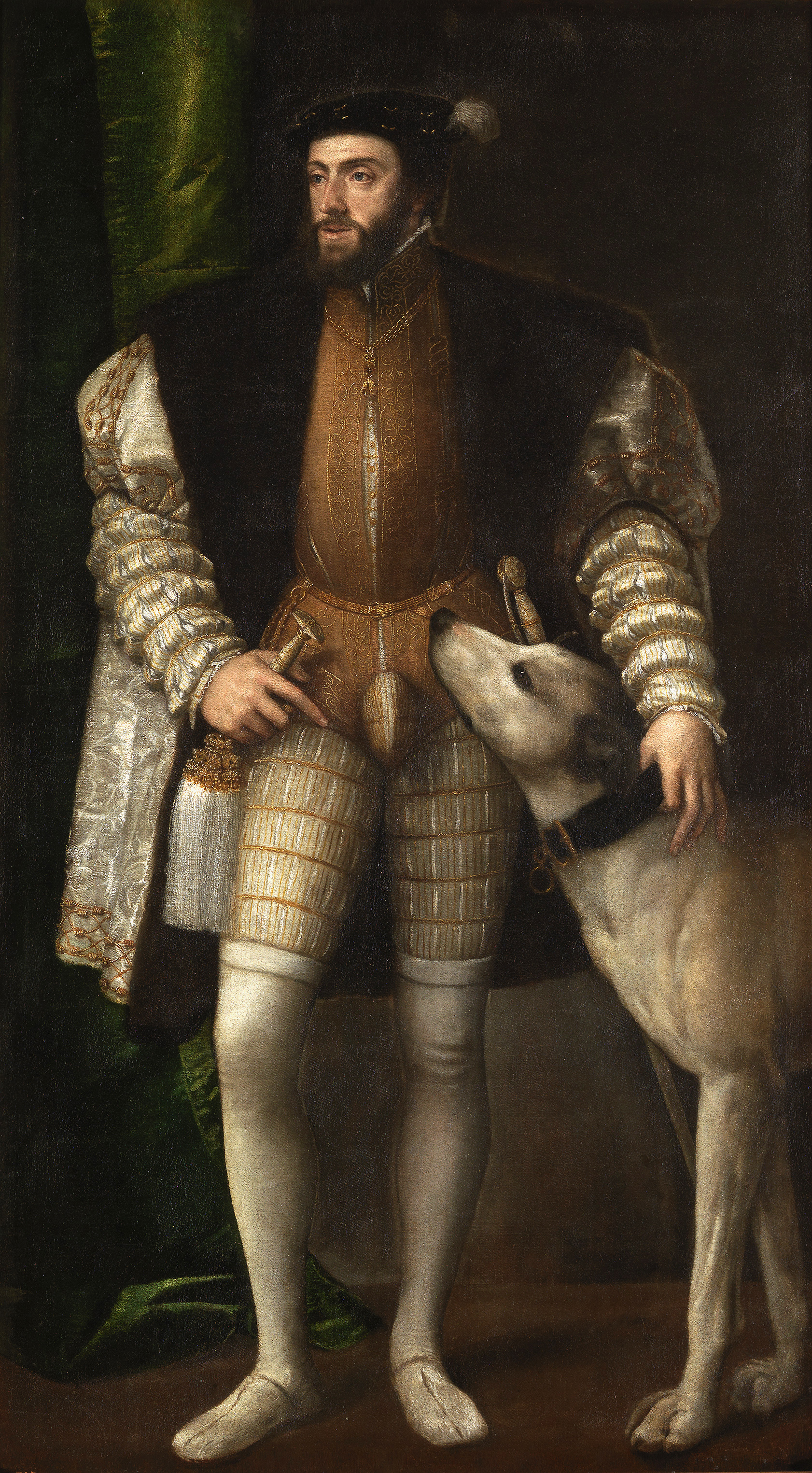
Titian's Portrait of Charles V with a dog, 1533

While Goya devotes a great deal of attention to his depiction of the king's sash and cloth, he emphasises his weakness in his rendering of a near-portly belly and indecisive stare. The art critic Robert Hughes describes a "big nosed face, framed in the tricorned hat like the head of an affable turtle poking from its shell". It is part of the Spanish national collection, now displayed in the Royal Palace of Madrid.

During his career, Goya depicted both father and son in hunting dress. The inspiration for the older man's outfit is probably taken from Velázquez's portrait of Philip IV, which the artist would have the opportunity to see as then court painter. Goya pays tribute to Titian's Portrait of Charles V with a dog by depicting a dog loyally sniffing at the royal crotch.

== Goya and the Bourbon kings ==
Goya had earlier been court painter to Charles III, who was widely viewed as the more astute political operator of the pair. While not lacking intelligence, Carlos IV is broadly seen as an idler compared to his father; ultimately, he was outmanoeuvred by Napoleon at a time when he was more interested in sport and hunting than affairs of state.

Goya had painted Charles III in 1780, when the artist himself was a young man. Although few of his thoughts survive for art historians, it is generally believed that the sentiment of later works such as Charles IV of Spain and His Family lend credence to the theory that he held his weakling King in little regard. Charles IV is rendered as portly and slightly confused, seemingly more suited to the role of a country gentleman than a regal, absolute head of state.

== Sources ==
- Boime. Albert. Art in an age of Bonapartism, 1800-1815. Chicago University Press, 1993. ISBN 0-226-06336-4
- Connell, Evan S. Francisco Goya: A Life. New York: Counterpoint, 2004. ISBN 1-58243-307-0
- Hagen, Rose-Marie & Hagen, Rainer. Francisco Goya, 1746-1828. Taschen, 2003. ISBN 3-8228-1823-2
- Hughes, Robert. Goya. New York: Alfred A. Knopf, 2004. ISBN 0-394-58028-1
