= Portrait of Charles V with a Dog =

1533 painting by Titian

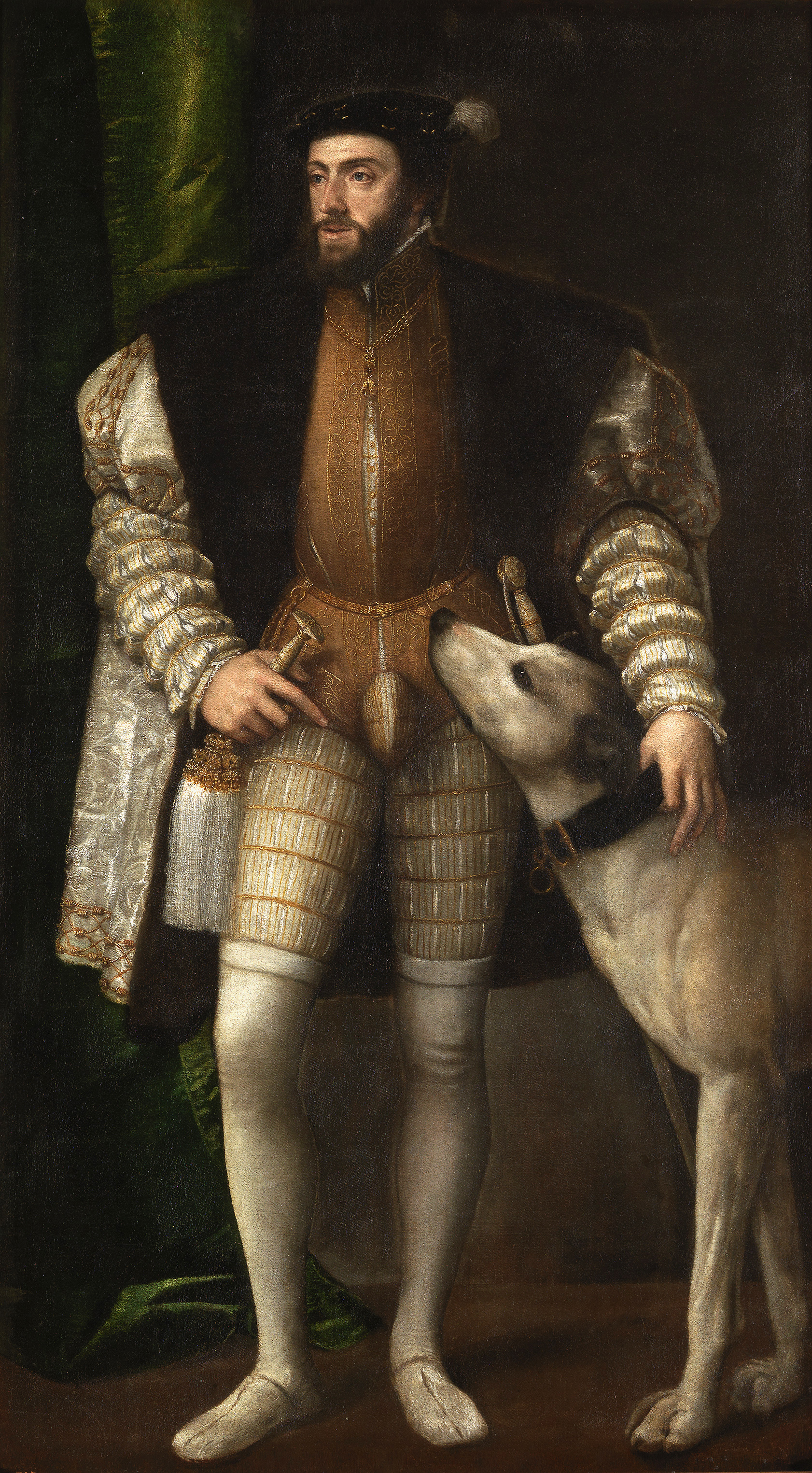
- Artist: Titian
- Year: 1533
- Medium: Oil on canvas
- Dimensions: 192 cm × 111 cm (76 in × 44 in)
- Location: Museo del Prado; Madrid

The Portrait of Charles V with a Dog is a portrait by Titian of Charles V, Holy Roman Emperor with a hunting dog, created in 1533. It passed from Charles to the Spanish royal collection, from which it came to the Museo del Prado, in Madrid.

== Description ==
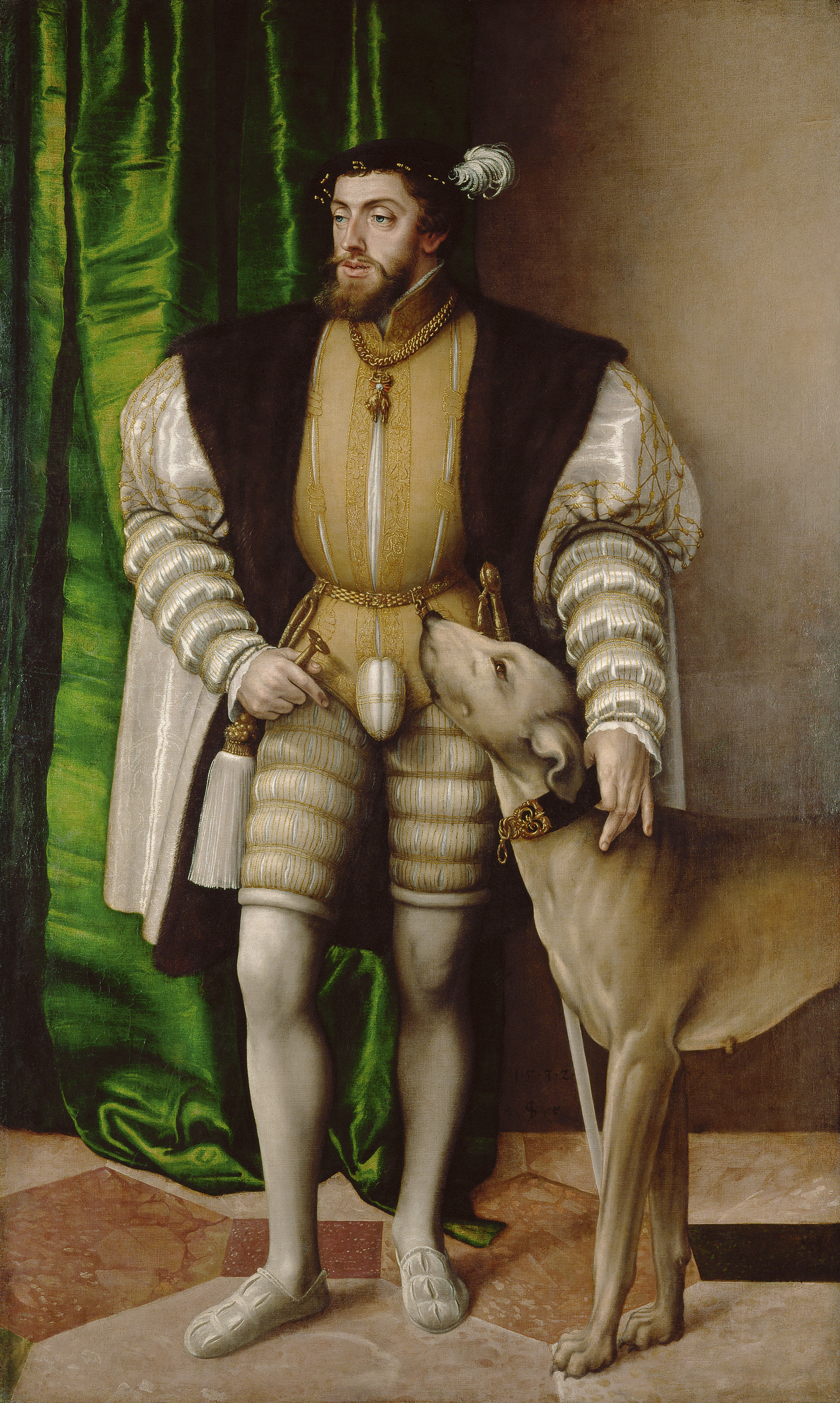
Seisenegger's original

It is a copy or reinterpretation of a portrait of the Emperor painted in 1532 by Jakob Seisenegger. That portrait was natural but had not pleased its subject and so during his stay in Bologna in 1533 (when Titian also happened to be there) Charles paid Titian 500 ducats to paint a new version of it.

This new version is similar to its predecessor but completely transforms its composition, stylising Charles' body by increasing the size of the fur wrap, decreasing the size of the doublet, raising the position of the eyes and lowering the horizon to make Charles fill the space. He is also shown approaching the viewer and the space around him has been emptied and simplified, with warmer colours than in the original. It later inspired Goya's 1799 Charles IV in his Hunting Clothes.

== See also ==
- List of works by Titian
