= The Waterseller of Seville =

Paintings by Diego Velázquez

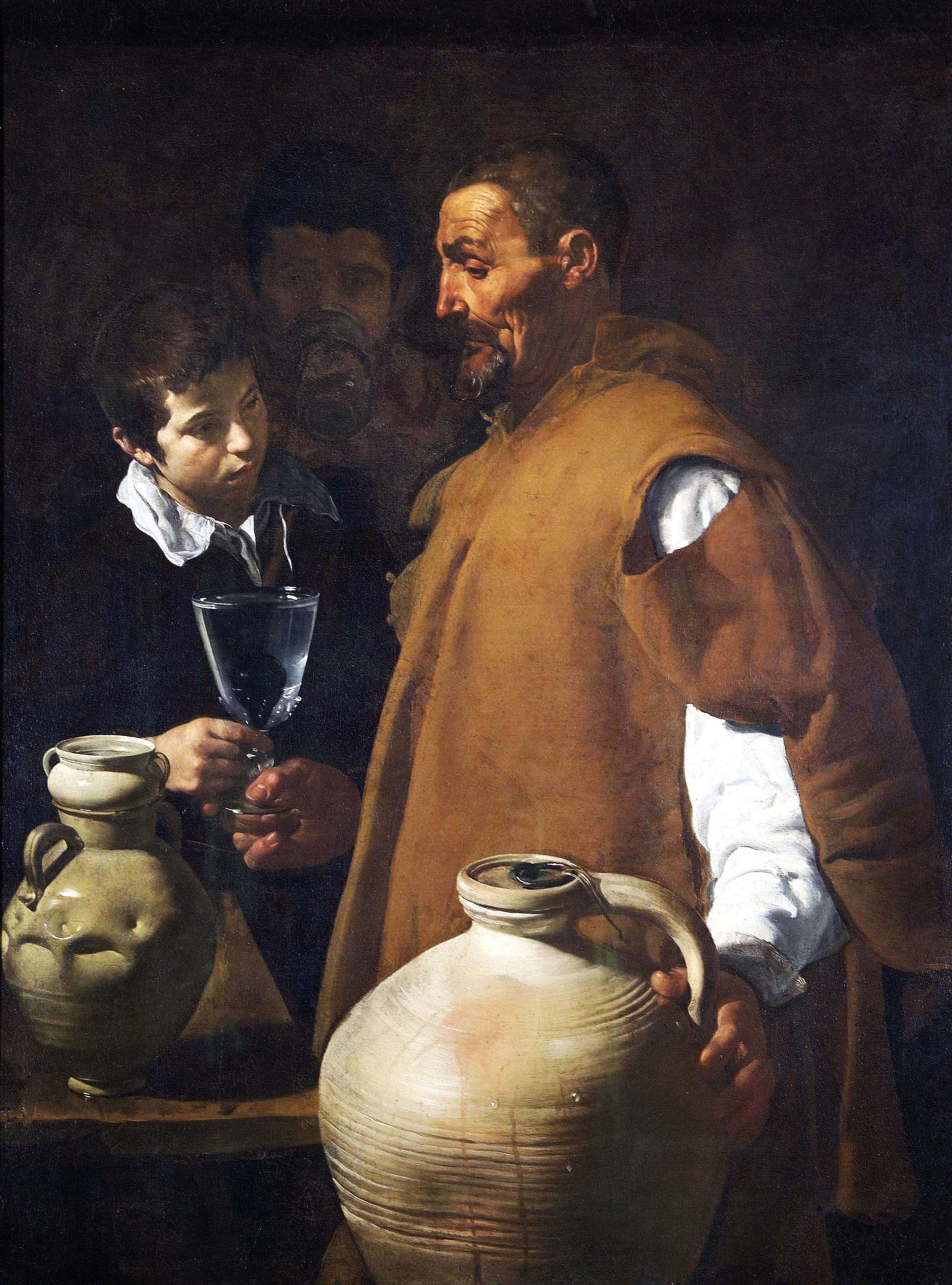
- Artist: Diego Velázquez
- Year: 1618–1622
- Medium: Oil on canvas
- Dimensions: 105 cm × 80 cm (41 in × 31 in)
- Location: Apsley House, London

The Waterseller of Seville
- Artist: Diego Velázquez
- Year: 1618
- Medium: Oil on canvas
- Dimensions: 104 cm × 75 cm (41 in × 30 in)
- Location: Uffizi, Florence

The Waterseller of Seville
- Artist: Diego Velázquez
- Year: 1620?
- Medium: Oil on canvas
- Dimensions: 100 cm × 79 cm (39 in × 31 in)
- Location: Walters Art Museum, Baltimore

The Waterseller of Seville is the title of three paintings by Spanish artist Diego Velázquez, dating from 1618–1622. The original version is considered to be among the finest works of the painter's Seville period and is displayed in the Wellington Collection of Apsley House. The original version was painted by Velázquez when he was in his late teens or early twenties. Looking at this painting, there is an older man, a young boy, and a bystander in the background. The old man is handing the young boy a glass of water, but they never look at each other, nor do they make eye contact with the viewer.

== History ==
According to José Gudiol, the Waterseller of Seville by Velázquez was painted shortly before moving to Madrid. Gudiol also classified this painting as a bodegón, due to the depiction of beverages. Art historians typically compare this painting to the still lifes that were painted during the seventeenth century in Spain because this painting is very simple with a limited color range and Velázquez was working with still objects. This painting is done in a realistic style with a limited color palette, another characteristic of the bodegón genre. According to Jon Moffitt, this piece was not a commissioned work.

== Description ==
The subject of the painting is the waterseller, a common trade for the lower classes in 17th century Seville. The jars and victuals recall bodegón paintings. The seller has two customers: a young boy (possibly painted from the same model as used for the boys in The Lunch and Old Woman Cooking Eggs), and a young man in the background shadows, (time has caused him to fade somewhat; he is clearer in the Uffizi version).

In the foreground sit the seller's gigantic pots of water, glistening with splashes of water. So large and rounded, they almost protrude out of the painting into the observer's space. The seller hands a freshly poured glass of water to the boy. In it sits a fig, a perfumer intended to make the water taste fresher (something still done in Seville today).

It is not known for sure, but it is assumed that the painting is being taken place either within a tavern or near one. The lighting enters the scene from the left and is brings attention to the young boy and to the water droplets on the pot of water. This demonstrates the detailed work of Velázquez's paintings.

The still, calm scene, a typical quality of his genre scenes and, indeed, much of Velázquez's work, is remarkable for the depiction of the seller. His pensive face, battered by its direct exposure to sunlight and deeply scarred with the wrinkles of age, speaks of long years of experience. His short shaved hair and old plain clothes give him the appearance of a monk, saint, or eccentric philosopher. The old man doesn't look at the young boy or even the other man in the shadows and he doesn't make eye contact with the audience either. The young boy is the same. He doesn't make eye contact with the old man, and his back is turned to the other man. And the young boy doesn't make eye contact with the viewer.

According to Antonio Palomino, the old man in the painting was old and very ill. He had torn clothing that revealed some skin and on that skin, there were warts. Beside the old man is young boy. The old man gives the young boy a glass of water and the young boy takes it without any form of acknowledgement.

== Theme ==
Velázquez's respect for the poor is evidence in the idea that the simple, elemental nature of poverty is profound and effective in depicting higher subjects and morals such as biblical stories (such as the Christ in the House of Martha and Mary). Even the slightest gestures are painted as if they were sacred acts. In the context of Velázquez's development as an artist, The Waterseller exhibits the beginnings of the technique found in the artist's mature creations. His insight into the person of the seller is symptomatic of his insight into the subjects of his great portraits, and his precise rendition of the small details of reality demonstrate his understanding of human perception. Also within the painting, the old man and the young boy both touch the same glass though they don't ever make eye contact. This could be because of their social status or even something as simple as their age difference.

== Influences ==
Another proponent of this simple color range was Caravaggio, who significantly influenced this painting. Caravaggio went against the idealistic trends of Mannerism and the Renaissance, painting saints and divine beings as fallible cripples and prostitutes. Whilst not as aggressively provocative as Caravaggio, Velázquez does not by any means idealize his subject. Rather, he aims to represent it in a way that is precisely faithful to life. He captures the imperfections of the seller's pots, the dampness on their sides, the glistening of the light on the small drops of water and the glass, and the realistic expressions of the characters.

Francisco Pacheco was not only Velázquez's teacher, but he was his father-in-law-too. Pacheco praised his son-in-law's bodegones paintings because they were not being given the credit that they should have been. Antonio Palomino, Velázquez's contemporary, was the first author ever to mention the painting and he claimed that the old man looked worse than he really did. However, this was not the first time Palomino was inaccurate in his descriptions of a painting by Velázquez. Palomino had already given a very inaccurate description of the painting An Old Woman Cooking Eggs.

== Versions ==
=== London Version ===
The painting by Velazquez is shown in three different paintings. The version in the Apsley House, London, United Kingdom, is the version that is most popular. It entered the Spanish Royal Collection. From the Buen Retiro Palace, it went to the Royal Palace of Madrid. There it was seen by Antonio Ponz and had won praise by Anton Raphael Mengs. It was stolen by Joseph Bonaparte at the time of the Napoleonic wars. Arthur Wellesley, 1st Duke of Wellington later won it back – along with 82 other paintings – at the Battle of Vitoria. The King of Spain allowed him to keep them in return for beating the French. Wellington brought the painting back to England where it remains to this day, in Apsley House, his former home as part of the Wellington Collection. This version is hung in the Waterloo Gallery in the museum side of the house.

=== Florence Version ===
The version in the Uffizi Gallery of Florence has a rather more burlesque feel, with the seller wearing an ornate red hat. The man in the back is more visible to the audience's eye. It has been suggested that this is earlier than the version in London.

This version of the painting is the dullest of them all. There is no shimmer to the pot like the other two have and the color scheme is very pale. This may have been more in line with Velázquez's contemporaries' expectations due to the comical and devious image of the waterseller given in picaresque novels of the time.

=== Baltimore Version ===
The third version, takes yet another angle on the waterseller. In this he appears almost despairing in his expression, perhaps to the extent of appearing farcical. The brilliant colours used are the most extreme of the three (with the pots taking on an altogether more shiny appearance). However, as in the Uffizi version, the characters lack the depth of personality present in the Wellington version. The man that was in the back of the other paintings is no longer visible and the background is shaded so the colors in the foreground really stand out, such as the pot and the man's red over piece that he is wearing.

== Details ==
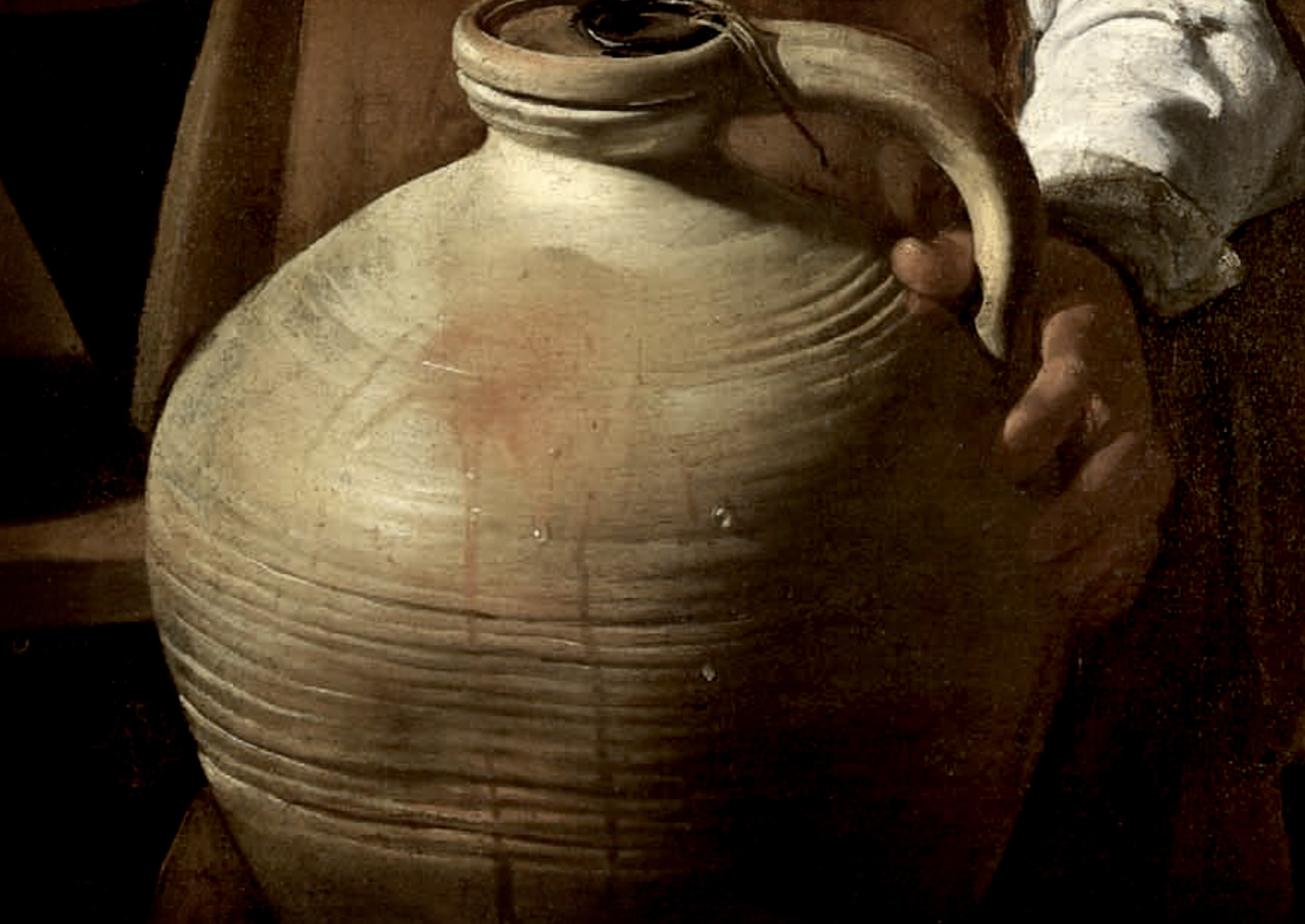
Water droplets on the clay jug.

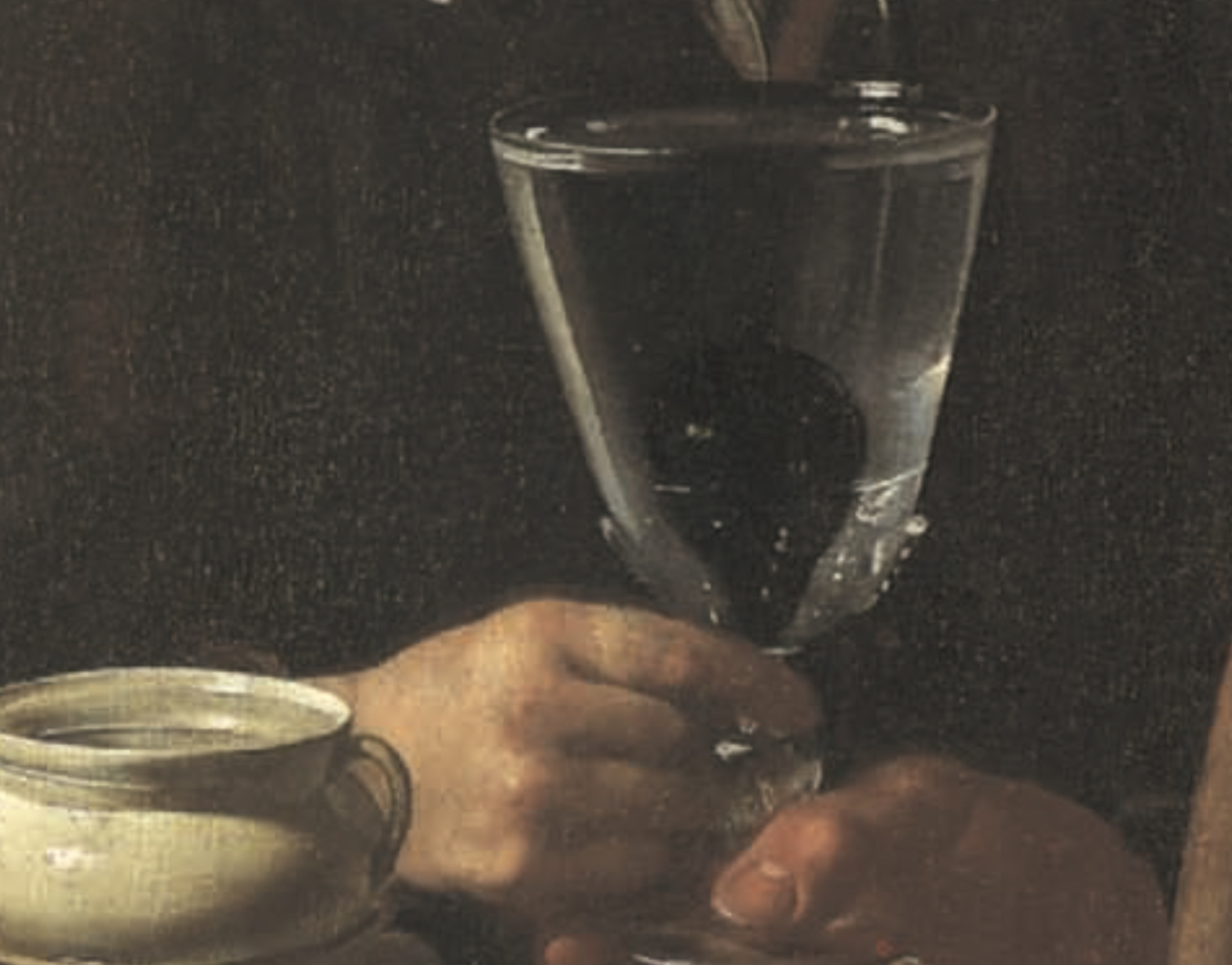
Subtle white highlights to show glass is full of water.

== See also ==
- List of works by Diego Velázquez

== Sources ==
- Gudiol José, et al. The Complete Paintings of Velázquez: 1599-1660. Greenwich House, 1983.
- Ortiz, Antonio Dominguez., et al. Velázquez. Metropolitan Mus Of Art, 2013.
- “Velázquez, The Waterseller of Seville.” Khan Academy, Khan Academy, https://www.khanacademy.org/humanities/monarchy-enlightenment/baroque-art1/spain/a/velzquez-the-waterseller-of-seville
- “Spanish Paintings Archives.” Wellington Collection, https://www.wellingtoncollection.co.uk/collection-category/spanish-paintings/
- Moffitt, John F. "Image and Meaning in Velázquez's Water-Carrier of Seville." New Mexico State University. http://revistes.ub.edu/index.php/trazaybaza/article/viewFile/27849/28710
