= Jakob Seisenegger =

Austrian painter

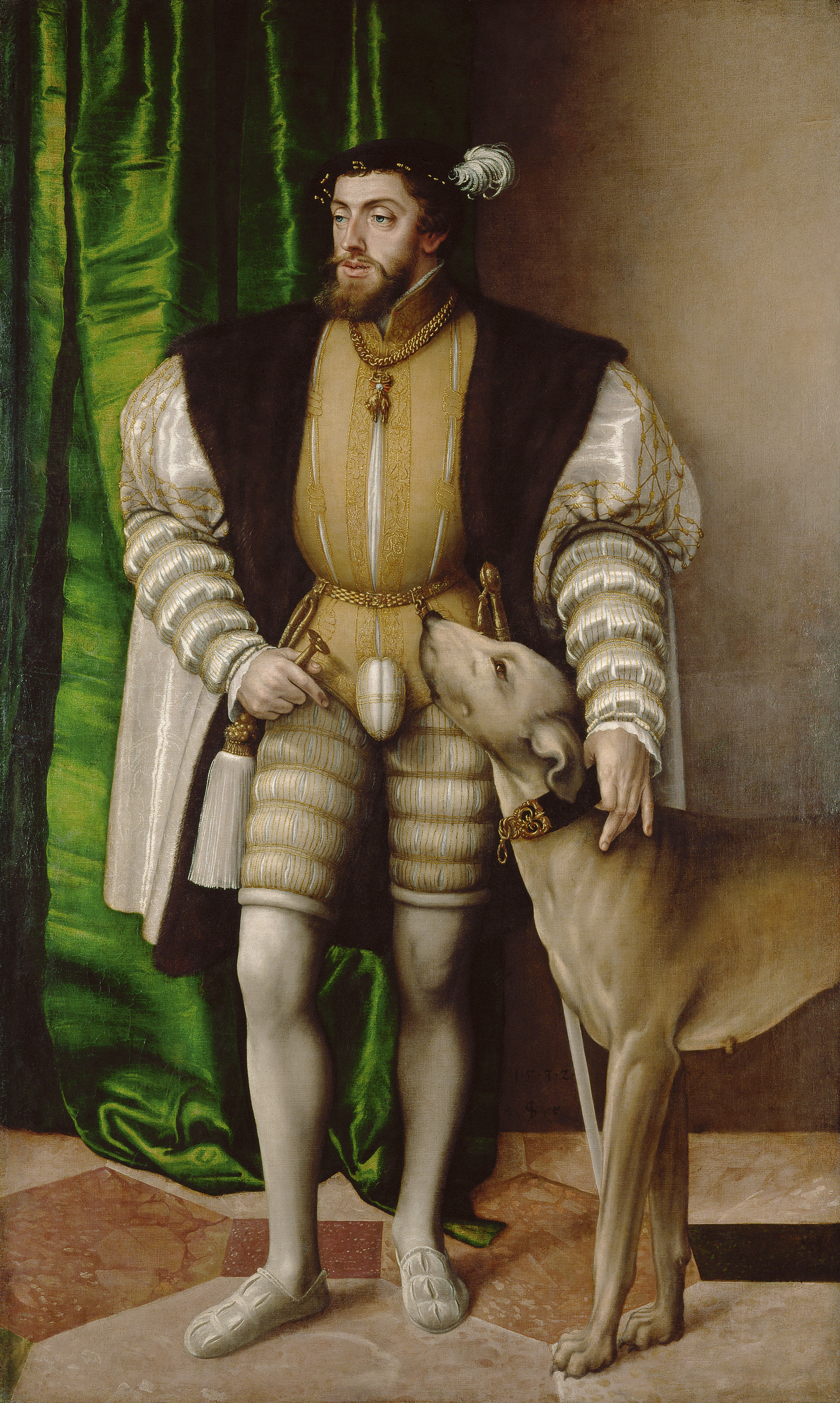
Emperor Charles V with Hound (1532).

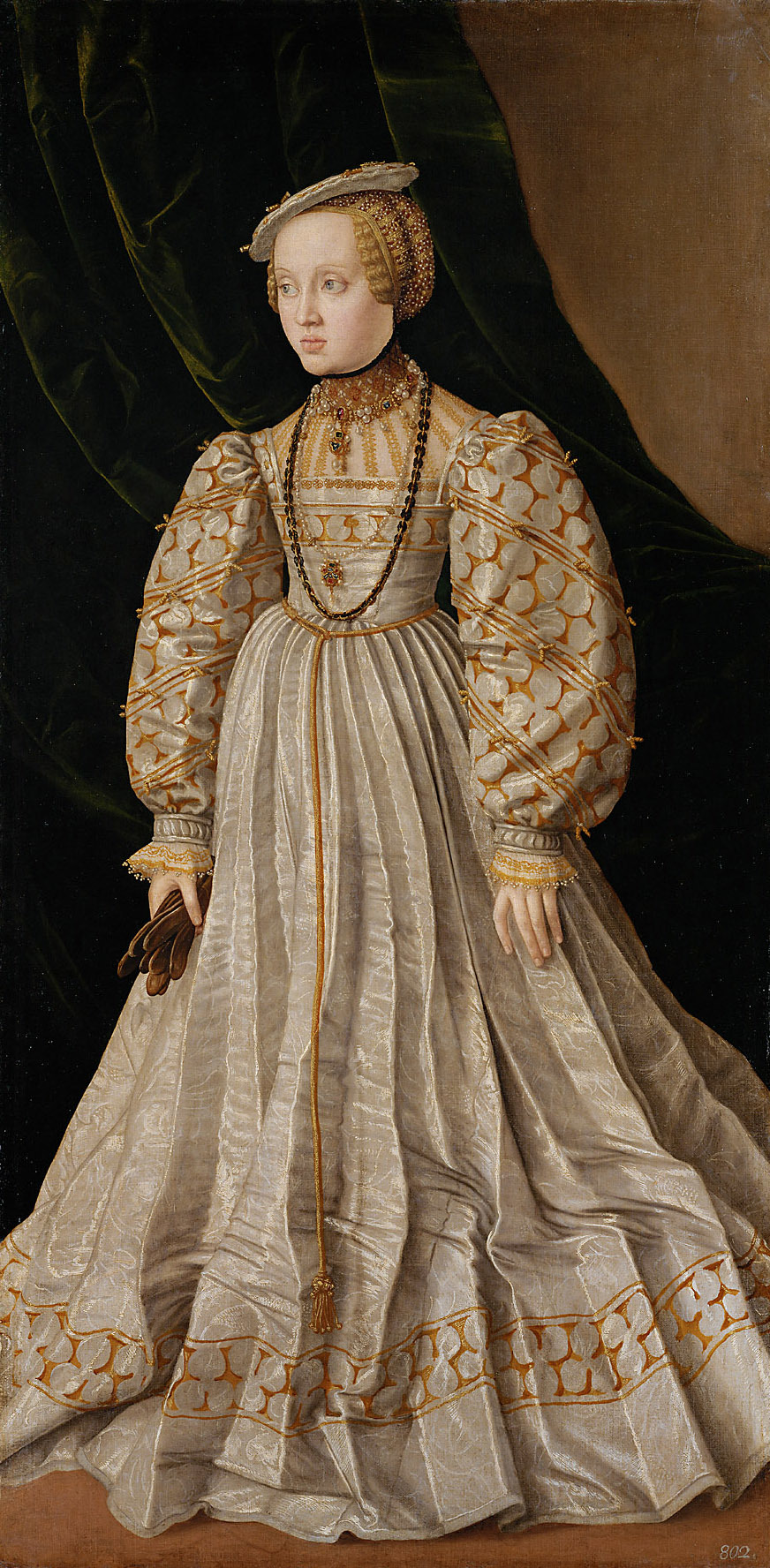
Archduchess Anna (c. 1545), Kunsthistorisches Museum

Jakob Seisenegger (1505–1567) was an Austrian portrait painter who was the court painter of Ferdinand I, Holy Roman Emperor. He also painted Ferdinand's brother Charles V. Most of his portraits are of the Austrian Habsburg family and their allies, including several of children.

He won international fame for his use of full-length poses in his portraits, creating a model used by future artists, such as François Clouet. His portrait Emperor Charles V with Hound (1532) is now in the Kunsthistorisches Museum Vienna.
