= Marquis of Caracena =

Marquisate of Caracena
- Creation date: 3 June 1624
- Created by: Philip IV
- Peerage: Spanish nobility
- First holder: Luis Francisco de Benvides y Carrillo de Toledo
- Last holder: Bernardino Fernández de Velasco Pacheco y Balfé
- Extinction date: 1916

The title of Marquis of Caracena (Spanish: Marquesado de Caracena is a Spanish title of nobility bestowed in 1624 by King Philip IV of Spain on Luis Carrillo de Toledo whom he had elevated from the title of Count of Caracena which King Philip III of Spain had previously granted in 1599. The 1st Marquis of Caracena was also later created as Count of Pinto.

The title is toponymic, named after the municipality of Caracena in the province of Soria.
