= Apsley House =

London townhouse of the Dukes of Wellington

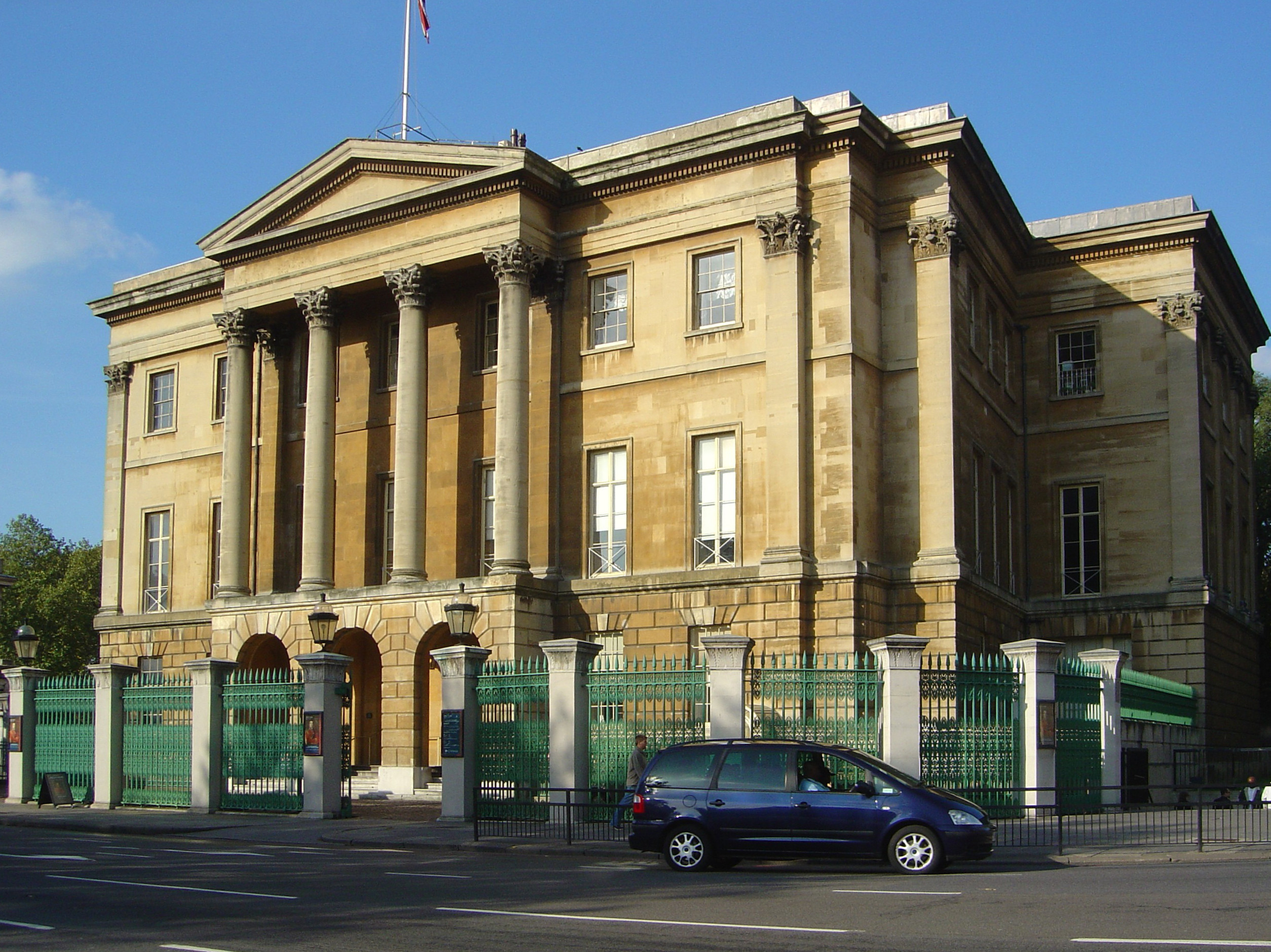
- The front of Apsley House in 2005

- Location within Central London

General information
- Architectural style: Neo-classical
- Location: 149 Piccadilly; London, W1, United Kingdom
- Coordinates: 51°30′13″N 0°09′06″W
- Client: Henry Bathurst, Lord Apsley; Arthur Wellesley, 1st Duke of Wellington

Design and construction
- Architects: Robert Adam (original building); Benjamin Dean Wyatt (19th-century renovations)

Website
- www.wellingtoncollection.co.uk

Listed Building – Grade I
- Reference no.: 1226873

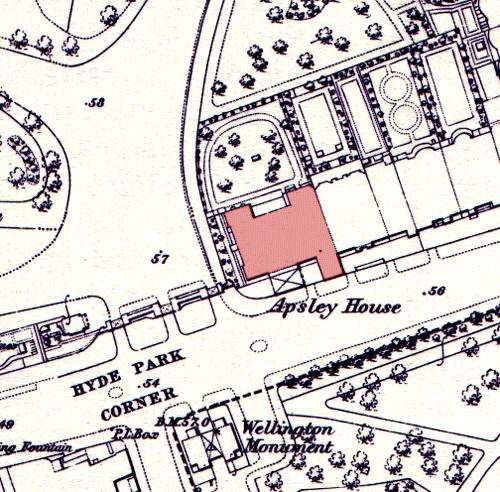
Apsley House on an 1869 map. The neighbouring houses were demolished in the post-World War II period to allow Park Lane to be widened. The Wellington Arch has also been repositioned since this time.

Apsley House is the London townhouse of the Dukes of Wellington. It stands alone at Hyde Park Corner, on the south-east corner of Hyde Park, facing towards the large traffic roundabout in the centre of which stands the Wellington Arch. It is a Grade I listed building.

Designed by Robert Adam in the neoclassical style, the house was built for Lord Apsley in the 1770s. It was purchased by Richard Wellesley, in 1807, and passed to his younger brother Arthur, the 1st duke, in 1817. It was sometimes referred to as Number One, London. It is perhaps the only preserved example of an English aristocratic townhouse from this period.

The house is also called the Wellington Museum, its official designation under the Wellington Museum Act 1947. Run by English Heritage, much of the house is open to the public as a museum and art gallery, exhibiting the Wellington Collection, a large collection of paintings, other artworks and memorabilia of the career of the 1st Duke. The 9th Duke of Wellington retains an apartment spanning the northern half of the ground floor of the house for the Wellesley family's private use. The practice has been to maintain the public rooms as far as possible in the original style and decor of the 1st Duke.

== History ==
Apsley House stands at the site of an old lodge that belonged to the crown. During the Interregnum newer buildings were erected between what is now Old Park Lane and Hyde Park Corner. In the 1600s after the Restoration they were leased by James Hamilton (died 1673) and renewed by Elizabeth his widow in 1692 on a 99-year lease (Hamilton Place takes its name from that family). Immediately before Apsley House was built the site was occupied by a tavern called the Hercules Pillars (immortalised by Henry Fielding in The History of Tom Jones, a Foundling as the location where Squire Western resides when he first journeys up to London).

The house was originally built in red brick by Robert Adam between 1771 and 1778 for Lord Apsley, the Lord Chancellor, who gave the house its name. Some Adam interiors survive: the Piccadilly Drawing Room with its apsidal end and Adam fireplace, and the Portico Room, behind the giant Corinthian portico added by Wellington.

The house was given the popular nickname of Number One, London, since it was the first house passed by visitors who travelled from the countryside after the toll gates at Knightsbridge. It was originally part of a contiguous line of great houses on Piccadilly, demolished to widen Park Lane: its official address remains 149 Piccadilly, W1J 7NT.

In 1807 the house was purchased by Richard Wellesley, the elder brother of Arthur Wellesley, but in 1817 financial difficulties forced him to sell it to his brother, the Duke of Wellington, who needed a London base from which to pursue his career in politics.

Wellington employed the architect Benjamin Dean Wyatt to carry out renovations in two phases: in the first, begun in 1819, he added a three-storey extension to the north east, housing a State Dining Room, bedrooms and dressing rooms. The scagliola ornamentations, that resemble marble inlays, were produced in Coade stone from the Coade Ornamental Stone Manufactory in Lambeth.

The second phase, started after Wellington had become Prime Minister in 1828, included a new staircase and the "Waterloo Gallery" on the west side of the house. The red-brick exterior was clad in Bath stone, and a pedimented portico added. Wyatt's original estimate for the work was £23,000, but the need to repair structural defects discovered during the work led to costs escalating to more than £61,000. Wyatt introduced his own version of French style to the interior, notably in the Waterloo Gallery and the florid wrought iron stair-rail, described by Pevsner as "just turning from Empire to a neo-Rococo". Iron shutters and railings were also added to the house after the windows had been smashed during riots.

The Waterloo Gallery is named after the Duke's victory over Napoleon at the Battle of Waterloo. The Waterloo Banquet was held annually to commemorate the victory of 18 June 1815. The first banquets were held in the Dining Room but in 1828 when Wyatt completed the Waterloo Gallery the banquet was moved there and became a much larger event, seating 74 as opposed to 36 in the dining room. The Duke's equestrian statue can be seen across the busy road, cloaked and watchful, the plinth guarded at each corner by an infantryman. This statue was cast from guns captured at the battle.

Wellington Museum Act 1947 (Note: Section 10.)
- Act of Parliament
- Parliament of the United Kingdom
- Long title: An Act to transfer to the Crown Apsley House and the site, forecourt and garden thereof and certain chattels formerly belonging to the first Duke of Wellington; to provide for the use of Apsley House partly as a museum for the preservation and exhibition of the said chattels and other chattels associated with the said first Duke or his times and for other public purposes, and partly as a residence for the Dukes of Wellington; to amend the enactments relating to the Wellington estates, so as to provide for the automatic devolution of the property subject to the trusts thereof whenever there is a change in the person holding office as First Lord of the Treasury, Chancellor of the Exchequer or Speaker of the House of Commons; and for purposes connected with the matters aforesaid.
- Citation: 10 & 11 Geo. 6. c. 46
- Territorial extent: United Kingdom

Dates
- Royal assent: 31 July 1947
- Commencement: 31 July 1947 (Note: The Acts of Parliament (Commencement) Act 1793.)
Other legislation
Amended by	Statute Law Revision Act 1960; Wellington Estate Act 1972; Finance Act 1982; Statute Law (Repeals) Act 1993

Status: Amended

Text of statute as originally enacted

Text of the Wellington Museum Act 1947 as in force today (including any amendments) within the United Kingdom, from legislation.gov.uk.

Gerald Wellesley, 7th Duke of Wellington, gave the house and its most important contents to the nation in 1947, whilst retaining the right to occupy part of the building. The house was refurbished by the Ministry of Works, with old gas lighting removed and replaced by electricity, and the house was opened as a museum in 1952 as part of the Victoria and Albert Museum. By the 21st century relations between the Wellington family and the museum had deteriorated, and in 2004 responsibility for the house was transferred to English Heritage, although this was not the outcome favoured by the family.

Apsley House is a Grade I listed building. Its gates and railings have a separate Grade I listing.

=== Private apartment ===
The Wellington Museum Act 1947 (10 & 11 Geo. 6. c. 46) preserves the right of the Wellesley family to retain a private residence within part of Apsley House "so long as there is a Duke of Wellington".

According to Lady Jane Wellesley, following the accession of her father Valerian Wellesley, 8th Duke of Wellington to the Dukedom in 1972, he and his wife Diana occupied part of the house situated on the ground floor which originally formed the private apartments of the first Duke. This corroborates electrical plans of the House dating from the 1980s, which show the private sections of the house on the northern half of the building's ground floor.

== Gallery ==
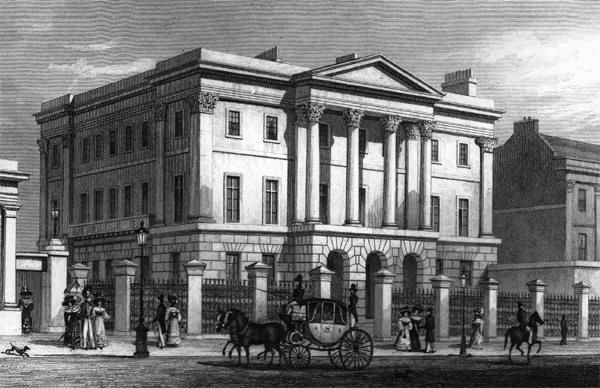
Apsley House in 1829 by Thomas H. Shepherd. The main gateway to Hyde Park can be glimpsed on the left.

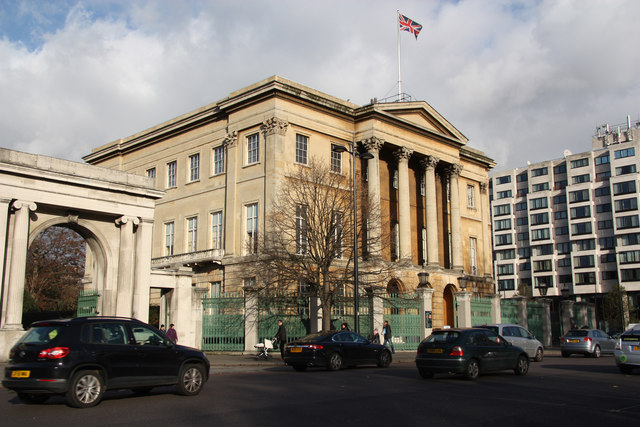
Apsley House next to the gate

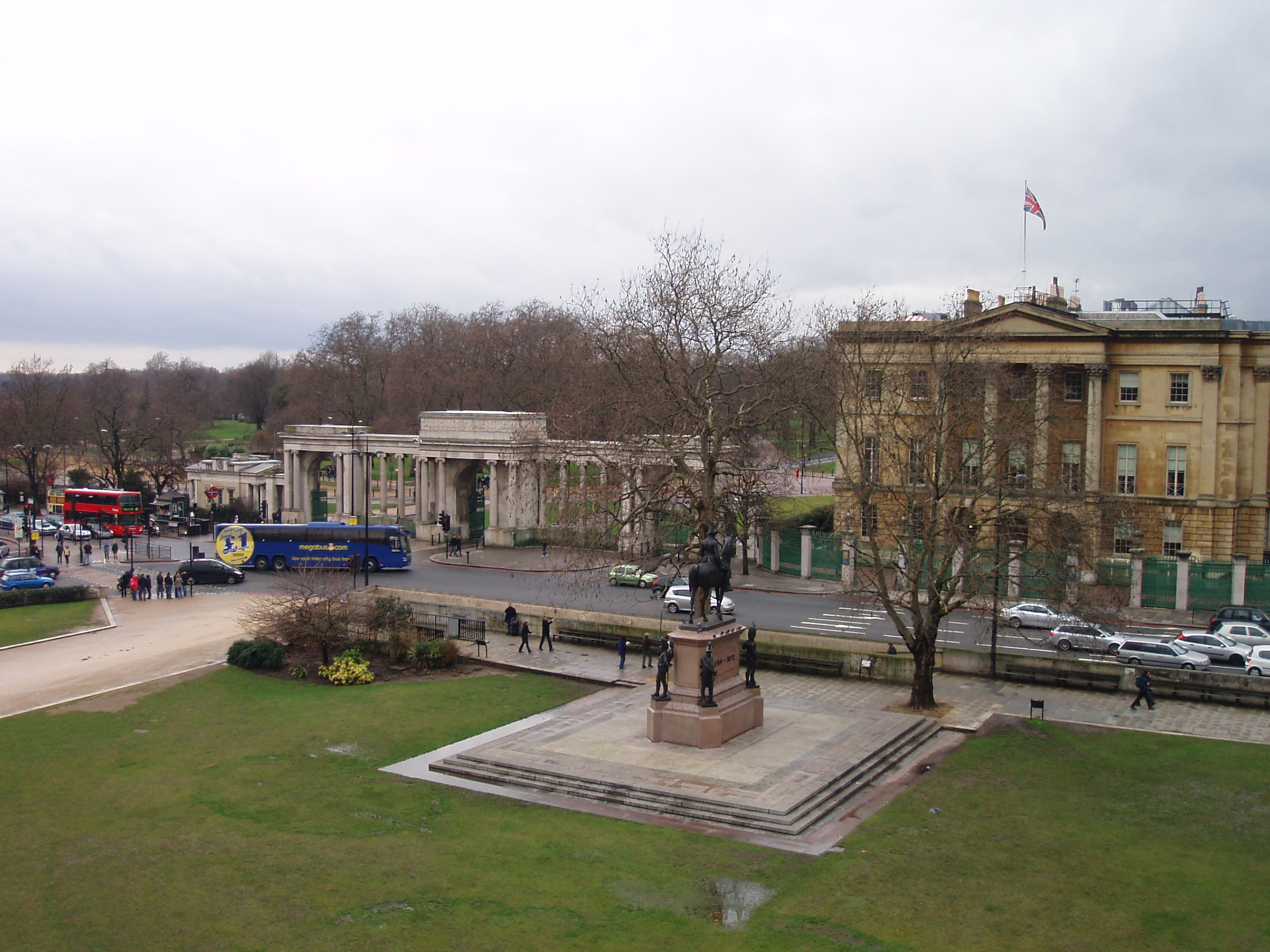
The statue of the Duke of Wellington facing Apsley House. Hyde Park Corner to the left.

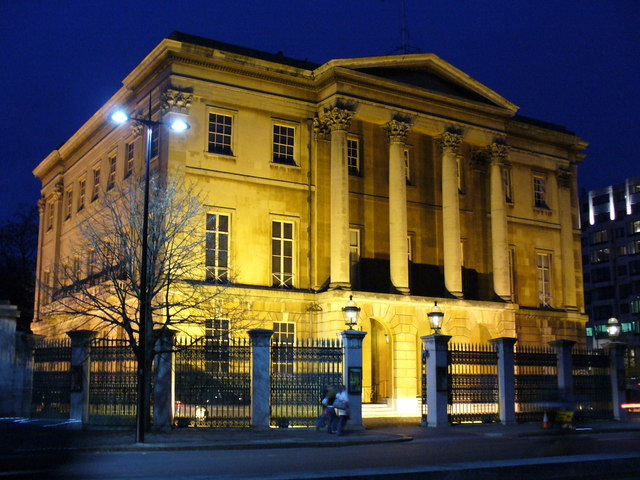
Apsley House at night
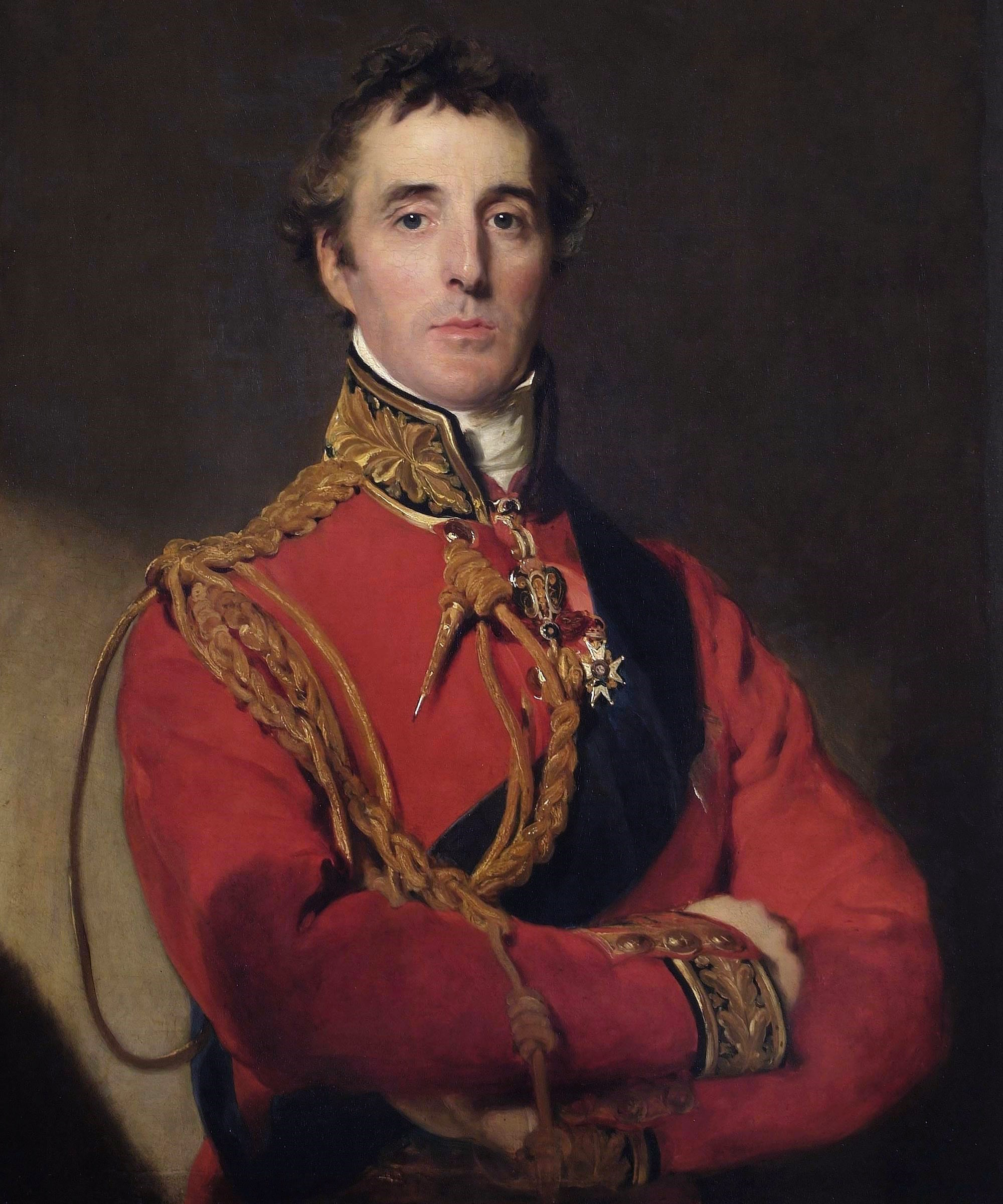
Portrait of the Duke of Wellington, by Thomas Lawrence (c. 1815–16)

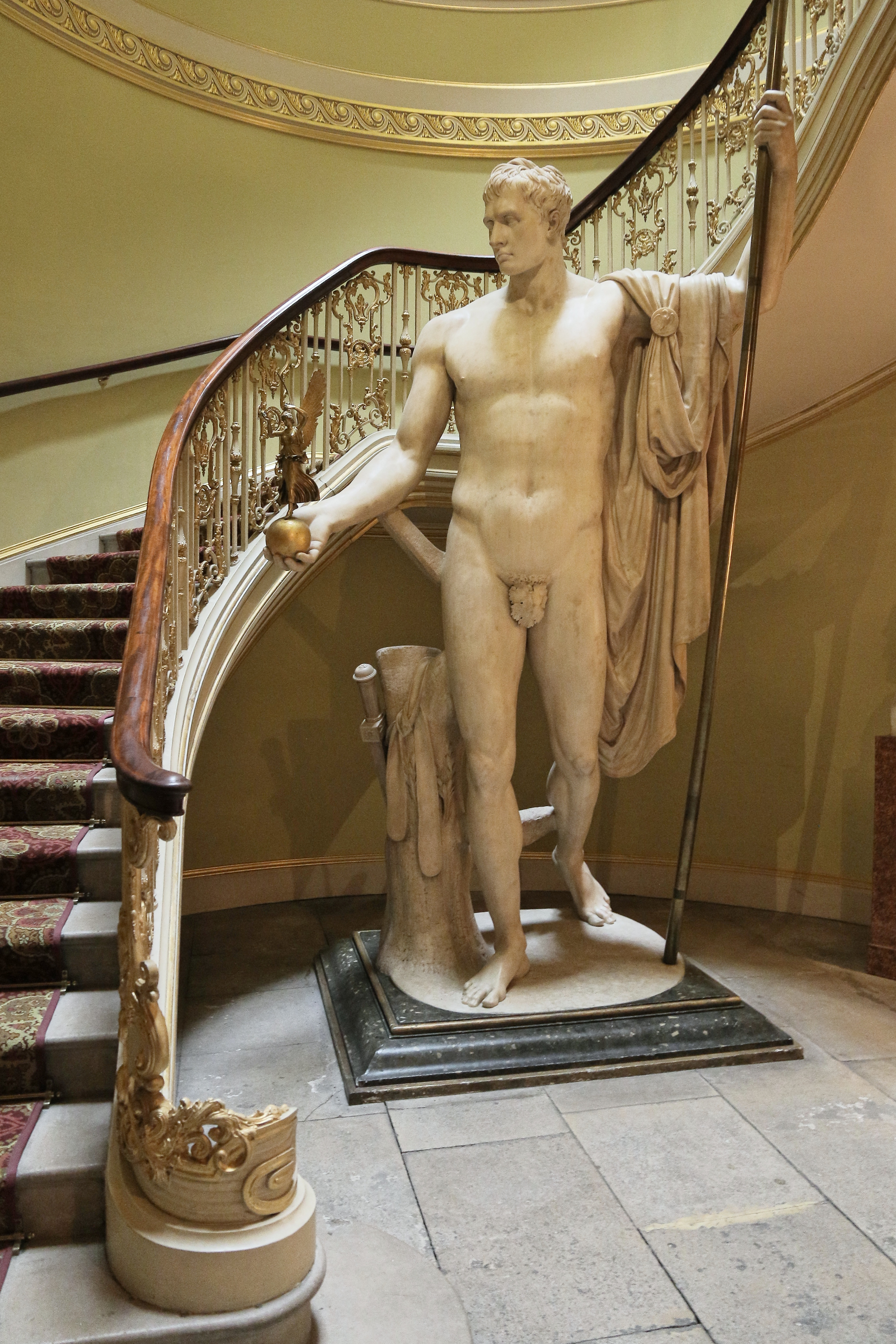
Antonio Canova's statue of Napoleon as Mars the Peacemaker (1806)

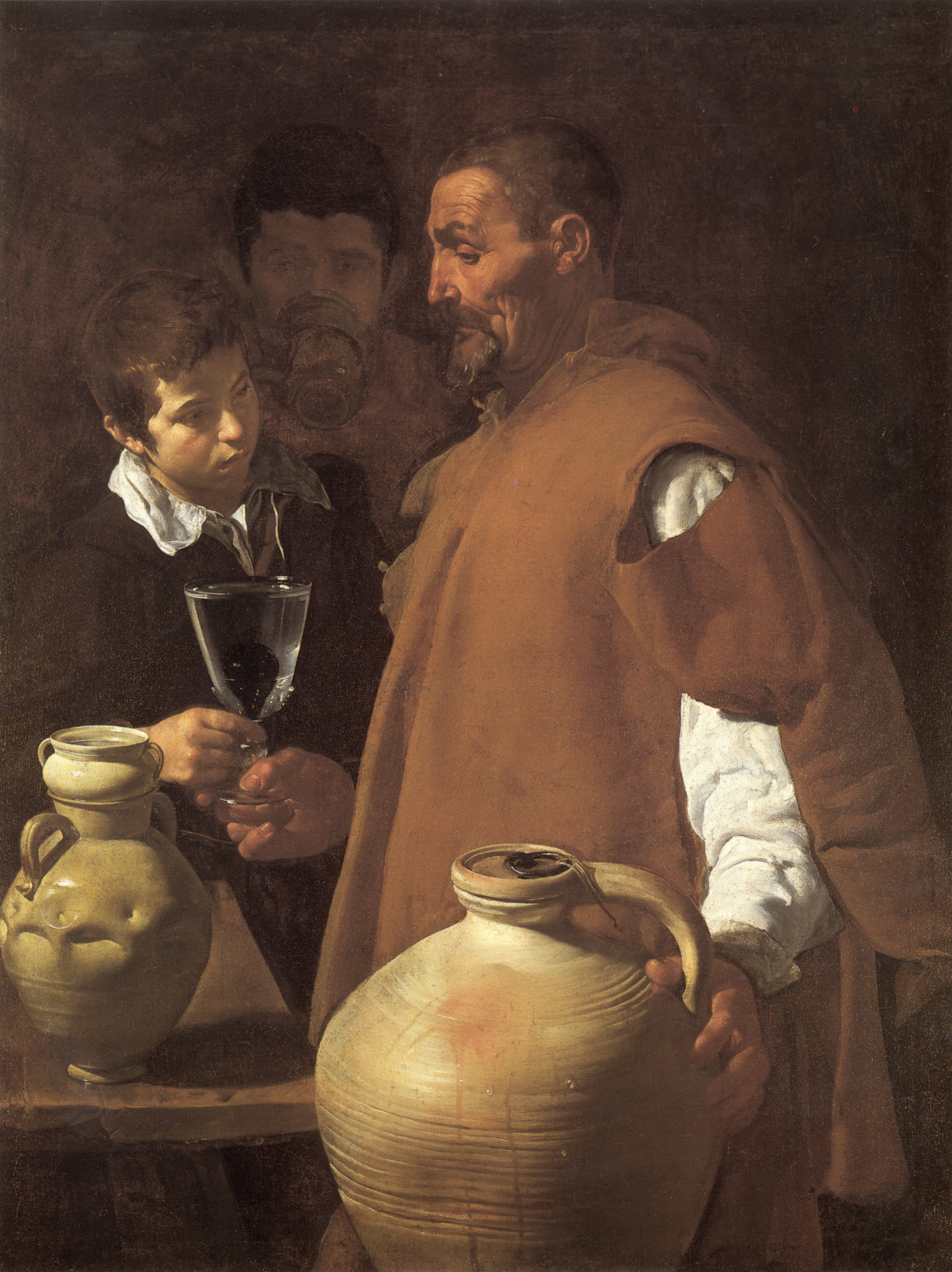
Diego Velázquez's Waterseller of Seville (1623)

== See also ==
- List of monuments to Arthur Wellesley, 1st Duke of Wellington
- Stratfield Saye House – the country home of the Dukes of Wellington
- Walmer Castle – the residence of the 1st Duke as Lord Warden of the Cinque Ports
- Waterloo ceremony
- Wellington Museum, Somerset
- Wellington Museum, Waterloo
