= Jokel =

Jokel may refer to:

- Jokel Bay, bay in NE Greenland
- Borg Jokel, a glacier in NE Greenland
- J-ok'el, a 2007 Mexican horror movie
- Jaroslav Jokeľ, Slovak weightlifter
- Oliver Jokeľ, Slovak ice-hockey player

== See also ==
- Joeckel
- Jökull (disambiguation)
