= Stations of the Cross =

Series of images depicting Jesus Christ on the day of his crucifixion

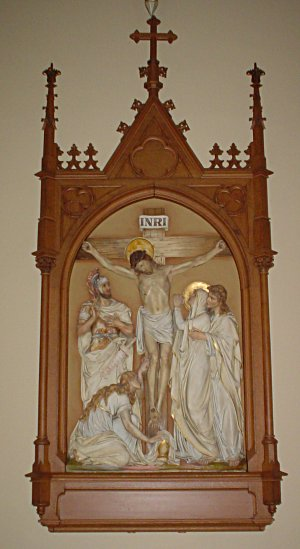
The 12th Station of the Cross: Jesus dies on the Cross – St. Raphael's Cathedral (Dubuque, Iowa)

The Stations of the Cross or the Way of the Cross, also known as the Way of Sorrows, the Via Crucis or the Via Dolorosa, are any series of fourteen images depicting Jesus Christ on the day of his crucifixion and accompanying prayers. These fourteen stations are derived from the imitations of the Via Dolorosa of Old Jerusalem which is a traditional processional route symbolizing the path Jesus walked from the Lions' Gate to Mount Calvary. The objective of the stations is to help the faithful to make a spiritual pilgrimage through contemplation of the Passion of Christ. It has become one of the most popular devotions and these stations can be originated from many Western Christian churches, including those in the Latin Catholic, Lutheran, Anglican and Methodist traditions.

Commonly, a series of 14 images will be arranged in numbered order along a path, along which worshippers—individually or in a procession—move in order, stopping at each station to say prayers and engage in reflections associated with that station. These devotions are most common during Lent, especially on Good Friday, and reflect a spirit of reparation for the sufferings and insults that Jesus endured during his passion. As a physical devotion involving standing, kneeling and genuflections, the Stations of the Cross are tied with the Christian themes of repentance and mortification of the flesh.

The style, form, and placement of the stations vary widely. The typical stations are small plaques with reliefs or paintings placed around a church nave. Modern minimalist stations can be simple crosses with a numeral in the centre. Occasionally, the faithful might say the stations of the cross without there being any image, such as when the pope leads the stations of the cross around the Colosseum in Rome on Good Friday.

== History ==
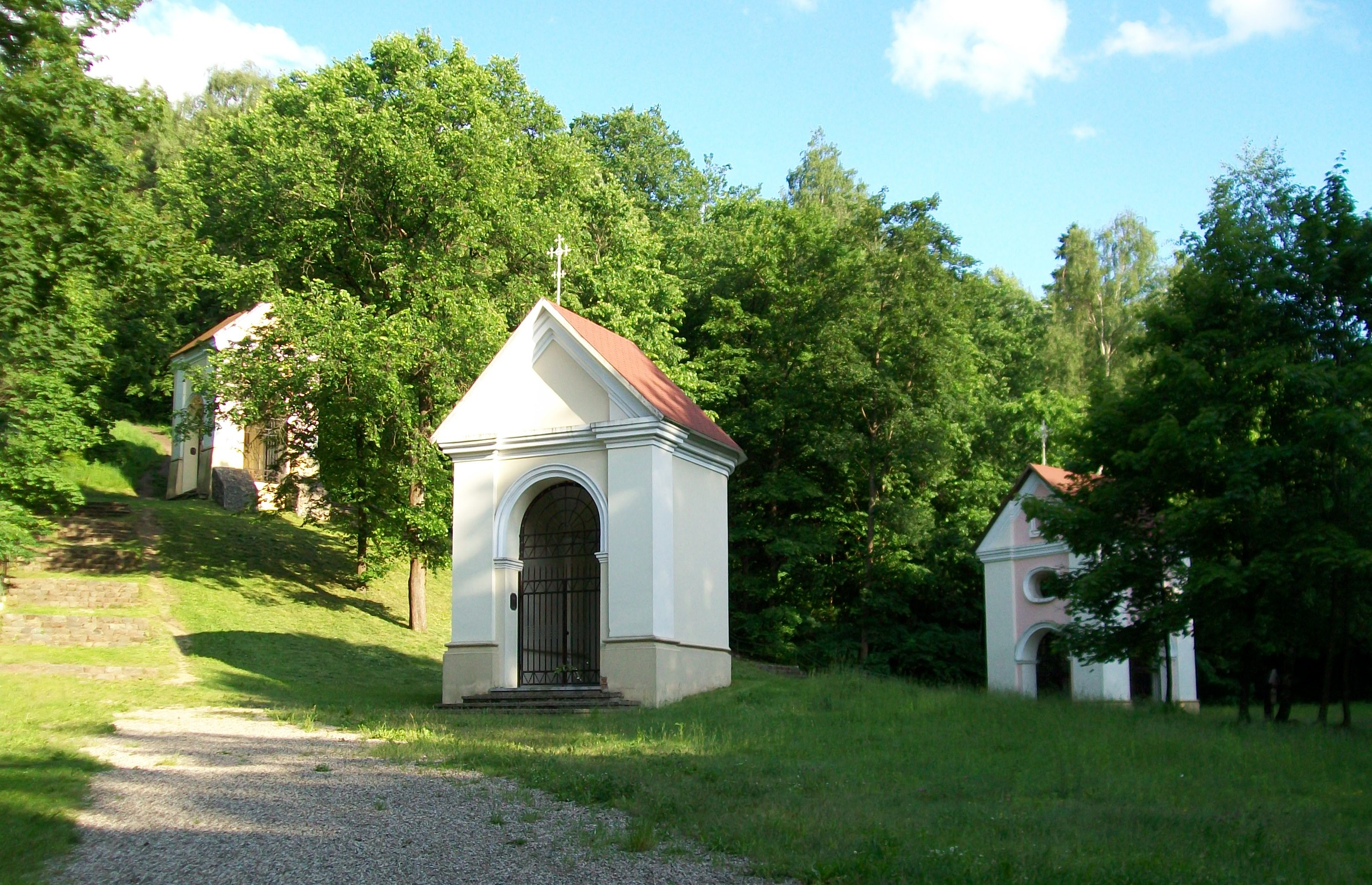
Three chapels of Verkiai Calvary

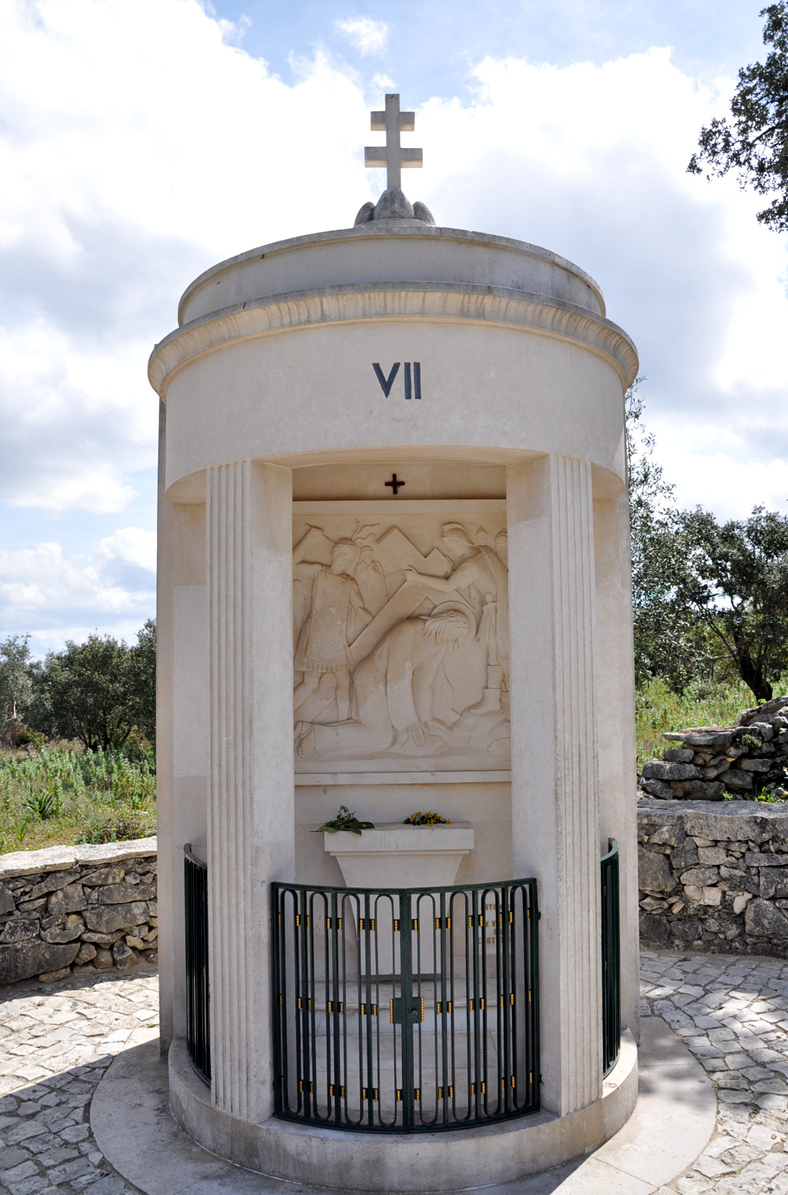
Station of the Cross near the Shrine of Our Lady of Fátima, in Portugal

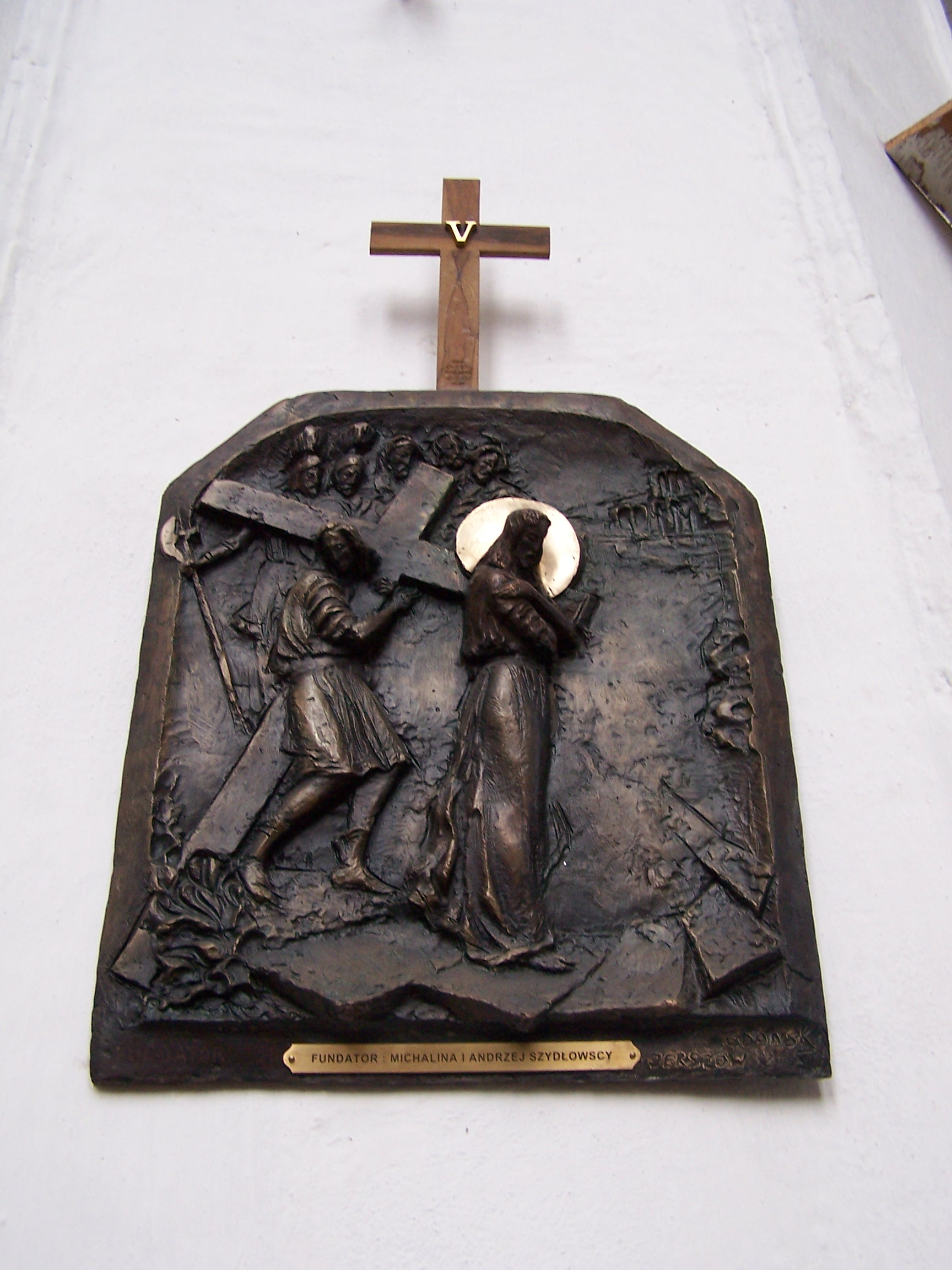
5th station of the Cross (Simon of Cyrene helps Jesus carry the Cross) by Gennadiy Jerszow in Basilica of the Assumption of the Virgin Mary. Gdańsk, Poland

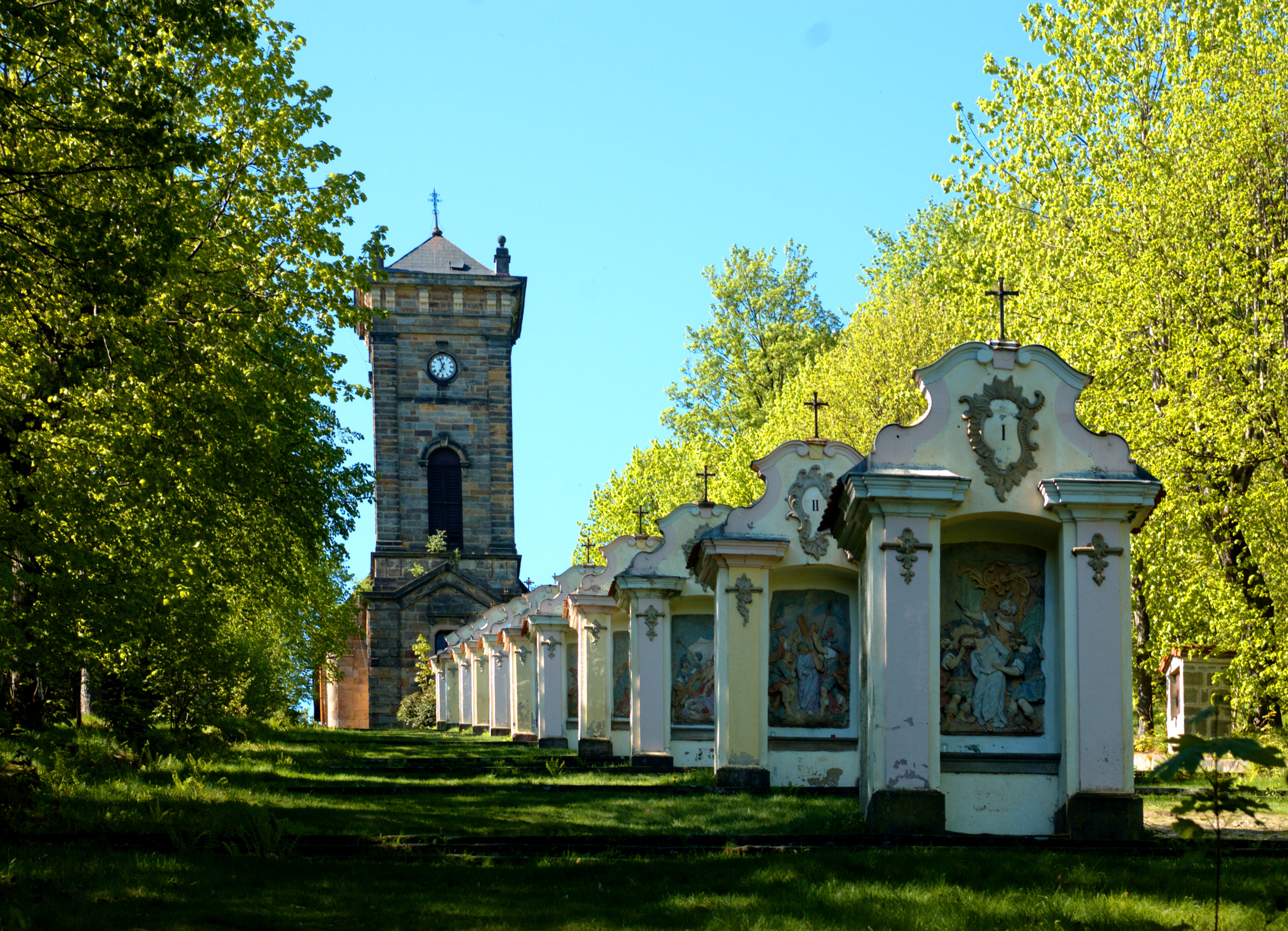
Outdoor stations in Jiřetín pod Jedlovou

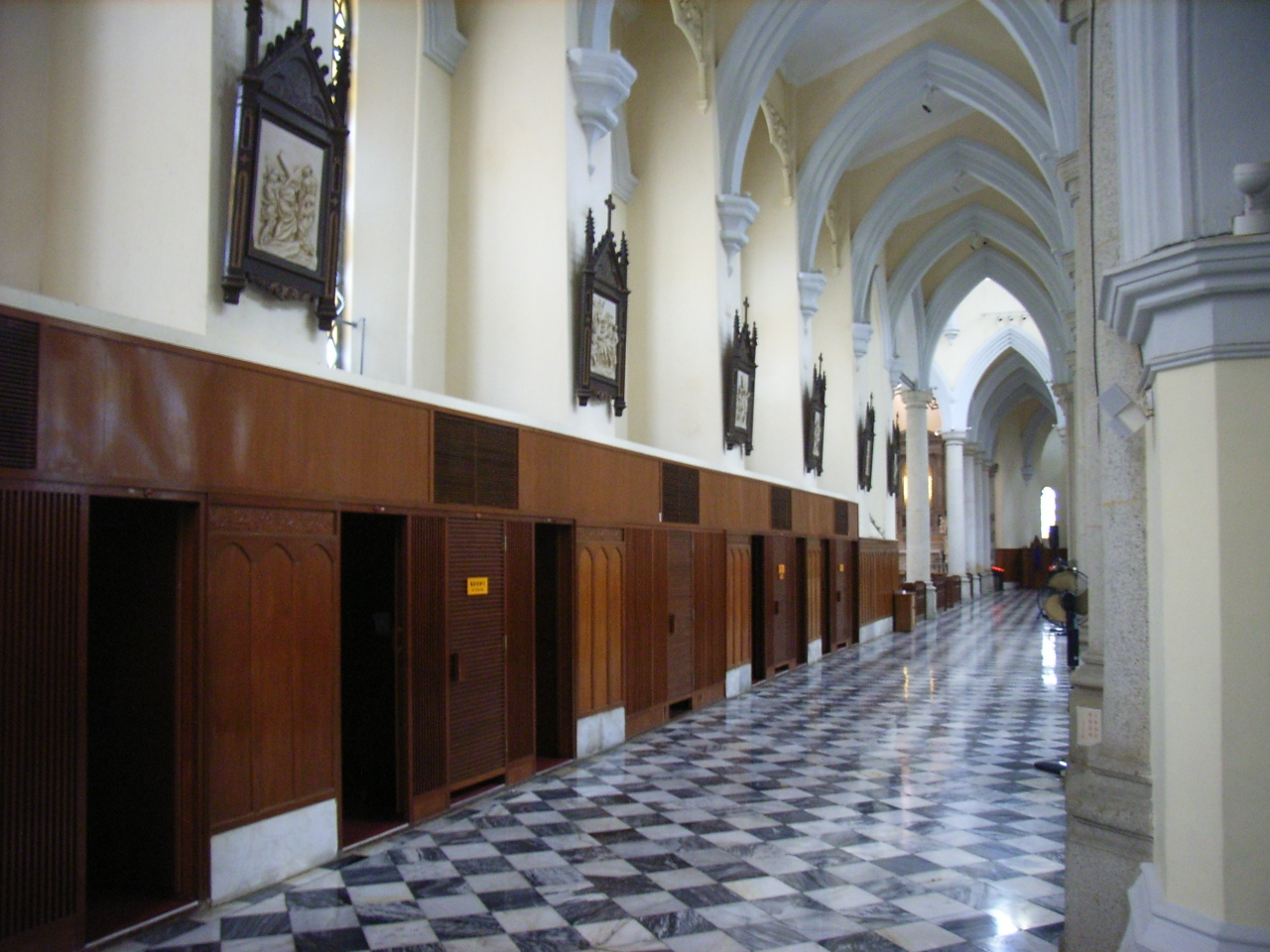
Typical indoor placement along the nave (Hong Kong Catholic Cathedral of the Immaculate Conception)

The Stations of the Cross originated from the pilgrimage to Jerusalem in Roman Judaea and a desire to reproduce the Via Dolorosa. Imitating holy places was not a new concept. For example, the religious complex of Santo Stefano in Bologna, Italy, replicated the Church of the Holy Sepulchre and other religious sites in Palestine, including the Mount of Olives and the Valley of Josaphat.

Following the siege of 1187, Jerusalem fell to the forces of Saladin, the first sultan of Egypt and Syria. Forty years later, members of the Franciscan religious order were allowed back into the Holy Land. Their founder, Francis of Assisi, held the Passion of Christ in special veneration and is said to have been the first person to receive stigmata. In 1217, Francis also founded the Custody of the Holy Land to guard and promote the devotion to Christian holy places. The Franciscans' efforts were recognized when Pope Clement VI officially proclaimed them the custodians of holy places in 1342. Although several travelers who visited the Holy Land during the 12–14th centuries (e.g. Riccoldo da Monte di Croce, Burchard of Mount Sion, and James of Verona), mention a "Via Sacra", i.e. a settled route that pilgrims followed, there is nothing in their accounts to identify this with the Way of the Cross, as we understand it. The earliest use of the word "stations", as applied to the accustomed halting-places along the Via Sacra at Jerusalem, occurs in the narrative of an English pilgrim, William Wey, who visited the Holy Land in the mid-15th century and described pilgrims following the footsteps of Christ to Golgotha. In 1521, a book called Geystlich Strass ("spiritual road") was printed with illustrations of the stations in the Holy Land.

During the 15th and 16th centuries, the Franciscans began to build a series of outdoor shrines in Europe to duplicate their counterparts in the Holy Land. The number of stations at these shrines varied between seven and thirty; seven was common. These were usually placed, often in small buildings, along the approach to a church, as in a set of 1490 by Adam Kraft, leading to the Johanniskirche in Nuremberg. A number of rural examples were established as attractions in their own right, usually on attractive wooded hills. These include the Sacro Monte di Domodossola (1657) and Sacro Monte di Belmonte (1712), and form part of the Sacri Monti of Piedmont and Lombardy World Heritage Site, together with other examples on different devotional themes. The sculptures at these sites are very elaborate and often nearly life-size. Remnants of these sites are often referred to as calvary hills.

In 1686, in answer to their petition, Pope Innocent XI granted to the Franciscans the right to erect stations within their churches. In 1731, Pope Clement XII extended to all churches the right to have the stations, provided that a Franciscan father erected them, with the consent of the local ordinary. At the same time the number of stations was fixed at fourteen. In 1857, the bishops of England were allowed to erect the stations by themselves, without the intervention of a Franciscan priest, and in 1862 this right was extended to bishops throughout the church.

== Stations ==
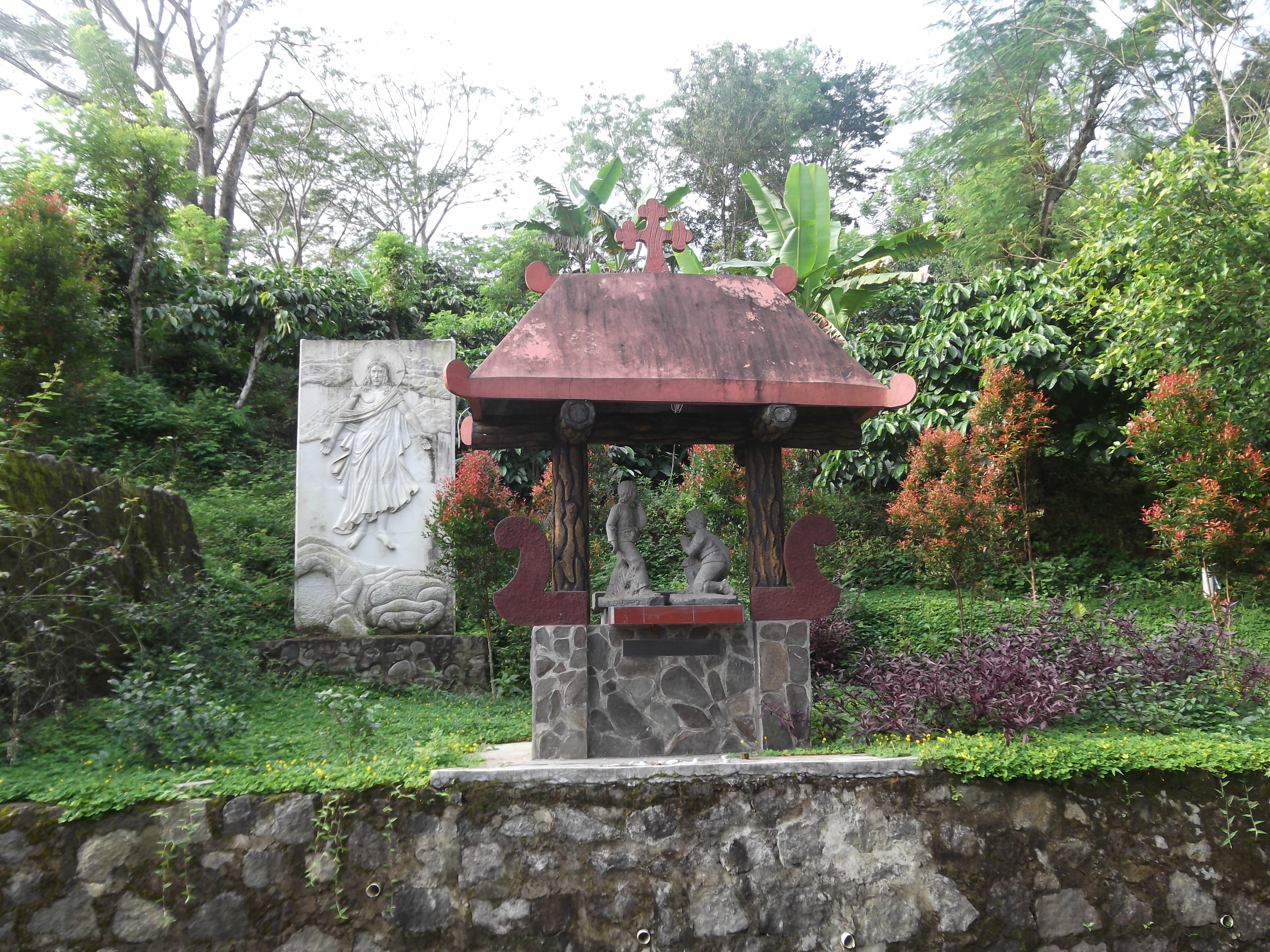
The Resurrection of Jesus at the Saint Mary Rawaseneng Prayer Garden, in the Rawaseneng Monastery, Indonesia

The early set of seven scenes was usually numbers 2, 3, 4, 6, 7, 11 and 14 from the list below. From the late 16th century to the present, the standard complement has consisted of 14 pictures or sculptures depicting the following scenes:

1. Jesus is condemned to death
2. Jesus takes up his Cross
3. Jesus falls the first time
4. Jesus meets his Mother
5. Simon of Cyrene helps Jesus carry the Cross
6. Veronica wipes the face of Jesus
7. Jesus falls for the second time
8. Jesus meets the women of Jerusalem
9. Jesus falls for the third time
10. Jesus is stripped of his garments (sometimes called the "Division of Robes")
11. Jesus is nailed to the Cross
12. Jesus dies on the Cross
13. Jesus is taken down from the Cross
14. Jesus is laid in the tomb

Although not traditionally part of the Stations, the Resurrection of Jesus is sometimes included as an unofficial fifteenth station. One very different version, called the Via Lucis ("Way of Light"), comprising the Fourteen Stations of Light or Stations of the Resurrection, starts with Jesus rising from the dead and ends with Pentecost.

=== Scriptural form ===
Out of the fourteen traditional Stations of the Cross, only eight have a clear scriptural foundation. Station 4 appears out of order from scripture; Jesus's mother is present at the crucifixion but is only mentioned after Jesus is nailed to the cross and before he dies (between stations 11 and 12). The scriptures contain no accounts whatsoever of any woman wiping Jesus's face (Station 6) nor of Jesus falling as stated in Stations 3, 7 and 9. Station 13 (Jesus's body being taken down off the cross and laid in the arms of his mother Mary) differs from the gospels' record, which states that Joseph of Arimathea took Jesus down from the cross and buried him.

To provide a version of this devotion more closely aligned with the biblical accounts, Pope John Paul II introduced a new form of devotion, called the Scriptural Way of the Cross, on Good Friday 1991. He celebrated that form many times but not exclusively at the Colosseum in Italy, using the following sequence (as published by the United States Catholic Conference of Bishops):

1. Jesus prays in the Garden of Gethsemane;
2. Jesus is betrayed by Judas and arrested;
3. Jesus is condemned by the Sanhedrin;
4. Jesus is denied by Peter three times;
5. Jesus is judged by Pilate;
6. Jesus is scourged and crowned with thorns;
7. Jesus takes up his cross;
8. Jesus is helped by Simon of Cyrene to carry his cross;
9. Jesus meets the women of Jerusalem;
10. Jesus is crucified;
11. Jesus promises his kingdom to the repentant thief;
12. Jesus entrusts Mary and John to each other;
13. Jesus dies on the cross; and
14. Jesus is laid in the tomb.

In 2007, Pope Benedict XVI approved this set of stations for meditation and public celebration.

=== The New Way of the Cross (Philippines) ===
Another set of stations is used by the Catholic Church in the Philippines. Filipinos use this set during Visita Iglesia, which is usually undertaken during Holy Week:

1. The Last Supper
2. The Agony in Gethsemane
3. Jesus is condemned to death
4. Jesus is scourged and crowned with thorns
5. Jesus receives his Cross
6. Jesus falls under the weight of the Cross
7. Simon of Cyrene Helps Jesus carry the Cross
8. Jesus meets the women of Jerusalem
9. Jesus is nailed to the Cross
10. Jesus promises Heaven to the repentant thief
11. Mary and John at the foot of the Cross
12. Jesus dies on the Cross
13. Jesus is laid in the tomb
14. Jesus rises from the dead

== Contemporary usage ==
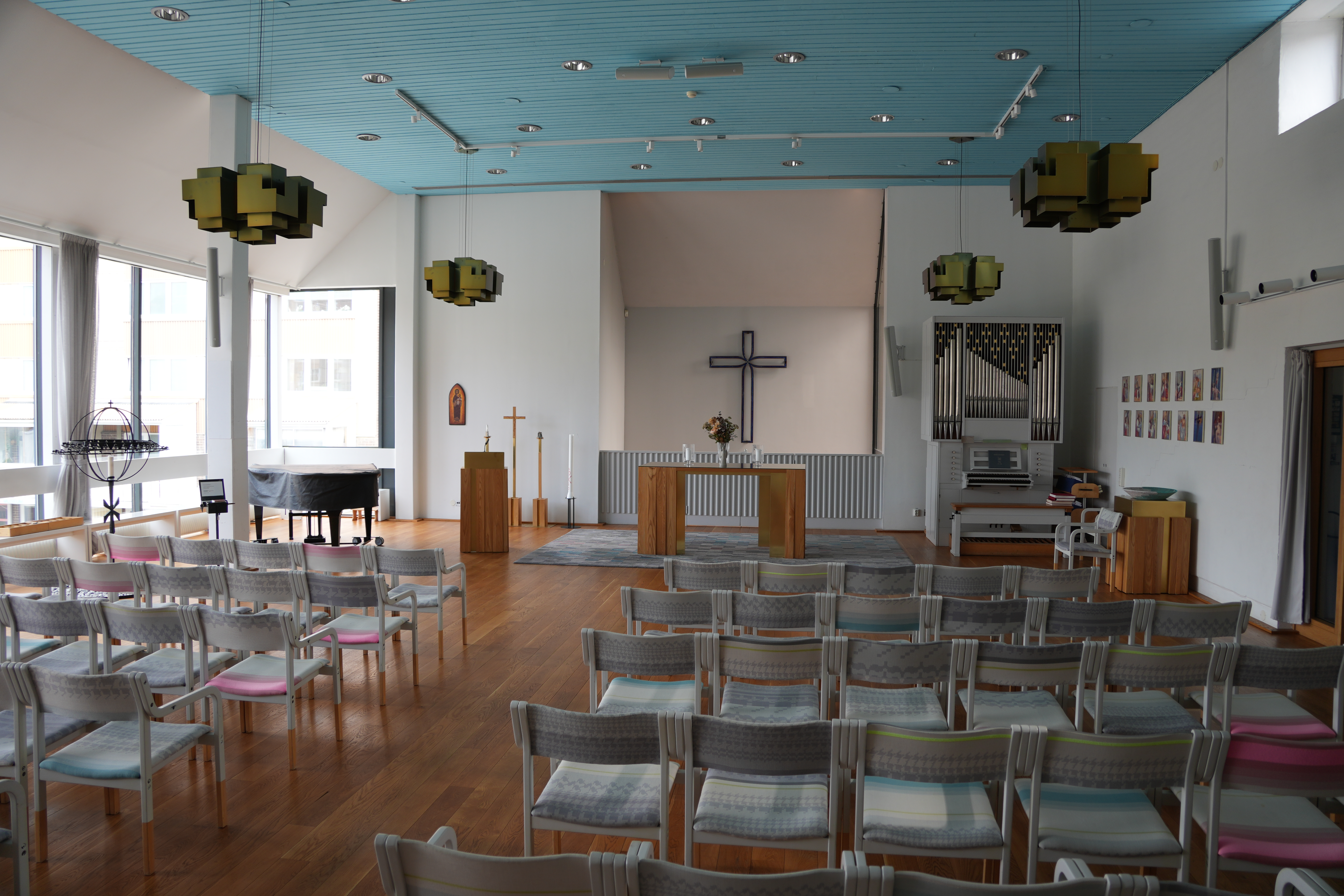
The Stations of the Cross in Fisksätra Church (Evangelical-Lutheran), located in Nacka Municipality, Sweden

In the Roman Catholic Church and Evangelical-Lutheran Churches, the devotion may be conducted personally by the faithful, making their way from one station to another and saying the prayers, or by having an officiating prayer leader move with the faithful from cross to cross while the faithful make the responses. The stations themselves must consist of, at the very least, fourteen wooden crosses—pictures alone do not suffice—and they must be blessed by someone with the authority to erect stations.

Pope John Paul II led an annual public prayer of the Stations of the Cross at the Roman Colosseum on Good Friday. Originally, the pope himself carried the cross from station to station, but in his last years when age and infirmity limited his strength, John Paul presided over the celebration from a stage on the Palatine Hill, while others carried the cross. Just days prior to his death in 2005, Pope John Paul II observed the Stations of the Cross from his private chapel. Each year a different person is invited to write the meditation texts for the Stations. Past composers of the Papal Stations include several non-Catholics. The pope himself wrote the texts for the Great Jubilee in 2000 and used the traditional Stations.

The celebration of the Stations of the Cross is especially common on the Fridays of Lent, especially Good Friday. Community celebrations are usually accompanied by various songs and prayers. Particularly common as musical accompaniment is the Stabat Mater of which a few verses are sung between each station. At the end of each station the Adoramus Te is sometimes sung. The Alleluia is also sung, except during Lent.

== Debates ==
=== Place of Christ's resurrection ===
Some modern liturgists say the traditional Stations of the Cross are incomplete without a final scene depicting the empty tomb and the resurrection of Jesus because Jesus' rising from the dead was an integral part of his salvific work on Earth. Advocates of the traditional form of the Stations ending with the body of Jesus being placed in the tomb say the Stations are intended as a meditation on the atoning death of Jesus, and not as a complete picture of his life, death, and resurrection. Another point of contention, at least between some ranking liturgists and traditionalists, is (the use of) the "New Way of the Cross" being recited exclusively in the Philippines and by Filipinos abroad.

The Stations of the Resurrection (also known by the Latin name of Via Lucis, Way of Light) are used in some churches at Eastertide to meditate on the Resurrection and Ascension of Jesus Christ.

== Music ==
Franz Liszt wrote a Via Crucis for choir, soloists and piano or organ or harmonium in 1879. In 1931, French organist Marcel Dupré improvised and transcribed musical meditations based on fourteen poems by Paul Claudel, one for each station. Peter Maxwell Davies's Vesalii Icones (1969), for male dancer, solo cello and instrumental ensemble, brings together the Stations of the Cross and a series of drawings from the anatomical treatise De humani corporis fabrica (1543) by the Belgian physician Andreas van Wesel (Vesalius). In Davies's sequence, the final "station" represents the Resurrection, but of Antichrist, the composer's moral point being the need to distinguish what is false from what is real. David Bowie regarded his 1976 song "Station to Station" as "very much concerned with the stations of the cross". Polish composer Paweł Łukaszewski wrote Via Crucis in 2000 and it was premiered by the Podlaska Opera and Orchestra on March 8, 2002. Stefano Vagnini's 2002 modular oratorio, Via Crucis, is a composition for organ, computer, choir, string orchestra and brass quartet. Italian composer Fabio Mengozzi released his electronic album Via crucis in 2022. Chinese-American composer Jordan Tang wrote Stations of the Cross for piano solo (2023, premiered in 2023) or piano and string quartet (2025, to be premiered 2026).

As the Stations of the Cross are prayed during the season of Lent in Catholic churches, each station is traditionally followed by a verse of the Stabat Mater, composed in the 13th century by Franciscan Jacopone da Todi. James Matthew Wilson's poetic sequence, The Stations of the Cross, is written in the same meter as da Todi's poem.

== Literature ==
Dimitris Lyacos' third part of the Poena Damni trilogy, The First Death, is divided into fourteen sections in order to emphasise the "Via Dolorosa" of its marooned protagonist during his ascent on the mount of the island which constitutes the setting of the work.

== Gallery ==
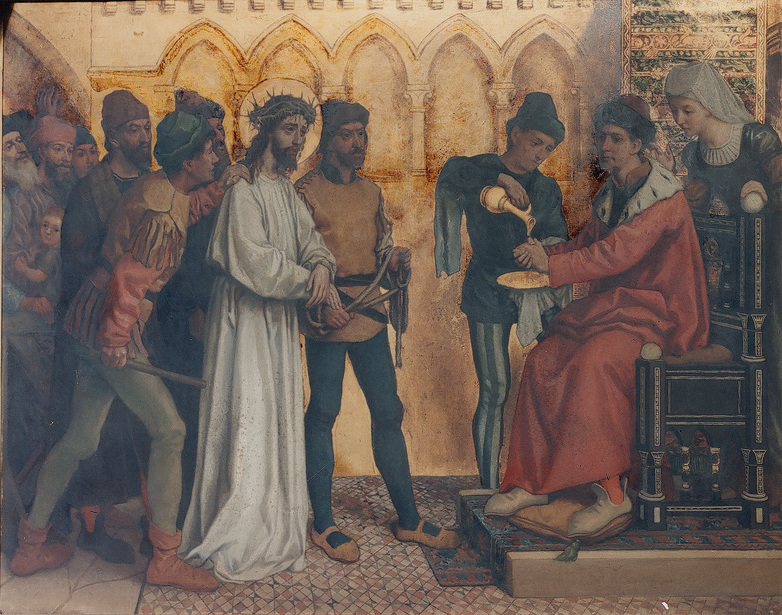
1st Station: Jesus is condemned to death.

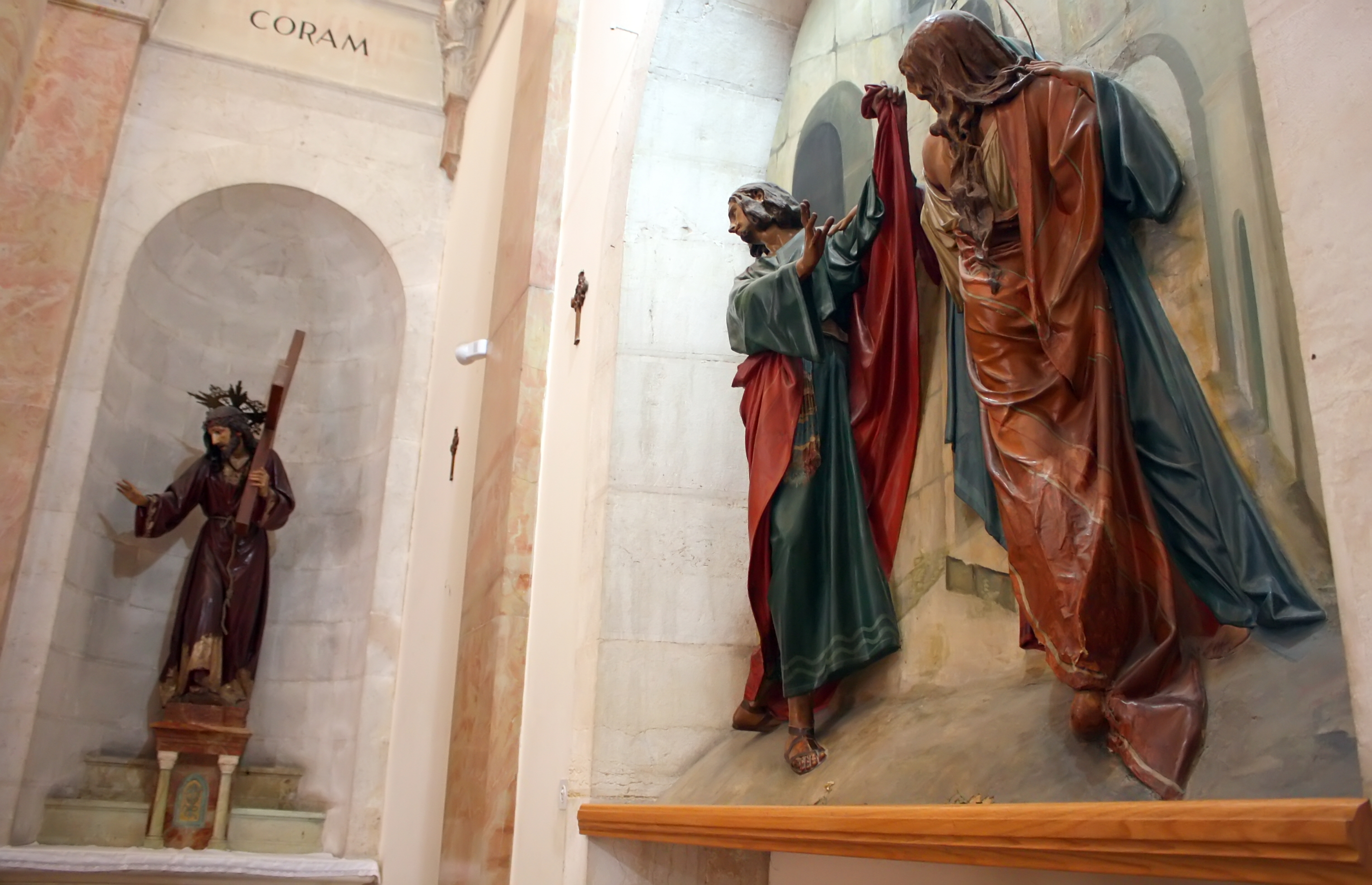
2nd Station: Jesus takes up his Cross.

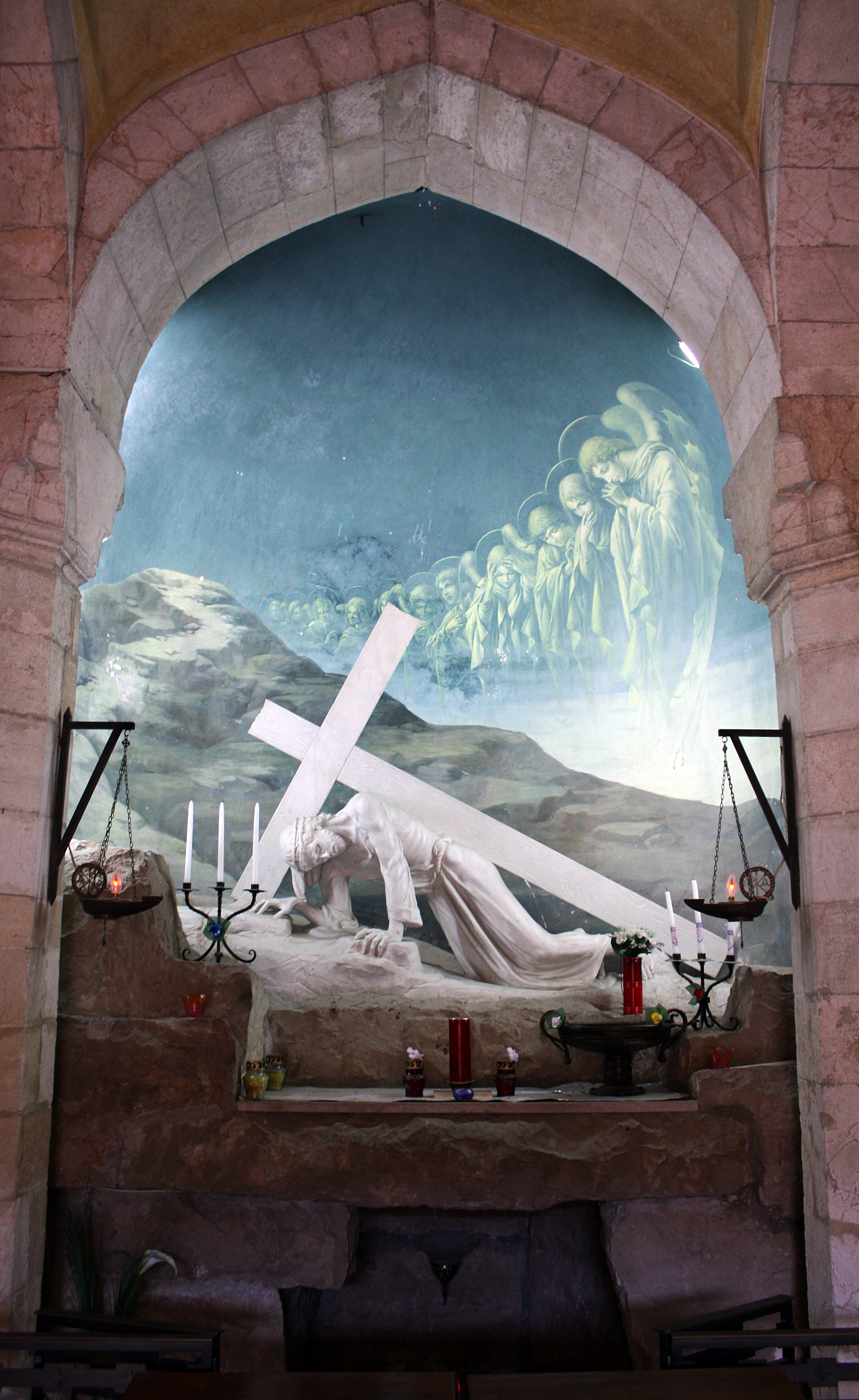
3rd Station: Jesus falls for the first time.

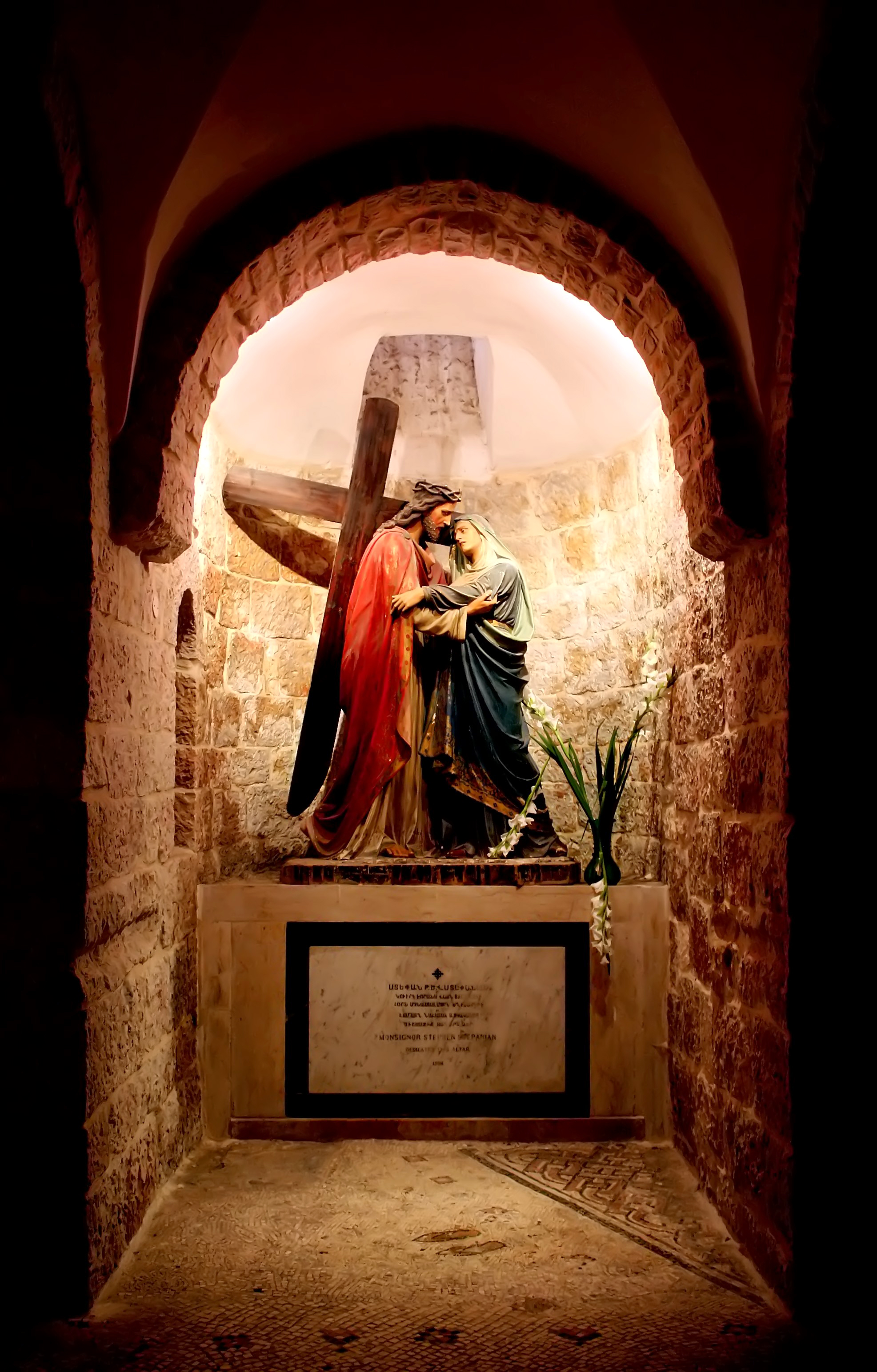
4th Station: Jesus meets his Mother.

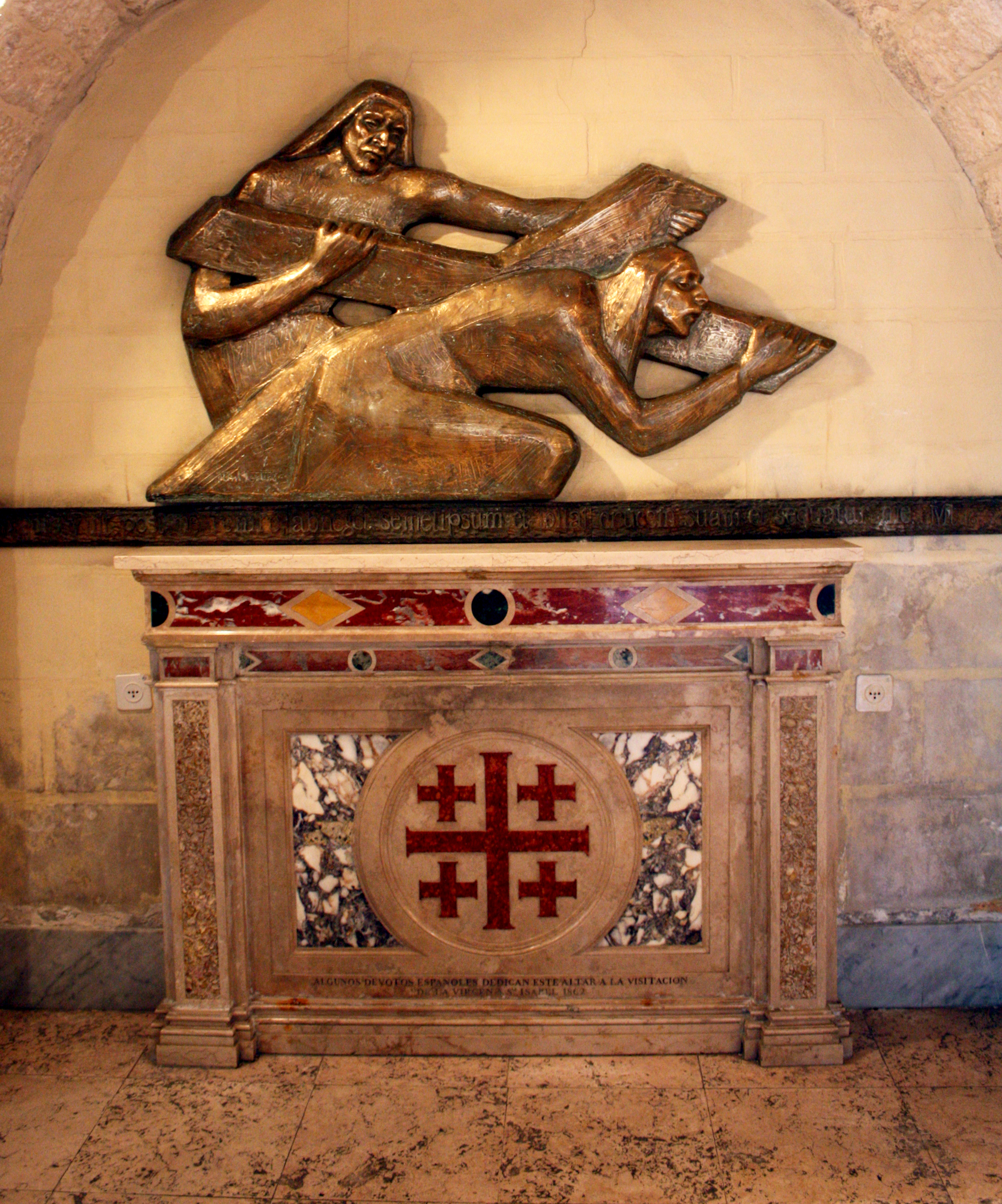
5th Station: Simon of Cyrene helps Jesus carry the Cross.

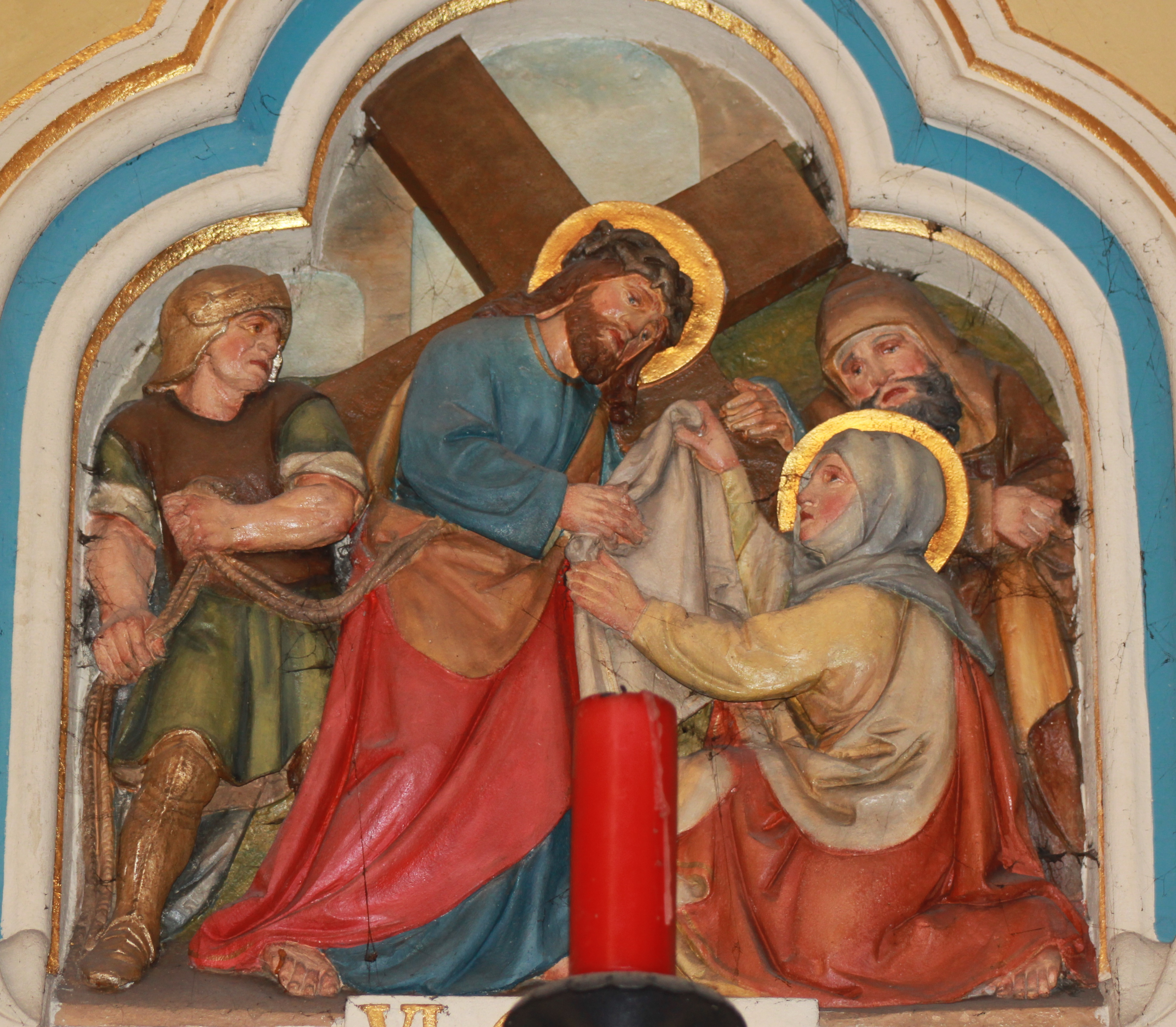
6th Station: Veronica wipes the face of Jesus.

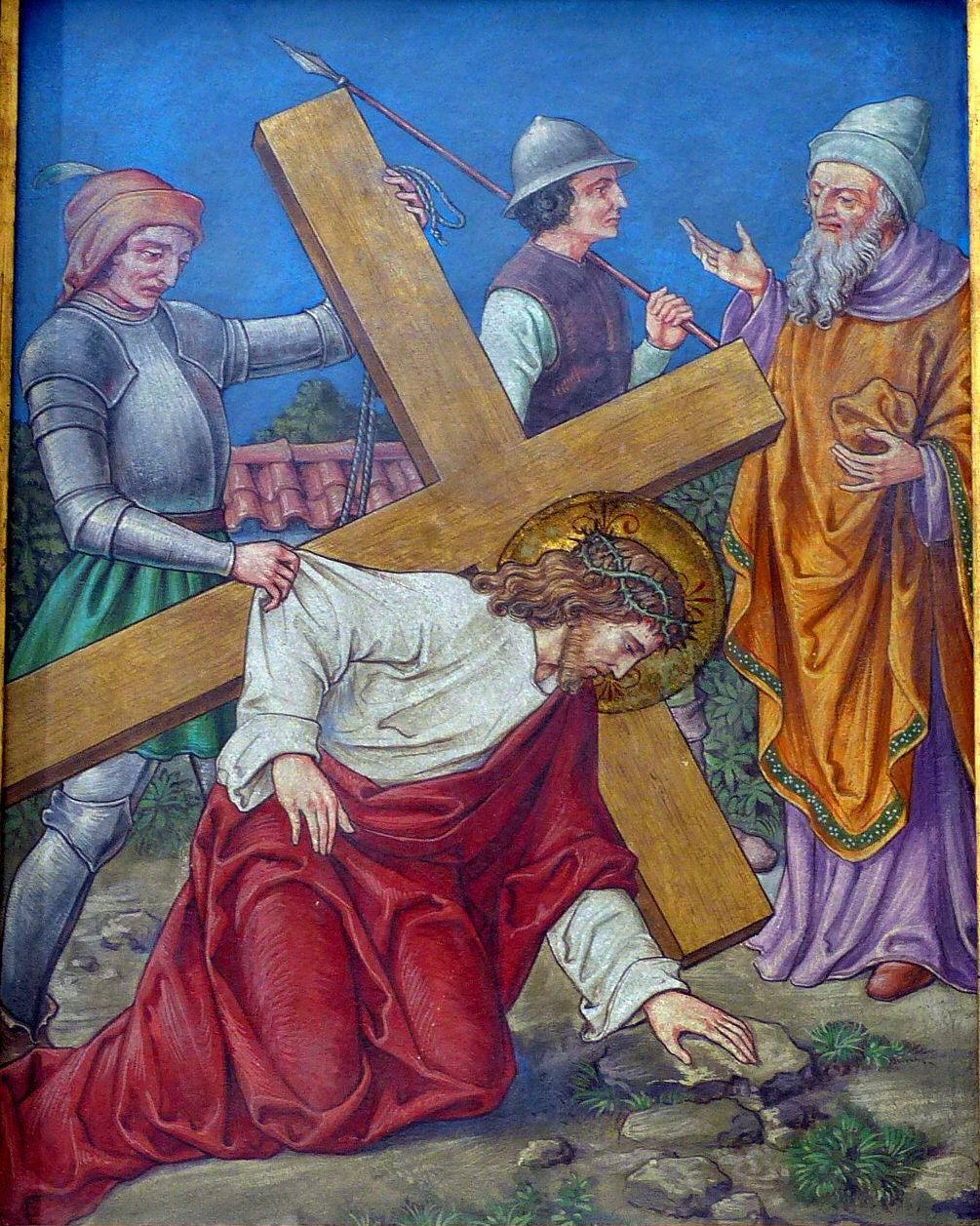
7th Station: Jesus falls for the second time.

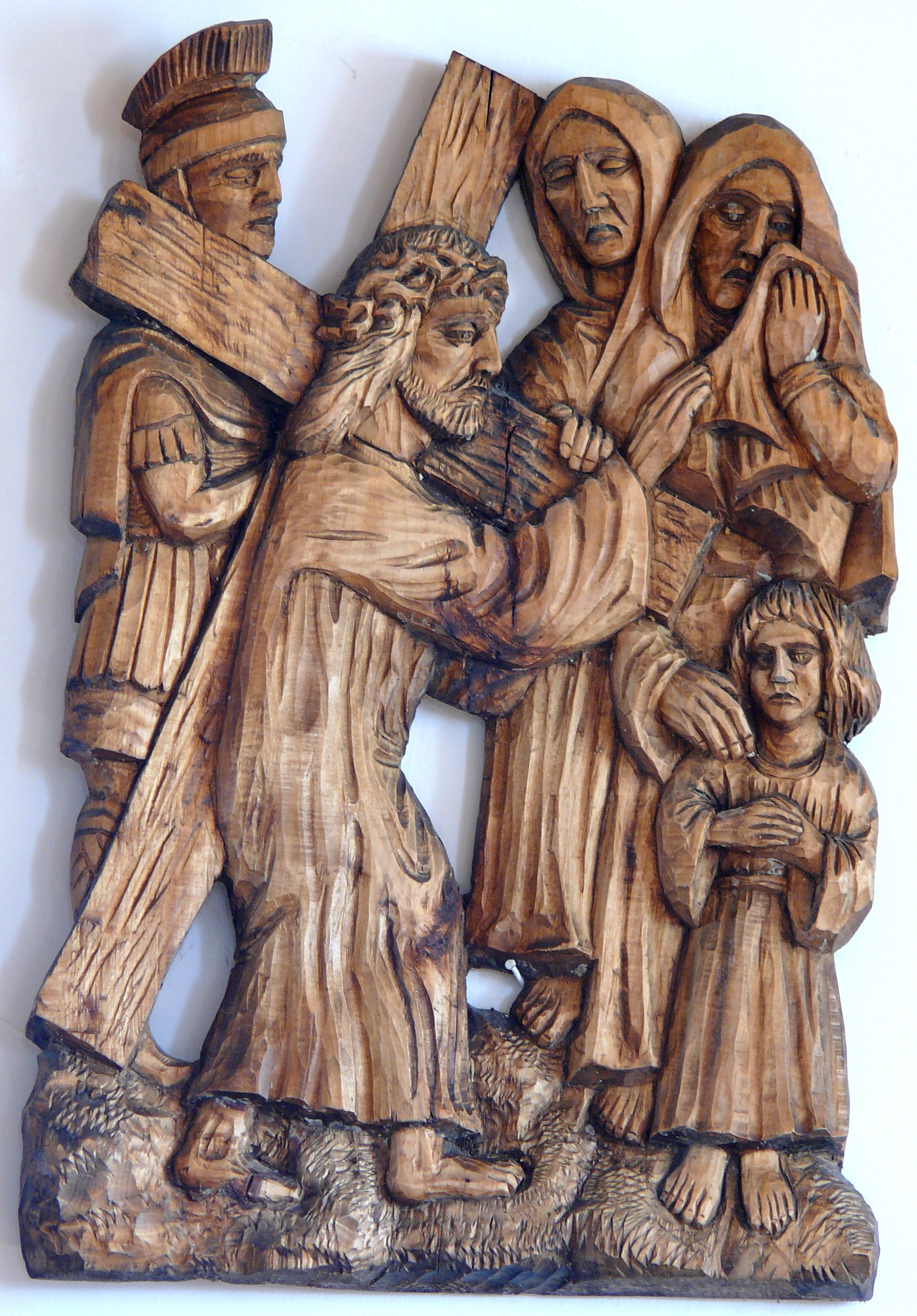
8th Station: Jesus meets the women of Jerusalem.

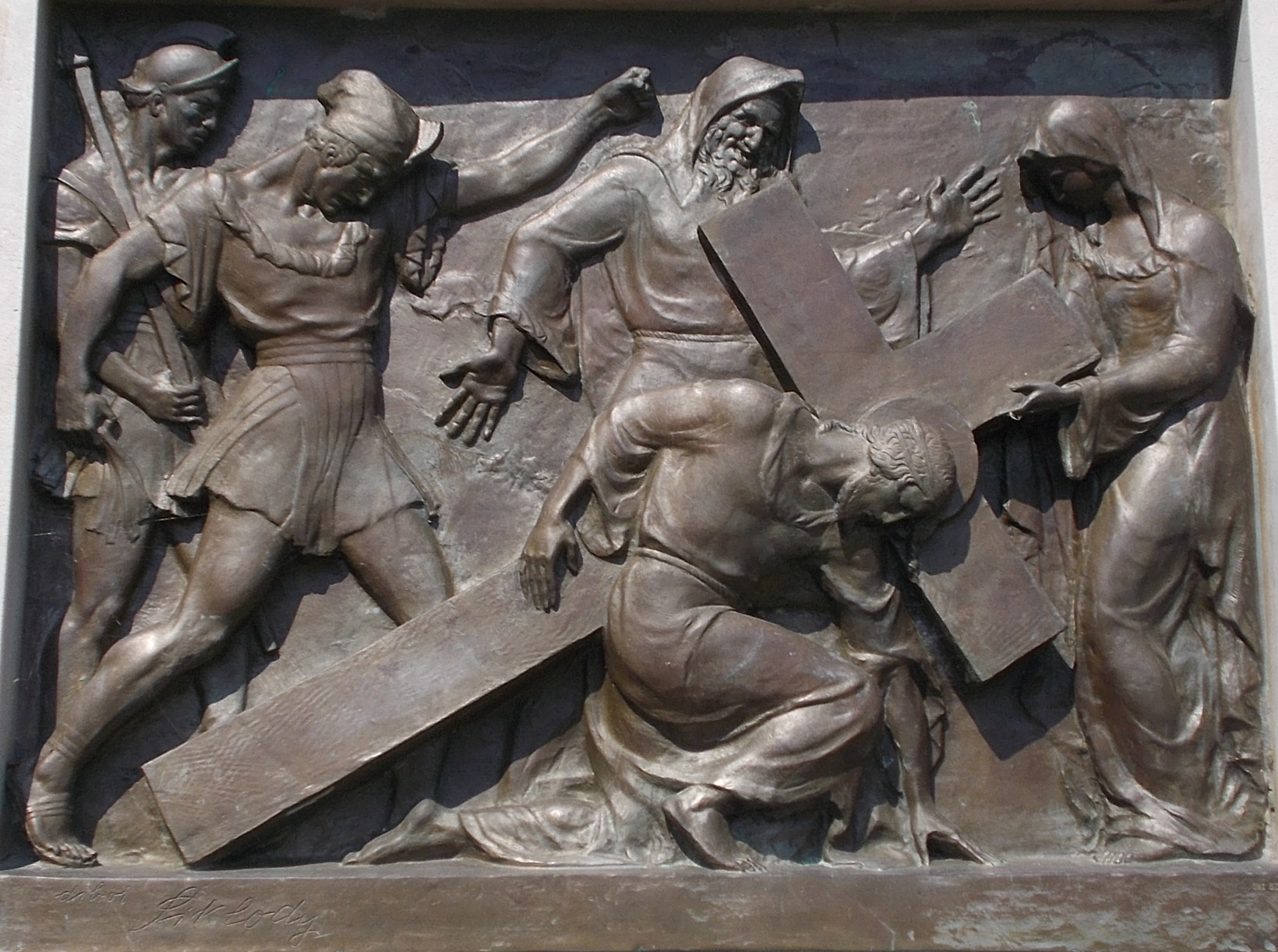
9th Station: Jesus falls for the third time.

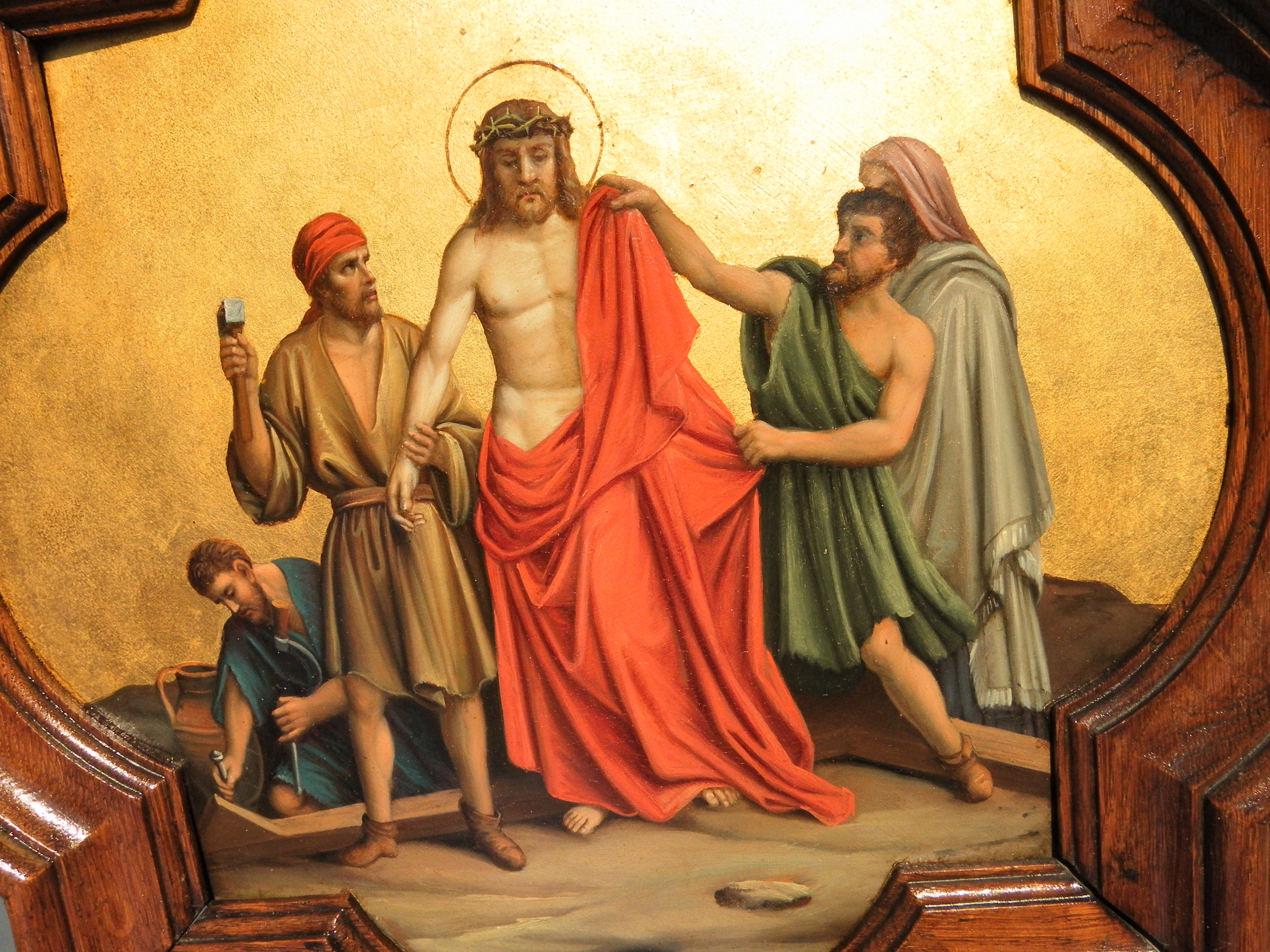
10th Station: Jesus is stripped of his garments (sometimes called the "Division of Robes").

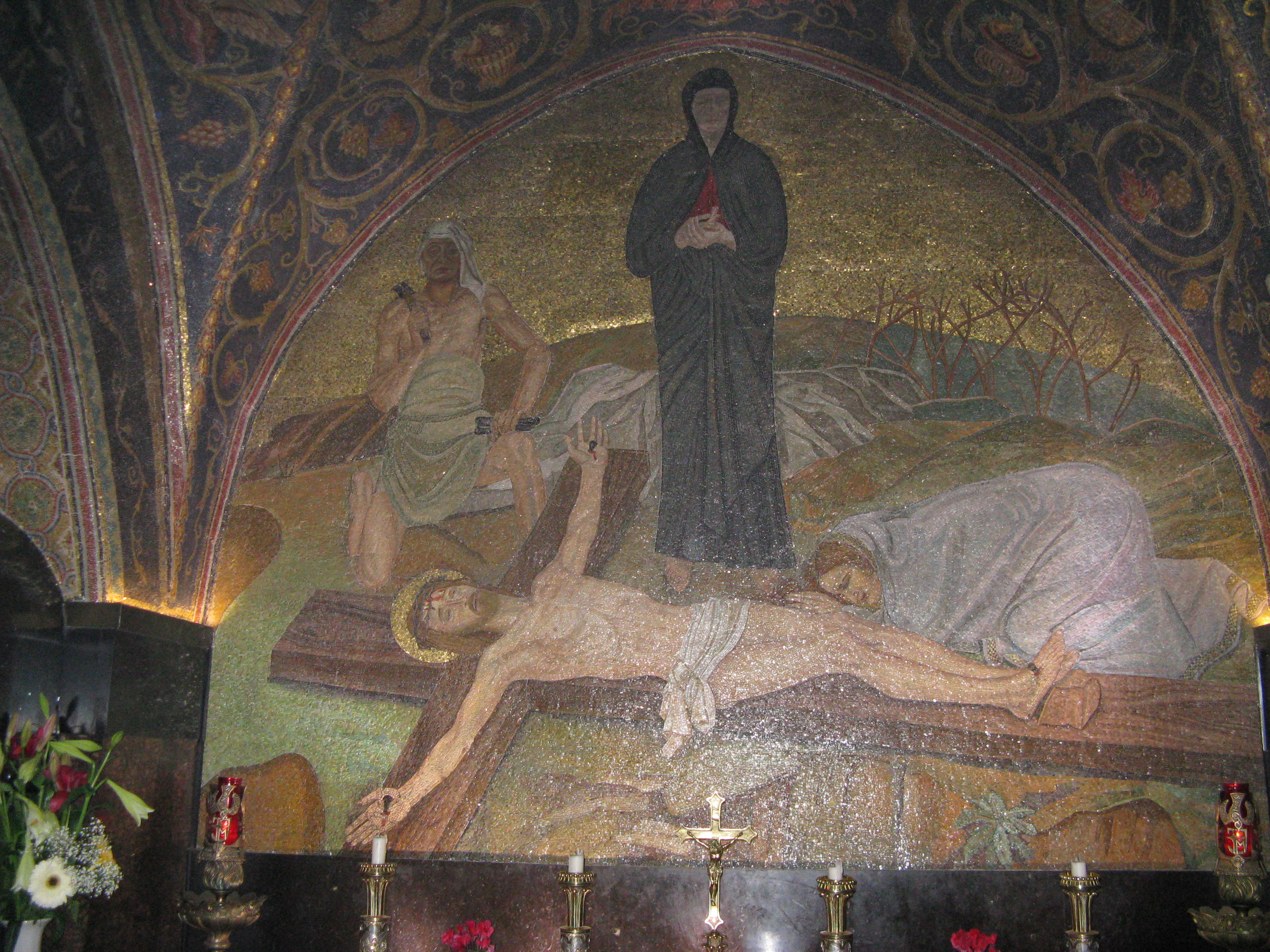
11th Station: Jesus is nailed to the Cross.

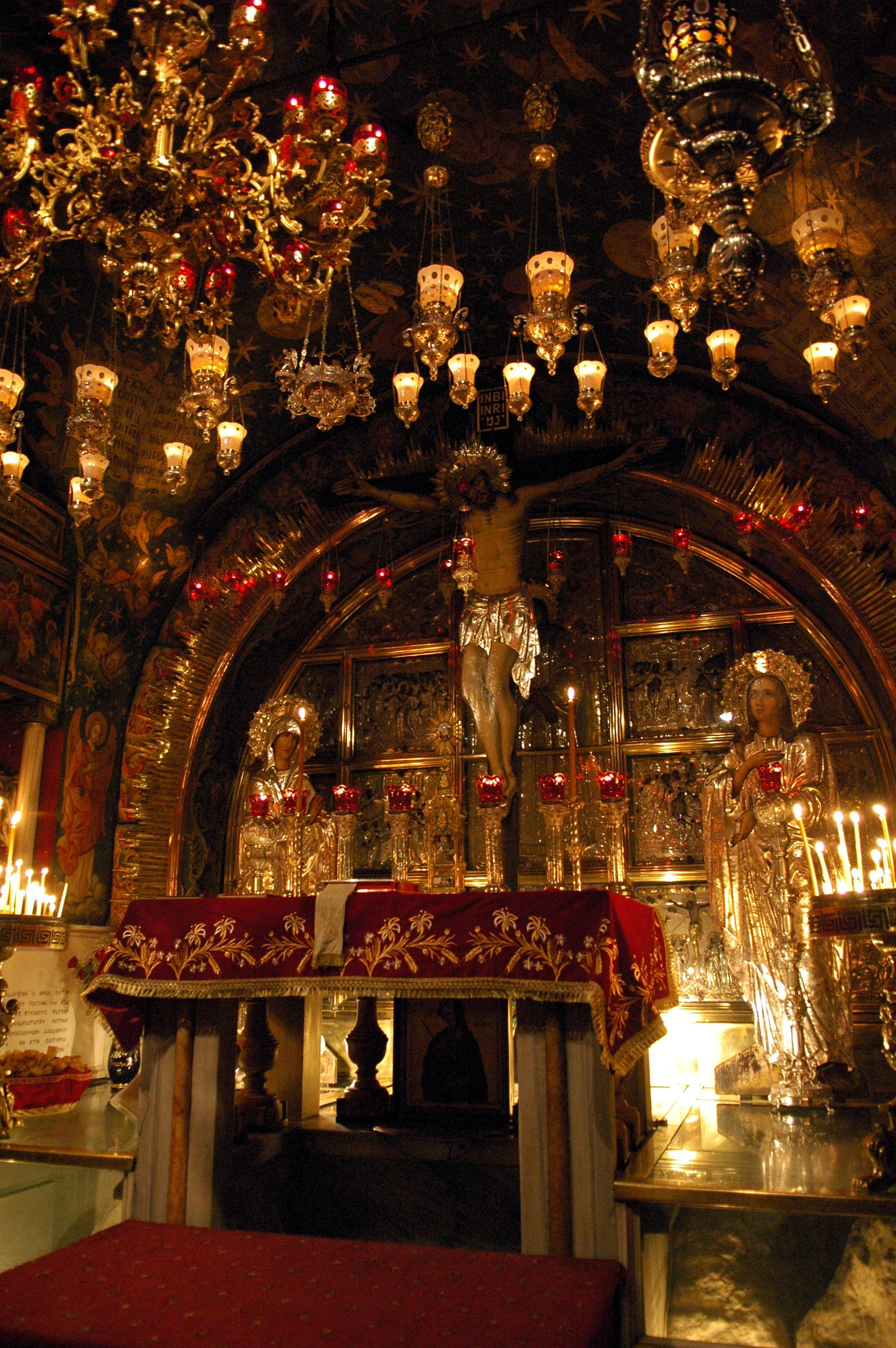
12th Station: Jesus dies on the cross.

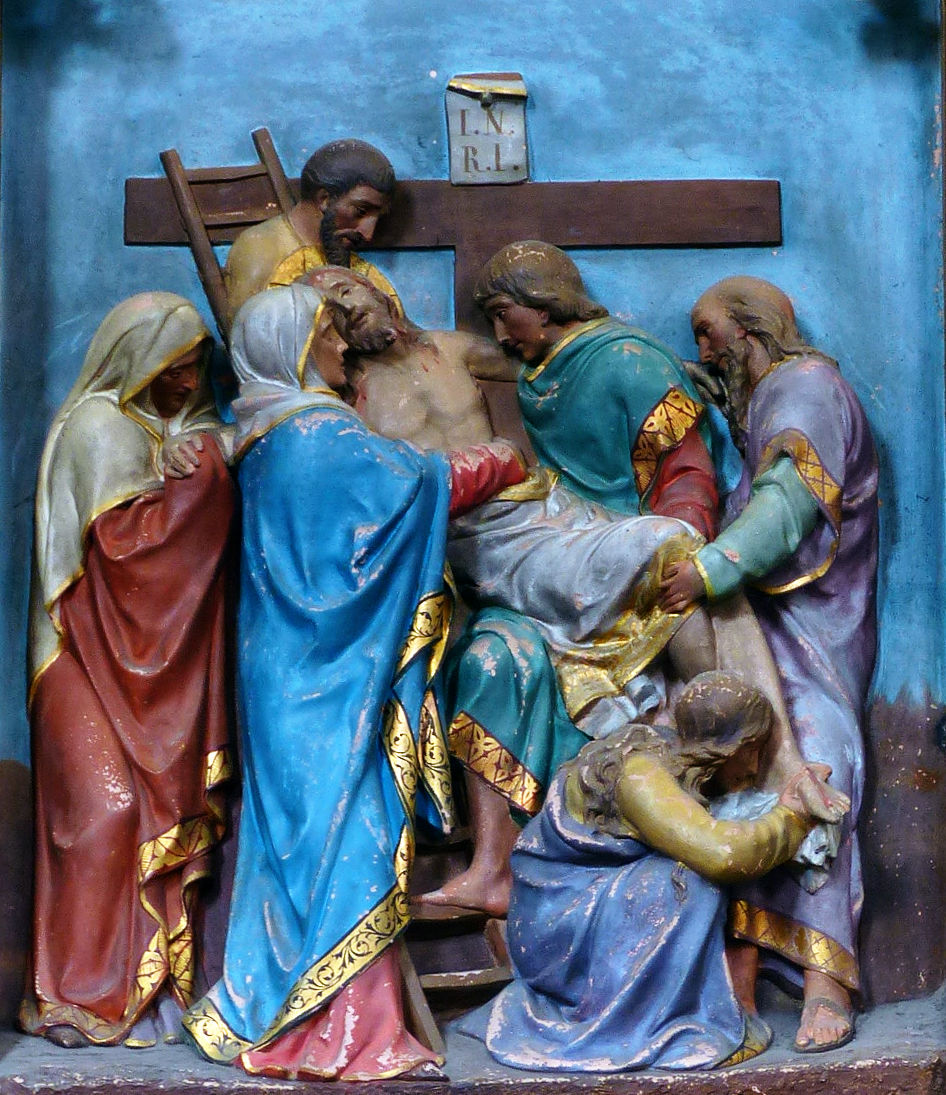
13th Station: Jesus is taken down from the Cross.

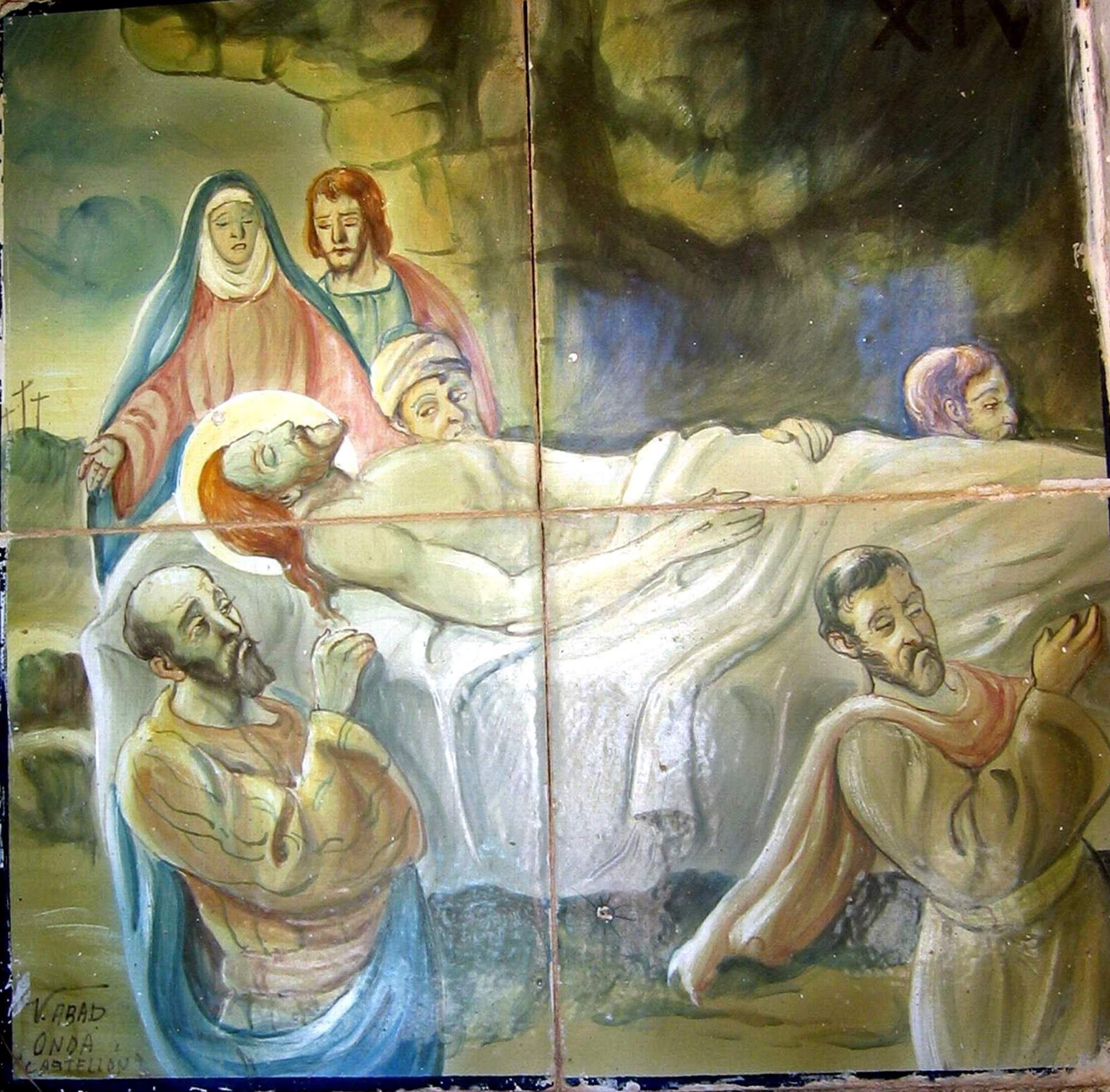
14th Station: Jesus is laid in the tomb.

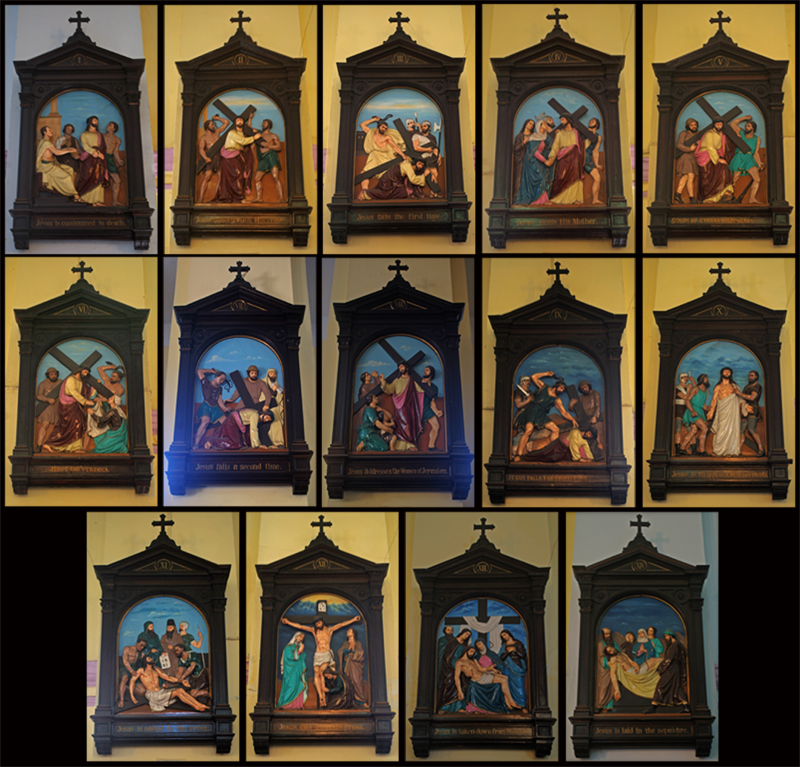
A set of the traditional 14 scenes from Holy Rosary Cathedral, Kolkata

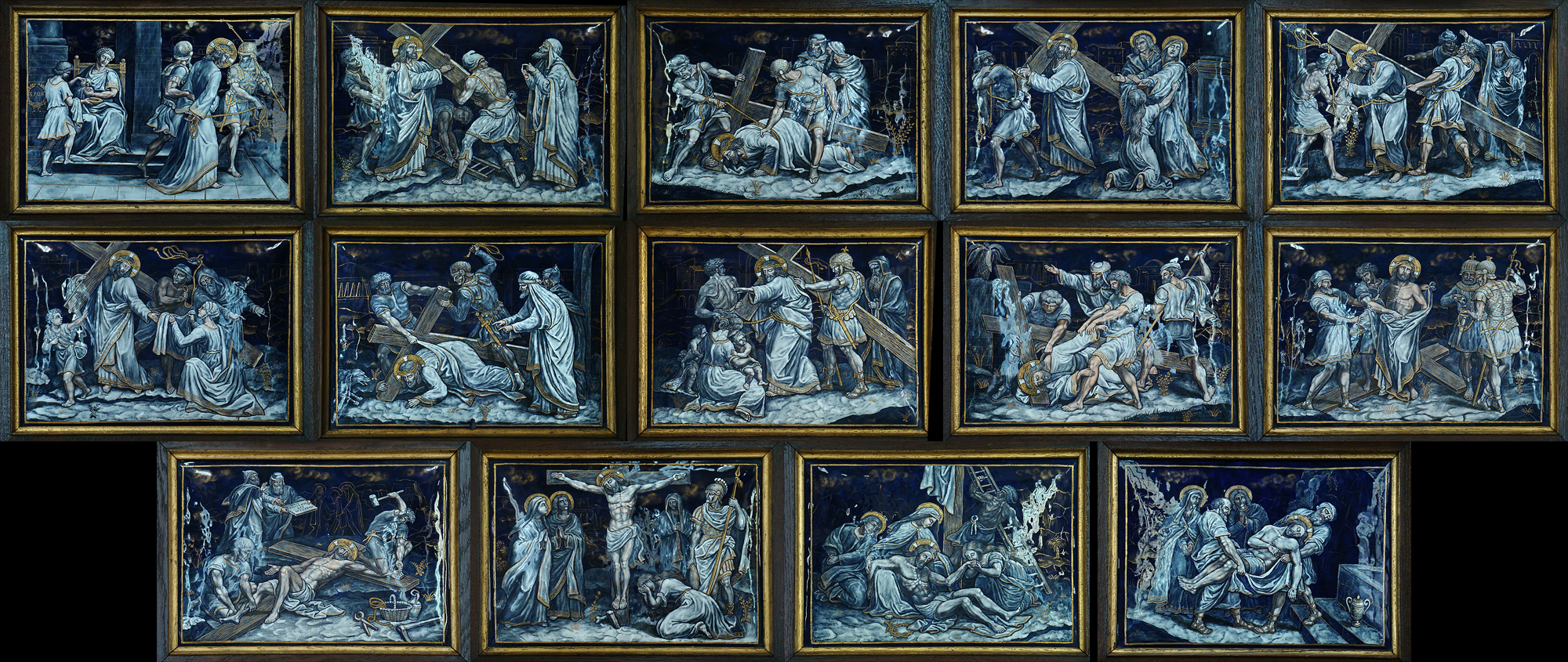
A set of the traditional 14 scenes in Limoges enamel

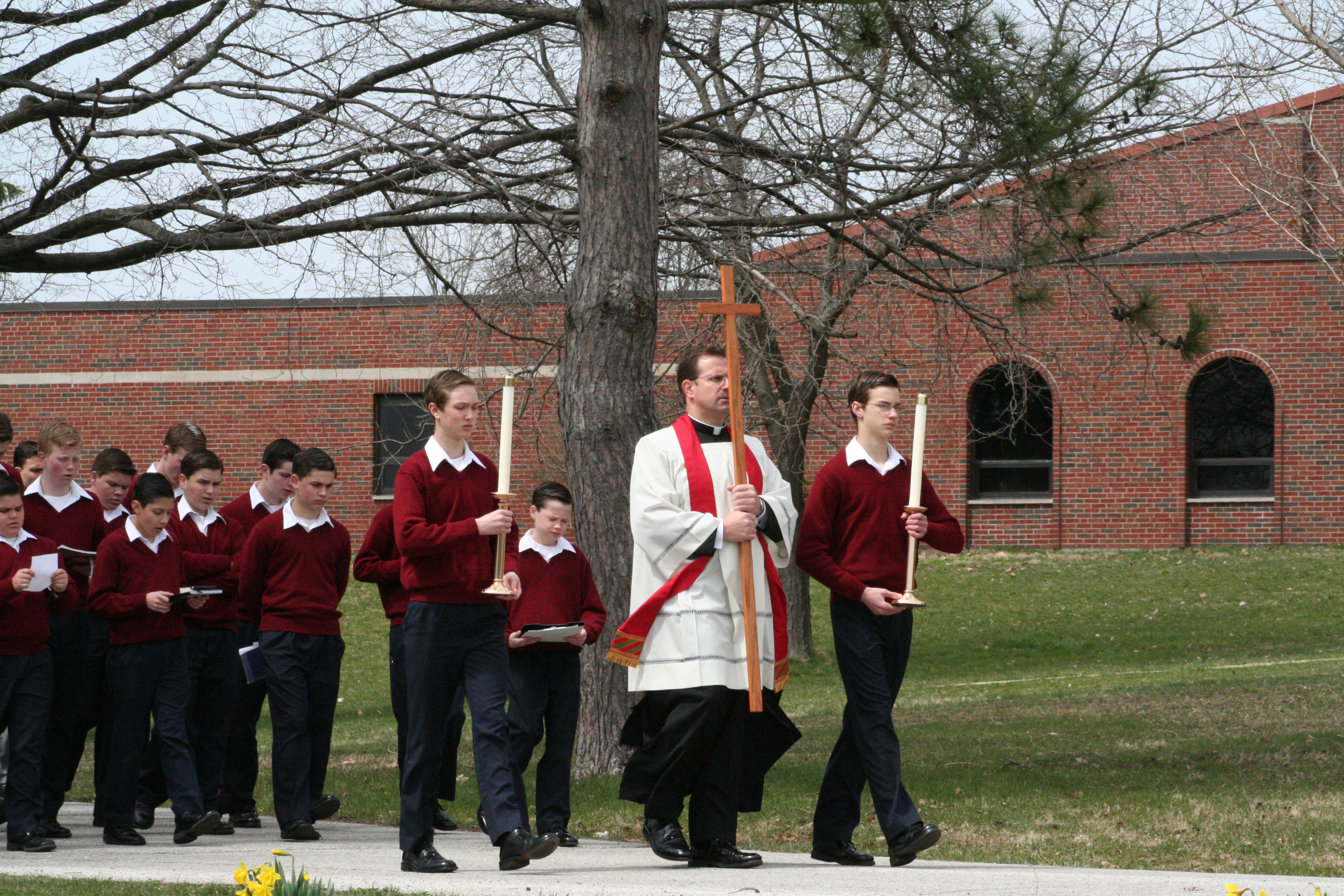
The students at Sacred Heart Apostolic School praying the Stations of the Cross on Good Friday, 2009

== See also ==
- Acts of Reparation to Jesus Christ
- Christian pilgrimage
- Life of Jesus in the New Testament
- Seven Sorrows of Mary
- Sorrowful Mysteries
- Sayings of Jesus on the cross
- Three Hours' Agony
- Via Lucis
- Mysteries of the Rosary
