= Musica con creta =

Studio album by Fabio Mengozzi
- Released: 2023
- Recorded: 2023
- Genre: Concrete music
- Length: 23:01

Fabio Mengozzi chronology
Via crucis (2022)	Musica con creta (2023)

Musica con creta is an album by Italian pianist and composer Fabio Mengozzi, released in 2023.

== Track listing ==
1. Lullaby – 1:24
2. Eden – 1:39
3. Antemoessa – 2:20
4. Estasi – 1:20
5. Thrênos – 1:28
6. Ultimi voli – 1:02
7. Catacumbae – 1:01
8. Clepsidra – 1:12
9. Galaxies – 2:04
10. My memories – 1:07
11. Furiae – 1:18
12. The magical garden of Faduah – 1:27
13. Hanami – 2:13
14. Windows – 1:17
15. Maràna Tha – 2:01
