= Jennifer Rothschild =

American author and speaker (born 1963)

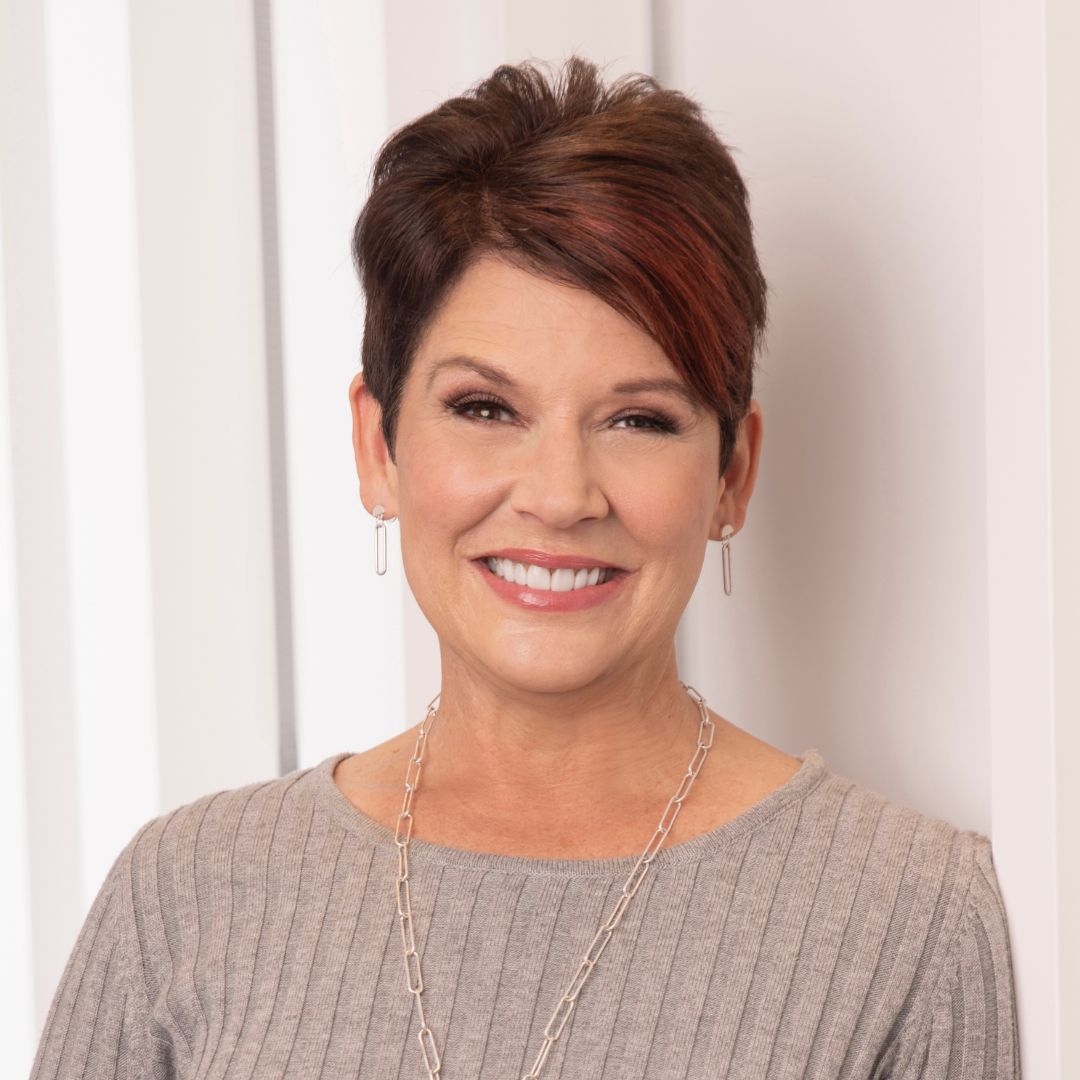
Jennifer Rothschild

Jennifer Rothschild (born 1963) is an American author, speaker, podcast host, and founder of Fresh Grounded Faith events for women. She has written 20 books and Bible studies. Rothschild founded womensministry.net in 1998, an online leadership resource platform to provide resources to women in the local church. Rothschild is blind.

== Early life and education ==
Jennifer Rothschild was born in Clearwater, Florida on December 19, 1963, to Lawson and Judith Jolly. She has two brothers, Lawson E. Jolly Jr. and Congressman David W. Jolly. Rothschild lost her sight at the age of 15 due to a rare form of the degenerative eye disease known as Retinitis Pigmentosa. She graduated from Florida Christian High School in Miami, Florida in 1982. She graduated from Palm Beach Atlantic University in 1986 with a BA in Psychology and a minor in Communication. After graduating she married Dr. Philip Rothschild of Palm Bay, Florida on August 9, 1986.

== Ministry and career ==
Jennifer Rothschild is a nationally known author, speaker and Bible study teacher who has written 20 books and Bible studies, including the bestsellers Lessons I Learned in the Dark and Me, Myself, and Lies. She's also host of the 4:13 Podcast with Jennifer Rothschild., a weekly podcast starting in 2018 with co-host KC Wright featuring Biblical wisdom and practical encouragement to help people live the "I Can" life of Philippians 4:13.

Jennifer has been featured on Good Morning America, The Dr. Phil Show, and The Today Show. She is the founder of Fresh Grounded Faith women's events, visiting over 70 cities between 2007 and 2015. Fresh Grounded Faith is a national Christian women's conference featuring Rothschild as host and main Bible teacher, with a musical artist and a guest speaker. Rothschild also founded womensministry.net, which was a member-based website that provided resources for women in leadership. womensministry.net changed from membership-based to a free resource library in 2017. She is also the founder of Fresh Grounded Faith, a national Christian women's conference. She has been featured on Good Morning America, The Today Show, Dr. Phil, The Learning Channel, and a Billy Graham television special and spoken for Women of Faith and Women of Joy conferences.

== Published works ==
Rothschild is the author of 20 books and Bible studies:

- Lessons I Learned in the Dark: Steps to Walking by Faith, Not by Sight (Multnomah, 2002)
- Walking by Faith: Lessons Learned in the Dark Bible Study (LifeWay Press, 2003)
- Fingerprints of God (Multnomah, 2003)
- Fingerprints of God Bible Study (LifeWay Press, 2005)
- Lessons I Learned in the Light (Multnomah, 2006)
- Self Talk, Soul Talk (Harvest House, 2007)
- Me, Myself, and Lies: A Thought Closet Makeover Bible Study (LifeWay Press, 2008)
- Fresh Grounded Faith Devotional (Harvest House, 2009) Re-released as This Morning With God
- Missing Pieces Bible Study (LifeWay Press, 2012)
- God is Just Not Fair: Finding Hope When Life Doesn't Make Sense (Zondervan, 2014)
- Hosea: Unfailing Love Changes Everything Bible Study (LifeWay Press, 2015)
- Invisible: How You Feel is Not Who You Are (Harvest House, 2015)
- Invisible For Young Women: How You Feel is Not Who You Are (Harvest House, 2016)
- 66 Ways God Loves You: Experience God's Love for You in Every Book of the Bible (Thomas Nelson, 2016)
- Me, Myself, and Lies: What to Say When You Talk to Yourself (Harvest House, 2017)
- Me, Myself, and Lies for Young Women: What to Say When You Talk to Yourself (Harvest House, 2017)
- Psalm 23: The Shepherd With Me Bible Study (LifeWay Press, 2018)
- Take Courage: A Study of Haggai Bible Study (LifeWay Press, 2020)
- Amos: An Invitation to the Good Life Bible Study (Lifeway Press, 2022)
- Heaven: When Faith Becomes Sight Bible Study (Lifeway Press, 2025)

== Personal life ==
Rothschild currently lives in Missouri with her husband, Phil. They have two sons, Clayton and Connor.
