= Fabio Mengozzi =

Italian composer (born 1980)

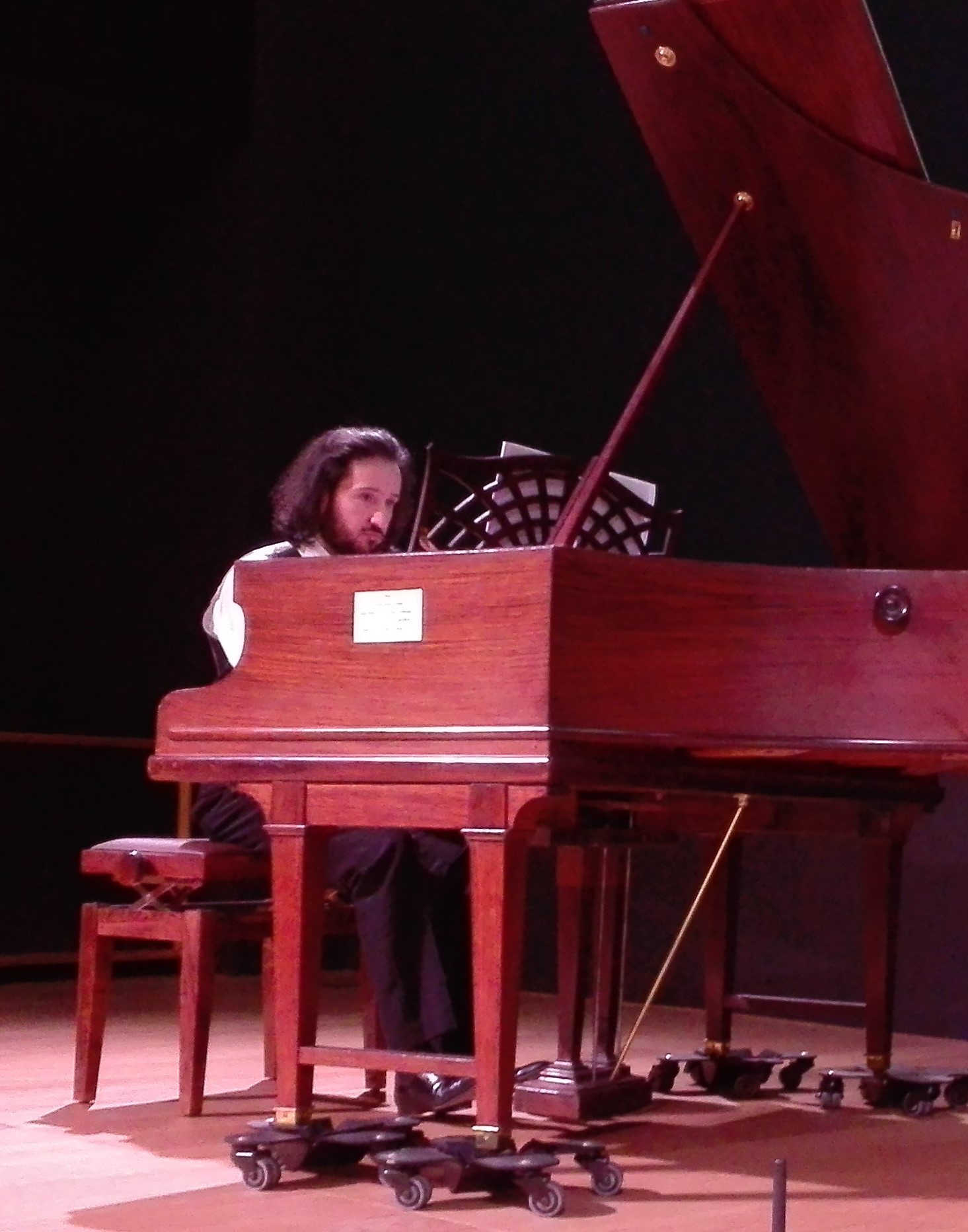

Background information
- Born: May 12, 1980; Asti, Italy
- Occupations: Composer, pianist
- Website: fabiomengozzi.wixsite.com/fabiomengozzi/

Fabio Mengozzi (born May 12, 1980) is an Italian composer and pianist.

== Biography ==
Fabio Mengozzi was born on May 12, 1980, in Asti. studied piano with Aldo Ciccolini, orchestral conducting and composition, masterclasses with Azio Corghi at the Accademia Nazionale di Santa Cecilia in Rome.

He won several awards including: 2nd prize at "11° Concorso Pianistico Nazionale Città di Genova" (1991); 1st prize at "3° Concorso Nazionale per Giovani Pianisti Comune di Terzo d'Acqui" (1991); 1st prize at "1° Concorso Nazionale Riviera dei fiori Città di Alassio" (1992); 1st prize at "XIII Concorso Pianistico Nazionale Città di Genova" (1992); 1st prize at "Concorso Musicale Europeo Città di Moncalieri" (1992); 1st prize at "2° Concorso Nazionale di Musica per borse di studio di Tortona" (1992); 1st prize at "7° Concorso Nazionale di Esecuzione Musicale Franz Schubert in Tagliolo Monferrato" (1992); 2nd prize at "3° Concorso Nazionale di Musica per giovani interpreti Città di Asti" (1992); 2nd prize at "1° Concorso Pianistico Italiano Premio Città di Cortemilia" (1993); 2nd prize at "4° Concorso Pianistico Nazionale Carlo Vidusso in Milano" (1994); 1st prize at "Concorso Pianistico Nazionale Lorenzo Perosi in Tortona" (1996); 1st prize at "Primo Concorso Pianistico Regionale Cortile Casa Lodigiani di Alessandria" (1996); finalist at "6° Concorso Nazionale di Composizione Rosolino Toscano" (Pescara, 2002); finalist at "Concorso di Composizione Franco Evangelisti" (Rome, 2003); 2nd prize at "Concorso Nazionale di Composizione Mozart Oggi 2005" (Milan, 2006); 2nd prize at "Concorso Internazionale di Composizione per Strumenti a Percussione" (Fermo, 2006); finalist at "Progetto Giovani Compositori Incontro con le musiche" (Forlì, 2007); finalist at "IV Rassegna dei Migliori Diplomati d'Italia" (Castrocaro Terme e Terra del Sole, 2000); 3rd prize at Michele Pittaluga International Composition Competition (Alessandria, 2010).

His music has been performed in Algeria, Argentina, Austria, Azerbaijan, Brazil, Belgium, Canada, Chile, China, Croatia, Denmark, Estonia, France, Germany, Greece, Haiti, the Netherlands, Iceland, India, Iran, Ireland, Israel, Italy, Japan, Montenegro, Poland, Portugal, Russia, Serbia, Slovenia, South Africa, Spain, Switzerland, Turkey, Ukraine, United Kingdom, United States by interpreters including Marco Angius, Francesco Attesti, Assia Cunego, Alpaslan Ertüngealp, Nicolas Horvath, Flavio Emilio Scogna, Antidogma Musica, Orchestra i Pomeriggi Musicali, at festivals and theatres among which Winchester Modern Gallery (Victoria, Canada), Royal Danish Academy of Music (Copenhagen, Denmark), Saint Petersburg Conservatory (Russia), Palm Beach Atlantic University (U.S.), Casa Italiana Zerilli-Marimò (U.S.), Erateio Odeio Conservatory (Athen, Greece), Kadriorg Palace (Tallinn, Estonia), Trivandrum Centre for Performing Arts (India), Karol Lipiński Academy of Music (Wrocław, Poland), Karol Szymanowski Academy of Music (Katowice, Poland), Ilija M. Kolarac Endowment (Belgrade, Serbia), Florentinersaal (Graz, Austria), National Gallery of Iceland (Reykjavík, Iceland), Gloucester Cathedral (England), Bristol Cathedral (England), St Michael at the North Gate (Oxford, England), Palais de Tokyo (Paris), St. James's Parish Church (Ljubljana), Ein Karem (Jerusalem), Protestant Temple in Collioure, Istituto Italiano di Cultura (Ljubljana), Strand Theater (Zelienople, Pennsylvania), Parnassos Literary Society, Sala Accademica del Conservatorio Santa Cecilia (Rome), Spazio Espositivo Tritone (Rome), MITO SettembreMusica, Stagione Sinfonica dell'Orchestra i Pomeriggi Musicali, Nuova Consonanza, Rassegna di Musica Antica e Contemporanea Antidogma, Aegean Arts International Festival (Crete, Greece), University of Minnesota Duluth New Music Festival (U.S.), La Nuit du Piano Minimaliste (Collioure), Gli Amici di Musica/Realtà (Milan), Festival Verdi Off (Parma), Unione Culturale Franco Antonicelli (Turin), Teatro Piccolo Regio Giacomo Puccini (Turin), Turin Conservatory, Turin Cathedral, Palazzo Saluzzo di Paesana (Turin), Auditorium Vivaldi at Turin National University Library, Palazzina Liberty (Milan), Teatro Dal Verme (Milan), Liceo Musicale Angelo Masini (Forlì), Teatro Vittorio Alfieri (Asti), Casa della Musica (Parma), Auditorium Parco della Musica (Rome), Sala Ciampi (Rome), Villa del Vascello (Rome), Conservatory of Vicenza, Giardino Bellini (Catania), Casa della Musica at Conservatory of Cosenza, National Central Library of Florence.

His compositions have been published by Bèrben Edizioni Musicali, Edizioni Sconfinarte and Taukay Edizioni Musicali.

== Selected discography ==
- Italy, CD harpAcademy (2014)
- Mistero e poesia (disco monografico), CD Stradivarius (2018)
- A Mario Castelnuovo-Tedesco, Music by Castelnuovo-Tedesco – Scapecchi – Mengozzi, CD Editions Habanera (2019)
- Romanza alla Terra (single), pianist Anna Sutyagina (2021)
- Melodia lunare V (single), pianist Anna Sutyagina (2021)
- Orpheus (single), CD SMC Records (2022)
- Romanza alla Terra (electronic single) (2022)
- Via crucis (album) (2022)
- Musica con creta (album) (2023)
- Suppliche (album) (2022)
- Primavera, stormi frementi nel silenzio del tramonto (single), harpist Claire Augier De Lajallet (2026)
- Rivo di cenere (single), pianist Anand Seshadri (2026)

== Works ==
=== Chamber music ===
- Trio (2001) for flute, oboe and piano
- Sezioni di suono (2003) for percussion quartet
- Elegia (2004) for two violas and piano
- Interferenze (2004) for flute, clarinet, cello, piano and percussion
- Ricercare (2004) for violin, cello and piano
- I cerchi concentrici (2006) for piano and percussion
- Naos (2006) for viola e piano
- Neshama (2008) for piano
- Mirrors (2010) for guitar and string quartet
- Lied (2010) for clarinet choir
- Sonata per arpa e percussione (2010)
- Arabesque (2011) for harp
- Diario d'arpa (2011) for harp
- Dieci frammenti celesti (2012) for prepared piano
- Poema della trasmigrazione (2012) for harp
- Romanza al cielo (2012) for harp
- Rosa (2012) for harp
- Crux (2012) for harp
- Symbolon (2012) for two harps
- Segreta luce (2013) for piano
- Ascensio ad lucem (2013) for piano
- Spire (2013) for piano
- Le rêve de l'échelle (2013) for clarinet choir
- Novella (2013) for harp or celtic harp
- Mysterium (2013) for piano
- Moto fluttuante (2014) for harp
- Phoenix (2014) for violin and harp
- Circulata melodia (2014) for piano
- Oltrepassando il valico (2014) for piano
- Veli (2014) for piano
- Commiato (2014) for piano
- Poema della luce (2014) for piano
- Poema litico (2015) for piano four hands
- Sub vesperum (2015) for piano four hands
- Anelito al silenzio (2015) for piano
- Reverie IV (2015) for piano
- Larus (2015) for violin, viola, cello and piano
- Artifex (2015) for piano
- Faro notturno (2015) for piano
- Horizon (2015) for piano
- Kairos (2015) for piano
- Nauta (2015) for piano
- Ianus (2015) for piano
- Ananke (2016) for piano
- Era (2016) for piano
- Romanza alla Terra (2016) for piano
- Reame (2016) for piano
- Lettera (2016) for piano
- Meteora (2016) for two pianos
- Promenade (2016) for piano six hands
- Flos coeli (2016) for piano
- Ceruleo vagare (2017) for piano
- Cometa nella notte (2017) for piano
- Estro (2017) for piano
- Rivo di cenere (2017) for piano
- Scintilla (2017) for piano
- Sempiterna ruota (2017) for piano
- Sfinge (2017) for piano
- Viride (2017) for piano
- Sorgente I (2018) for flute and piano
- Ousia (2018) for harp and piano
- Ousia II (2018) for flute, cello, harp and piano
- Delta (2018) for string quartet
- Romanza alla Terra II (2018) for flute and piano
- Melodia lunare (2018) for English horn
- Melodia lunare II (2018) for oboe
- Fantasia (2018) for guitar and piano
- Fiat lux (2018) for organ
- Auriga (2018) for harp and piano
- Auriga II (2019) for pianoforte, harp and string orchestra
- Ora (2019) for flute and cello
- Romanza alla Terra III (2019) for violin and piano
- SATOR (2019) for soprano and string quartet
- Pavana (2020) for two alto flutes and bass flute
- Solo (2020) for trombone
- Tre incantazioni (2020) for flute
- Vision (2020) for English horn, bassoon and piano
- Raggio (2020) for clarinet
- Agli albori (2020) for soprano and viola
- Aria dell'aria (2020) for Native American flute
- Claro (2020) for two clarinets
- Oasi (2020) for flute
- Rest in peace (2020) for soprano, flute and piano
- Melodia lunare III (2020) for flute
- Melodia lunare IV (2020) for tenor saxophone
- Melodia lunare V (2020) for piano
- Eclipse (2020) for soprano saxophone
- Autunno, petali sopiti nel vento (2021) for harp
- Primavera, stormi frementi nel silenzio del tramonto (2021) for harp
- Estate, luce di stelle nella notte (2021) for harp
- Inverno, neve cadente nel gelo dell'alba (2021) for harp
- Monodia cosmica (2021) for violin
- Ailes (2021) for ocarina
- Antica ocarina (2021) for ocarina
- Axis mundi (2021) for contralto and viola
- SATOR II (2022) for soprano, viola and piano
- Oasi II (2023) for bass flute and alto saxophone
- Gemma (2023) for harp
- Notte leggiadra di pioggia (2023) for piano (left hand)
- Fiori di carta (2023) for piano (right hand)
- Ad Te (2024) for organ
- Musica jubilosa (2024) for flute and piano
- Musica sublimata (2024) for flute and piano
- Anemoni (2025) for string quartet
- Intuition de l'arc-en-ciel (2025) for flute, violin and piano
- Quartetto I (2025) for string quartet
- Raggio II (2025) for clarinet and piano
- Harmonia umbratilis (2025) for two guitars
- Descensus splendoris (2025) for organ
- Flebile melodia (2026) for piano
- Melodia nel vuoto (2026) for violin
- Orme sospese nella notte (2026) for violin, clarinet and piano
- Quattro pezzi per clarinetto e pianoforte (2026) for clarinet and piano
- Tra i rovi (2026) for violin and piano
- Triadic rotation (2026) for flute, clarinet, violin and piano
- Aria del legno (2026) for Native American flute

=== Orchestral ===
- Vortici, affetti e un'evocazione (2005) for orchestra
- Secretum (2016) for string orchestra
- Constructores (2017) for string orchestra
- Aurora (2018) for chamber orchestra

=== Choral ===
- Hortus conclusus (2004) for women's choir
- Da una terra antica (2008) for mixed choir
- Gan Naul (2013) for women's choir
- Ave maris stella (2023) for children's choir

=== Electronic ===
- The woman clothed with the sun (2022)
- Orpheus (2022)
- Delle vette e degli abissi (2022) for tenor saxophone and electronic
- Romanza alla Terra (2022)
- Via crucis (2022)
- Musica con creta (2023)
- Suppliche (2023)
- Venus (2023)
- Antiche memorie custodite tra le fronde (2023)
- Lullaby for a child born in times of war (2023)
- Sub rosa (2023)
- Lacrimosa (2023)
- Ove tutto si dissolve (2023)
- Salmo XXXIV (2023)
- Veglia (2023)
- Amore e Psiche (2023) for soprano saxophone and electronic
- Mantra (2024)
- Song of irradiance (2024)
- The veil of Katechon (2024)
