= Mistero e poesia =

Studio album by Fabio Mengozzi
- Released: 2018
- Recorded: 2017
- Genre: Contemporary classical music
- Length: 74:39
- Label: Stradivarius

Fabio Mengozzi chronology
Italy (2014)	Mistero e poesia (2018)	A Mario Castelnuovo-Tedesco (2019)

Mistero e poesia is a solo piano album by Italian pianist and composer Fabio Mengozzi, released in 2018 by Stradivarius.

== Track listing ==
1. Mysterium – 10:59
2. Rivo di cenere – 2:32
3. Scintilla – 2:35
4. Nauta – 3:11
5. Ianus – 3:08
6. Commiato – 8:40
7. Reverie IV – 3:49
8. Artifex – 2:36
9. Faro notturno – 2:38
10. Viride – 5:01
11. Era – 2:40
12. Sempiterna ruota – 1:56
13. Cometa nella notte – 3:47
14. Sfinge – 7:19
15. Estro – 3:26
16. Ceruleo vagare – 4:34
17. Ananke – 2:06
18. Anelito al silenzio – 2:15
