= Joeckel =

The surname or the name Joeckel, also written Jöckel, Jockel or Jokel, of German origin (German pronunciation: [ˈjœkl̩]), may refer to:

- Carleton B. Joeckel (1886–1960), scholar
- Gordon Jockel (1920–2015), Australian diplomat
- Heinrich Jöckel (1899–1946), German war criminal, SS-Hauptsturmführer
- Hermann Jöckel (1920–1991), German football player
- Luke Joeckel (born 1991), American football player
- Samuel Joeckel, American author and professor of English

== See also ==
- A German pet form for the given name Jakob, a cognate of Jacob and James in English
