= Palm Beach Atlantic University =

Christian university in West Palm Beach, Florida, U.S.

Palm Beach Atlantic University (PBA)
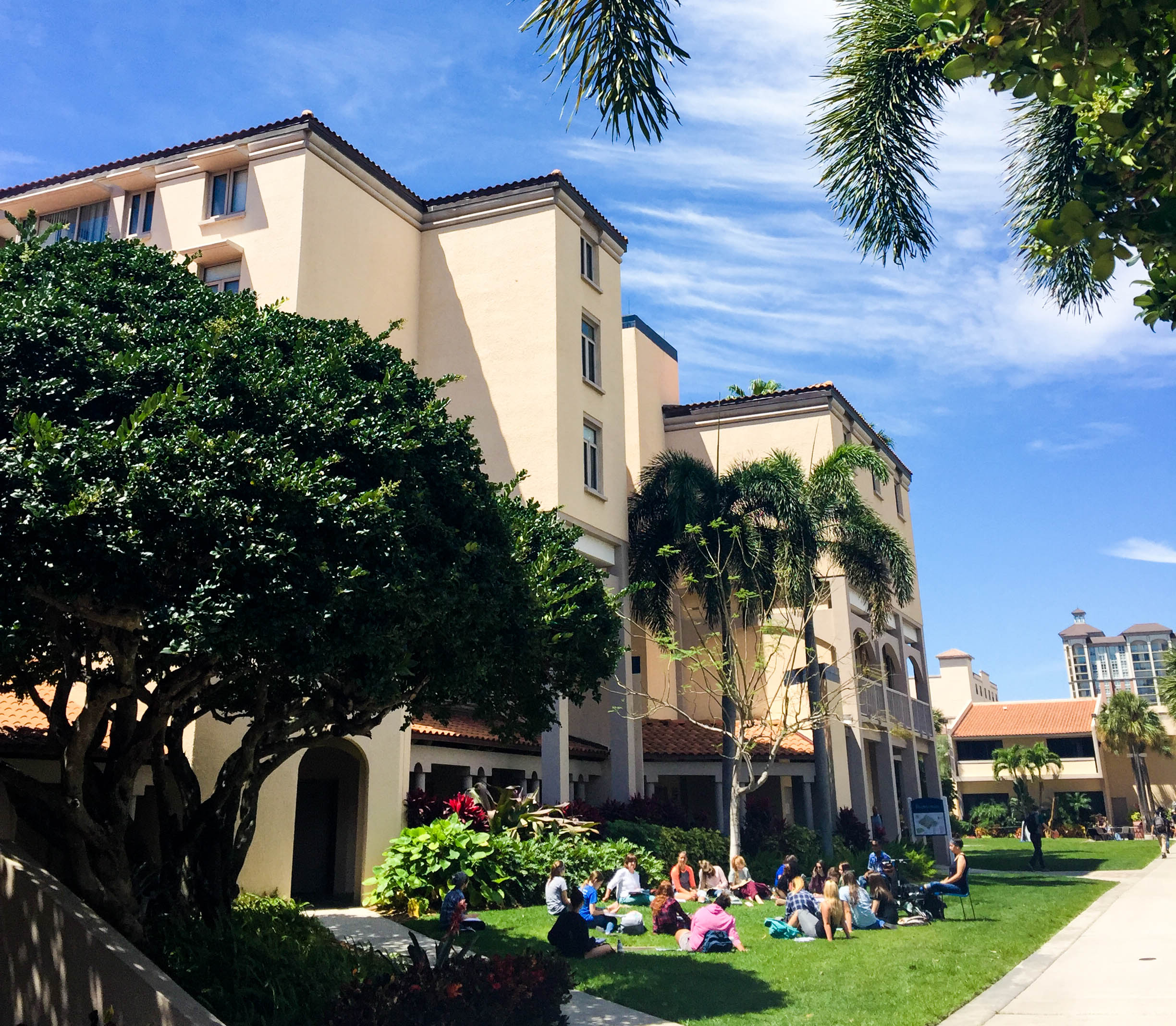
- The PBAU building in 2017
- Former name: Palm Beach Atlantic College (1968–2002)
- Motto: Enlightening Minds, Enriching Souls, Extending Hands
- Type: Private university
- Established: 1968; 58 years ago
- Accreditation: SACS
- Religious affiliation: Nondenominational Christian
- Endowment: $117.2 million (2025)
- Chairman: Thomas P. McCaffrey
- President: Debra A. Schwinn
- Provost: Stephen Johnson
- Faculty: 397
- Students: 4,147
- Undergraduates: 2,603
- Postgraduates: 709
- Location: West Palm Beach, Florida, U.S. 26.7036°N 80.0514°W
- Campus: Urban
- Colors: Navy Blue & White
- Nickname: Sailfish
- Sporting affiliations: NCAA Division II – Sunshine State
- Website: pba.edu

Palm Beach Atlantic University (PBA) is a private nondenominational Christian university in West Palm Beach, Florida. PBA's nine colleges focus on the liberal arts with a select collection of professional studies. In 2024, PBA's undergraduate enrollment was approximately 2,600.

Founded in 1968, PBA grew out of a local Baptist church. PBA is now a nondenominational institution. PBA operated out of assorted buildings until the first purpose-built PBA campus building was completed in 1982. A subsidiary PBA campus operates in Orlando. Eighteen sports teams represent PBA in NCAA Division II competitions.

== History ==
PBA was the vision of and was founded by Jess C. Moody in 1968 while he was the pastor of First Baptist Church of West Palm Beach. He served at PBA until the first PBA class graduated in 1972 and resigned as PBA president to focus on his duties at First Baptist Church. Two laymen of the church, Donald Warren and Riley Sims, became involved as trustees before PBA began and continued to contribute time and support at PBA for many years. Warren served as chairman of the trustees at PBA for 38 years until 2007.

In July 1972, Warner E. Fusselle, previously president of Truett-McConnell College, became PBA's second president and led the accreditation process at PBA with the Southern Association of Colleges and Schools, which PBA achieved in December 1972.

George Borders, Vice President of Student Affairs at Stetson University, became the third president of PBA in 1978. He was popular with PBA students and the Florida Baptist Convention. After his resignation from PBA in 1981 to become the president of the Florida Baptist Foundation, Claude H. Rhea became president of PBA. During his presidency at PBA, the university developed the Rinker campus—PBA's flagship location in West Palm Beach—and expanded academic programs at PBA.

Paul R. Corts, previously president of Wingate College, was the fifth president of PBA. He presided over the addition of two graduate programs at PBA, from 1991 until 2002. He resigned from PBA in 2002 to accept a position as Assistant Attorney General for Administration with the United States Department of Justice.

David W. Clark, President of FamilyNet, cable TV network, and founding provost of Regent University became the sixth PBA president in 2003. During his presidency enrollment at PBA grew from 2,600 to 3,291. Five new buildings were completed at PBA, including the Warren Library and a mini PBA campus in Wellington. Meanwhile, 96 acres (390,000 m^{2}) for a new PBA athletic campus were acquired. PBA's budget grew from $43 million to $73 million. Over 4,600 or 40 percent of all degrees at PBA were awarded during his tenure at PBA. President Clark announced his retirement from PBA during the 2008–2009 academic year at the end of June. He later served as interim president of Vanguard University.

On July 1, 2009, Lu Hardin took office as the seventh president of PBA. A former Arkansas state senator, Hardin had previously served as the president of the University of Central Arkansas. Hardin resigned the presidency of PBA on March 4, 2011, shortly before pleading guilty in federal court in Little Rock, Arkansas, to two federal felony charges (wire fraud and money laundering) which occurred during his tenure at UCA.

On March 10, 2011, William M. B. "Bill" Fleming Jr., PBA's vice president for development, was named interim PBA president by the university's board of trustees. After a nationwide search, Fleming, who had served as interim president at PBA for more than a year, was elected by the trustees as PBA's eighth president, beginning his presidency at PBA on May 8, 2012.

On January 16, 2020, Dr. Debra Schwinn was announced as the new president of PBA, following Fleming's retirement. Schwinn took office at PBA on May 4, 2020. She was PBA's first woman president. PBA was one of the few universities in the United States to fully operate in person during the COVID-19 pandemic in 2021. Under Dr. Schwinn's leadership one of the PBA dorms, Watson Hall, was used in part for quarantine dorms. A team of health alert nurses at PBA would text any COVID-positive students to stay home, then commence contact tracing. While only a few PBA students needed to be quarantined, PBA ensured their meals were delivered and that a buddy system was in place. PBA students also could spend 30 minutes each night on a special Zoom meeting with Dr. Schwinn and other quarantined PBA students.

== Campus ==
PBA's campus is located in West Palm Beach. The first structure built specifically for PBA, the W.G. Lassiter Jr. Student Center, was completed in 1982. This was followed by PBA's Johnson Hall and Sachs Hall in 1989. A new PBA campus was established in Orlando in 2002 and in Wellington in 2002. PBA's Wellington campus ceased operations in 2017.

PBA residence halls include Baxter Hall, Coastal Towers Apartments, Johnson Hall, Oceanview Hall, Pembroke Hall, Rinker Hall, Watson Hall, and Weyenberg Hall.

Classroom buildings at PBA include the Vera Lea Rinker Hall, the Lloyd L. Gregory School of Pharmacy, Borbe Hall, MacArthur Hall, Rinker Hall, Oceanview Hall, The Greene Complex for Sports and Recreation, Memorial Presbyterian Church, Fern Street Theatre, Holy Trinity Church, and Okeechobee Hall. In 2022, PBA launched its God-Sized Dreams campaign, a capital plan to expand academic programs and innovative spaces on PBA's West Palm Beach campus. In January 2024, PBA broke ground on the Marshall and Vera Lea Rinker Business Hall, the first of four major projects to occur under PBA's God-Sized Dreams campaign.

A permanent home for PBA Athletics is in the form of a 78-acre Marshall and Vera Lea Rinker Athletic Campus at 3401 Parker Avenue in West Palm Beach—just a short drive from PBA. The campus, located between I-95 and Parker Avenue just north of Southern Boulevard, provides PBA facilities for training and hosting intercollegiate and intramural and club sport competitions. The PBA facility opened in September 2014 and was completed in August 2017.

== Growth ==
Over the past several years, PBA has experienced unprecedented growth on its West Palm Beach campus. In 2024, PBA celebrated its third consecutive year of record-breaking enrollment. Now, PBA has over 4,100 students, with more than 80 countries represented. PBA contributed more than $435.6 million in economic impact to Palm Beach County in 2023-2024.

In June 2024, PBA was ranked third in the nation for application growth compared to pre-COVID levels, according to an analysis by Numerade using National Center for Education Statistics data.

This growth at PBA, coupled with the economic boom that South Florida has experienced in recent years, positions PBA to respond to market changes, expand academic programs at PBA, and build new, innovative spaces through PBA's God-Sized Dreams campaign. Under the expansion plan, PBA will undertake four key projects. In January 2024, PBA broke ground on the first: the Marshall and Vera Lea Rinker Business Hall, after a historic donation from a longtime PBA supporter inspired the launch of the campaign at PBA. The university will also build a world-class performing arts center, a welcome center, and a new health sciences complex at PBA.

== Academics ==
PBA offers more than 100 undergraduate and graduate programs through nine schools:

- Rinker School of Business
- School of Liberal Arts and Sciences
- School of Health Professions
- School of Education and Behavioral Studies
- Catherine T. MacArthur School of Leadership
- School of Ministry
- College of the Arts
- School of Nursing
- Gregory School of Pharmacy

The university also offers seven centers of excellence that complement PBA's academic programs:

- Center for Financial Literacy
- Center for Global Leadership
- Center for Integrative Science Learning
- Gregory Center for Medical Missions
- LeMieux Center for Public Policy
- Rinker Center for Experiential Learning
- Titus Center for Franchising

=== Academic freedom ===
In 2023, PBA English professor Samuel Joeckel was fired from PBA following allegations from a parent that he was "indoctrinating" PBA students by including racial justice texts in a composition class at PBA. Joeckel said that he had a racial justice unit at PBA for the last 12 years of his 20 years teaching at PBA, and that students were instructed to come to their own stance and conclusions. He filed a discrimination complaint with EEOC with hopes to establish adequate academic freedom for PBA faculty.

PBA does not offer professors tenure.

PBA's diversity statement, which was adopted by the PBA board of trustees in April 2021, says that "no form of racism, racial supremacy, ableism, or ethnic bigotry will be tolerated at [PBA]."

The American Association of University Professors (AAUP) investigated Joeckel's situation. In a letter to PBA president Debra Schwinn, AAUP Senior Program Officer Michael DeCesare wrote that Joeckel "was abruptly terminated prior to the end of (PBA's) term after complaints were made regarding his teaching a unit on racial justice... We hope you appreciate that if allegations against faculty members were commonly handled in this manner at Palm Beach Atlantic University, academic freedom and due process would have little meaning."

The Foundation for Individual Rights in Education (FIRE) issued a faculty letter condemning PBA's decision and supporting Joeckel. The letter stated, "We are deeply concerned about the state of academic freedom at Palm Beach Atlantic University after PBA fired English professor Samuel Joeckel because material in the racial justice unit of his composition course was deemed to be 'indoctrinating students.'" Like the AAUP, FIRE wrote a letter to PBA and "urged the university to reaffirm its commitment to academic freedom and renew professor Joeckel's contract." PBA never responded to this letter.

In 2024, the civil dispute between Joeckel and PBA was settled out of court.

== Ministry life ==
Chapel is held at PBA four times weekly in the DeSantis Family Chapel, Monday through Thursday at 11 a.m., as well as other times, dates and locations that are listed on PBA's chapel calendar. Chapel is a requirement for all full-time undergrad students. PBA students must attend 24 chapels per year.

"Workship" is PBA's community service program that seeks to respond to human needs with Christ-like action in the community and throughout the world, with the intention that such community service might help PBA students discern their vocation and develop a lifelong habit of servant leadership. Since it was established at PBA in 1968, PBA's Workship program has partnered with over 200 organizations in Palm Beach County. In spring 2024, PBA celebrated 4 million hours of Workship, a major milestone in PBA's history.

PBA mission trips are offered yearly for PBA students. PBA mission teams travel to countries all over the world and minister through evangelism, performing arts, street ministries, construction, medical outreach, sports workshops and more. The PBA teams travel during the summer on a multi-week trip and on a one-week spring break trip.

== Athletics ==
The PBA athletic teams are called the Sailfish. PBA's colors are navy blue and white. PBA is a member of the NCAA Division II ranks, primarily competing in the Sunshine State Conference (SSC) since the 2015–2016 academic year as a provisional member for most their sports (achieving D-II full member status in 2016–2017); while PBA's men's and women's track & field teams compete as NCAA D-II Independents as the conference does not sponsor these sports. The PBA Sailfish previously competed as an NCAA D-II Independent from 2003–2004 to 2014–2015; and in the Florida Sun Conference (FSC; now currently known as the Sun Conference since the 2008–2009 school year) of the National Association of Intercollegiate Athletics (NAIA) from 1990–1991 to 2002–2003.

PBA competes in 18 intercollegiate varsity sports: PBA men's sports include baseball, basketball, cross country, golf, lacrosse, soccer, tennis and track & field; while PBA women's sports include basketball, beach volleyball, cross country, golf, lacrosse, soccer, softball, tennis, track & field and volleyball.

=== Facilities ===
PBA's Marshall and Vera Lea Rinker Athletic Campus has beach volleyball, soccer, lacrosse, baseball, softball, tennis, and running trails as well as a new state of the art weight and training rooms. PBA's 34,000 sq ft (3,200 m^{2}) building houses locker rooms and meeting rooms as well as PBA Athletics offices.

=== Mascot ===
The sailfish is a predatory billfish, distinguished by its prominent dorsal fin and ability to accelerate to speeds unmatched by any other fish, up to 68 mph. When PBA was founded in 1968, PBA founders looked to nautical themes for PBA's varsity athletic teams. The sailfish is reflected in PBA's current athletics logo.

== Notable alumni ==
- Lizbeth Benacquisto: Member of the Florida Senate
- Grant Horvat: Golfer and YouTuber
- Victoria Jackson: Actress and former Saturday Night Live cast member
- Marty Kiar: Broward County Property Appraiser
- Brian Mast (attended): Member of the U.S. House of Representatives
- Ruthie Ann Miles: Broadway actress, 2015 Tony Award winner for The King & I
- Jennifer Rothschild: Author and speaker
- Susan Sherouse: American violinist
- Priscilla Taylor: Member of the Florida House of Representatives
- Tenth Avenue North: Contemporary Christian music band
