= Jökull =

Jökull is the name of:

- Jökull Andrésson, Icelandic footballer
- Jökull Júlíusson, Icelandic singer
- Jökull (journal), Icelandic academic journal
