= Samuel Joeckel =

U.S. author and professor of English

Academic background
- Education: University of Nevada, Las Vegas; Baylor University; Claremont Graduate University
- Doctoral advisor: Marc Redfield

Academic work
- Discipline: English language
- Institutions: Palm Beach Atlantic University

Samuel T. Joeckel, cousin of former NFL lineman Luke Joeckel, is an American author, professor of English, and accomplished mountain biker. He is one of the world's top experts of author C. S. Lewis. Joeckel is the author of three books, The C.S. Lewis Phenomenon, The Christian College Phenomenon, and Golden Notes. He has also published many articles on 18th Century British Literature. He is also the co-editor of a volume about Christian colleges. He taught at Palm Beach Atlantic University for over 20 years until his termination in March 2023.

== Life ==
Joeckel earned a B.A. from the University of Nevada, Las Vegas. He completed an M.A. at Baylor University. He earned a Ph.D. from Claremont Graduate University. His 2002 dissertation was titled, "The fiction of happiness": eighteenth-century experience, epistemology, and aesthetics. Marc Redfield was his doctoral advisor.

Joeckel was a professor of English at Palm Beach Atlantic University's School of Liberal Arts and Sciences for over 20 years. On February 15, 2023, his contract was put on hold after the university received complaints regarding his teachings on racial justice. Dr. Joeckel stated that he was notified of his contract investigation the same day Governor Ron DeSantis would be arriving on campus to give a speech. After stepping out of his classroom, Dr. Joeckel's dean and provost were waiting for him, and the dean handed him an envelope notifying him of the investigation. Joeckel stated, "The letter inside [the envelope] was to notify me that my contract was being delayed pending a review of the material I use in my racial justice unit" as part of his Composition II course. He taught about Martin Luther King Jr., Malcolm X and Frederick Douglas in the racial justice unit. Soon, Dr. Joeckel posted on Instagram that his position was on hold pending an investigation on his course materials. Soon, PBAU school provost Chelly Templeton stated in a leaked internal university memo, " 'Faculty are free to choose a theme that unifies their Composition II course, . . . [h]owever, it is important that the Composition II objectives remain the focus of the course.' " When questioned as to what was wrong with Joeckels' unit on racial justice, Robert Lloyd, Palm Beach Atlantic University's Dean of Liberal Arts and Sciences, told Joeckel he was "indoctrinating students".

On March 15, the university terminated Joeckel's contract, stemming from a complaint received from a student's parent directly to the college president, Dr. Debra A Schwinn, about his unit on racial justice. The parent complained he was " 'indoctrinating' students by teaching about racial justice".

Diversity is stated as one of Palm Beach Atlantic university's core values, where they aim to promote racial equality for all. They state that, "no form of racism, racial supremacy, ableism, or ethnic bigotry will be tolerated at Palm Beach Atlantic University.

Joeckel stated the reason behind his contract non-renewal was because, "his university was “'influenced' by the 'toxic political ideology' of Florida Gov. Ron DeSantis (R)."

Palm Beach Atlantic University offered Joeckel no hearing, no meeting, or no panel discussion. The complaining parent never spoke with him, nor was he given any reasonable explanation for his termination. They do not offer tenure protection to professors at Palm Beach Atlantic University, no matter how long they've served in their positions.

The American Association of University Professors (AAUP) investigated Joeckel's situation. In a letter to PBAU president Debra Schwinn, AAUP Senior Program Officer Michael DeCesare wrote that Joeckel "was abruptly terminated prior to the end of (the university's) term after complaints were made regarding his teaching a unit on racial justice... We hope you appreciate that if allegations against faculty members were commonly handled in this manner at Palm Beach Atlantic University, academic freedom and due process would have little meaning."

The Foundation for Individual Rights in Education (FIRE) issued a faculty letter condemning PBAU's decision and supporting Joeckel. The letter stated, "We are deeply concerned about the state of academic freedom at Palm Beach Atlantic University after PBA fired English professor Samuel Joeckel because material in the racial justice unit of his composition course was deemed to be 'indoctrinating students.'" The letter continues, "We join FIRE in condemning Palm Beach Atlantic’s choice not to renew Joeckel’s contract, a decision which violated Joeckel’s rights and casts an impermissible chilling effect over other professors who may fear that teaching controversial material could jeopardize their jobs. We urge Palm Beach Atlantic to reaffirm its commitment to academic freedom and to pledge that it will refrain from retaliation against professors for their protected expression." This letter was signed by sixty-six professors from around the United States.

Like the AAUP, FIRE wrote a letter to PBAU and "urged the university to reaffirm its commitment to academic freedom and renew professor Joeckel’s contract." PBAU never responded to this letter.

In 2024, the civil dispute between Joeckel and PBAU was settled out of court.

== Mountain Biking ==
In 2014, Joeckel won the championship in the Coconut Cup series in the 40+ Sport age division. Joeckel won three of the seven rounds in that series, located in mountain-bike parks around south Florida. In 2015, he teamed with Ed Lis to win the Hammerhead 100 in the two-person relay division at the Santos trail system in Ocala, Florida. Also in 2015, he won the Miami Man Half-Iron Duathlon. In 2016, he finished second in the 40+ expert class in the Coconut Cup. In 2017, he was the expert champion in the Florida Endurance Race Series. He won two of the seven rounds in that series: the Battle of Snow Hill in Orlando, Florida, and Six Hours of Haile in Newberry, Florida.

== Selected works ==
- Joeckel, Samuel; Chesnes, Thomas, eds. (2012). The Christian College Phenomenon: Inside America's Fastest Growing Institutions of Higher Learning. Abilene Christian University Press. ISBN 978-0-89112-284-5.
- Joeckel, Samuel (2013). The C. S. Lewis Phenomenon: Christianity and the Public Sphere. Mercer University Press. ISBN 978-0-88146-437-5.
- Joeckel, Samuel (2016-05-26). Golden Notes. Tressler Press. ISBN 978-0-692-69418-3.
