= Via crucis (album) =

Via Crucis

Studio album by Fabio Mengozzi
- Released: 2022
- Recorded: 2022
- Genre: Contemporary classical music
- Length: 28:23

Fabio Mengozzi chronology
| Romanza alla Terra (2022) | Via Crucis (2022) | Musica con creta (2023) |

Via Crucis is an album by Italian pianist and composer Fabio Mengozzi, released in 2022.

== Track listing ==
1. Notte nell'orto del Getsemani – 2:17
2. Gesù è tradito e condannato a morte – 1:46
3. Gesù è caricato della croce – 4:07
4. Gesù cade per la prima volta – 2:06
5. Gesù incontra sua madre – 1:48
6. Simone di Cirene aiuta Gesù a portare la croce – 1:32
7. Veronica asciuga il volto di Gesù – 1:28
8. Gesù cade per la seconda volta – 1:14
9. Gesù incontra le donne piangenti di Gerusalemme – 2:23
10. Gesù cade per la terza volta – 1:27
11. Gesù è spogliato delle vesti – 1:06
12. Gesù è inchiodato sulla croce – 2:28
13. Gesù muore in croce – 3:34
14. Gesù è deposto dalla croce – 1:11
15. Il corpo di Gesù è deposto nel sepolcro – 0:48
