= Agony in the Garden (disambiguation) =

The Agony in the Garden was an event in the life of Jesus.

Agony in the Garden may also refer to:

== Paintings ==
- Agony in the Garden with the Donor Louis I of Orléans, French, 1405–1408
- Agony in the Garden (Bellini), by Giovanni Bellini, c. 1459–1465
- Agony in the Garden (Blake), by William Blake, 1799–1800
- Agony in the Garden (Correggio), 1524
- Agony in the Garden (David), by Gerard David, c. 1510–1520
- Agony in the Garden (El Greco, Andújar), 1597–1607
- Agony in the Garden (El Greco, London), 1590
- Agony in the Garden (Mantegna, London), by Andrea Mantegna, 1458–1460
- Agony in the Garden (Mantegna, Tours), by Andrea Mantegna, 1457–1459
- Agony in the Garden (Perugino), by Pietro Perugino, c. 1483–1493
- Agony in the Garden, by Raphael from the predella of the altarpiece Madonna and Child Enthroned with Saints, c. 1503–1505
- Agony in the Garden, by Sheila Mackie, early 1960s

== Other ==
- Agony in the Garden, two engravings by Albrecht Dürer, 1508 and 1515
- The Agony in the Garden, a copper relief by Angelo de Rossi, c. 1700
- The Agony in the Garden, a print by Master I. A. M. of Zwolle, late 1400s
