= Gethsemane (disambiguation) =

Gethsemane is a garden in Jerusalem believed to be the place where Jesus and his disciples prayed the night before the crucifixion.

Gethsemane may also refer to:

== Arts and entertainment ==
- Gethsemane (oratorio), a 1998 chamber-oratorio by Matthew King
- Garden of Gethsemane (novel), a 1950 novel by Ivan Bahrianyi
- Gethsemane (play), a 2008 play by David Hare
- "Gethsemane" (The X-Files), a 1997 television episode

=== Songs ===
- "Gethsemane", by Conception from Flow, 1997
- "Gethsemane", by Dry the River from Alarms in the Heart, 2014
- "Gethsemane", by Nightwish from Oceanborn, 1998
- "Gethsemane", by Om from Advaitic Songs, 2012
- "Gethsemane", by Peter Gabriel from Passion, 1989
- "Gethsemane", by Richard Thompson from The Old Kit Bag, 2003
- "Gethsemane", by Rise Against from The Unraveling, 2005 reissue
- "Gethsemane (I Only Want to Say)", from the musical Jesus Christ Superstar, 1971
- "Gethsemane", by Car Seat Headrest, from The Scholars, 2025
- "Gethsemane", by Sleep Token, from Even in Arcadia, 2025

== Religious buildings ==
- Abbey of Our Lady of Gethsemani, near Bardstown, Kentucky, US
- Gethsemane Episcopal Church (disambiguation)
- Gethsemane Evangelical Church, Berlin, Germany
- Gethsemane Evangelical Lutheran Church, Detroit, Michigan, US
- Gethsemane Lutheran Church, Austin, Texas, US

== Other uses ==
- Gethsemane Cemetery, in Bergen County, New Jersey, US
- Gethsemane Man-made Forest, a conservation project in Assam, India
- Gethsemane, a place or occasion of great mental or spiritual suffering (Merriam-Webster dictionary)

== See also ==
- Agony in the Garden, the Gethsemane episode in the life of Jesus
- Agony in the Garden (disambiguation), depictions of the Gethsemane episode in art
