= Agony in the Garden (Bellini) =

Painting by Giovanni Bellini

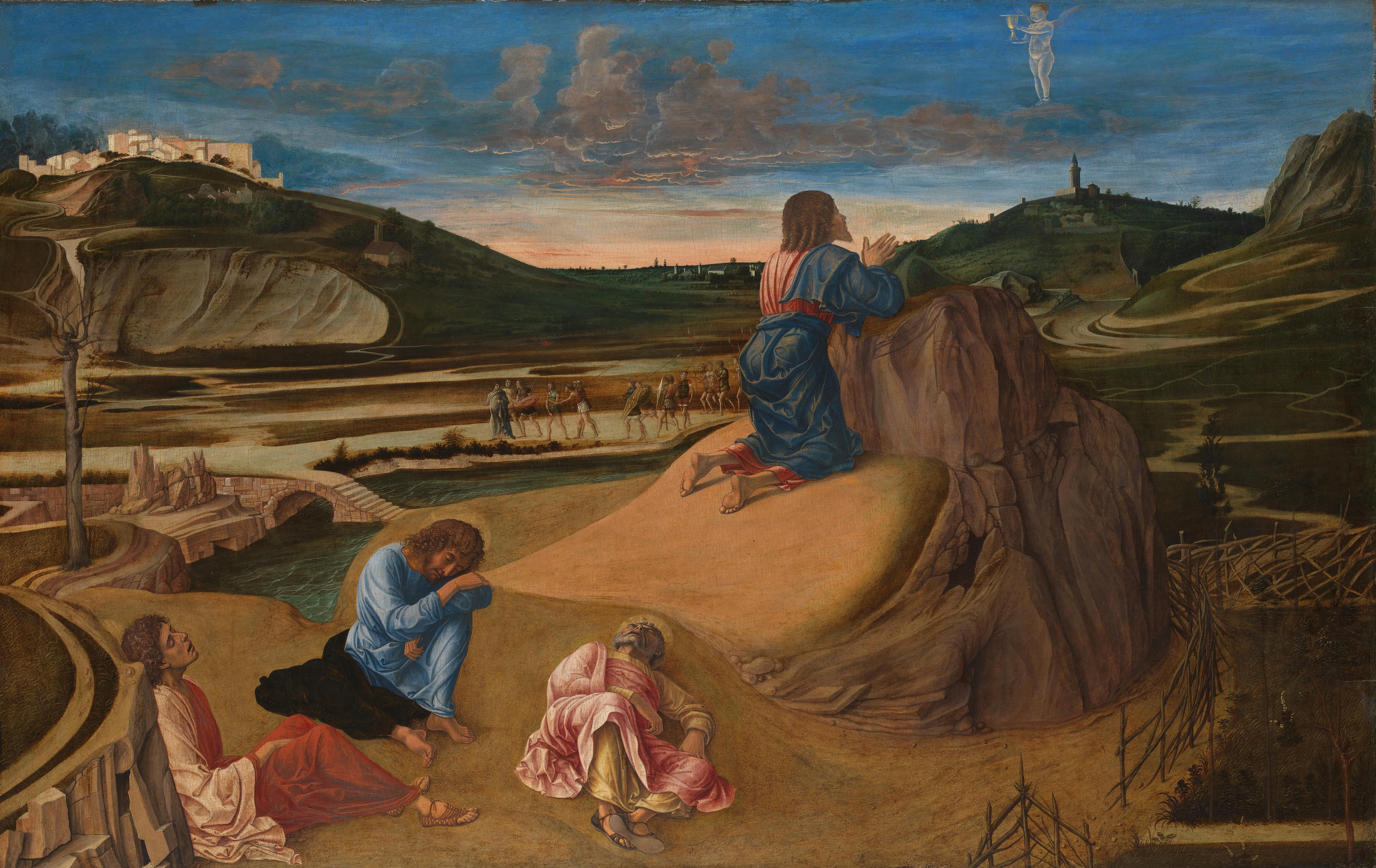
- Artist: Giovanni Bellini
- Year: c. 1459–1465
- Medium: Tempera on panel
- Dimensions: 81 cm × 127 cm (32 in × 50 in)
- Location: National Gallery, London

The Agony in the Garden is an early painting by the Italian Renaissance master Giovanni Bellini, who created it c. 1459–1465. It is a tempera painting on panel and is now in the National Gallery, London.

This work portrays the Agony in the Garden with Christ kneeling on the Mount of Olives in prayer, with his disciples Peter, James and John sleeping near to him. In the background, Judas leads the Roman soldiers to capture Christ.

The picture is closely related to the similar work by Bellini's brother-in-law, Andrea Mantegna, also in the National Gallery. It is likely that both derived from a drawing by Bellini's father, Jacopo. In Bellini's version, the treatment of dawn light has a more important role in giving the scene a quasi-unearthly atmosphere.

== Background and history ==
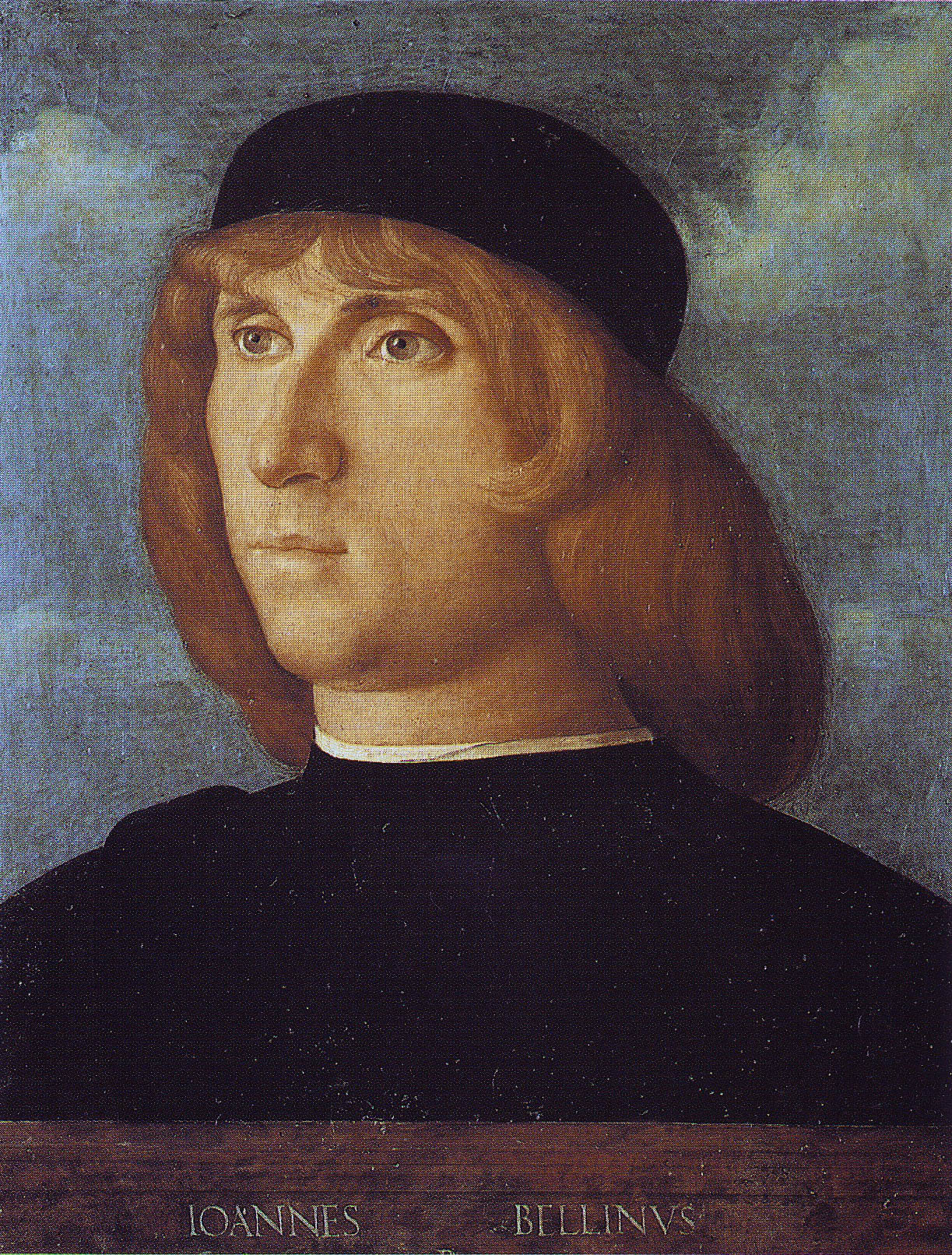
Giovanni Bellini: Self-Portrait, c. 1500

Giovanni Bellini is widely recognized as not only one of the foremost artists of Quattrocento Venice but of the entirety of the Italian Renaissance. Bellini's art often focused on landscapes with devotional subject matter, where his bold usage of color unites subject and form.

Bellini almost exclusively spent the majority of his life in his native Venice, seeming to have only ventured out once to sketch the landscape off the Adriatic coast in the mid-1470s. This deep appreciation for the Northern Italian countryside finds its way into Agony in the Garden, where the three hill settlements in the background are evocative of Italian towns of the time, transporting this biblical event tangibly to the contemporary Italian viewers of his work.

The painting was amongst five paintings including Bellini's Portrait of a Mathematician that was damaged in a suffragette protest by Grace Marcon (aka Frieda Graham) in 1914. She was sentenced to six months but she was released the next month, weak from a hunger strike protest.

== Influences ==
Bellini's Agony in the Garden is displayed side-by-side with Andrea Mantegna's work of the same name in the National Gallery. Mantegna was Bellini's brother-in-law, and his influence on Bellini is apparent; in fact, Bellini's rendering of Agony in the Garden was long-believed to be painted by Mantegna. These two works were inspired by an earlier drawing by Giovanni's father and Mantegna's father-in-law, Jacopo Bellini.

Bellini's work marks a noticeable shift from the even illumination and equality in the intensity of the forms, seen in Mantegna's painting, commonplace in fifteenth-century Italian art. While Mantegna's painting is lit by even illumination and clarity of atmosphere, Bellini's painting introduces a sense of time and ambiance, as seen in the sky's radiant illumination of light emanating from the praying Christ.

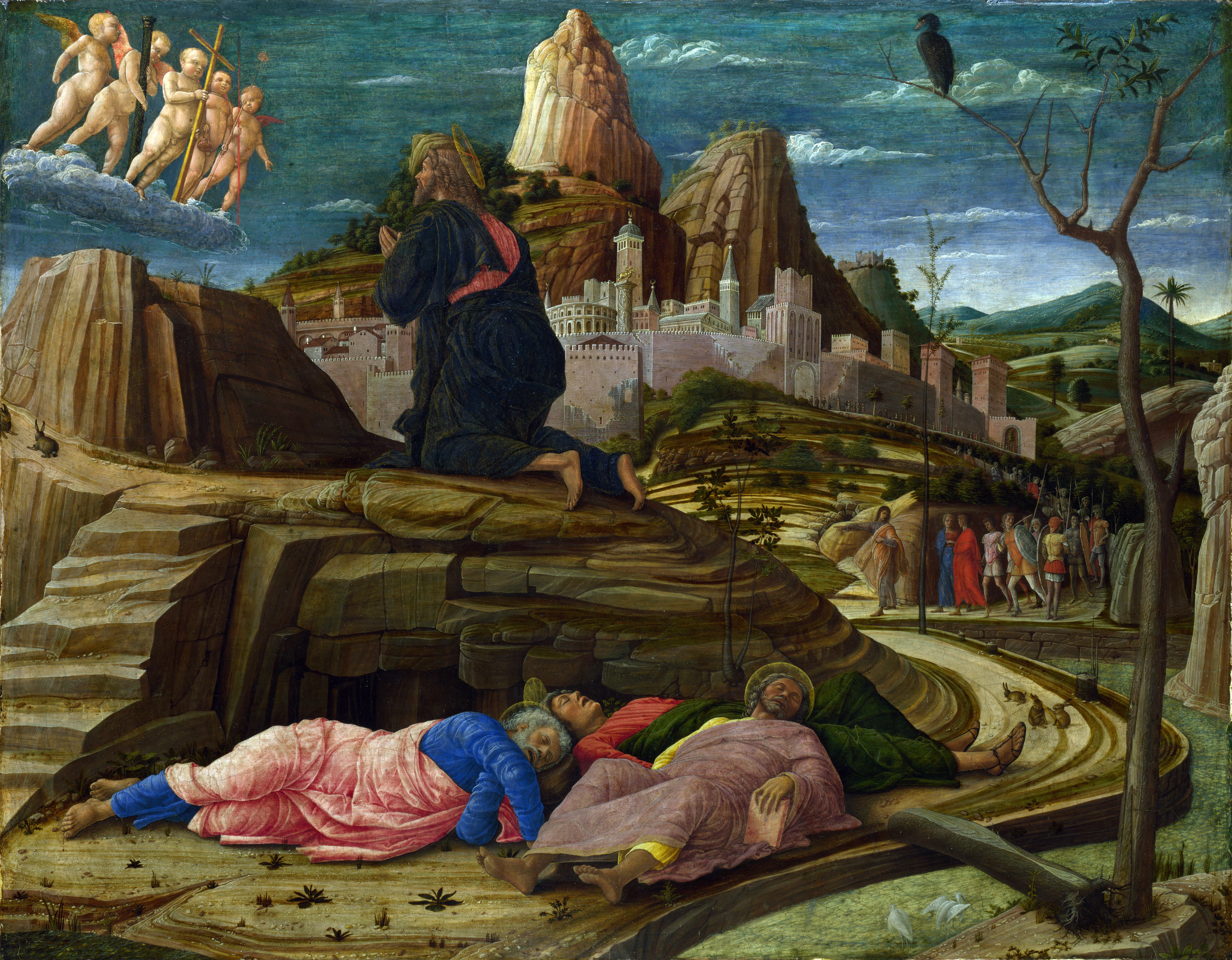
Andrea Mantegna: Agony in the Garden, 1455–56

== Composition and analysis ==
Agony in the Garden is an egg tempera painting on wood panel, most likely painted on poplar, as is common of Bellini's wood panel works. Bellini coated the wood panel with a gesso ground and provided an intricate underdrawing applied with a liquid medium, which provide the painting with a great complexity in texture especially seen in the tunic of Jesus.

Bellini's painting situates the viewer at a great crossroads in the life of Jesus. The painting cannot visually represent Jesus's words "Let this cup pass from me", nor his insistence to his disciples to stay awake with him, nor his final acceptance of his fate. Yet Bellini captures the great gravity of the situation.

Bellini blends the natural with the human world, which is highlighted by the figure of Christ: his hands up in prayer over a natural rock formation that takes the form of an altar. Bellini even evokes the details of sound in this silent medium of painting through his depiction of the apostles sleeping below Christ. The figure of St. Peter is portrayed reclined with his mouth agape in deep rest, adding realism to the scene.

== Ownership ==
Until the mid-19th century Early Renaissance paintings were regarded as curiosities by most collectors. This one had probably belonged to Consul Smith in Venice (d. 1770), was bought by William Beckford at the Joshua Reynolds sale in 1795 for £5, then sold in 1823 with Fonthill Abbey and repurchased by Beckford at the Fonthill Sale the next year (as a Mantegna) for £52.10s. It was bought by the National Gallery for £630 in 1863, still a low price for the day.

== See also ==
- List of works by Giovanni Bellini
