= Gethsemani =

Gethsemani may refer to:

- Gethsemane, a garden in Jerusalem believed to be the place where Jesus and his disciples prayed the night before the crucifixion
- Abbey of Our Lady of Gethsemani, Bardstown, Kentucky, U.S.
- Getsemaní, a district in the old town of Cartagena, Colombia; see Puerta del Reloj, Cartagena
- Gethsémani, a former name of La Romaine, Quebec, Canada

== See also ==
- Gethsemane (disambiguation)
