= Grace Marcon =

British suffragette (1889–1965)

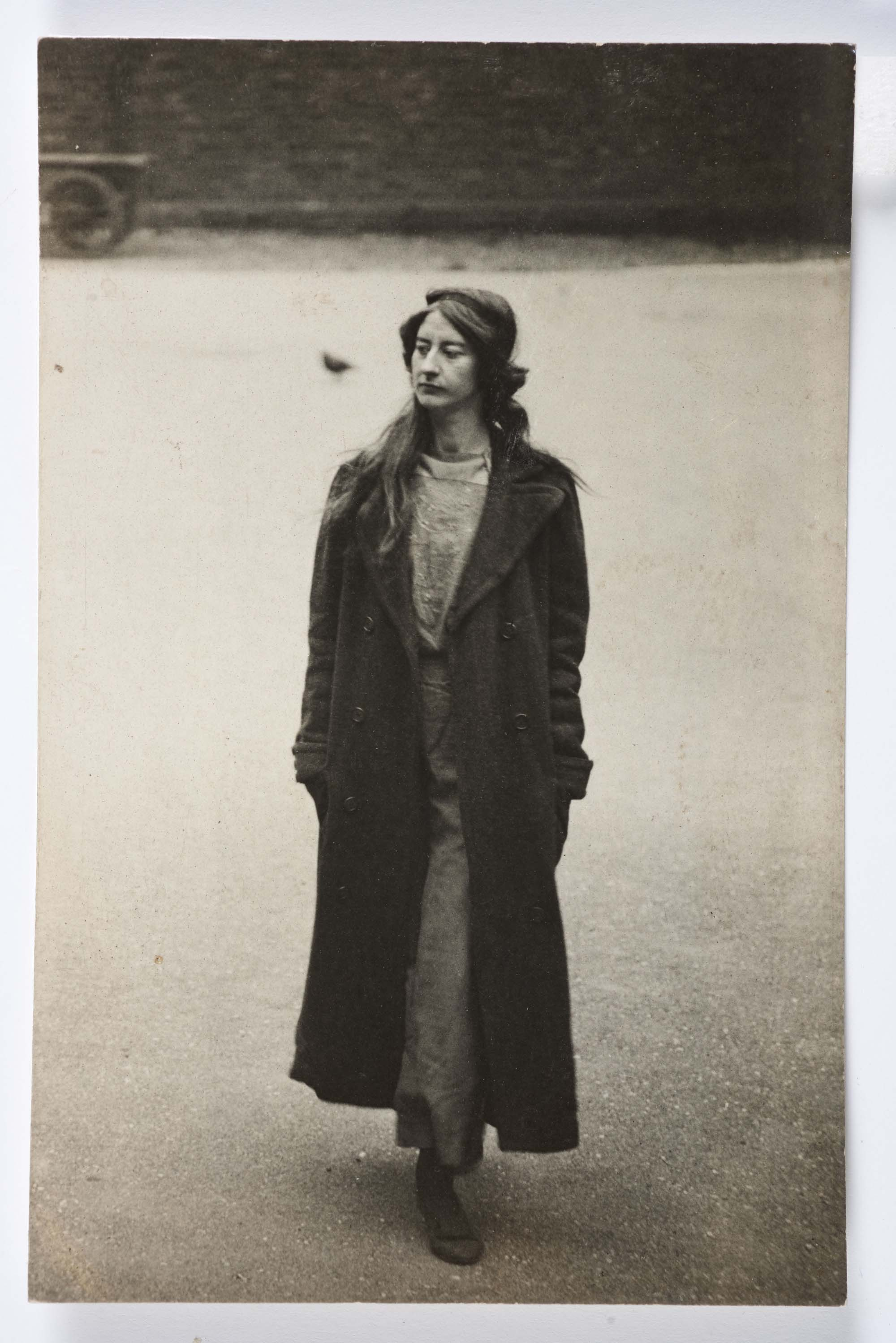
- Grace Marcon in 1913 at Holloway Prison
- Born: 1889; Erpingham, England, United Kingdom of Great Britain and Ireland
- Died: 1965 (aged 75–76); Oxford, England, United Kingdom
- Known for: Militant suffragette who damaged 5 paintings

Grace Marcon also known as Frieda Graham (1889–1965) was a British suffragette who damaged five paintings in the National Gallery including Giovanni Bellini's The Agony in The Garden and Gentile Bellini's Portrait of a Mathematician.

== Life ==
Marcon was born in Erpingham in 1889. Her mother was named Sarah and her father was Canon Walter Marcon and he was the rector of the parish of Edgefield in Norfolk from 1876.

In 1911 she was at home in Norfolk. Marcon would demonstrate in Norwich market for the suffragettes.

She became a suffragette and she was released from court with an obligation to keep the peace after she was arrested in 1913. Her arrest arose from a disagreement between the police and protesting suffragettes led by Sylvia Pankhurst. This was in May 1913 and by October she was back in the courts charged with obstruction and assault. Marcon was given a sentence of two months in Holloway Prison. Marcon was photographed secretly whilst in Holloway prison together with other arrested suffragettes. Photos of these women could then be circulated to the police so that they were aware of the potential damage.

By 1914 she was using the name Frieda Graham and it was under that name that she was arrested after she had damaged Giovanni Bellini's The Agony in The Garden and Gentile Bellini's Portrait of a Mathematician and at least three other paintings in the National Gallery on 22 May 1914. She said that she had done the damage in protest because the king had refused to see a deputation of women. She was imprisoned and released again when she was said to have cut off her hair whilst recovering from this hunger strike. Marcon was given a Hunger Strike Medal to commemorate her valour.

During the war Marcon worked as Red Cross masseuse and this appears to be how she first met Victor Scholey. Scholey was a press photographer and in 1923 Marcon worked her way across Canada to marry him in Quebec. By 1926 she was back alone in England with a son. She was still in touch with Emmeline Pankhurst and all women did not get the vote until 1928.

== Death ==
Marcon died in Oxford in 1965 and was buried in Edgefield.
