= Agony in the Garden =

Episode from the life of Jesus Christ

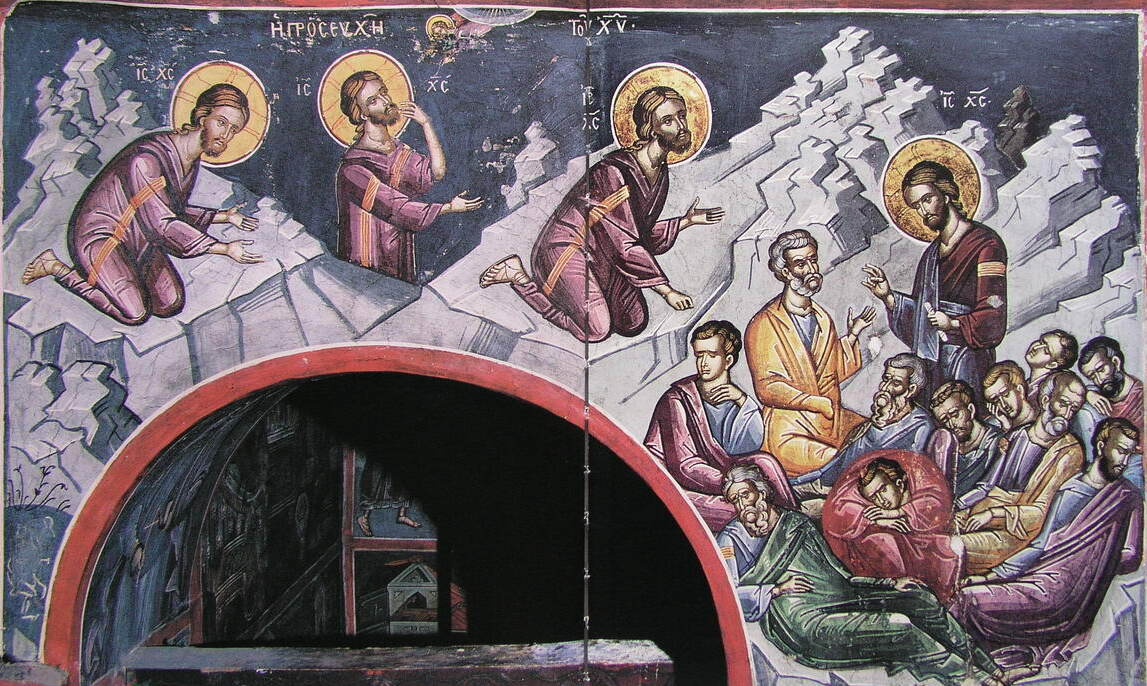
A 1547 fresco by Theophanes the Cretan in Dionysiou Monastery, Mount Athos, sequentially depicting Jesus praying and admonishing the Apostles for falling asleep

The Agony in the Garden of Gethsemane is an episode in the life of Jesus, which occurred after the Last Supper and before his betrayal and arrest, all part of the Passion of Jesus leading to his crucifixion and death. This episode is described in the three Synoptic Gospels in the New Testament. According to these accounts, Jesus, accompanied by three of his apostles, Peter, John and James, enters the garden of Gethsemane on the Mount of Olives where he experiences great anguish and prays to be delivered from his impending suffering, while also accepting God's will.

This episode is a significant event in Christian tradition, especially in Catholic devotional practices. The agony of Jesus in the Garden is the first (or second) station of the Scriptural Way of the Cross (modern version of the Via Crucis) and the first "sorrowful mystery" of the Dominican Rosary, and it is the inspiration for the Holy Hour devotion in the Eucharistic adoration. It has been a frequent theme in Christian art depicting the life of Jesus from the beginning. It is part of the 6th-century mosaic cycle with scenes from the Passion of Christ in the Basilica of Sant'Apollinare Nuovo in Ravenna. The earliest known surviving illuminated manuscript of the New Testament, the Rossano Gospels, probably from 6th-century Syria written in Greek, comprises a depiction of Christ in the Garden of Gethsemane.

== Gospel narratives ==
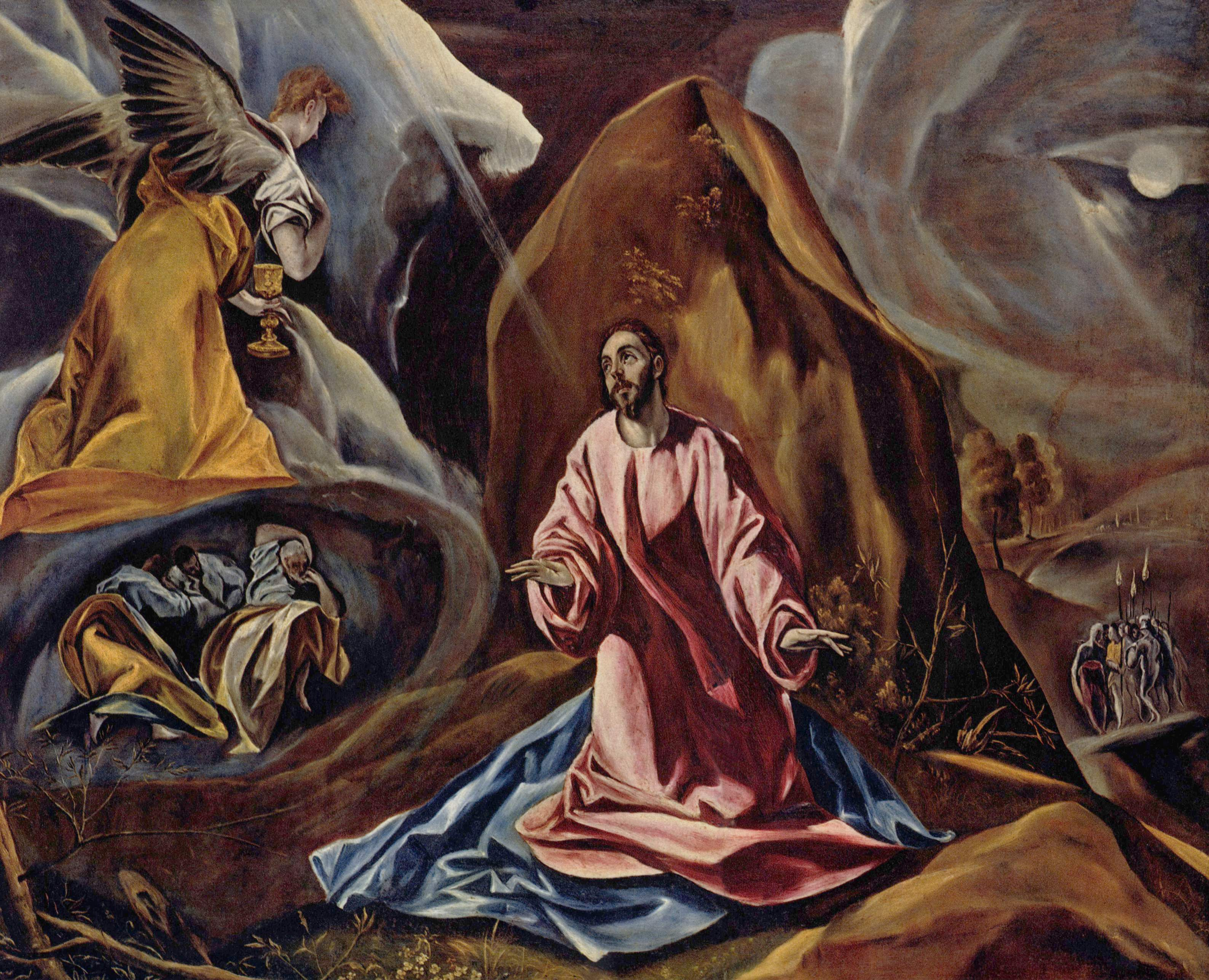
Agony in the Garden by El Greco, c. 1590

According to the Synoptic Gospels, immediately after the Last Supper, Jesus retreated to a garden to pray. Each gospel offers a slightly different account regarding narrative details. The gospels of Matthew and Mark identify this place of prayer as Gethsemane. Jesus was accompanied by three Apostles: Peter, John and James, whom he asked to stay awake and pray. He moved "a stone's throw away" from them, where he felt overwhelming sadness and anguish, and said "My Father, if it is possible, let this cup pass me by. Nevertheless, let it be as You, not I, would have it." Then, a little while later, he said, "If this cup cannot pass by, but I must drink it, Your will be done!" (Matthew 26:42; in Latin Vulgate: fiat voluntas tua) He said this prayer thrice, checking on the three apostles after each prayer and finding them asleep. He commented: "The spirit is willing, but the flesh is weak". An angel came from heaven to strengthen him. During his agony as he prayed, "His sweat was, as it were, great drops of blood falling down upon the ground" (Luke 22:44).

At the conclusion of the narrative, Jesus accepts that the hour has come for him to be betrayed.

== Tradition ==
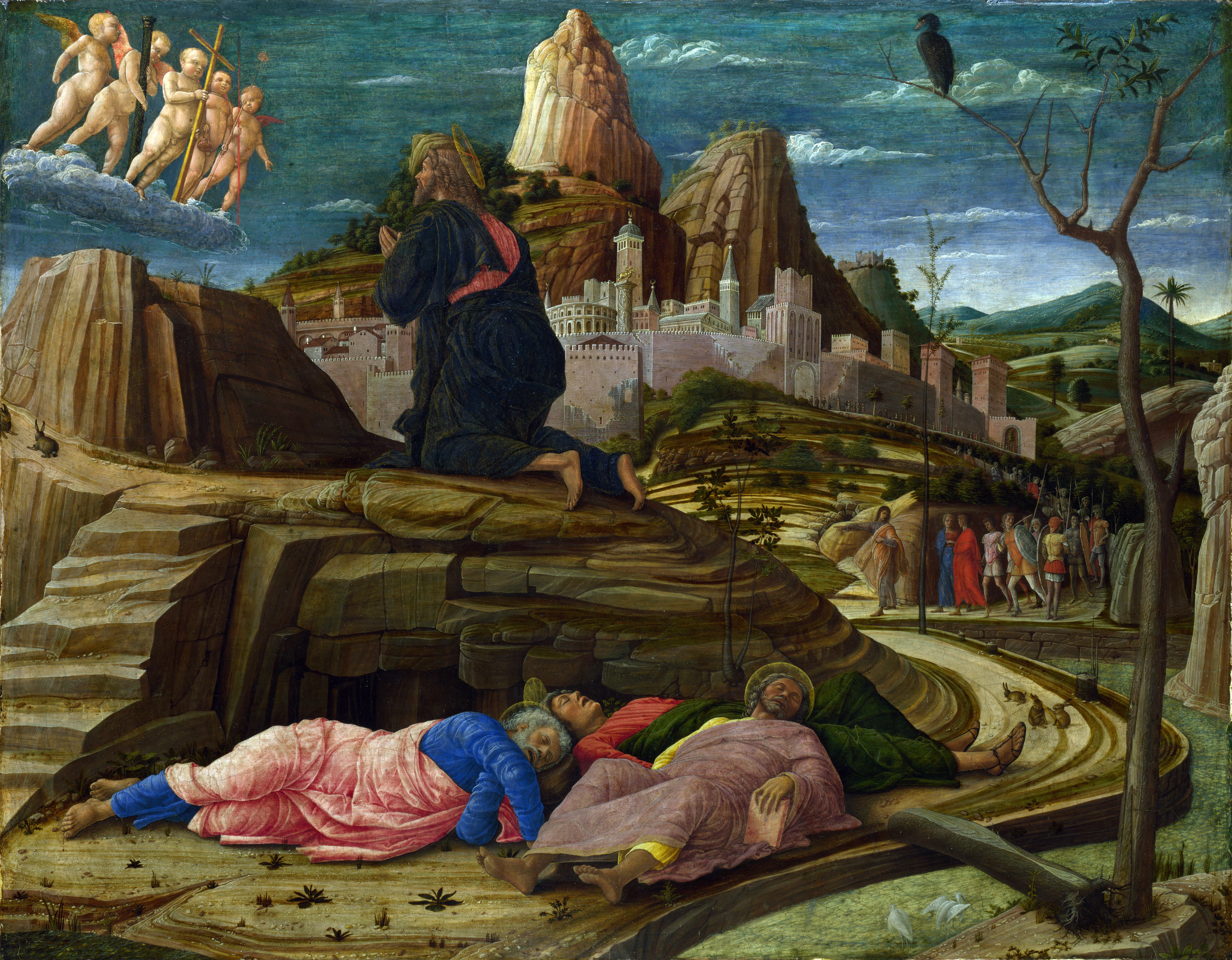
In Agony in the Garden, Jesus prays in the garden after the Last Supper while the disciples sleep and Judas leads the mob, by Andrea Mantegna c. 1460.

In Roman Catholic tradition, the Agony in the Garden is the first Sorrowful Mystery of the Rosary and the First Station of the Scriptural Way of the Cross (second station in the Philippine version). Catholic tradition includes specific prayers and devotions. These Acts of Reparation to Jesus Christ do not involve a petition for a living or dead beneficiary, but aim to "repair the sins" against Jesus. Traditionally, prayers honoring the Agony in the Garden are most influential during the Holy Hour. Some such prayers are provided in the Raccolta Catholic prayer book (approved by a Decree of 1854, and published by the Holy See in 1898) which also includes prayers as Acts of Reparation to the Virgin Mary. Furthermore, Passio Domini, a central devotion in the spirituality of Opus Angelorum, is strongly centered on the Agony in the Garden.

In his encyclical Miserentissimus Redemptor on reparations, Pope Pius XI called Acts of Reparation to Jesus Christ a duty for Catholics and referred to them as "some sort of compensation to be rendered for the injury" with respect to the sufferings of Jesus.

Catholic tradition holds that Jesus's sweating of blood was literal and not figurative.

== Holy Hour ==
In the Catholic tradition, Matthew 26:40 is the basis of the Holy Hour devotion for Eucharistic adoration. In the Gospel of Matthew:

Then He said to them, 'My soul is very sorrowful even to death; remain here, and watch with Me.'

— Matthew 26:38

Coming to the disciples, Jesus found them sleeping and, in Matthew 26:40, asked Peter: "So, could you not watch with Me one hour?"

The tradition of the Holy Hour devotion dates back to 1673 when Saint Margaret Mary Alacoque stated that she had a vision of Jesus in which she was instructed to spend an hour every Thursday night to meditate on the suffering of Jesus in the Garden of Gethsemane.

== Commentary ==
Martin Pable, OFM Cap suggests that Jesus experienced fear, loneliness, and perhaps a sense of failure.

Justus Knecht gives three possible causes for Christ's sadness and agony:

1. He saw before him the many and inhuman torments which awaited him. He pictured all these terrible sufferings, enduring them in anticipation.
2. Christ took the sins of men on himself, so as to offer satisfaction to the divine justice in their stead. Now that he was on the point of completing his work of redemption, the horrible mass of evil, abomination and guilt came before his soul and filled it with abhorrence and aversion.
3. He knew beforehand how many souls would be eternally lost in spite of his bitter Passion and death, because they would not believe in him and would not love him.

Roger Baxter in his Meditations reflects on the angel comforting Christ, writing, "Good God! is it possible that the eternal Son of God should borrow comfort from His creatures? Observe how the Father of lights at last sends comfort to those who persevere in prayer. Imagine what reasons the angel might use in comforting your agonizing Saviour. He probably represented to Him the necessity of His passion for the redemption of mankind, and the glory that would redound to His Father and Himself. All this Christ understood infinitely better than the angel, yet He did not refuse the proffer of consolation, in order to teach you to respect the advice and consolation of your inferiors."

== Artistic depictions ==
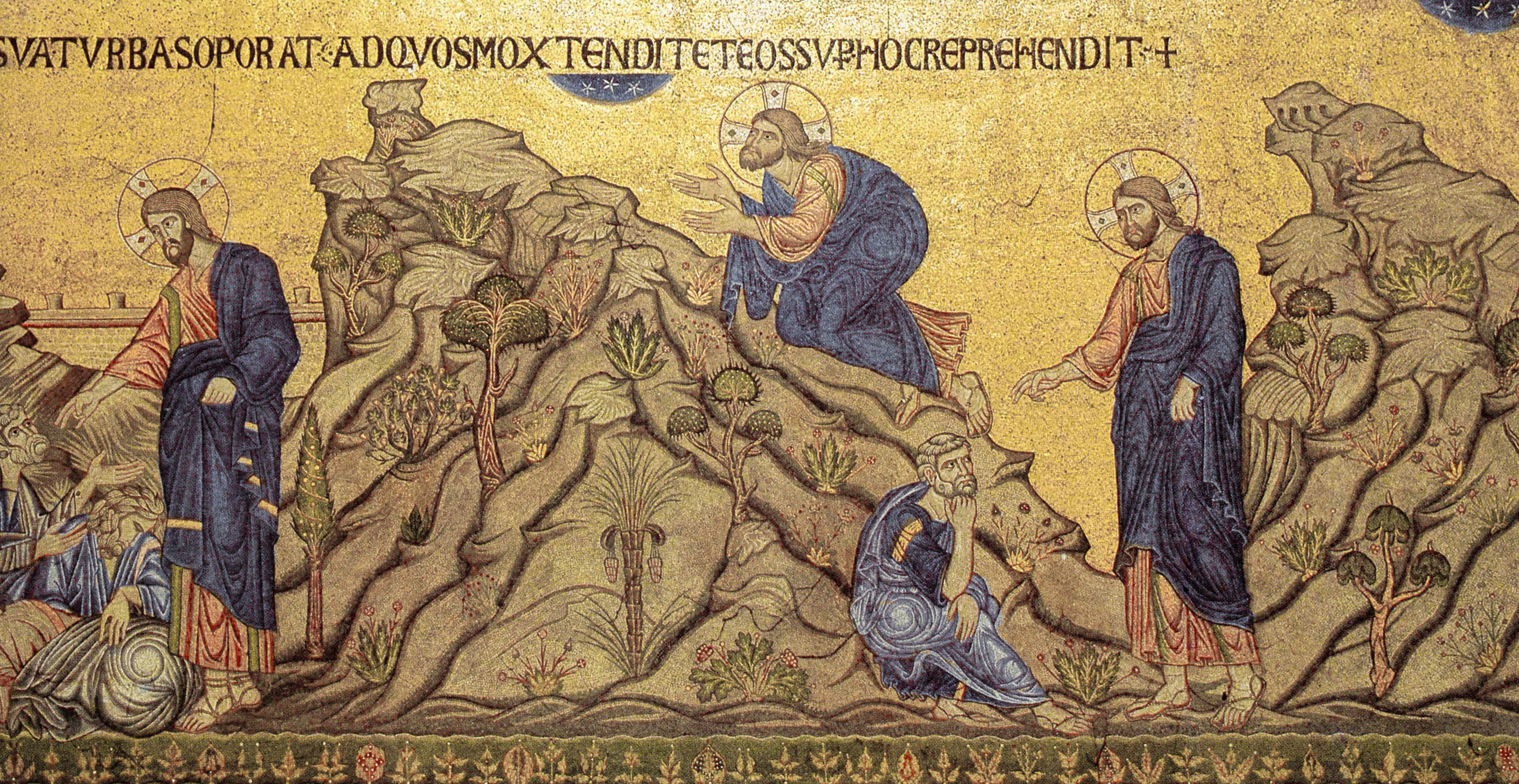
Basilica di San Marco, Venice (13th ct.)

There are a number of different pictorial depictions of the Agony in the Garden, including:

=== Miniatures in illuminated manuscripts ===
- Codex purpureus Rossanensis, Byzantine illuminated manuscript in Greek, Syria, 6th century, Diocesan Museum Rossano (Calabria)
- Book of Gelati, Georgian, 12th ct., in Georgian scripts, Georgian National Centre of Manuscripts, Tbilisi (Q908, 163v)
- Agony in the Garden and Betrayal of Christ, Royal Psalter, British Gothic, c. 1270, MET, New York (sf22-24-4s1)
- Passional of Abbess Kunigunde, Bohemia, early Luxembourg court workshop[?], 1312–21, National Library of the Czech Republic, Prague (XIV A 17, fol. 10r)
- Jacquemart de Hesdin, Très Riches Heures du Duc de Berry, 1400–10, Bibliothèque nationale de France, Paris (Latin 919, fol. 69)
- Hours of Mary of Burgundy, 1477, Austrian National Library, Vienna (Cod. 1857, 56v)
- Zanobi Strozzi, Adimari Book of Hours, Renaissance Florence 1448, Walters Art Museum, Baltimore (W767124R)

=== Paintings ===
- Agony in the Garden as part of an 13th-century altarpiece with eight scenes from the Life of Christ, Alana collection, Delaware
- The Agony in the Garden, left panel of a Gothic winged altarpiece with Scenes from the Passion of Christ by Andrea Vanni, 1380s, National Gallery of Art, Washington
- Agony in the Garden by Sassetta of the Sienese school, 1437–44, Detroit Institute of Arts
- Agony in the Garden by Italian Renaissance artist Andrea Mantegna, 1455–1456, National Gallery, London
- Agony in the Garden, an Early Netherlandish painting by Gerard David (formerly attributed to Adriaen Isenbrandt), c. 1510s, Musée des Beaux-Arts de Strasbourg
- Agony in the Garden by High Renaissance artist Correggio, 1524, Apsley House, London
- Christ on the Mount of Olives by Baroque painter Caravaggio, c. 1605, destroyed, formerly Gemäldegalerie, Berlin
- The Agony of Christ in the Garden of Gethsemane by Flemish Jacob Jordaens, c. 1608–40, private collection (Netherlands)
- Agony in the Garden, a painting by romantic poet and artist William Blake, c. 1800, Tate Britain, London
- Christ on the Mount of Olives by Paul Gauguin, 1889, Norton Museum of Art, West Palm Beach, Florida
- Christ in the Garden of Gethsemane Arkhyp Kuindzhi, 1901
The Agony in the Garden in illuminated manuscripts

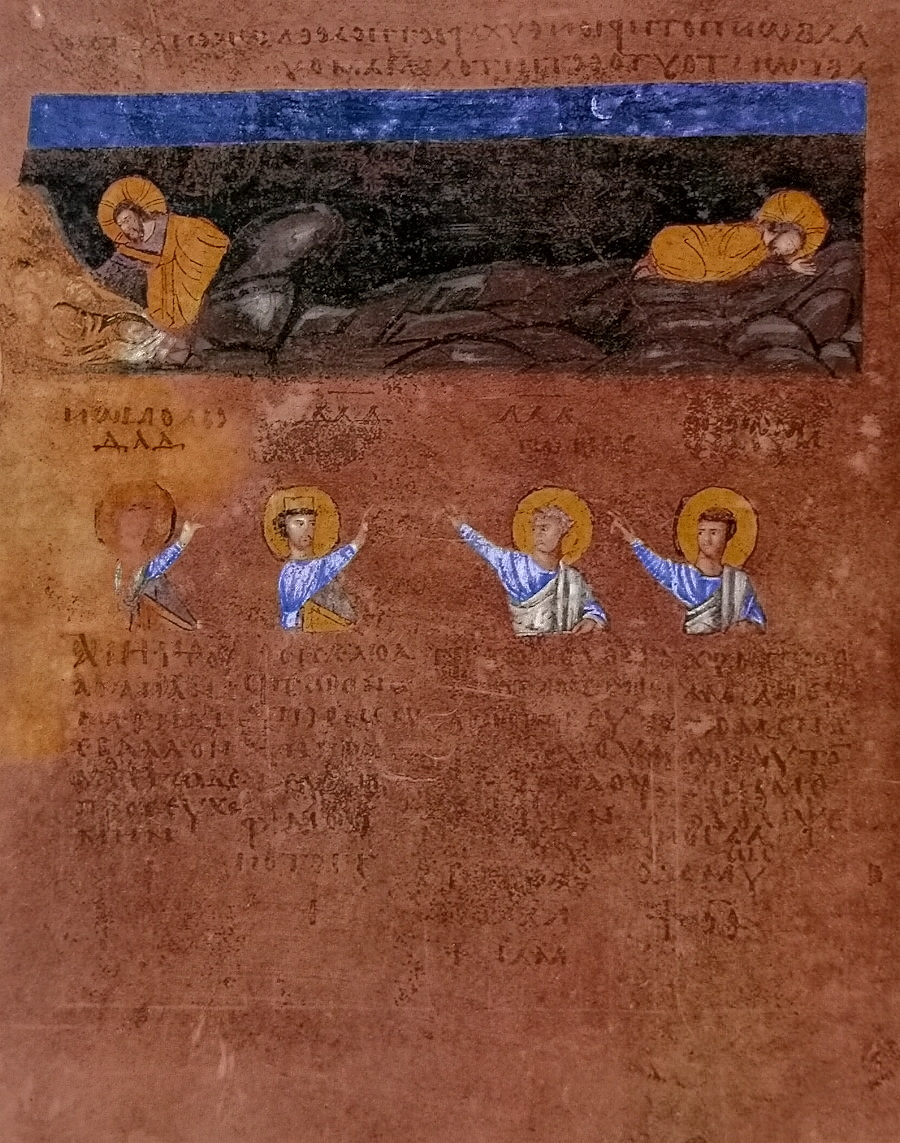
Rossano Gospels, 6th ct.

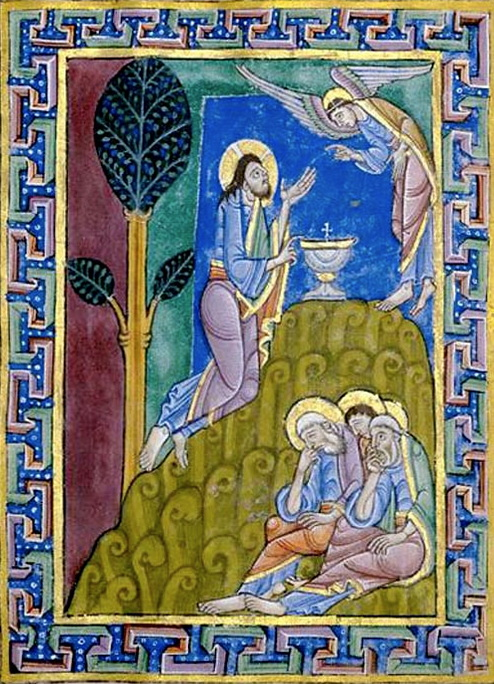
St. Albans Psalter, English, c. 1130, Hildesheim cathedral library

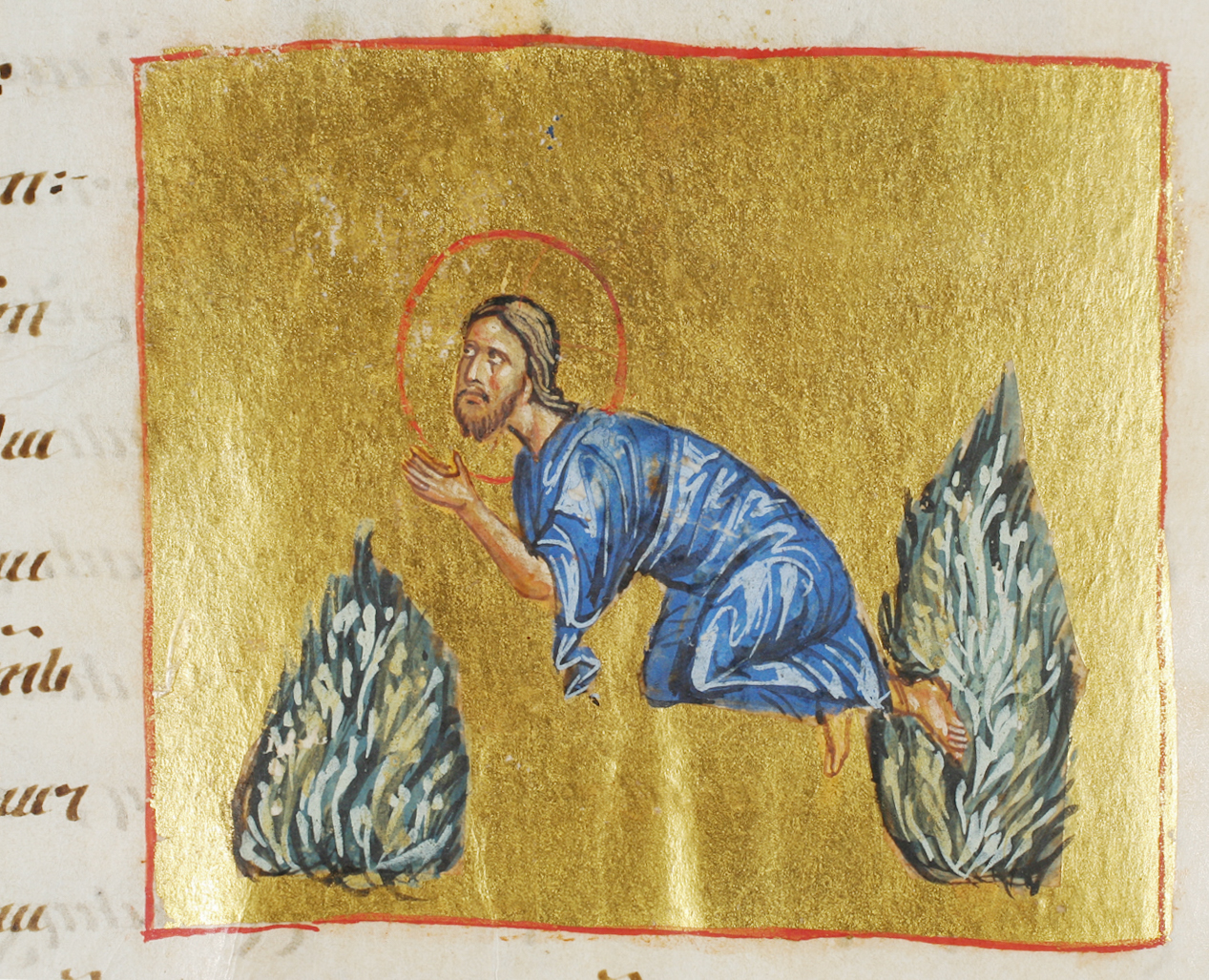
Book of Gelati, Georgian, 12th ct.

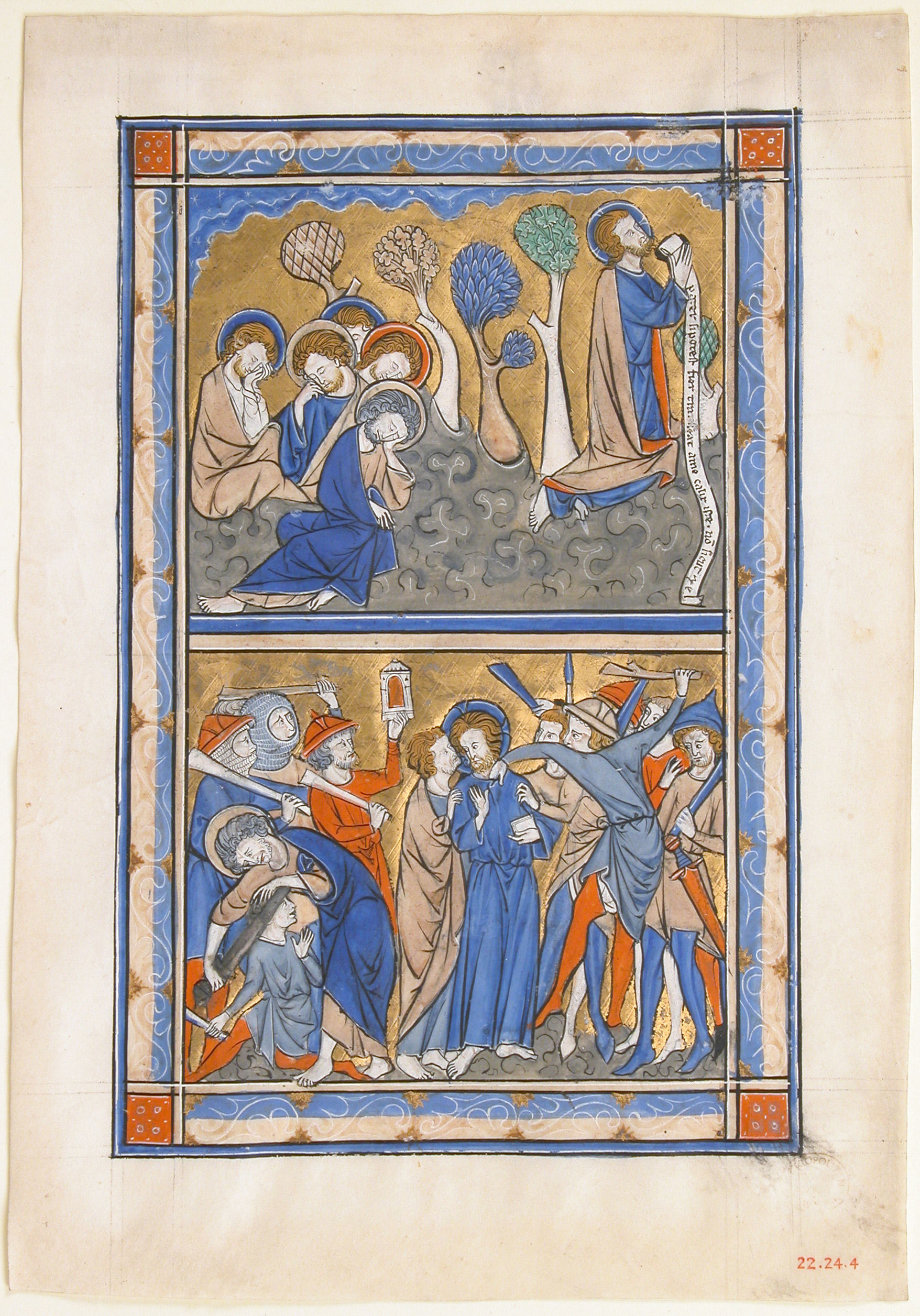
British, c. 1270

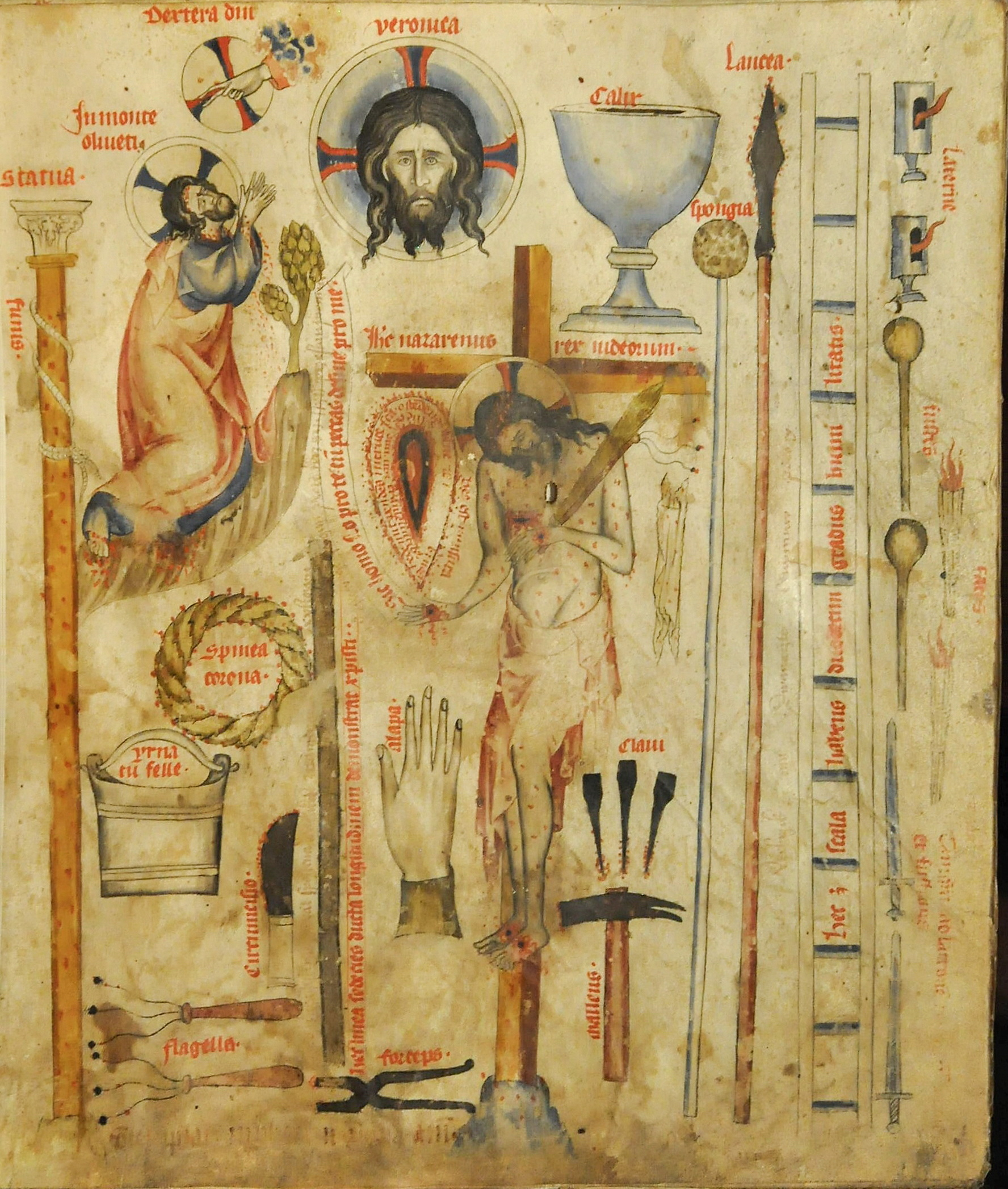
Passional of Abbess Kunigunde, 1312–21

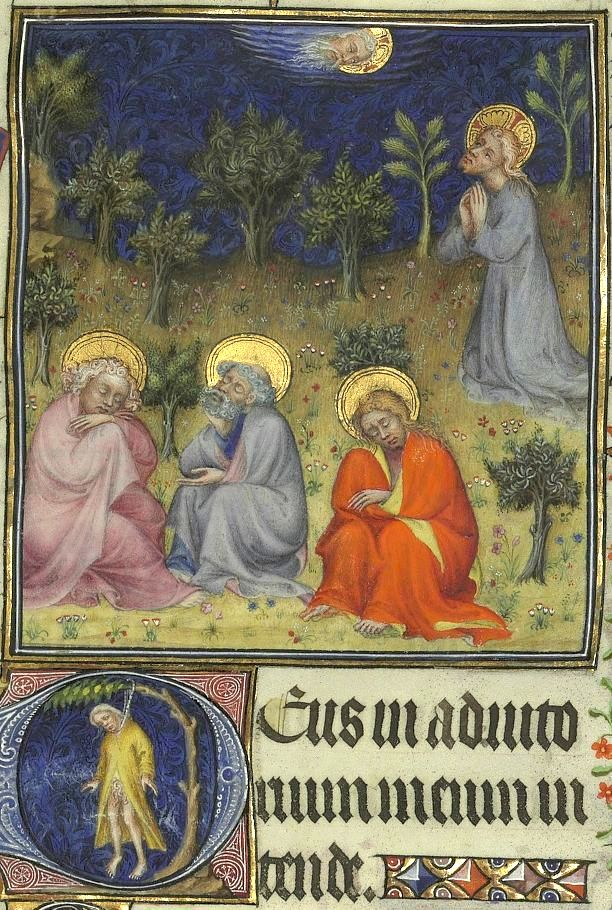
Très Riches Heures du Duc de Berry, 1400–10

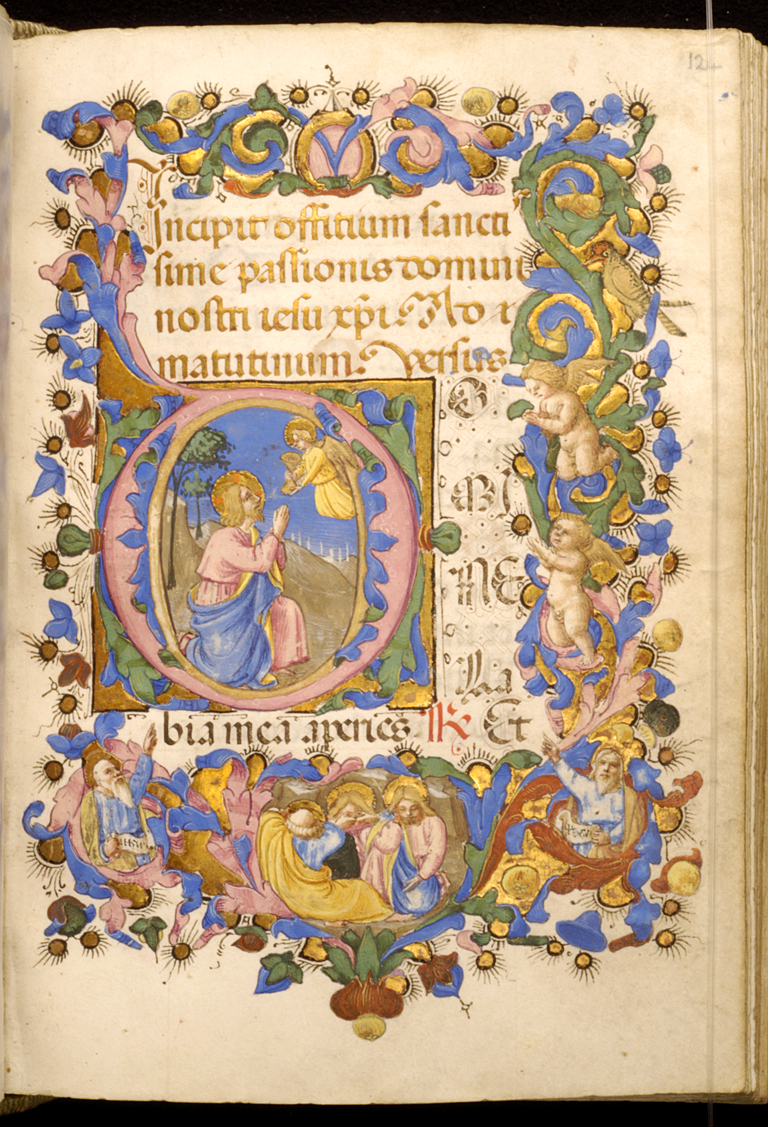
Zanobi Strozzi, Florence, 1448

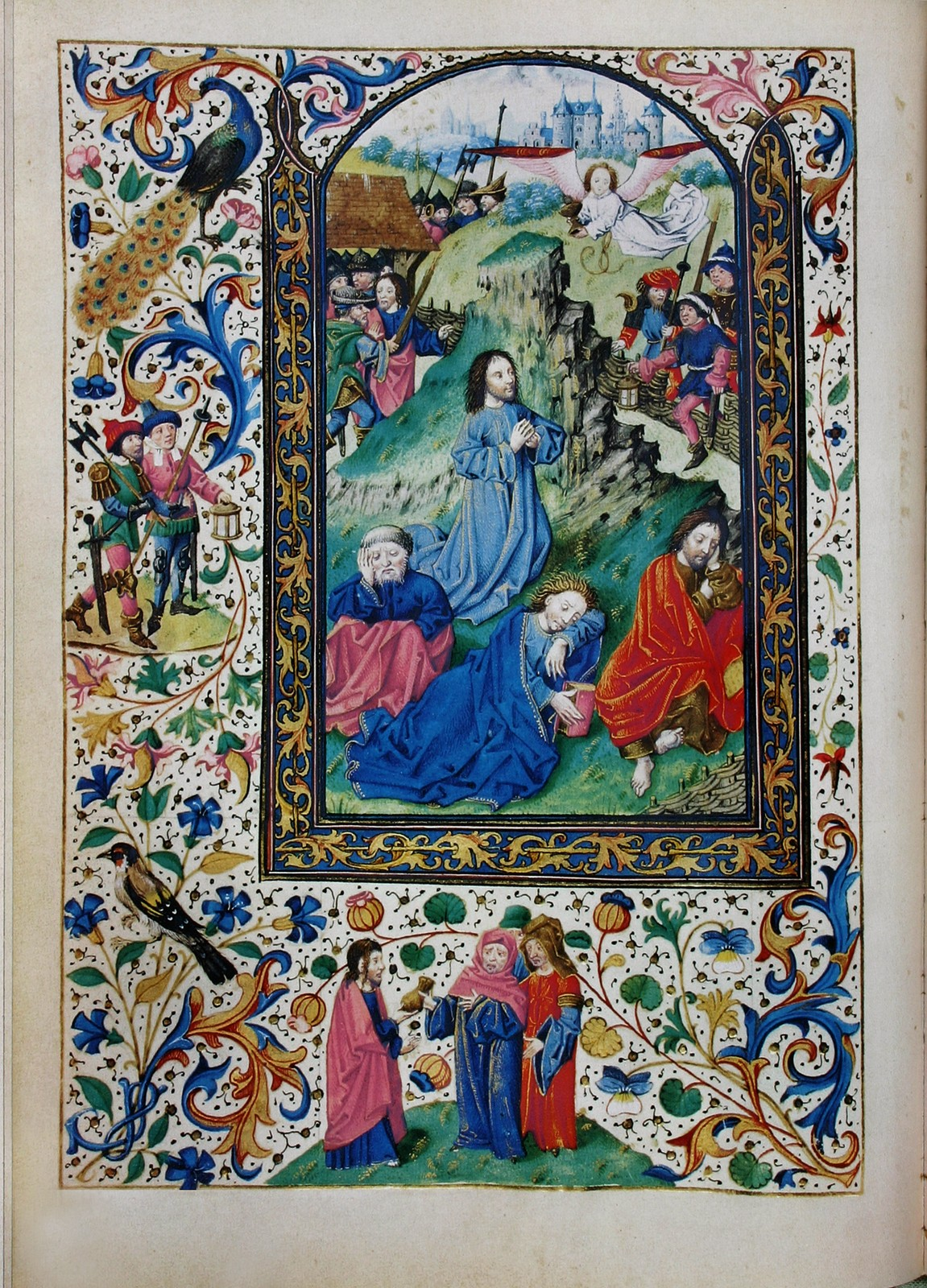
Hours of Mary of Burgundy, 1477
The Agony in the Garden in painting

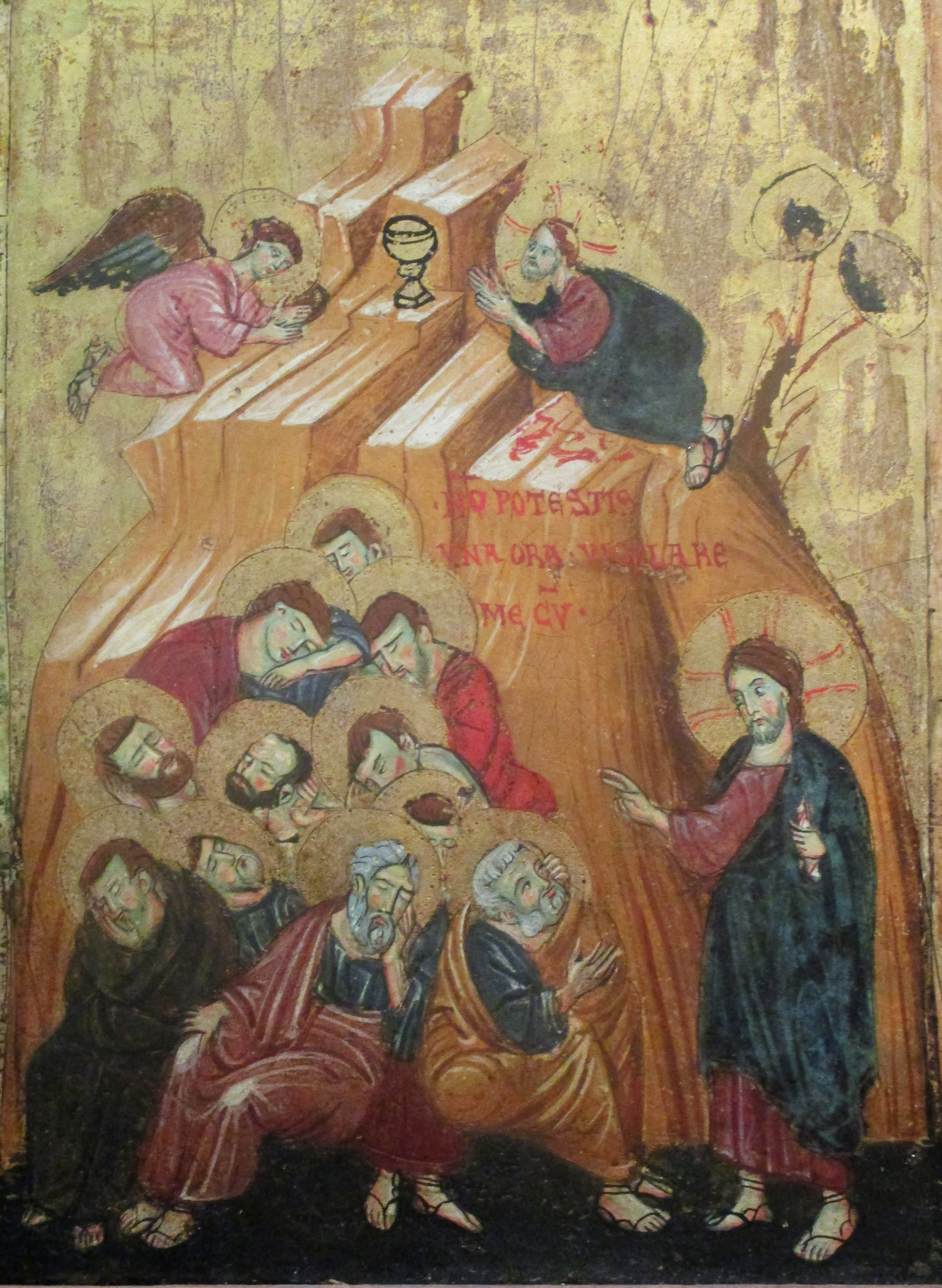
Italian, c. 1250–75

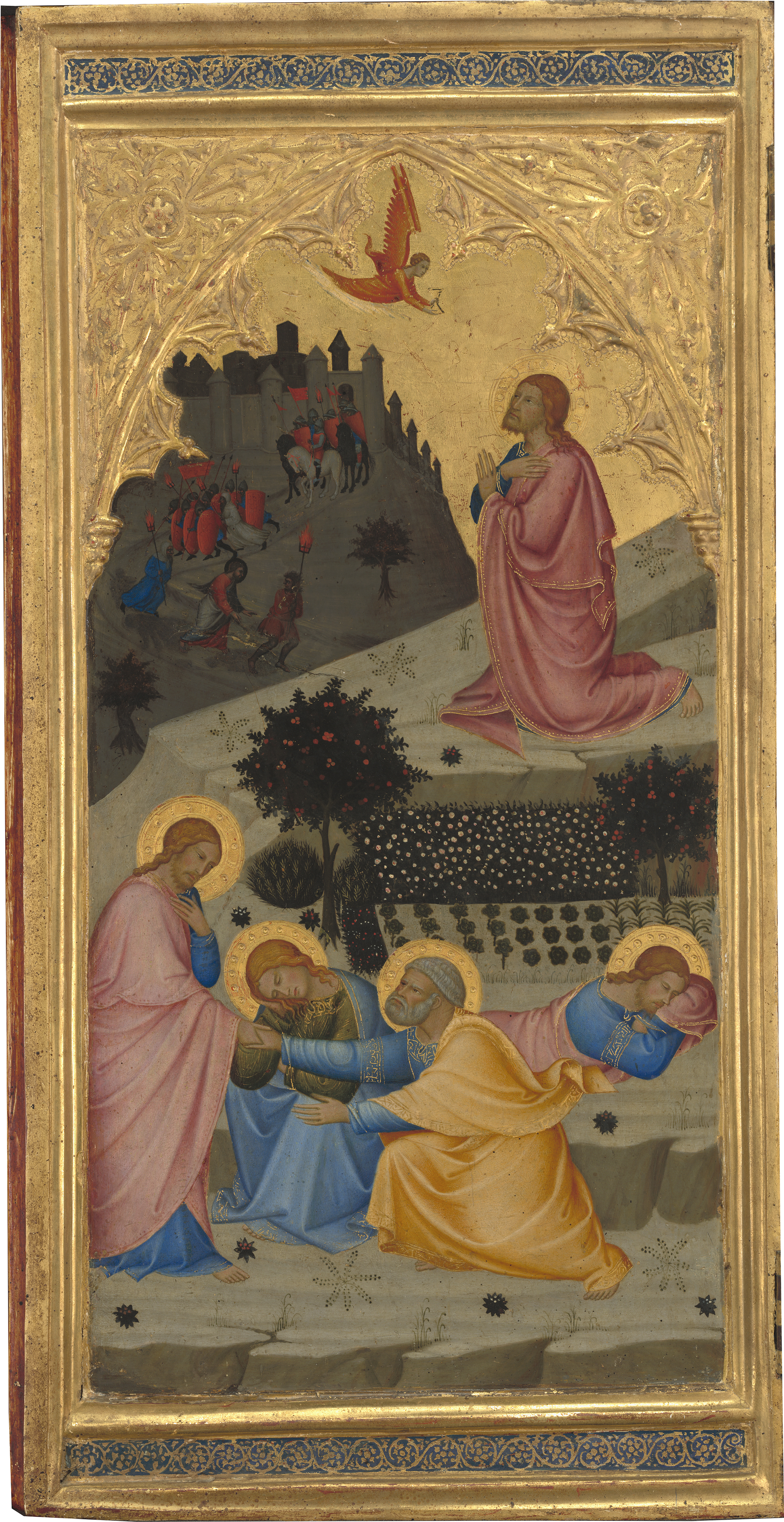
Andrea Vanni, 1380s

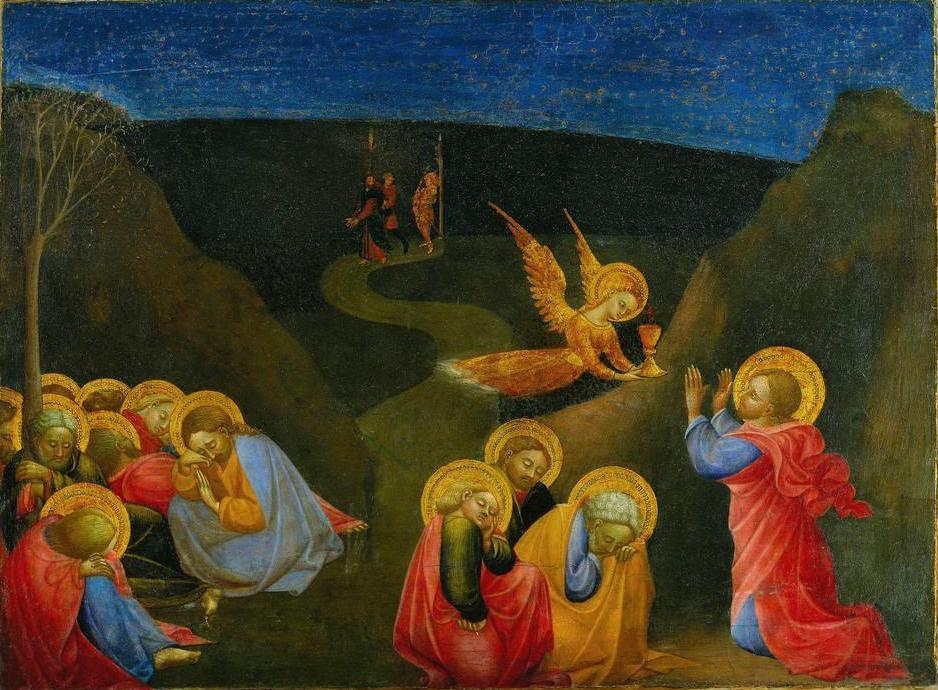
Sassetta, 1437–44

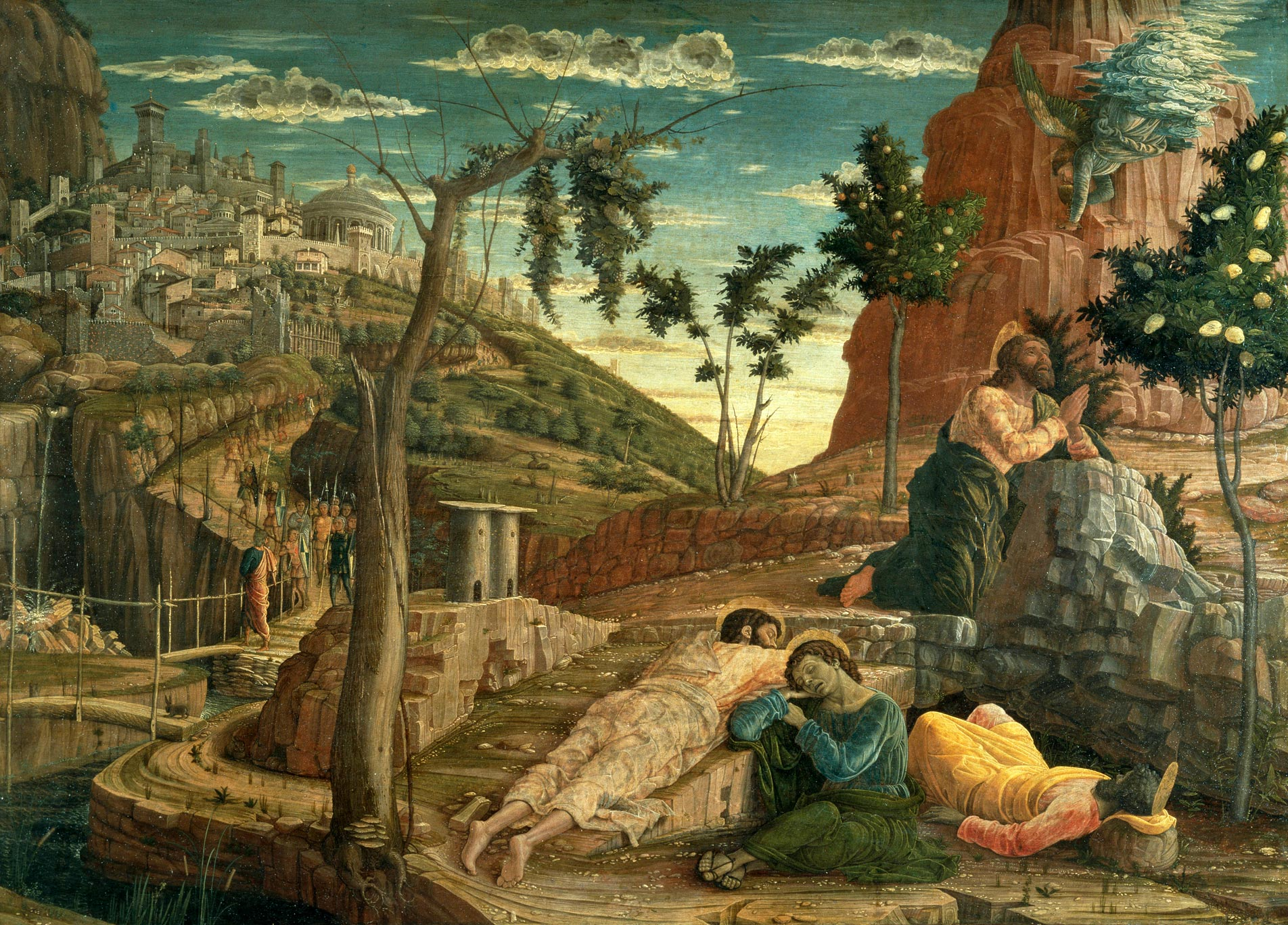
Mantegna, 1457–59

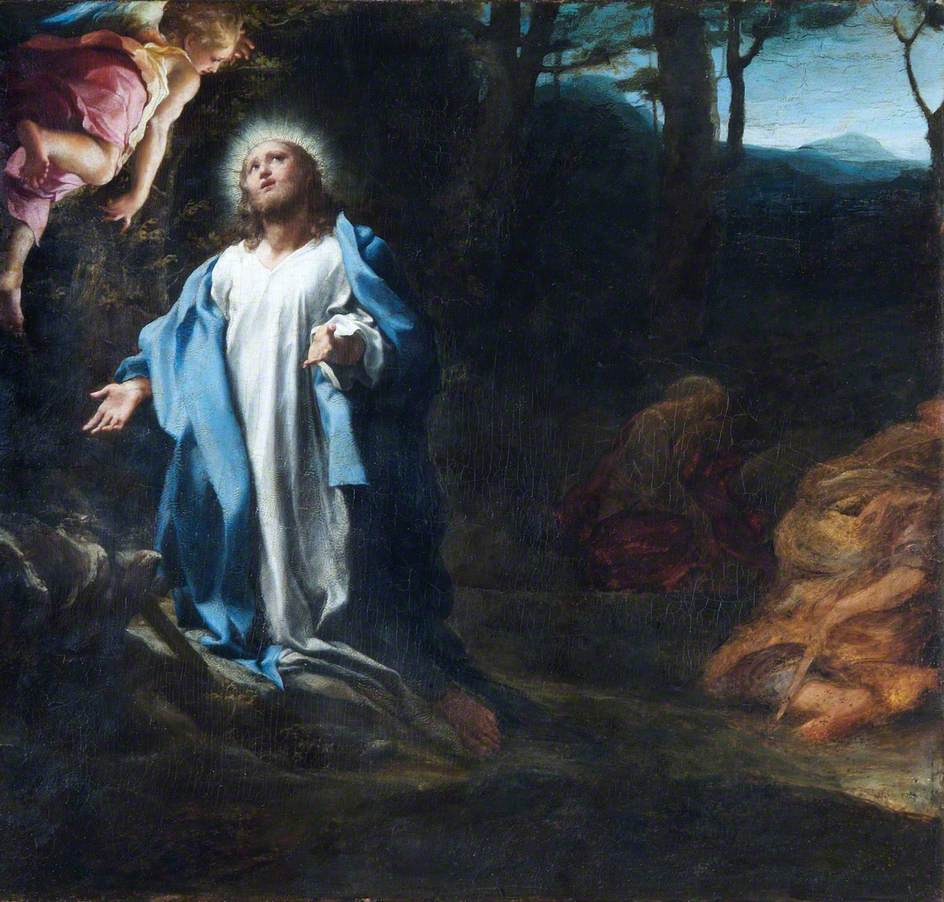
Corregio, 1524

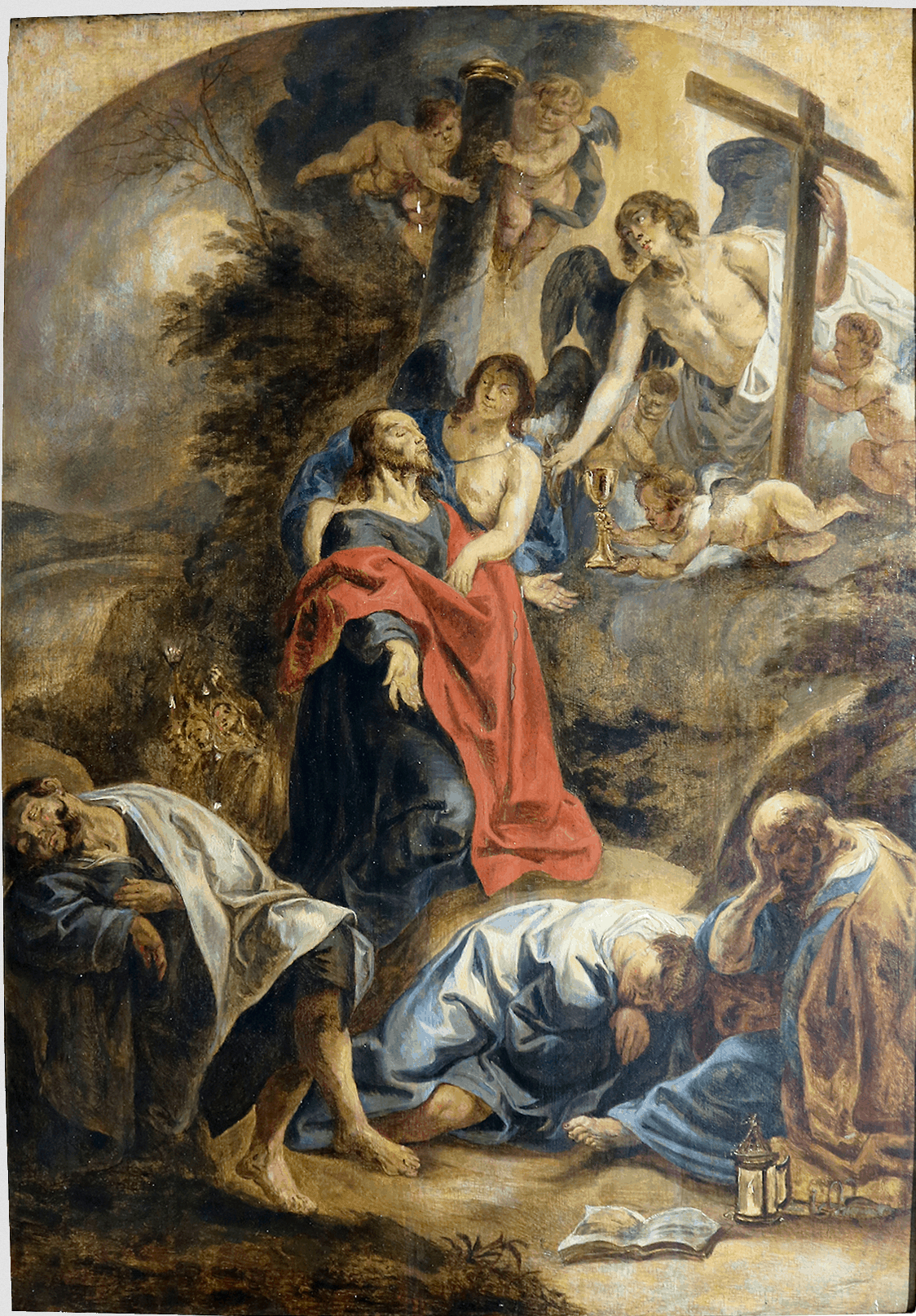
Jacob Jordaens, c. 1608–40

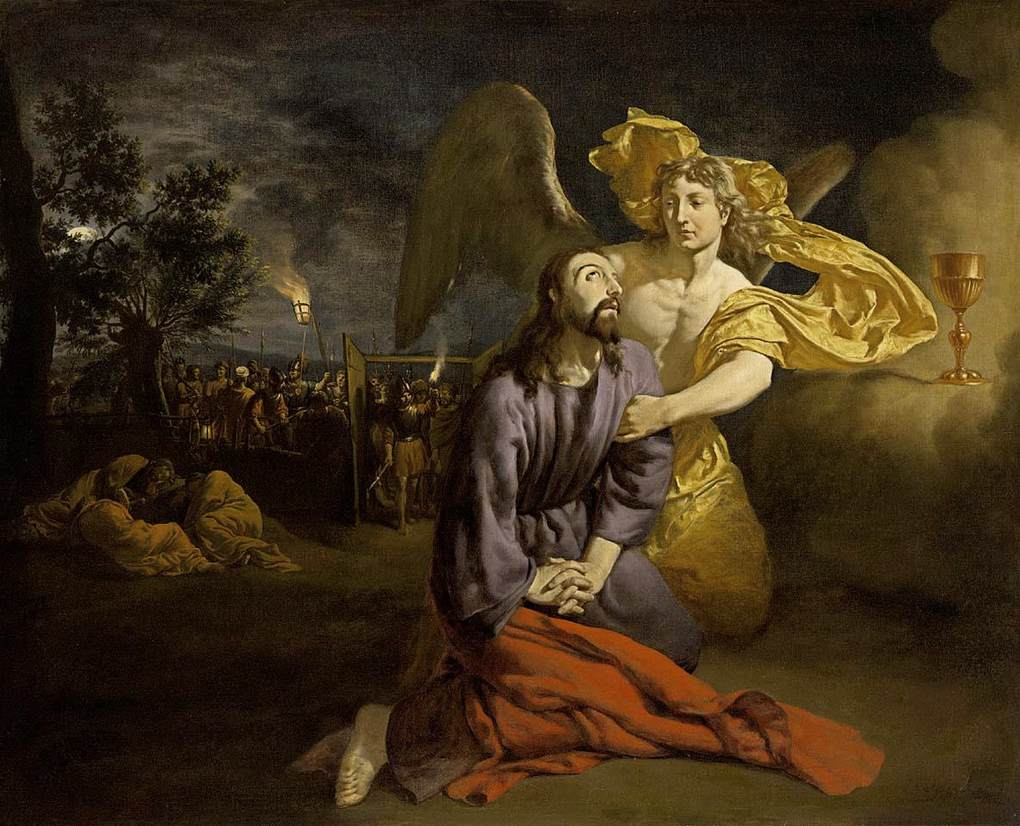
Adriaen van de Velde, 1665

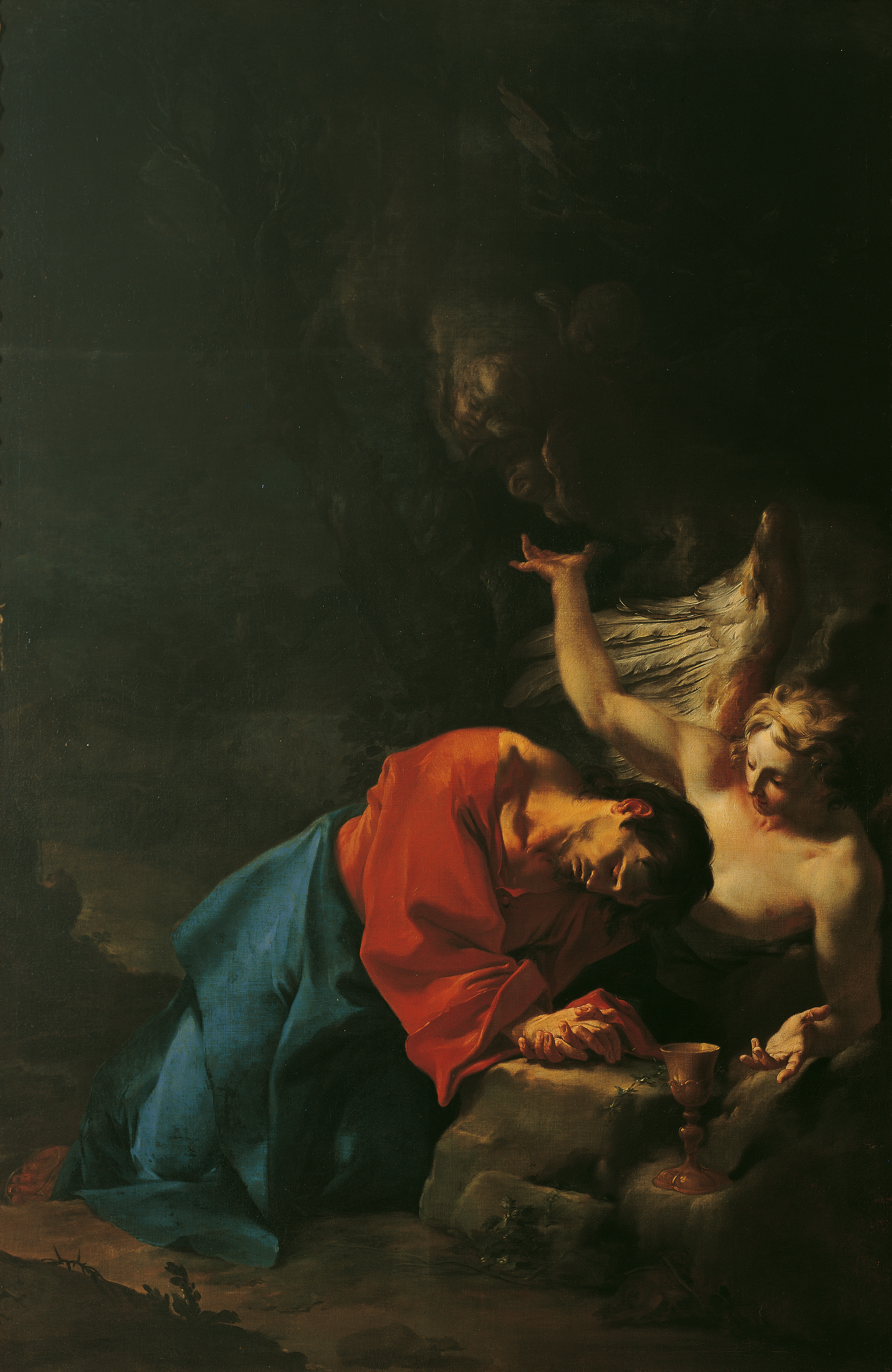
Paul Troger, c. 1750

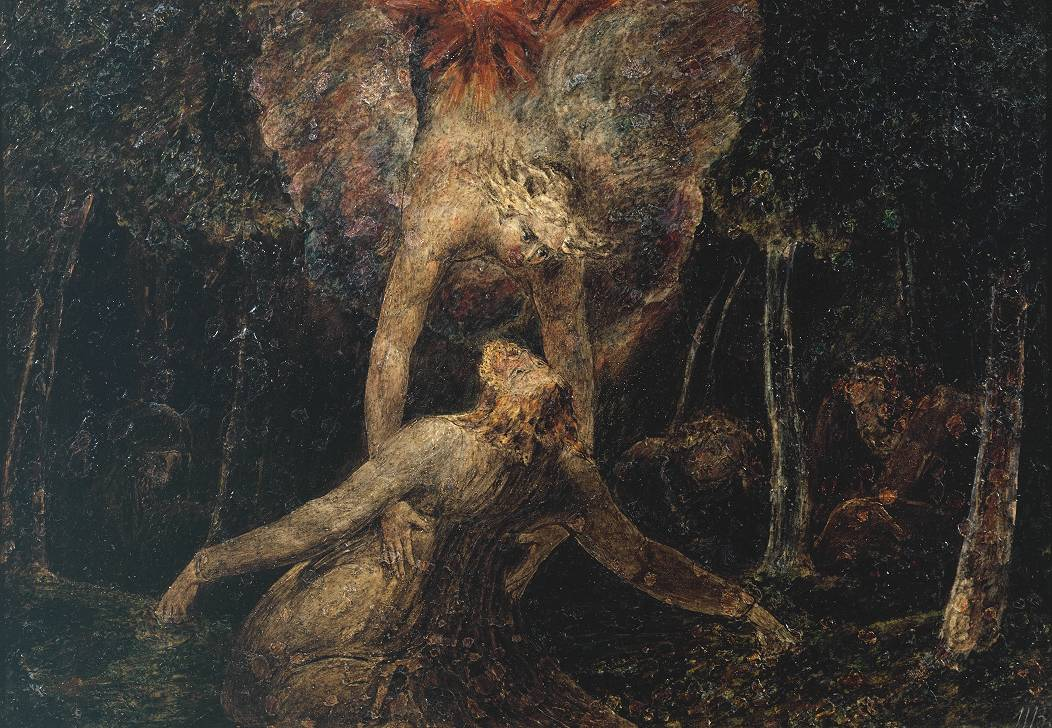
William Blake, 1800

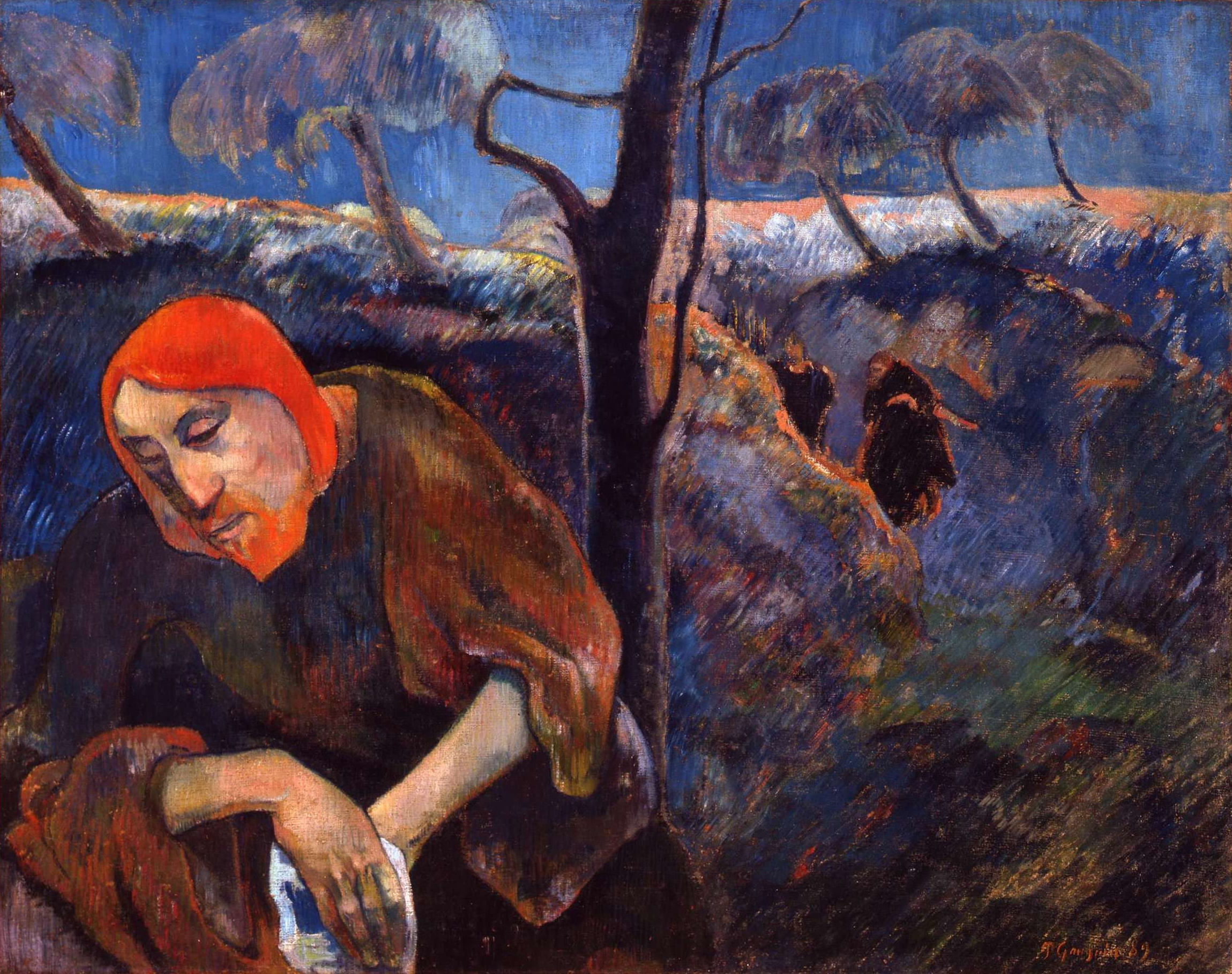
Paul Gauguin, 1889

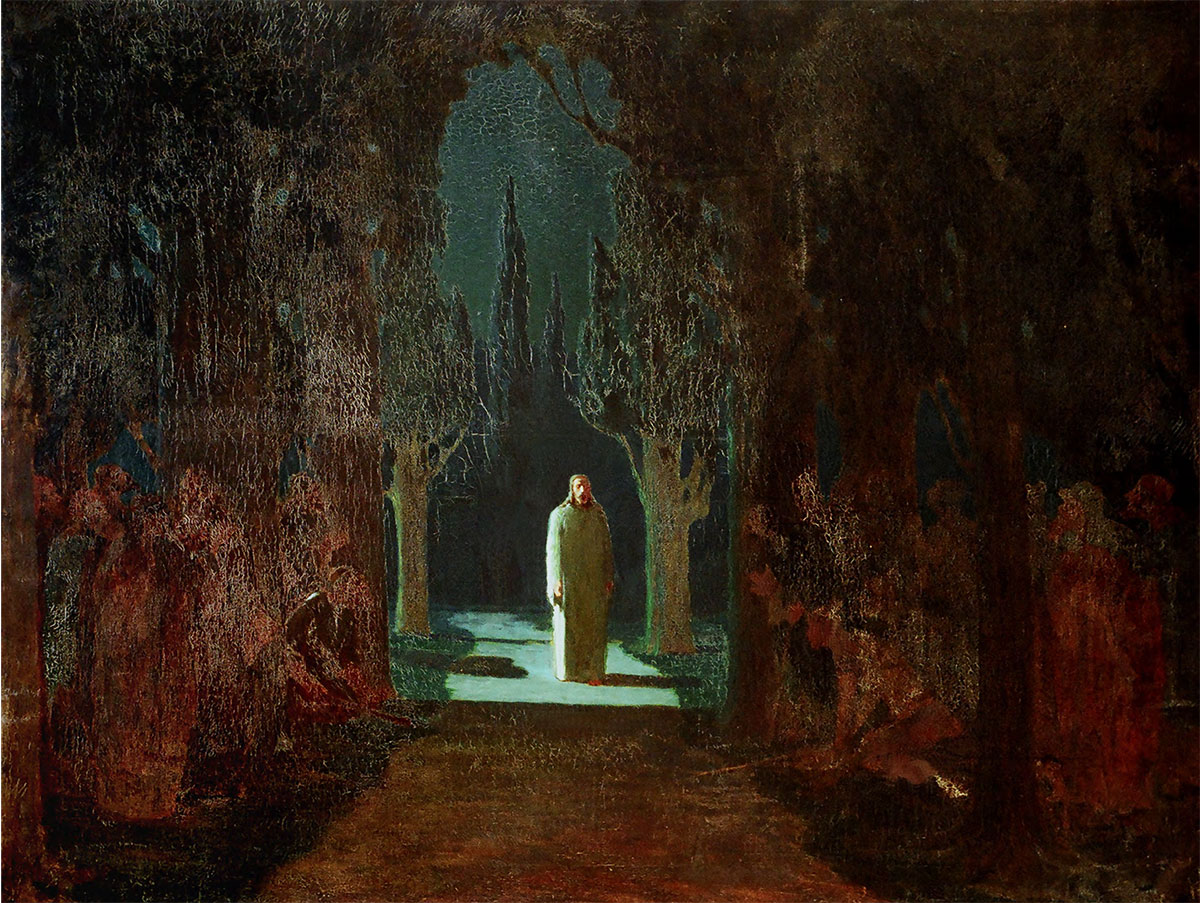
Arkhyp Kuindzhi, 1901

=== In music ===
- Christ on the Mount of Olives – an oratorio by classical composer Ludwig van Beethoven
- "Gethsemane (I Only Want to Say)" – In the rock opera Jesus Christ Superstar by Tim Rice and Andrew Lloyd Webber, Jesus sings this song in which he confronts God about his coming fate, ultimately accepting it by the end of the song. An orchestral reprise is heard after the crucifixion in the form of "John Nineteen: Forty-One".

=== In literature ===
- Alfred de Vigny, "Le Mont des oliviers"
- Gérard de Nerval, "Le Christ au Mont des oliviers"

=== In film ===
- Silence by Masahiro Shinoda (Japan, 1971)
- The Passion of Christ by Mel Gibson (US, 2004)
- Silence by Martin Scorsese (US, 2016), remake of Shinoda's film

== Medical conjectures ==
Some in the medical field have hypothesized that Jesus's great anguish caused him to experience hematidrosis (a medical term for sweating blood).

In the traditional viewpoint (that Luke wrote the Gospel of Luke), it is believed that only Luke described Jesus as sweating blood because Luke was a physician.

== See also ==
- Life of Jesus in the New Testament
