= Scriptural Way of the Cross =

Version of the Christian devotion 'the Stations of the Cross'

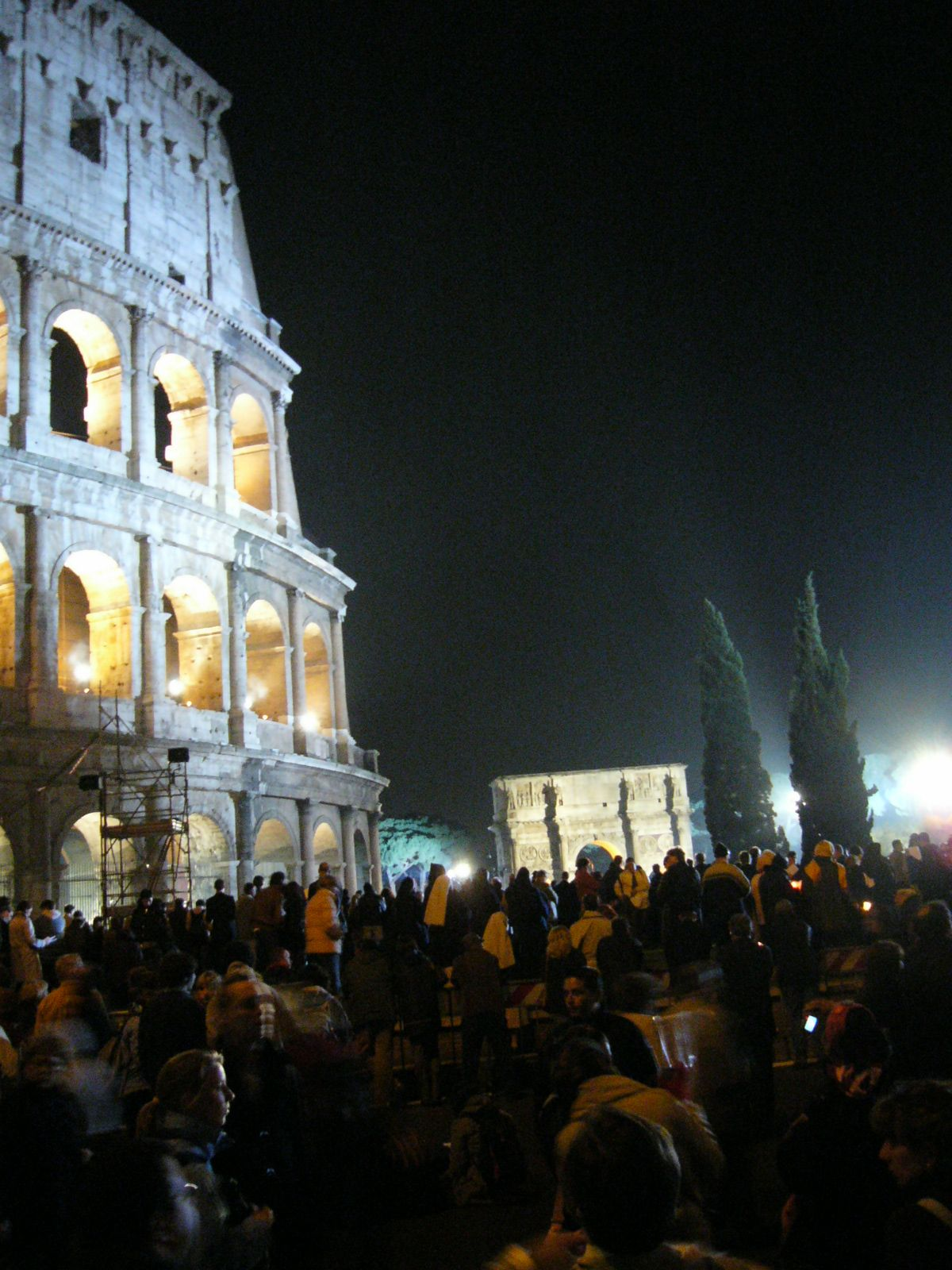
The Way of the Cross, celebrated at the Colosseum in Rome on Good Friday.

The Scriptural Way of the Cross or Scriptural Stations of the Cross is a modern version of the ancient Christian, especially Catholic, devotion called the Stations of the Cross. This version was inaugurated on Good Friday 1991 by Pope John Paul II. The Scriptural version was not intended to invalidate the traditional version. Rather it was meant to add nuance to an understanding of the Passion.

== History ==
Out of the fourteen traditional Stations of the Cross, only eight have clear scriptural foundation. To provide a version of this devotion more closely aligned with the biblical accounts, Pope John Paul II introduced a new form of the devotion, called the Scriptural Way of the Cross, on Good Friday 1991. He celebrated that form many times, often but not exclusively at the Colosseum in Rome on Good Friday.

In 2007 Pope Benedict XVI approved this set of stations for meditation and public celebration.

== The text of the Stations ==
Before each station (all genuflect while reciting):

Minister: We adore you, O Christ, and we praise you. All: Because by your holy cross you have redeemed the world.

=== First station: Jesus in the Garden of Gethsemane ===
Then Jesus came with them to a place called Gethsemane, and he said to his disciples, "Sit here while I go over there and pray." He took along Peter and the two sons of Zebedee, and began to feel sorrow and distress. Then he said to them, "My soul is sorrowful even to death. Remain here and keep watch with me." He advanced a little and fell prostrate in prayer, saying, "My Father, if it is possible, let this cup pass from me; yet, not as I will, but as you will." When he returned to his disciples he found them asleep. He said to Peter, "So you could not keep watch with me for one hour? Watch and pray that you may not undergo the test. The spirit is willing, but the flesh is weak." Matthew 26:36-41

=== Second station: Jesus is betrayed by Judas and arrested ===
While Jesus was still speaking, Judas, one of the Twelve, arrived, accompanied by a crowd with swords and clubs, who had come from the chief priests, the scribes, and the elders. His betrayer had arranged a signal with them, saying, "the man I shall kiss is the one; arrest him and lead him away securely." He came and immediately went over to him and said, "Rabbi." And he kissed him. At this they laid hands on him and arrested him. Mark 14: 43-46

=== Third station: Jesus is condemned by the Sanhedrin ===
When day came the council of elders of the people met, both chief priests and scribes, and they brought him before their Sanhedrin. They said, "If you are the Messiah, tell us," but he replied to them, "If I tell you, you will not believe, and if I question, you will not respond. But from this time on the Son of Man will be seated at the right hand of the power of God." They all asked, "Are you then the Son of God?" He replied to them, "You say that I am." Then they said, "What further need have we for testimony? We have heard it from his own mouth." Luke 22: 66-71

=== Fourth station: Jesus is denied by Peter ===
Now Peter was sitting outside in the courtyard. One of the maids came over to him and said, "You too were with Jesus the Galilean." But Peter denied in front of everyone, saying, "I do not know what you are talking about!" As he went out to the gate, another girl saw him and said to those who were there, "This man was with Jesus the Nazorean." Again he denied it with an oath, "I do not know the man!" A little later the bystanders came over and said to Peter, "Surely you too are one of them; even your speech gives you away." At that he began to curse and to swear, "I do not know the man." And immediately a cock crowed. Then Peter remembered the word that Jesus had spoken: "Before the cock crows you will deny me three times." He went out and began to weep bitterly. Matthew 26: 69-75

=== Fifth station: Jesus is judged by Pontius Pilate ===
The chief priests with the elders and the scribes, that is, the whole Sanhedrin, held a council. They bound Jesus, led him away, and handed him over to Pontius Pilate. Pilate questioned him, "Are you the king of the Jews?" He said to him in reply, "You say so." The chief priests accused him of many things. Again Pilate questioned him, "Have you no answer? See how many things they accuse you of." Jesus gave him no further answer, so that Pilate was amazed.... Pilate, wishing to satisfy the crowd, released Barabbas and handed Jesus over to be crucified. Mark 15: 1-5, 15

=== Sixth station: Jesus is scourged at the pillar and crowned with thorns ===
Then Pilate took Jesus and had him scourged. And the soldiers wove a crown of thorns and placed it on his head, and clothed him in a purple cloak, and they came to him and said,"Hail, King of the Jews!" And they struck him repeatedly. John 19: 1-3

=== Seventh station: Jesus bears the cross ===
When the chief priests and the guards saw [Jesus] they cried out, "Crucify him, crucify him!" Pilate said to them, "Take him yourselves and crucify him. I find no guilt in him." ... They cried out, "Take him away, take him away! Crucify him!" Pilate said to them, "Shall I crucify your king?" The chief priests answered, "We have no king but Caesar." Then he handed him over to them to be crucified. So they took Jesus, and carrying the cross himself he went out to what is called the Place of the Skull, in Hebrew, Golgotha. John 19: 6, 15-17

=== Eighth station: Jesus is helped by Simon the Cyrenian to carry the cross ===
They pressed into service a passer-by, Simon of Cyrene, who was coming in from the country, the father of Alexander and Rufus, to carry his cross. Mark 15: 21

=== Ninth station: Jesus meets the women of Jerusalem ===
A large crowd of people followed Jesus, including many women who mourned and lamented him. Jesus turned to them and said, "Daughters of Jerusalem, do not weep for me; weep instead for yourselves and for your children, for indeed, the days are coming when people will say, ‘Blessed are the barren, the wombs that never bore and the breasts that never nursed.' At that time, people will say to the mountains, ‘Fall upon us!' and to the hills, ‘Cover us!' for if these things are done when the wood is green what will happen when it is dry?" Luke 23: 27-31

=== Tenth station: Jesus is crucified ===
When they came to the place called the Skull, they crucified him and the criminals there, one on his right, the other on his left. [Then Jesus said, "Father, forgive them, they know not what they do."] Luke 23: 33-34

=== Eleventh station: Jesus promises his Kingdom to the repentant thief ===
Now one of the criminals hanging there reviled Jesus, saying, "Are you not the Messiah? Save yourself and us." The other, the "repentant thief", however, rebuking him, said in reply, "Have you no fear of God, for you are subject to the same condemnation? And indeed, we have been condemned justly, for the sentence we received corresponds to our crimes, but this man has done nothing criminal." Then he said, "Jesus, remember me when you come into your kingdom." He replied to him, "Amen, I say to you, today you will be with me in Paradise." Luke 23: 39-43

=== Twelfth station: Jesus speaks to his mother and the Beloved Disciple ===
Standing by the cross of Jesus were his mother Mary, and his mother's sister, Mary the wife of Clopas, and Mary of Magdala. When Jesus saw his mother and the Beloved Disciple, he said to his mother, "Woman, behold, your son." Then he said to the disciple, "Behold, your mother." And from that hour the disciple took her into his home. John 19: 25-27

=== Thirteenth station: Jesus dies on the cross ===
(It is optional but appropriate to remain kneeling while in this station)

It was now about noon and darkness came over the whole land until three in the afternoon because of an eclipse of the sun. Then the veil of the temple was torn down the middle. Jesus cried out in a loud voice, "Father, into your hands I commend my spirit"; and when he had said this he breathed his last. Luke 23: 44-46

=== Fourteenth station: Jesus is placed in the tomb ===
When it was evening, there came a rich man from Arimathea named Joseph, who was himself a disciple of Jesus. He went to Pilate and asked for the body of Jesus; then Pilate ordered it to be handed over. Taking the body, Joseph wrapped it [in] clean linen and laid it in his new tomb that he had hewn in the rock. Then he rolled a huge stone across the entrance to the tomb and departed. Matthew 27: 57-60

=== Optional fifteenth station ===
Many churches have long added the resurrection as a fifteenth station, and in 2000 John Paul II gave his approval. This is in line with the centrality of the resurrection in the Church's liturgy, and with the teaching of Second Vatican Council that "devotions should be so drawn up that they harmonise with the liturgical seasons, accord with the sacred liturgy, are in some fashion derived from it, and lead the people to it, since, in fact, the liturgy by its very nature far surpasses any of them."

== Other innovations ==
The Catholic Church in the Philippines uses a slightly different set called the New Way of the Cross. It starts with the Last Supper and ends with the Resurrection of Jesus. It was adopted as early as 1992. It is used only in dioceses within the Philippines and among Overseas Filipino ethnic parishes and ecclesial communities.

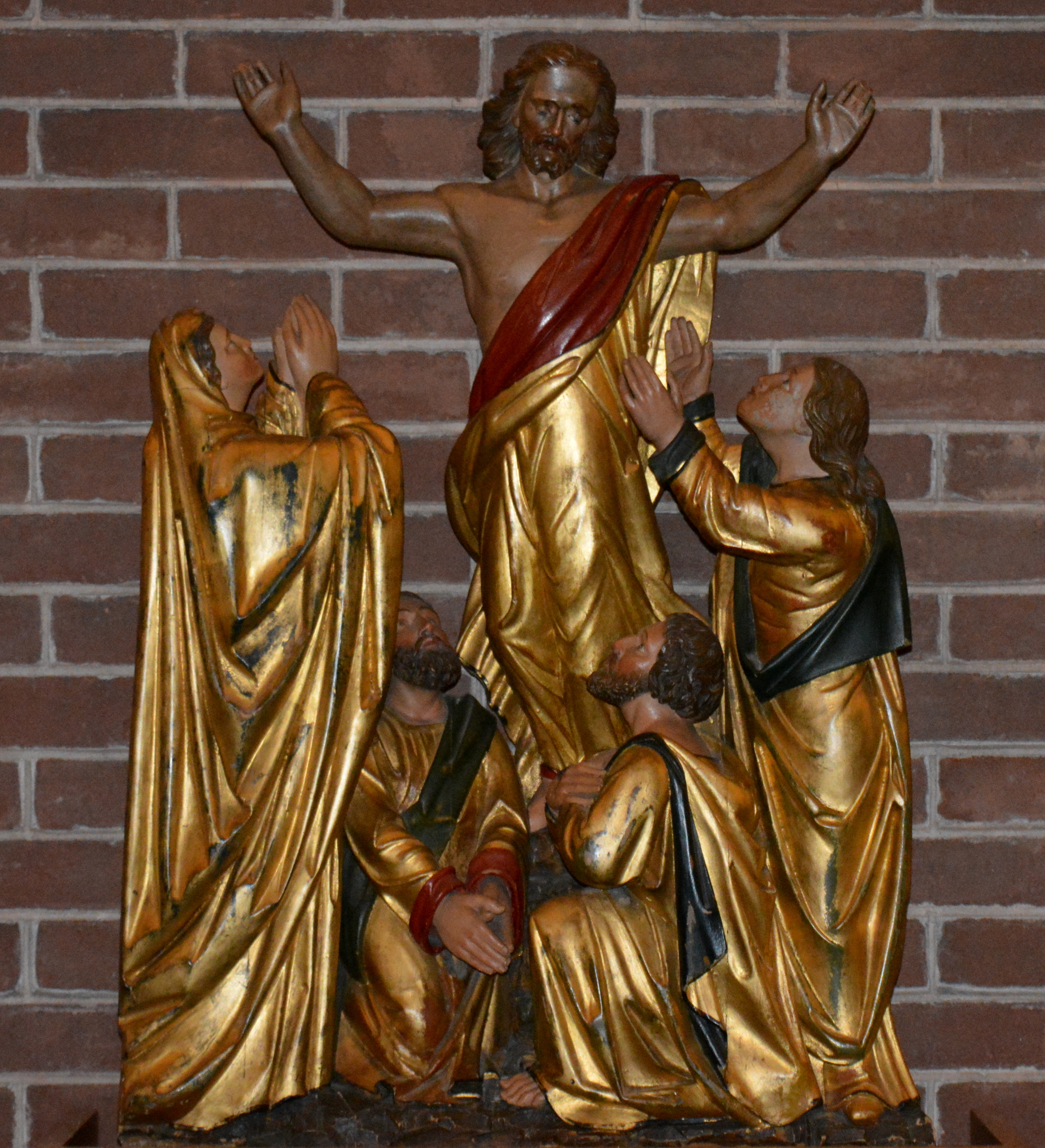
Fifteenth station

1. The Last Supper
2. The agony in Gethsemani
3. Jesus before the Sanhedrin
4. The scourging and crowning with thorns
5. Jesus receives the cross
6. Jesus falls under the weight of the cross
7. Simon of Cyrene carries the cross of Jesus
8. Jesus meets the pious women of Jerusalem
9. Jesus is stripped and nailed to the cross
10. The repentant thief
11. Mary and John at the foot of the cross
12. Jesus dies on the cross
13. Jesus is laid in the tomb
14. Jesus rises from death
