= Agony in the Garden (Blake) =

Painting by William Blake

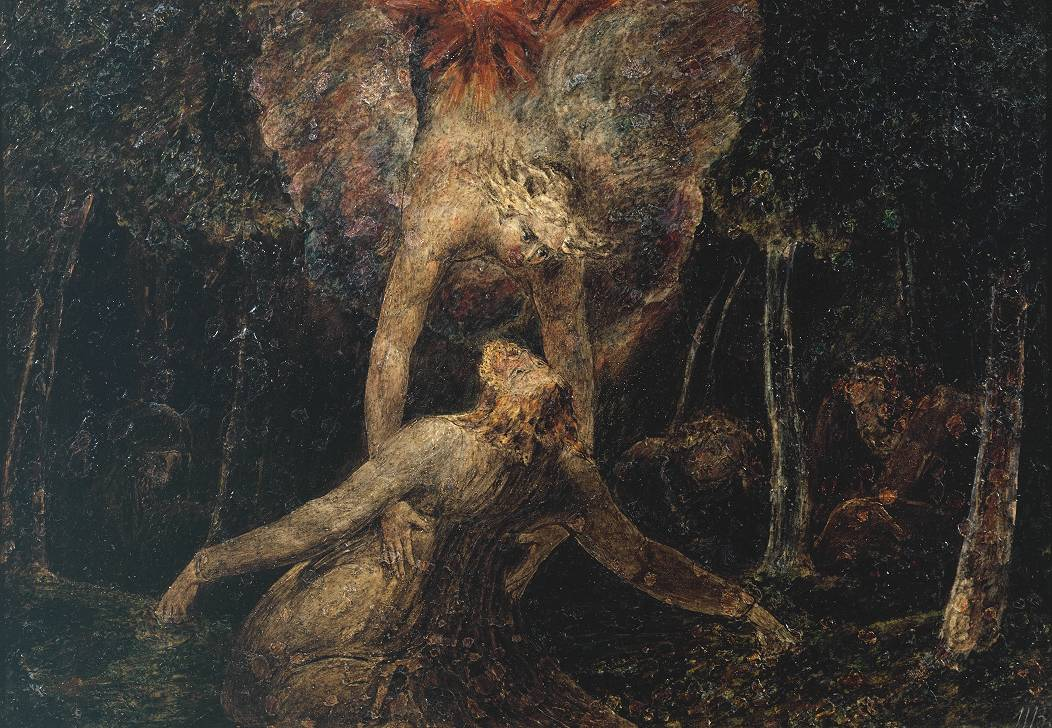
The Agony in the Garden, 1799–1800. Tempera on tinned iron, 27 cm × 38 cm

The Agony in the Garden is a small painting by William Blake, completed as part of his 1799–1800 series of Bible illustrations commissioned by his patron and friend Thomas Butts. The work illustrates a passage from the Gospel of Luke which describes Christ's turmoil in the Garden of Gethsemane before his arrest and Crucifixion following Judas's betrayal. In Blake's painting a brilliantly coloured and majestic angel breaks through the surrounding darkness and descends from a cloud to aid and physically support Jesus in his hour of agony. The work is dominated by vertical lines, formed both from the trees and from the two arms of the angel. Two inner lines converge on Christ's palms, evoking the nails driven through him during his crucifixion.

The Agony in the Garden was bequeathed by Blake collector Graham Robertson to the National Trust in 1948. It was acquired by the Tate Gallery the following year.

== Description ==
Between 1799 and 1803, Blake produced over 150 biblical illustrations for Thomas Butts. Around 50 were complete for the 1799–1880 series, of which around 30 are extant. They are all around the same size; all but two are significantly larger than the average 28 cm x 38 cm. Only the present work is on tinned steel; the majority of the others are painted on canvas. The works, all minutely detailed and richly coloured, involve complex and innovative arrangement and design.

The text accompanying The Agony in the Garden reads: "And there appeared an angel unto him from heaven, strengthening him. And being in an agony he prayed more earnestly, and his sweat was as it were great drops of blood falling down to the ground." The painting shows Christ kneeling in the garden with his arms outstretched and leaning backwards as if about to faint. He is held at the waist by an angel descending from a multi-coloured cloud. The angel supports Christ as he leans back, crying out in agony. Both the angel and cloud are composed by a dominant impasted white, and lined with brilliant varieties of red, blue, yellow and green pigments. Three vaguely described, almost ghostly, disciples kneel in the dark trees to either side.

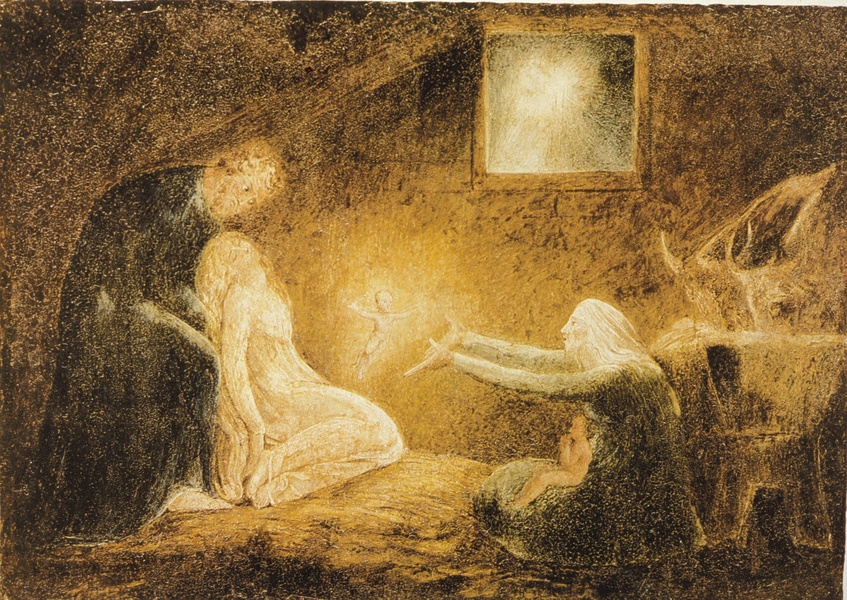
Nativity, 1790–1800. Tempera on copper. Philadelphia Museum of Art.

Art historian Anthony Blunt linked this work to Blake's Nativity and Procession to Calvary, and contended that they provide insight to Blake's mindset at the time. The artist had earlier been preoccupied with the nature of evil and the duality of human nature, but seemingly emerged and found hope through the ideal of salvation through Christ. According to Blunt, Blake conveys this through the motif of a bright light shining into the darkness of mankind. In the present work this is perhaps expressed through the angel appearing in brilliantly illuminated colours from the darkness and foreboding of the trees.

The work is built up from a number of layers of paint above the underlying priming. In some cases the layers are separated by films of binding glue. The foreground is built from a chalk ground above the priming, which gives added texture, and is especially evident around the areas of the trees and scrubs.

== Material ==
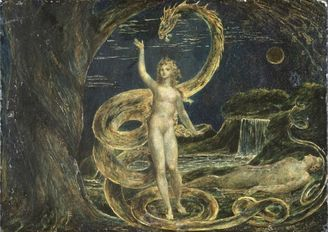
Eve Tempted by the Serpent. Tempera on Copper. Another work from the series painted on metal, in this case copperplate.

The painting is unique in Blake's oeuvre in that the tempera is painted on tinned iron. Most of the works in the series were painted onto canvas, with three on copper and only the present work on tinned iron. It has been suggested that this plate may originally have formed the lid of a box, possibly a paint box. The work is further unique in that he employed cherry gum in his mixture, utilising a blend more commonly associated with earlier, medieval illuminated manuscripts, but which delivers a smoother and more durable effect.

In employing tinned iron Blake was likely experimenting with methods of etching or painting on metal, perhaps following the examples of Lucas van Leyden and Albrecht Dürer's work on copperplate. The surface was prepared with oil and lead before the application of the paint, although red lead pigment was applied directly onto the tin around the area of the angel's lower back and waist. Unfortunately this pigment is not well bound to the surface and has suffered damage and loss of paint.

Some areas of colour were retouched by restorers around 1850 following dulling and loss of paint. This is most obvious with the bright greens to either side of Christ. However, the additions are barely noticeable as the restorers employed pigments prepared in a similar matter to the originals.

== Condition ==
The Agony in the Garden is in very poor condition, mainly due to a build-up of material following corrosion of the iron. This material has gathered between the painting's metal surface and priming, resulting in the delamination and displacement of pigment. Blake sealed his metal support with red paint bound with a gum mixture and animal glue, which was at the time thought to be a corrosion inhibitor. However, it offered little protection against the decay of the paint layers, and in fact contributed to the displacement of pigment.

There is a damaged signature "WBinv" in white paint at the lower right, although it is undated.

== Sources ==
- Hamlyn, Robin; Ackroyd, Peter; Phillips, Michael. William Blake. New York : The Metropolitan Museum of Art, 2000. ISBN
- Raine, Kathleen. William Blake. London: Thames and Hudson, 1970. ISBN 0-500-20107-2
- Mulhallen, Karen (ed.). Blake in Our Time: Essays in Honour of G.E. Bentley Jr. Toronto: Toronto University Press, 2010. ISBN 1-4426-4151-7
- Stoner, Joyce Hill. Conservation of Easel Paintings: Principles and Practice. Butterworth-Heinemann, 2012. ISBN 0-7506-8199-3
- Townsend, Joyce (ed.). William Blake: The Painter at Work. London: Tate Publishing, 2003. ISBN 1-85437-468-0
