= Self-Portrait (Giovanni Bellini) =

Painting by Giovanni Bellini

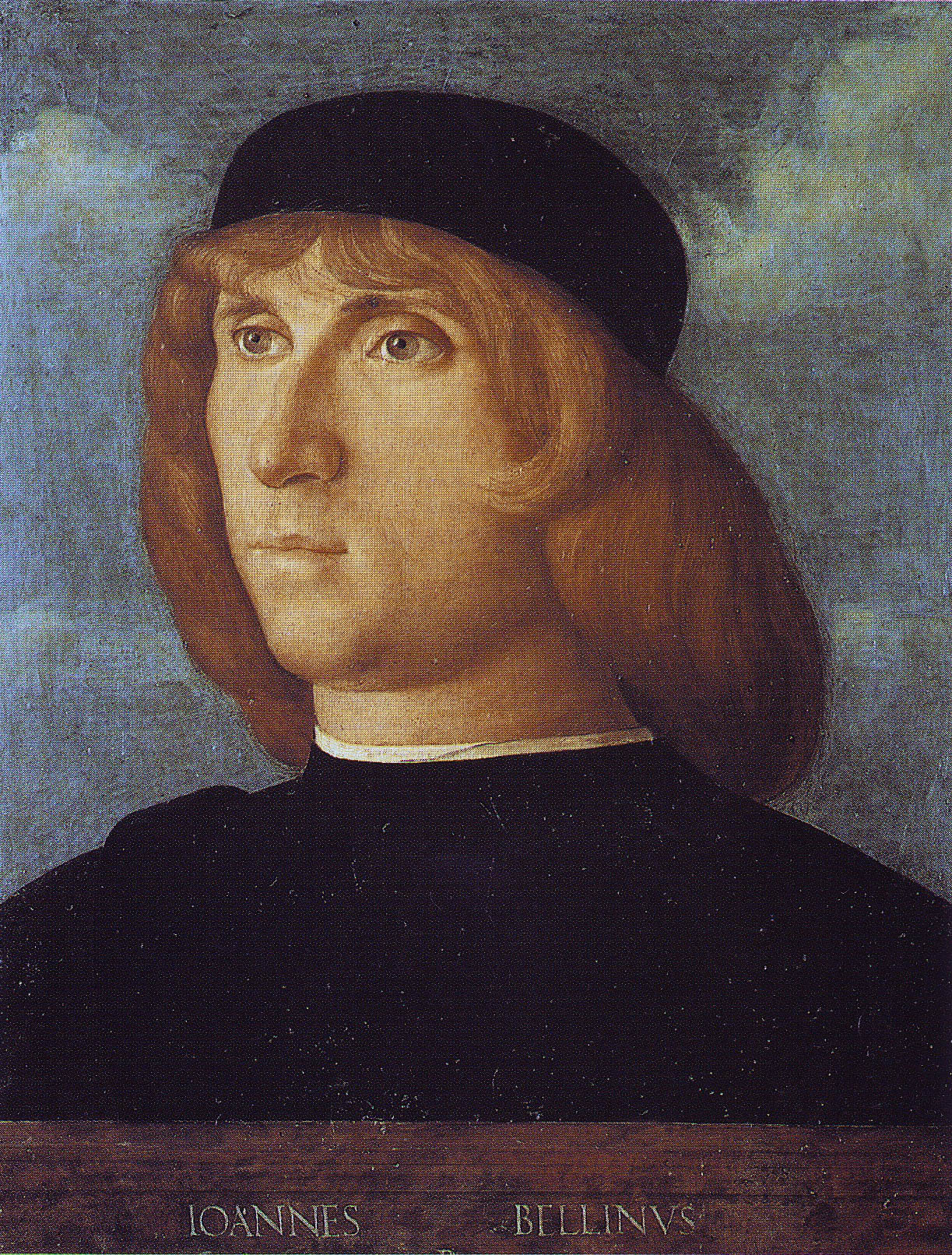
- Artist: Giovanni Bellini
- Year: c.1500
- Medium: Oil
- Dimensions: 34 cm × 26 cm (13 in × 10 in)
- Location: Capitoline Museums, Rome

Self-Portrait is a self-portrait in oils by the Italian painter Giovanni Bellini, dating to c.1500 and now in the Galleria Capitolina of the Capitoline Museums in Rome.

== See also ==
- List of works by Giovanni Bellini
