= Gethsemane Episcopal Church =

Gethsemane Episcopal Church may refer to:

in the United States

(by state)

- Gethsemane Episcopal Church (Marion, Indiana)
- Gethsemane Episcopal Church (Appleton, Minnesota), listed on the NRHP in Minnesota
- Gethsemane Episcopal Church (Minneapolis, Minnesota), listed on the NRHP in Minnesota
- Gethsemane Episcopal Church (Manhattan, Montana)

== See also ==
- Gethsemane Episcopal Cathedral (Fargo, North Dakota)
