= Agony in the Garden (Mantegna, London) =

Painting by Andrea Mantegna

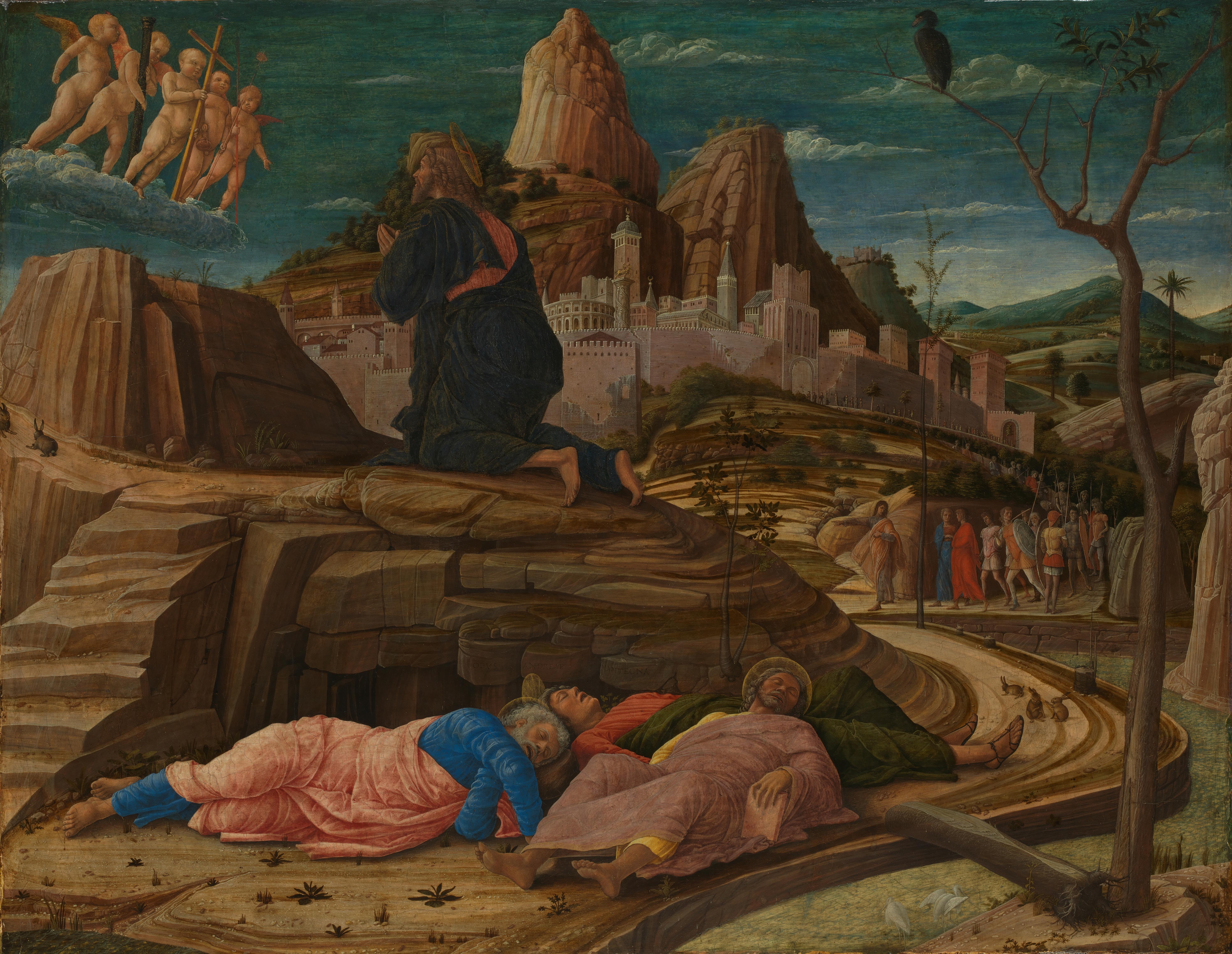
- Artist: Andrea Mantegna
- Year: 1455–1456
- Medium: Egg tempera on wood
- Dimensions: 62.9 cm × 80 cm (24.8 in × 31 in)
- Location: National Gallery, London
- Accession: NG1417

The Agony in the Garden is a painting of 1455–1456 by the Italian artist Andrea Mantegna in the National Gallery, London.

The painting shows Christ (at the centre) praying before a group of cherubs (at upper left) who are holding instruments of the Passion. Judas, the disciple who betrayed Christ, leads a group of soldiers (centre right) from Jerusalem to arrest him. Meanwhile, Christ's disciples Peter, James and John sleep (bottom).

Mantegna's brother-in-law Giovanni Bellini is considered to have been inspired by this painting for his own depiction of the subject, painted between 1460 and 1465 and also in the National Gallery.
