= Brera =

Brera may refer to:

== Places ==
- Brera (district of Milan), Italy
  - Biblioteca di Brera, a public library
  - Palazzo Brera, a monumental palace
    - Pinacoteca di Brera, a national art gallery in the Palazzo Brera, which also houses:
      - Brera Academy, a public art college
      - Brera Astronomical Observatory, observatory built in 1764
      - Brera Madonna, a painting by Piero della Francesca
      - Orto Botanico di Brera, a botanical garden

== Names ==
- Alfa Romeo Brera, a concept car presented in 2002 and a sports car produced between 2005 and 2010
- Brera Sterne, a Macross Frontier character
- Brera (surname), Italian surname

== Other uses ==
- Brera Calcio, a football club based in Milan
