= Brera, Milan =

Coordinates: 45°28′17″N 9°11′06″E

Brera
- Quartiere of Milan
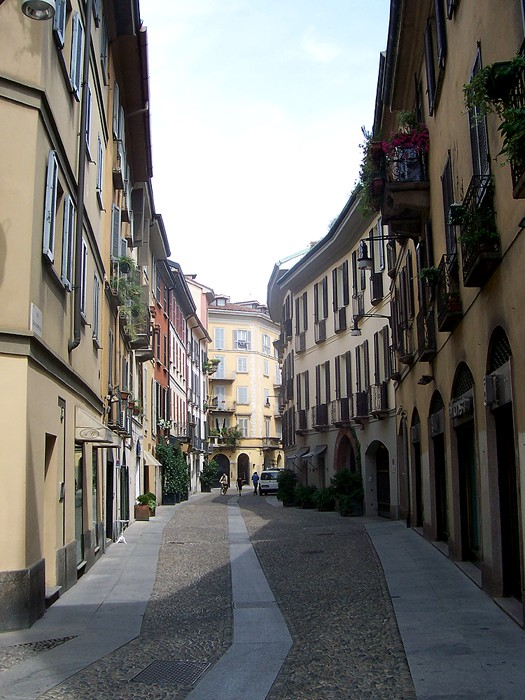
- Via Madonnina, one of the main streets of Brera

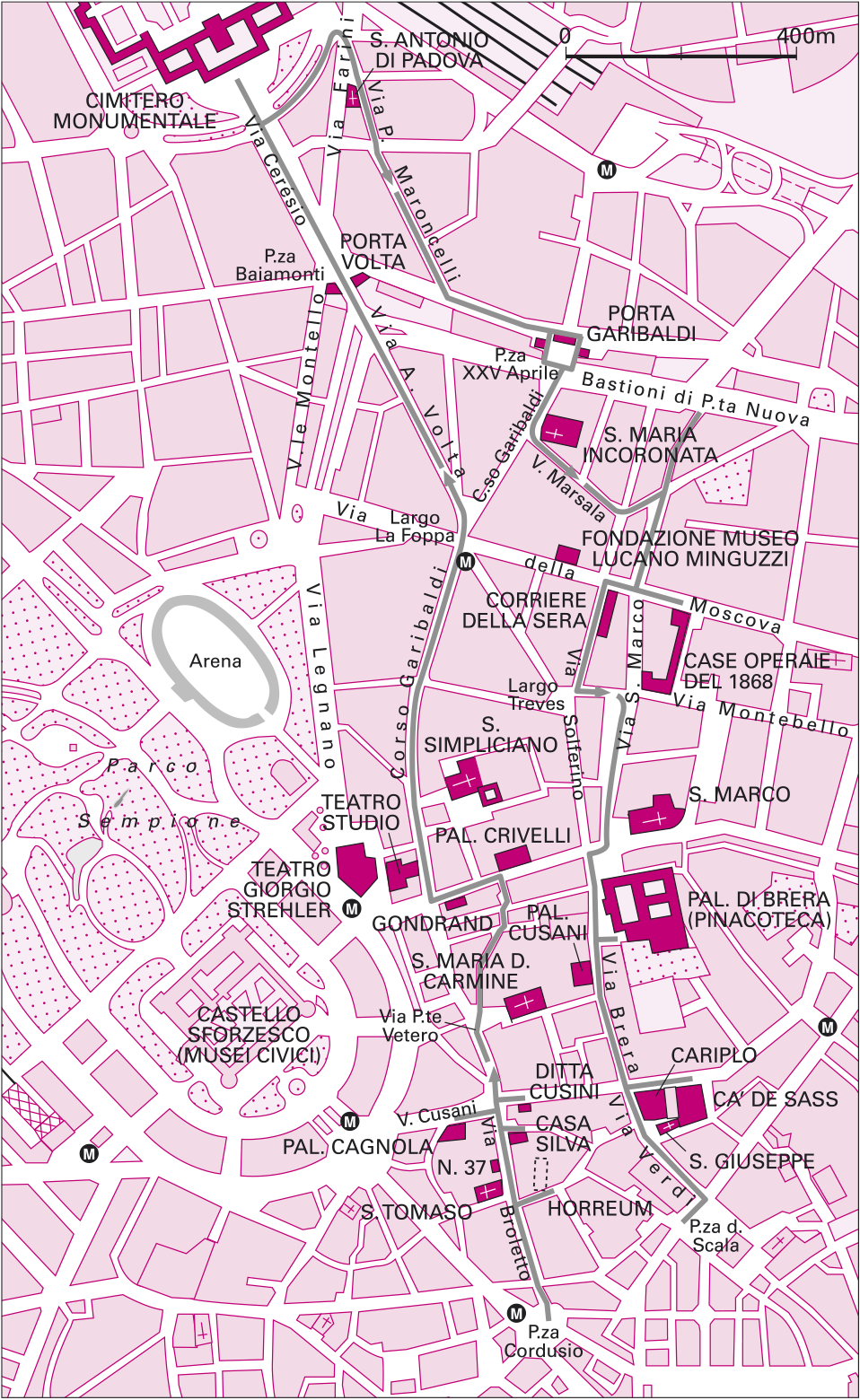
- Country: Italy
- Region: Lombardy
- Province: Milan
- Zone: 1
- Time zone: UTC+1 (CET)
  - Summer (DST): UTC+2 (CEST)

Brera is a district ("quartiere") of Milan, Italy. It is located within the Zone 1 (the historical core of the city) and it is centred on Via Brera. The name stems from Medieval Italian "braida" or "brera", derived from Old Lombardic "brayda" (often Latinized as "praedium"), meaning a land expanse either cleared of trees or naturally lacking them. This is because around the year 900, the Brera district was situated just outside Milan's city walls and was kept clear for military reasons. The root of the word is the same as that of the Dutch city of Breda's name and the English word "broad".

Brera houses the Brera Academy of Fine Arts and the Brera Art Gallery, which prominently contributed to the development of Brera as an artists' neighbourhood and a place of bohemian atmosphere, sometimes referred to as "the milanese Montmartre". Both the academy and the gallery are located in Palazzo Brera, the main historical building of the area; this same building also houses Milan's botanical garden as well as an astronomical observatory and the Braidense National Library. Other features that contribute to the character of Brera include restaurants, bars, nightclubs, antique and art shops, colourful street markets, as well as fortune tellers' booths.

From 1998 to 2002 novelist Paolo Brera, along with Franco Brera and Francesca Brera, edited and published the magazine Brera, devoted to the Brera district. Well-known journalists, art critics and fiction writers contributed over the years, including Rossana Bossaglia, Giuseppe Pontiggia, Guido Vergani, Vittoria Colpi, Carlo Castellaneta and Giulio Signori.
