= Brera (surname) =

Brera is an Italian surname. Notable people with the surname include:

- Gianni Brera (1919–1992), Italian writer and journalist
- Paolo Brera (1949–2019), Italian writer and journalist

== See also ==
- Brero
- Brena (surname)
- Brera (disambiguation)
