= Emilio Sommariva =

Italian painter and photographer

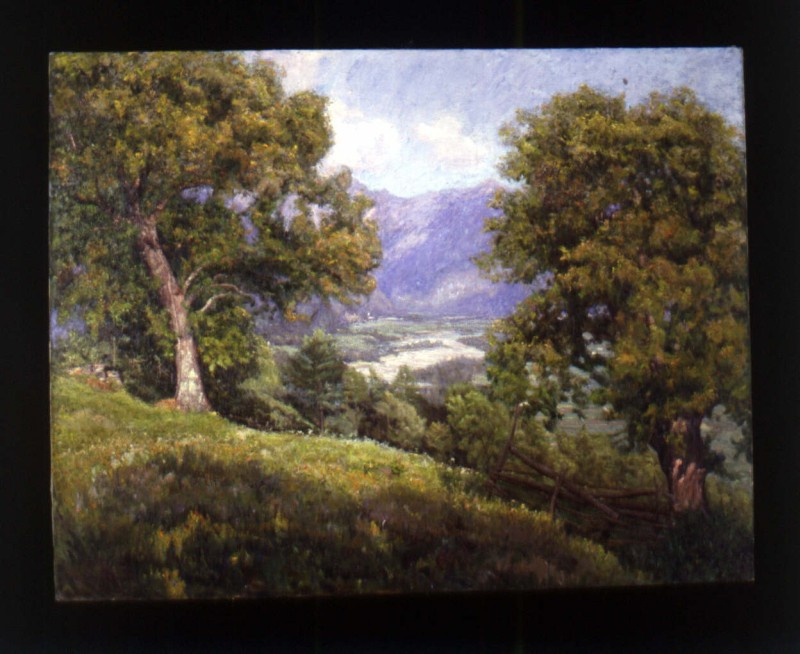
Paesaggio o Studio di paesaggio in Val Vigezzo, 1925 (Art collections of Fondazione Cariplo)

Emilio Sommariva (8 December 1883 – 12 September 1956) was an Italian painter and photographer.

== Biography ==
Sommariva was born in Lodi, Italy. His father, Luigi, was an amateur painter and photographer himself. The Sommariva family moved to Milan while Emilio was an infant. In 1897, age 14, he began to attend Angelo Comolli’s School of Decoration classes at the Brera Academy. In 1899, due to financial difficulties, he had to drop out of school. He was then employed as a photographer by the Compagnia Continentale Brunt & C. Foundry and subsequently by the Ganzini photographic studio. A few months later, in 1902 he opened his own studio in Viale Monforte (now Viale Pavia) with a wide terrace intended for portraiture photography. In the following years he relocated his studio to Via Paolo and Via Montenapoleone.

After a few difficult years, Sommariva eventually established himself as a portraitist as well as an able documentator of other artists's work, including Umberto Boccioni, Aroldo Bonzagni, Carlo Carrà and Futurists like Gaetano Previati and Adolfo Wildt.

Sommariva also specialized in industrial, architectural and landscape photographs. His work was acknowledged at the 1911 Esposizione Internazionale di Fotografia Artistica e Scientifica di Roma (where he won a gold medal) and the Turin Esposizione e Concorso Internazionale di Fotografia (where he received a diploma of honour). In 1922 he won the first prize at the International Exhibition of Professional Artistic Photography at the Royal Photographic Society in London. In the 1920s he also began to exhibit as a painter: he participated in the Brera Biennale in 1925, in the Venice Biennale in 1926 and in the exhibitions held at the Societá della Permanente in Milan. During this period he painted numerous landscapes inspired by the foothills of the Alps in Lombardy and Piedmont where he spent many summers in a house in Lanzo d'Intelvi.

In 1938, after refusing to become a Fascist Party carrying-card member, he had his photographer license withdrawn. In 1943, during an air raid over Milan, Sommariva's house and study were bombed. dEspite suffering significant damage, the majority of his original prints and plates were left intact.

In 1950 Sommariva's work was the subject of a retrospective exhibition at Galleria Ranzini in Milan.

Sommariva's archives, documents and photographs were purchased from his heirs in 1979 and are now part of the Braidense Library at Palazzo Brera. The collection includes 2,814 prints and about 50,000 negatives mostly on glass, as well as ten manuscripts, inventory papers, address books and other documents.

== Sources ==
- Laura Casone, Emilio Sommariva, online catalogue Artgate by Fondazione Cariplo, 2010, CC BY-SA (source for the first revision of this article).

== Other projects ==
Media related to Emilio Sommariva at Wikimedia Commons
