= Biblioteca di Brera =

Italian library in Milan

Coordinates: 45°28′18.84″N 9°11′15.89″E

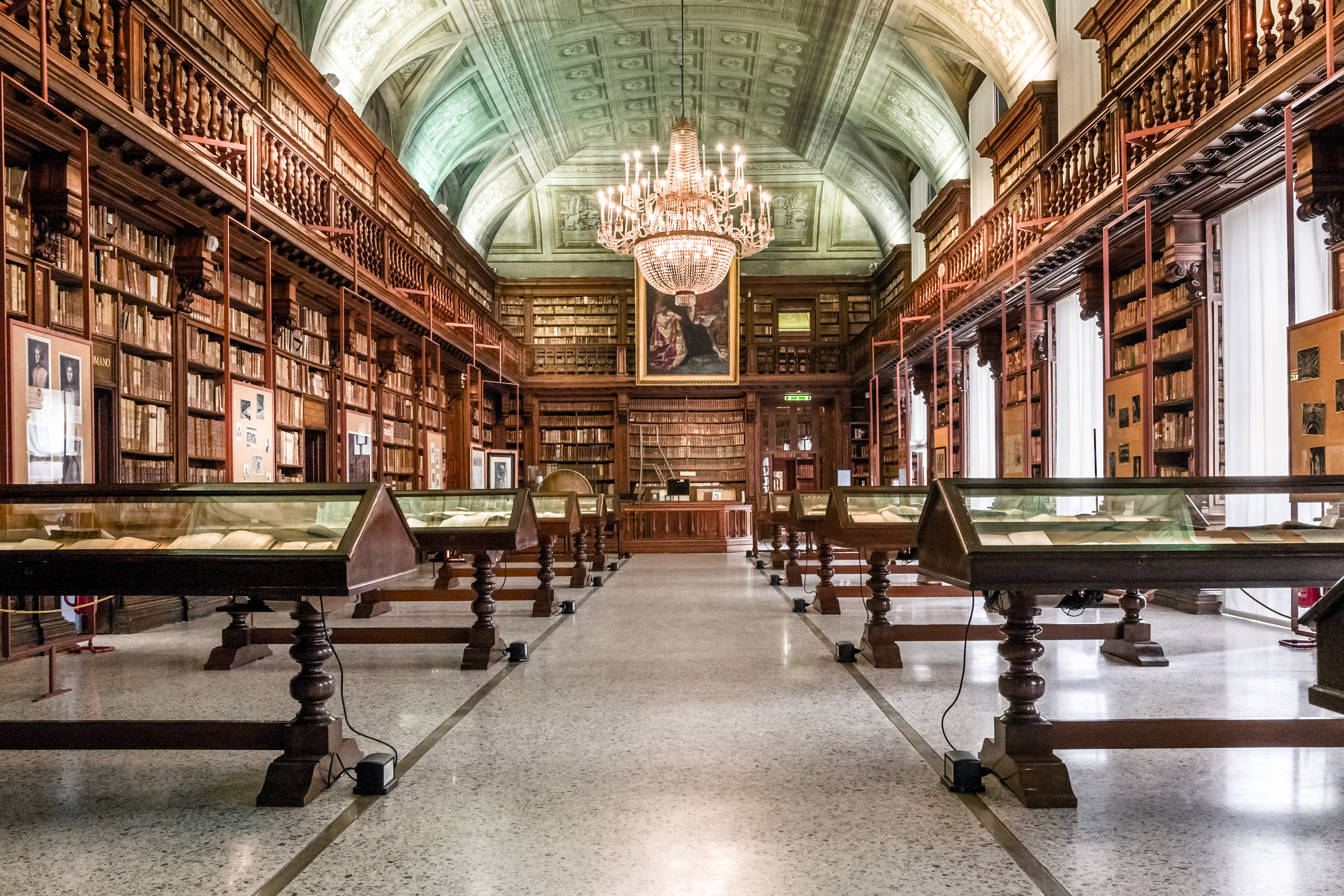
The Maria Teresa Hall of the Braidense Library

The Biblioteca Nazionale Braidense or Braidense National Library, usually known as the Biblioteca di Brera, is a public library in Milan, in northern Italy. It is one of the largest libraries in Italy. Initially, it contained large historical and scientific collections before it was charged with the legal deposit of all publications from Milan. Since 1880, it has had the status of a national library and is today one of the 47 Italian State libraries.

== History ==
The library was created in 1770 by Maria Theresa of Austria when she decided to make the collection she had acquired from Carlo Pertusati available to the public. The library was opened in 1786 in the Brera Palazzo del Collegio which had been taken over by the State following the dissolution of the Society of Jesus in 1773. In addition to the Pertusati collection, the library also contained the holdings of the Collegio Braidense and the Jesuit houses of San Fedele and San Girolamo.

Thereafter the library benefitted from various private collections and from the libraries of other religious orders which had been dissolved as well as duplicates from the Imperial Library in Vienna. From 1788, the collection was enhanced by adding publications received under legal deposit regulations which covered works published in the State of Milan. As a result, the Braidense became the regional legal deposit archive for Lombardy.

In 1880, the Braidense was given the status of national library.

== Premises ==
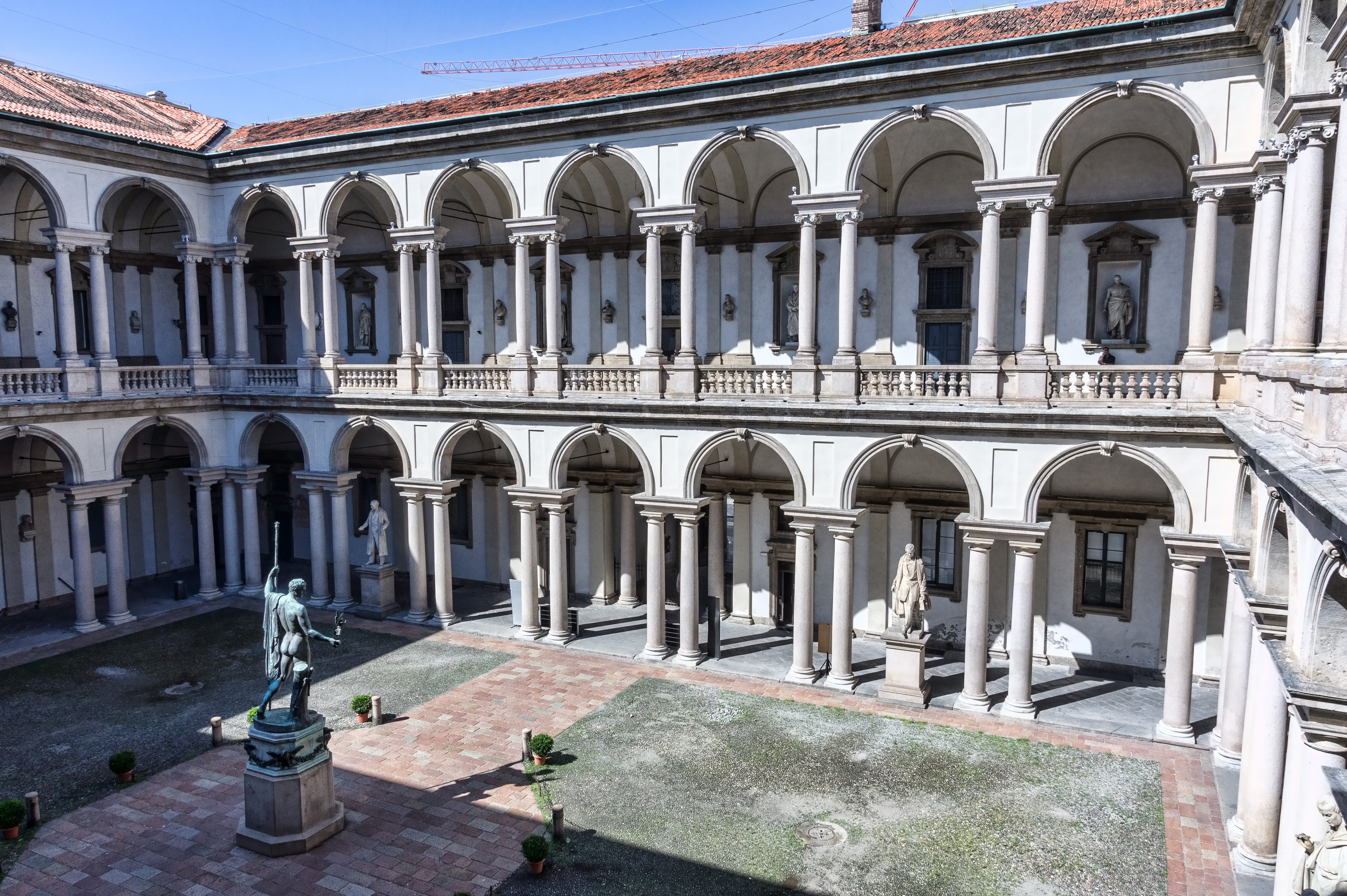
Milan's Palazzo di Brera which houses the Braidense Library

The library is located in the Palazzo di Brera, an imposing building constructed by the Jesuits in the 17th century. In addition to the library, it is also home to the Brera Art Gallery, the Brera Astronomical Observatory, the Brera Botanical Gardens, the Lombard Institute of Science and Letters and the Brera Academy of Fine Arts. Since 2003, it has also housed the Archivio Storico Ricordi, the historical records of the Ricordi classical music publishing company.

Among the library's facilities are the Maria Teresa Hall with bookshelves designed by the architect Giuseppe Piermarini, the Reading Room which was originally used by the Jesuits, the Research Reading Room with some 35,000 books, the Sala Manzoniana with manuscripts, correspondence and editions of the Italian romantic writer Alessandro Manzoni and the Catalogue Room, formerly the tailors' room in the Palazzo di Brera.

== Collections ==
Since the beginning, the Braidense was designed as a general library. The collections consisted of illuminated choral works, historical, literary, theological and legal publications as well as extensive general reference works.

Initially, the State Congregation for Lombardy formed the nucleus of the library from the collections of Count Carlo Pertusati obtained 1765), assembled as a public library in 1770 by Maria Theresa, princess of Austria. In 1773, the dissolution of the Jesuits, allowed the library to acquire the collections of the Palazzo of the Collegio Gesuitico di Brera, built in the area of the 13th century convent of the Umiliati. The site was chosen to host the library in 1786. The library also joined to this the Jesuit collections from the Collegio Braidense, and from San Fedele and San Girolamo. In 1778, the collection of the Bernese physician Albrecht von Haller, rich in botanical, medical, and scientific texts, was obtained. In the next years, the collections of colonel Baschiera, and a portion of the library of Count Firmian, some of which he had acquired from Giuseppe Beltramelli. In 1788, a law required all works (books and pamphlets) published in Lombardy were required to send a copy sent to the library. In 1793, this was expanded to legal edicts and documents. The collections of the Collegio dei Giureconsulti were added during the French occupation, and the Scaccerni collection was donated by Francesco Melzi. In 1795, the legacy from Cardinal Angelo Maria Durini containing some 3,000 works including valuable 16th-century Greek and Latin editions.

During the 19th century, the library acquired collections from Hermes Visconti, the Numismatic Cabinet, the Bodonian, the Mortara, the Lattes (works of Jewish culture), Viesseux miscellanea and from Cesare Correnti. In 1889 the theatre collection of Lauro Corniani Algarotti was donated by De Capitani D'Arzago. That year it bought at auction, the library of Carlo Morbio (1811-1881), including 156 codices from the librarian Ackerman of Leipzig. In 1885, the manuscripts and library of Alessandro Manzoni were donated in 1885. In the 20th century, the library acquired the Novati library, the liturgical library of the Duchy of Parma, the chess collection, the Castiglioni collection and the photographic collection of Emilio Sommariva.

The Braidense has always had the dual role of both the preservation of historical and literary works and of maintaining its collection of all books published in Milan. It currently has 898,377 printed volumes, 2,119 manuscripts and 2,368 incunabula.

== See also ==
- Neoclassical architecture in Milan
- National Central Library (Florence)
- Biblioteca Nazionale Centrale di Roma
- Biblioteca Nazionale Vittorio Emanuele III
- Turin National University Library
- Biblioteca Nazionale Marciana

== Bibliography ==
- Aurelio Aghemo, La Biblioteca nazionale Braidense, "Biblioteche Oggi", Milan, Ed. Bibliografica, n. 8, October 2008, pp. 15–20.
