= Napoleon as Mars the Peacemaker (Milan) =

Sculpture by Antonio Canova

Napoleon as Mars the Peacemaker by Antonio Canova, version in bronze
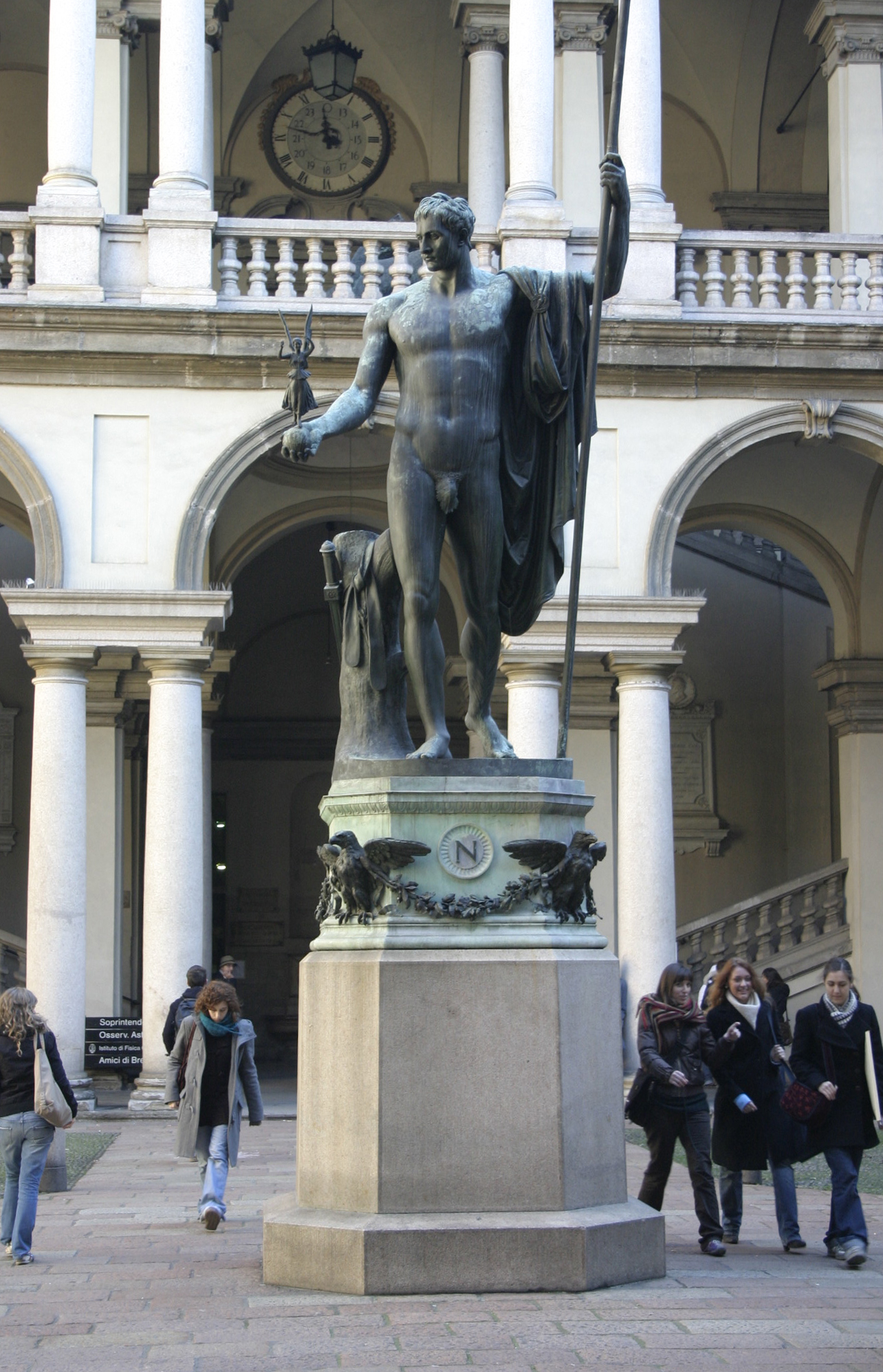
- Artist: Antonio Canova
- Year: 1810
- Type: Sculpture
- Medium: Bronze
- Location: Courtyard of Honour of the Brera Palace; Milan

Napoleon as Mars the Peacemaker is a bronze cast of the marble sculpture of the same name by Antonio Canova. It was commissioned from Canova in spring 1807 by Charles-Jean-Marie Alquier, French ambassador to Rome, for 5,000 Louis as a gift to Eugene de Beauharnais, viceroy of the Kingdom of Italy. It was cast in 1810 and De Beauharnais sent it to Milan in May 1812, but the city found it difficult to find a site for it. It was finally moved to its present site in the main courtyard (Courtyard of Honour) of the Palazzo di Brera (now the Pinacoteca di Brera) and inaugurated there on 14 August 1859 during Napoleon III's visit.

== History ==
In the spring of 1807 the minister Charles-Jean-Marie Alquier, French ambassador to Rome, on the instructions of Prince Eugène de Beauharnais, Viceroy of the Kingdom of Italy and Napoleon's stepson, commissioned from Antonio Canova, for the sum of five thousand French louis, an exact bronze copy of the marble statue Napoleon Bonaparte as Mars the Peacemaker.

=== The preparatory plaster model ===
The large preparatory plaster model, now preserved in Room XIV of the Pinacoteca di Brera, is one of five commissioned by Canova in preparation for the lost-wax casting of the monument to Napoleon. Like the other four, it was made by Vincenzo Malpieri in 1808 and was intended for the library of the University of Padua, for Canova's friend Daniele Francesconi. However, the crates containing the large plaster—over 3 metres high and weighing nearly two tonnes—remained for a long time in the customs offices of Padua because Francesconi was unable to pay the 330 scudi required for its clearance. After negotiations with the Government of the Kingdom of Italy, the plaster was purchased in very poor condition and assigned to the Royal Academy of Fine Arts. Removed from the Napoleonic halls as early as 1814, the work was stored in the Academy's basements and later in Room VI. Withdrawn in 2008, it was restored and placed in Room XIV of the gallery in May 2009.

=== Difficulties of placement ===
In May 1812 the Viceroy ordered that the statue be erected in Milan “in a suitable place”; the Minister of the Interior Luigi Vaccari (in office from 1809 to 1814) therefore invited Senator Luigi Castiglioni, then president of the Academy of Fine Arts, to propose a location and a design for the pedestal. When the work arrived in Milan it was placed in a corner of the portico of the Palazzo delle Scienze; members of the Brera Academy suggested erecting the monument in Piazza del Duomo or in what is now Piazza Fontana, in the niche of the former Piazza de’ Tribunali, where the statue of Philip II had previously stood.

Because of disagreements over the location, the Viceroy ordered that it be temporarily placed in the second courtyard of the Palazzo del Senato; however, when the order was delayed, the architect Giuseppe Zanoia, then president of the Academy, obtained in June 1813 permission for it to be temporarily deposited in the Hall of Antiquities.

After Napoleon's fall the statue was stored in the Academy's basements, where it remained until 3 March 1857, when the Emperor of Austria, during a stay in Milan, ordered that "for that statue a suitable pedestal be immediately erected, at state expense, and that it then be placed upon it in the public gardens of this capital."

=== The Brera courtyard ===
Thanks to the visit of Napoleon III to Milan, the monument was placed at the centre of the Courtyard of Honour of the Brera Palace, its present location, on 14 August 1859, with a large inaugural ceremony and a speech by Giulio Carcano.

A new inauguration took place on 8 November 1864 for the definitive positioning on the pedestal designed by Luigi Bisi.

At the outbreak of the Second World War, the gallery was emptied of all treasures that could be moved: for Canova’s statue it was decided to enclose it in a protective wooden crate and sandbags. The war struck the Via Brera district heavily on the night of 7–8 August 1943, and three-quarters of the exhibition rooms were destroyed or damaged by fire. The flames affected even the statue's protective crate, but an inspection the following morning confirmed that the statue had remained unharmed.

== Restorations ==
In 2014 the monumental bronze underwent a meticulous restoration aimed at halting the effects of atmospheric agents and the resulting chemical-physical alterations of the material.

== Bibliography ==
- Carcano, Giulio (1859). Per l'inaugurazione della statua colossale di Napoleone I., opera di Canova, in Milano, il giorno XIV Agosto MDCCCLIX. Milan: coi tipi di Luigi di Giacomo Pirola.

== See also ==
- Palazzo di Brera
- Neoclassicism in Milan
