= Corniani =

Corniani is an Italian surname. Notable people of this name include the following:

- Bernardino Corniani (1626–1689), Italian bishop
- Iris Corniani (born 1958), Italian swimmer
- Lauro Corniani Algarotti (1767–1827), Italian writer and librettist
