= Angelo Comolli =

Italian painter

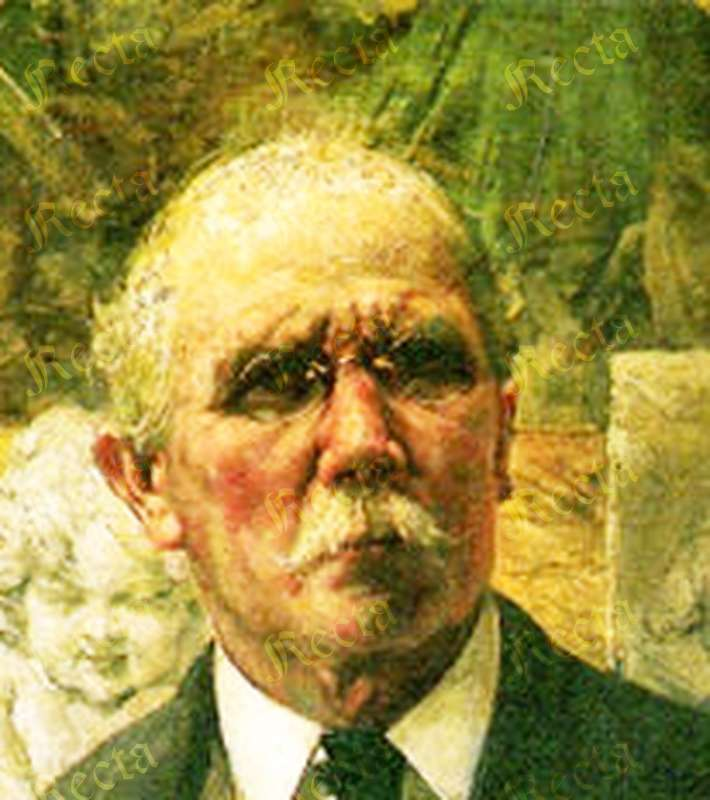
Self-portrait

Angelo Comolli (1863 – 24 June 1949) was an Italian painter.

== Biography ==
He was born in Milan. Angelo studied at the Accademia di Brera in Milan under Giuseppe Bertini. Angelo would hold a teaching position at the academy until his death. Among his pupils were Emilio Sommariva and Carlo Carrà.

He helped decorate with frescoes the Palazzo della Borsa, Casa Verdi, and the facade of San Giovanni Battista at Induno Olona. At the former Abbey of Morimondo is now the Civico museo Angelo Comolli, displaying some of his works and designs. He appears to have bought the abbey in 1917 and donated it to the commune.

Note: In 1790, a different Angelo Comolli published a putative original biography of Raphael, supposedly predating Vasari.

== Sources ==
- Italian Wikipedia entry
