= Maraschi =

Maraschi is a surname. Notable people with the surname include:

- Anthony Maraschi (1820–1897), Italian Roman Catholic priest
- Bartolomeo Maraschi (died 1487), Italian Roman Catholic bishop
- Laura Maraschi (born 1942), Italian astronomer
- Mario Maraschi (1939–2020), Italian footballer
