= Carlo Morbio =

Italian bibliophile, historian, and numismatist

Carlo Morbio (1 April 1811 – 27 January 1881) was an Italian bibliophile, historian, and numismatist.

He was born in Novara, but lived mainly in Milan. He wrote a number of treatises regarding historical events in Milan and Lombardy. He was an avid bibliophile and collector of manuscripts; the collection now resides in Biblioteca Braidense. He was knighted into the order of the Iron Crown of Italy.

== Works ==
- Opere storico-numismatiche di C. Morbio e descrizione illustrata delle sue raccolte in Milano; By Carlo Morbio; Presso Gaetano Romagnoli, Bologna 1870
- Storie dei municipi italiani illustrate con documenti inediti; by Carlo Morbio; coi torchi di Omobono Manini; Milan, 1838.
