= Brero =

Brero is an Italian surname. Notable people with the surname include:

- Giulio Cesare Brero (1908– 1973), Italian composer, music educator, and lawyer
- Mario Brero (born 1946),Italian private detective

== See also ==
- Brera (surname)
