= Morimondo =

Morimondo Marmond (Lombard)
- Comune
- Comune di Morimondo
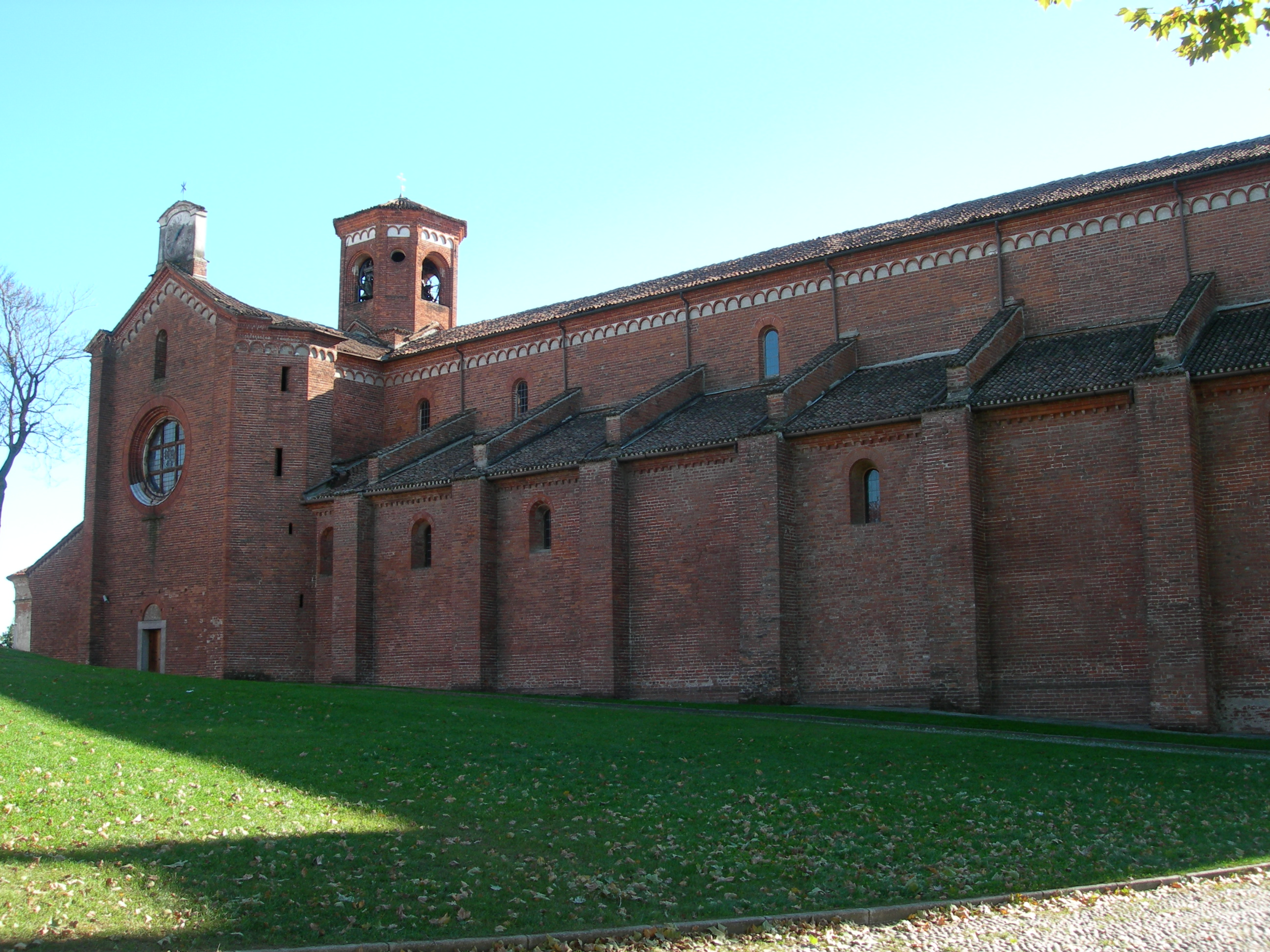
- Abbey of Morimondo

- Coat of arms

- Location within Italy Location within Lombardy
- Coordinates: 45°21′N 8°57′E
- Country: Italy
- Region: Lombardy
- Metropolitan city: Milan (MI)

Government
  - Mayor: Marco Natale Marelli

Area
  - Total: 26.2 km^{2} (10.1 sq mi)
- Elevation: 109 m (358 ft)

Population (30 November 2017)
  - Total: 1,120
  - Density: 42.7/km^{2} (111/sq mi)
- Demonym: Morimondesi
- Time zone: UTC+1 (CET)
  - Summer (DST): UTC+2 (CEST)
- Postal code: 20081
- Dialing code: 02
- Patron saint: St. Bernard of Clairvaux
- Saint day: 20 August
- Website: Official website

Morimondo (Western Lombard: Morimond [muriˈmũːt], locally Marmond [marˈmũːt]) is a comune (municipality) in the Metropolitan City of Milan in the Italian region of Lombardy, located about 20 kilometres (12 mi) southwest of Milan.

Home to the Abbey of Morimondo, to which it owes the name, it is one of I Borghi più belli d'Italia ("The most beautiful villages of Italy").
