= Napoleon as Mars the Peacemaker =

Statue by Antonio Canova

Coordinates: 51°30′13″N 0°09′06″W

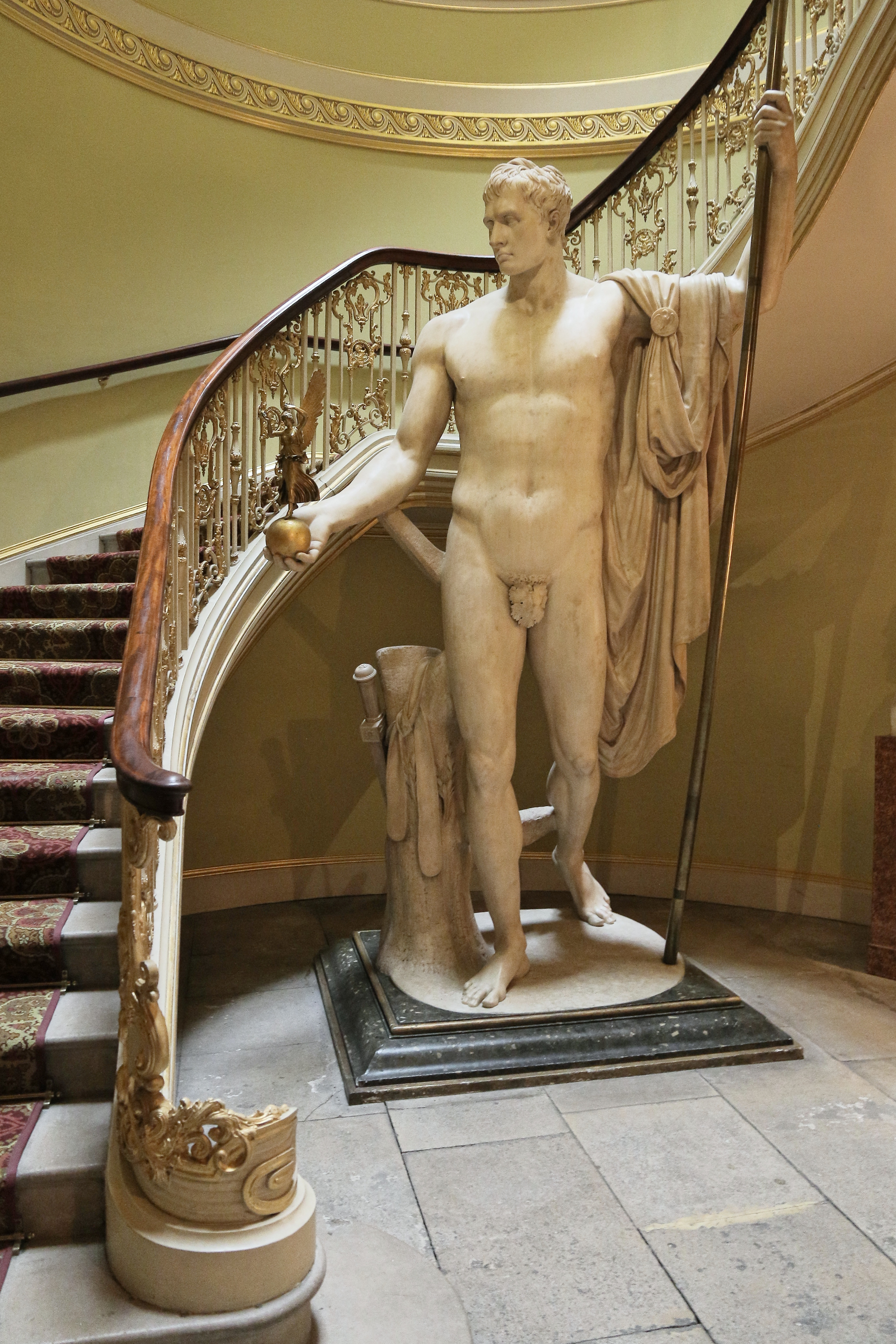
- Artist: Antonio Canova
- Year: 1802–1806
- Medium: white marble gilded bronze
- Dimensions: 345 cm (136 in)
- Location: Apsley House, London

Napoleon as Mars the Peacemaker is a colossal heroic nude marble statue by the Italian Neoclassical artist Antonio Canova, of Napoleon I of France in the guise of the Roman god Mars. It depicts Napoleon holding a gilded Nike or Victory standing on an orb in his right hand and a staff in his left. It was produced between 1802 and 1806 and stands 3.45 metres to the raised left hand. Once on display in the Louvre in Paris, it was purchased from Louis XVIII in 1816 by the British government, which granted it to the Duke of Wellington. It is now on display in Robert Adam's stairwell at the Duke's London residence, Apsley House.

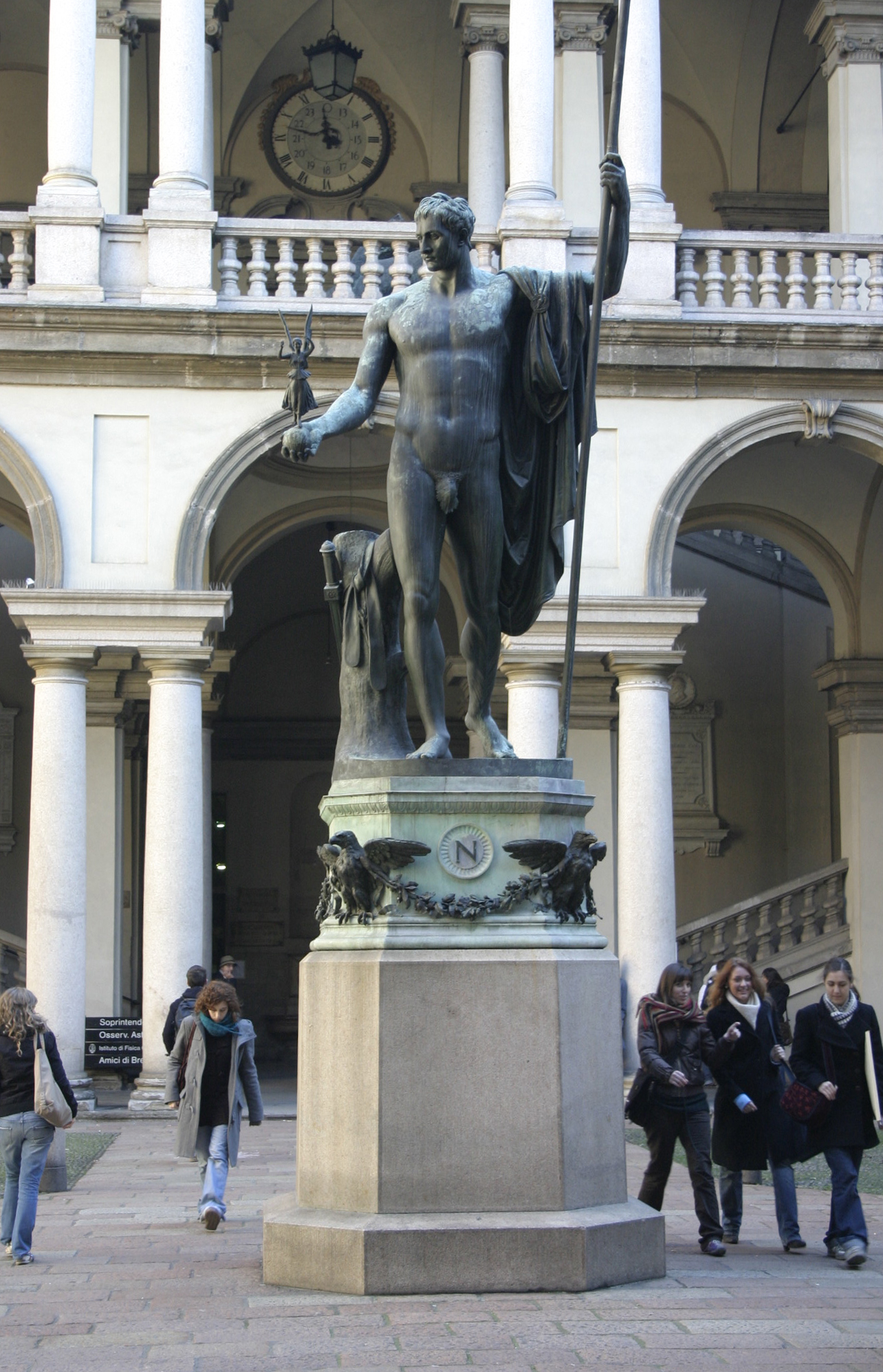
The 1811 bronze copy of the statue in the courtyard of Palazzo Brera, Milan

== History ==
At Napoleon's personal and insistent demand, Canova went to Paris in 1802 to model a bust of him. In 1803, after his return to Rome, he began work on the full-length sculpture; it was completed in 1806. Its idealised nude physique draws on the iconography of Augustus, and it was always intended for an interior entrance-hall setting rather than as a freestanding piazza sculpture, though some accounts give the centre of the courtyard of the Palazzo del Senato as the original intended site for the sculpture, following plans drawn up by the architect Luigi Canonica. France's ambassador in Rome François Cacault and the director of French museums Vivant Denon both saw the sculpture while it was a work in progress: Cacault wrote in 1803 that it "must become the most perfect work of this century", whilst Denon wrote back to Napoleon in 1806 that it belonged indoors in the Musée Napoléon "among the emperors and in the niche where the Laocoon is, in such a manner that it would be the first object that one sees on entering". In late 1810 the sculpture was transported to France, reaching Paris on 1 January 1811. When Napoleon saw it there in April 1811 he refused to accept it, calling it "too athletic" and banning the public from seeing it.

By 1814, the sculpture was in the Salle des Hommes Illustres, hidden behind a canvas screen, where it was probably first seen by Wellington. In the era after the battle of Waterloo, Canova, who was still regarded as the best living artist, with his works in great demand from English patrons in particular, supported the return of looted sculptures from the Musée Napoléon to their original collections. The Musée Napoléon reverted to being the Louvre and its looted sculptures such as the Apollo Belvedere were returned to their original collections. The removal of the Napoleon was also mooted, and Canova offered to re-purchase it. It was sold to the British government in 1816 for 66,000 francs (then under £3,000), which the Louvre spent on re-installing its Salle des Antiques. Works by Canova were already being collected by the Duke, and the Prince Regent presented it to him later that year. It was moved to the stairwell in Apsley House in 1817, where the floor under the statue was specially strengthened in order to accommodate the additional weight. It is still on display there.

== Bronze in Milan ==
In 1811 a bronze copy of the statue was cast in Rome by Francesco Righetti and his son Luigi, using the bronze of the cannons of Castel Sant'Angelo in Rome. A previous attempt to cast the statue had failed. Since 1859 the bronze has stood in the main courtyard of Palazzo Brera, home of the Accademia di Belle Arti di Brera and the Pinacoteca di Brera, in Milan, in Lombardy in northern Italy. It was at first on a temporary base; this was replaced in 1864 with the present base designed by Luigi Bisi, in granite and Carrara marble, with bronze decorations. The gilded bronze winged victory on the globe in the right hand of the figure was stolen on 25 October 1978; it was replaced with a replica in the 1980s.

== Plaster casts ==
In spite of the poor reception of the marble statue, Canova had it cast in plaster. Five copies were made, and were destined for the Academie di Belle Arti of Italy. The best-preserved of these is now, following restoration in Florence, in the Pinacoteca di Brera. It was initially sent, divided into eight sections, to Padua; however, it was not paid for and stayed in its packing-cases. It was bought by Napoleon's step-son, the viceroy Eugène de Beauharnais, and was on display in the Galleria Reale in Palazzo Brera from 1809 to 1814. After the fall of Napoleon it was relegated to the storerooms of the Accademia, where it remained until 2008. It was restored, and installed in the Pinacoteca di Brera in 2009 for the bicentenary of the gallery.
