= Morimondo Abbey =

Former Cistercian monastery in northern Italy

Coordinates: 45.3500°N 8.9500°E

- Abbazia di Morimondo (Italian); Badia de Marmond (Lombard)
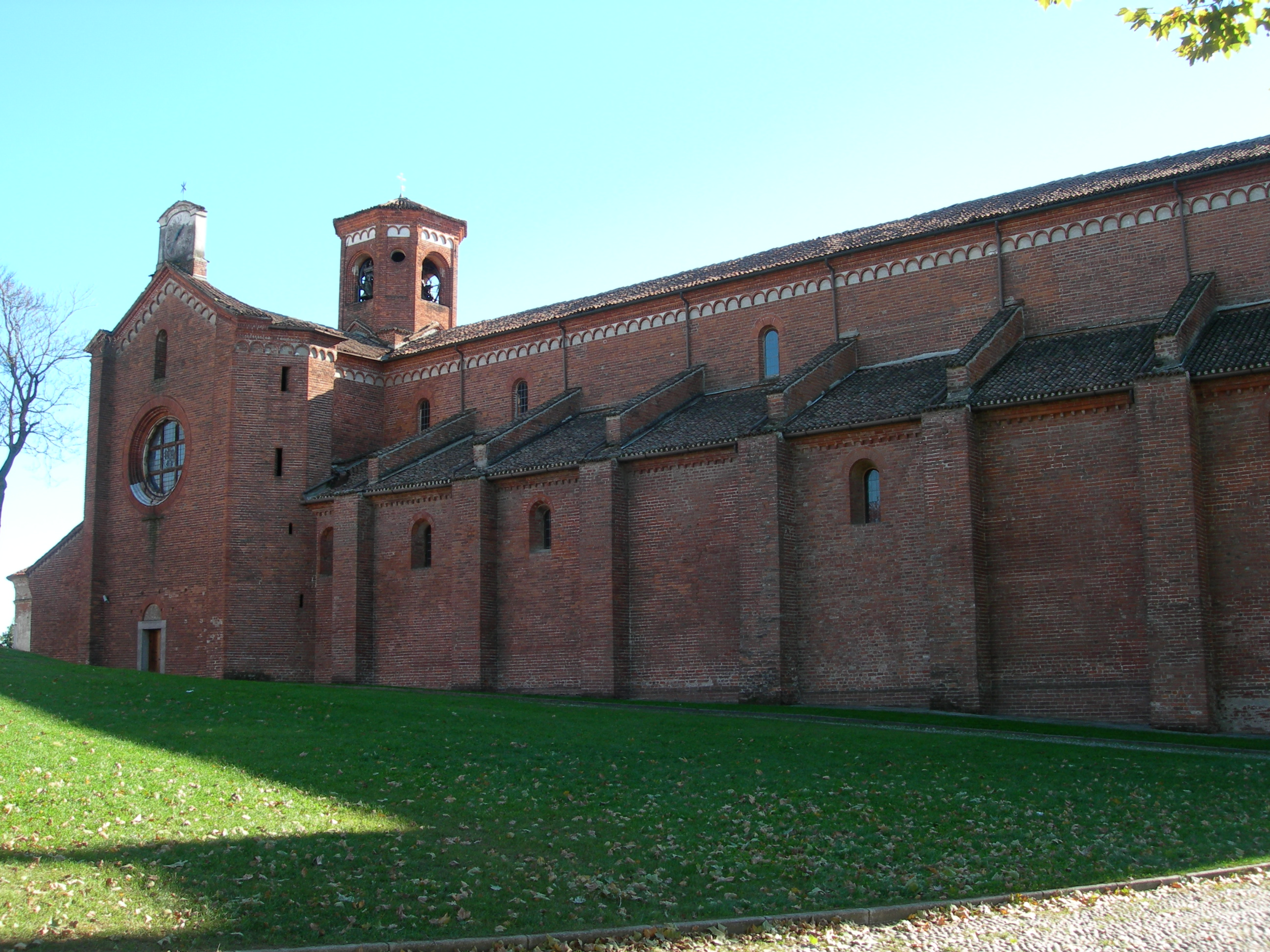
- The abbey from the north.

Religion
- Affiliation: Catholic
- Province: Milan

Location
- Location: Morimondo, Italy
- Interactive map of Morimondo Abbey

Architecture
- Type: Church
- Style: Gothic
- Completed: 1296

Morimondo Abbey (Italian: Abbazia di Morimondo; Western Lombard: Badia de Marmond) is a former Cistercian monastery located at Morimondo, a few kilometers south of Abbiategrasso in the Metropolitan City of Milan, Lombardy, northern Italy. The surviving structure is Romanesque and Gothic. It was founded in 1134 as a daughter house of Morimond Abbey near Dijon, France, from which it took its name.

== History ==
=== Origins ===
The history of the abbey begins on October 4, 1134 when a group of founding monks arrived from the mother house of Morimond in France. The monks settled in Coronate (now a frazione of Morimondo) and later chose the location for their monastery in Morimondo, about a mile away. Probably, the monastery was already partially built when they moved to Morimondo on November 11, 1136. Soon after its foundation the abbey acquired patrons and postulants from all social classes and the community of the monks had a rapid growth in the number of vocations. Even before the construction of the church, the monks founded two further communities, in Acquafredda near Como (1143) and in Casalvolone near Novara (1169). Further proofs of the flourishing activity in Morimondo was the Scriptorium, aimed at creating the monastic library and at supplying the two new daughter houses with some basic books, and the large agricultural holdings of the motherhouse, on which several granges were in fact settled in the surroundings.

The building of the church began in 1182 and was finished in 1296. There was a delay with respect to the building of the monastery and it was due to disputes with the clergy of Casorate, a village few miles from Morimondo. A long period of interruptions (probably a few years) occurred after December 1237 when the monastery was assaulted by Pavian troops and various monks were killed. Indeed, militants from Pavia and Milan often looted the area and wars hampered the success of the abbey. Frederick Barbarossa and his troops looted Morimondo in 1161. An interruptions occurred also in 1245 due, once again, to the raids of the imperial troops.

=== 14th and 15th centuries ===
At its peak the community numbered 50 choir monks and 200 conversi (lay brothers who had become members of the monastic community, without the obligation to full choir office, and were in charge of the management of the productive activities of the monastery and relations with the outside world).

A slow decline began in the 14th century due to different circumstances. One of them was the looting in 1314 but most damaging was the introduction of the commendatory system in 1450, a conversion which occurred in many abbeys with Cardinal Giovanni Visconti, Archbishop of Milan, Commendatory Abbot of Morimondo. Abbots after Giovanni Visconti include Cardinal Branda Castiglioni, a humanist, and Giovanni de' Medici, later Pope Leo X. Being concerned to revive the spiritual life of Morimondo, in 1499 Giovanni de' Medici sent eight monks from the Cistercian abbey of Settimo Fiorentino to Morimondo.

=== 16th-18th centuries ===
The restored stability led to reconstruction of the cloister around the year 1500, the reconstruction of the portal of the sacristy, the painting of the fresco of the Madonna and Child (1515) attributed to Bernardino Luini, and finally the carved wooden choir of 1522.

In 1564 the abbey became a parish after a decision of St. Charles Borromeo, archbishop of Milan, and the change gave new fervour to Morimondo. In the same year Borromeo stripped the Abbey of its land-holdings, in order to give financial aid to the Ospedale Maggiore of Milan. Another fervent period was in the 17th century when the abbot Antonio Libanori (1648-1652) from Ferrara was able to effect a revival of the cultural and spiritual life of the monastic community. During the 18th century, palaces were built at the north and west sides of the cloister. The abbey was suppressed on May 31, 1798 in the wake of the French Revolution; the Cistercian monks were expelled, and the illuminated manuscript of the library were dispersed.

=== 19th-21st centuries ===
From 1805 to 1950, priests at the former monastic church continued to minister to the parish. In 1941 the Blessed Cardinal Ildefonso Schuster, archbishop of Milan, wishing to restore the monastery, made contact with the Trappist Fathers of the Cistercian Order of the Tre Fontane Abbey in Rome, but with no success. Then, in 1950, the Congregation of the Oblates of the Virgin Mary was settled in the monastery. In 1991, Cardinal Carlo Maria Martini entrusted the pastoral care of the parish to the Congregation of the Servants of the Immaculate Heart of Mary with a new call to revive the abbey of Morimondo as a center of spirituality. The "Fondazione Abbatia Sancte Marie de Morimundo" aims at promoting the cultural and religious heritage of the abbey by organizing seminars, exhibitions, visits to the church and nearby building.

The abbey has been used as a set for Cado dalle nubi, a 2006 movie on immigration from South Italy starring Checco Zalone, and for Benedetti dal Signore, a 2004 Italian television series set in a convent of Franciscan friars. The abbey has given the name to the Rotary Club Morimondo Abbazia which was founded in 2013, a parallel being acknowledged between the compassionate and industrious attitude of Cistercian monks and the rotarian commitment to "service above self". The Foundation Abbatia Sancte Marie de Morimundo was established on April 17, 1993 as a non-profit private foundation recognized on July 12, 1994 by the Italian Ministry of Cultural and Environmental Heritage (act no. 149, entry 1800/a). The Foundation is named after the ex libris of the illuminated manuscripts produced in the monastic scriptorium in the twelfth and thirteenth centuries. The aims of the Foundation are to develop cultural and religious activities at Morimondo Abbey and to promote the maintenance of the architectural heritage of the monastery. In December 2007, the Lombardy Region has recognized the monastery as a regional museum, run by the Foundation Abbatia Sancte Marie de Morimundo. The museum is divided into two sections: - The Museum of the Abbey, which was created to promote the whole buildings of the Cistercian abbey (cloister, chapter house, working rooms of the monks, hall of the founders, porch, dining hall, dormitory) - The Civic Museum Angelo Comolli, an Art Nouveau painter and fresco painter.

== The monastery ==
A peculiarity of Morimondo Abbey is that the buildings of the monastery are built on several floors due to being built on the side of a depression. The cloister occupies the third floor above iitwo levels of large rooms with a vaulted ceiling supported by columns. Moreover, the monks' dormitory (originally a single room) is just over the chapter house. The presence of different levels is apparent in and southern parts of the monastery, but it can be seen also in the Lay brothers' buildings.

=== The Church ===
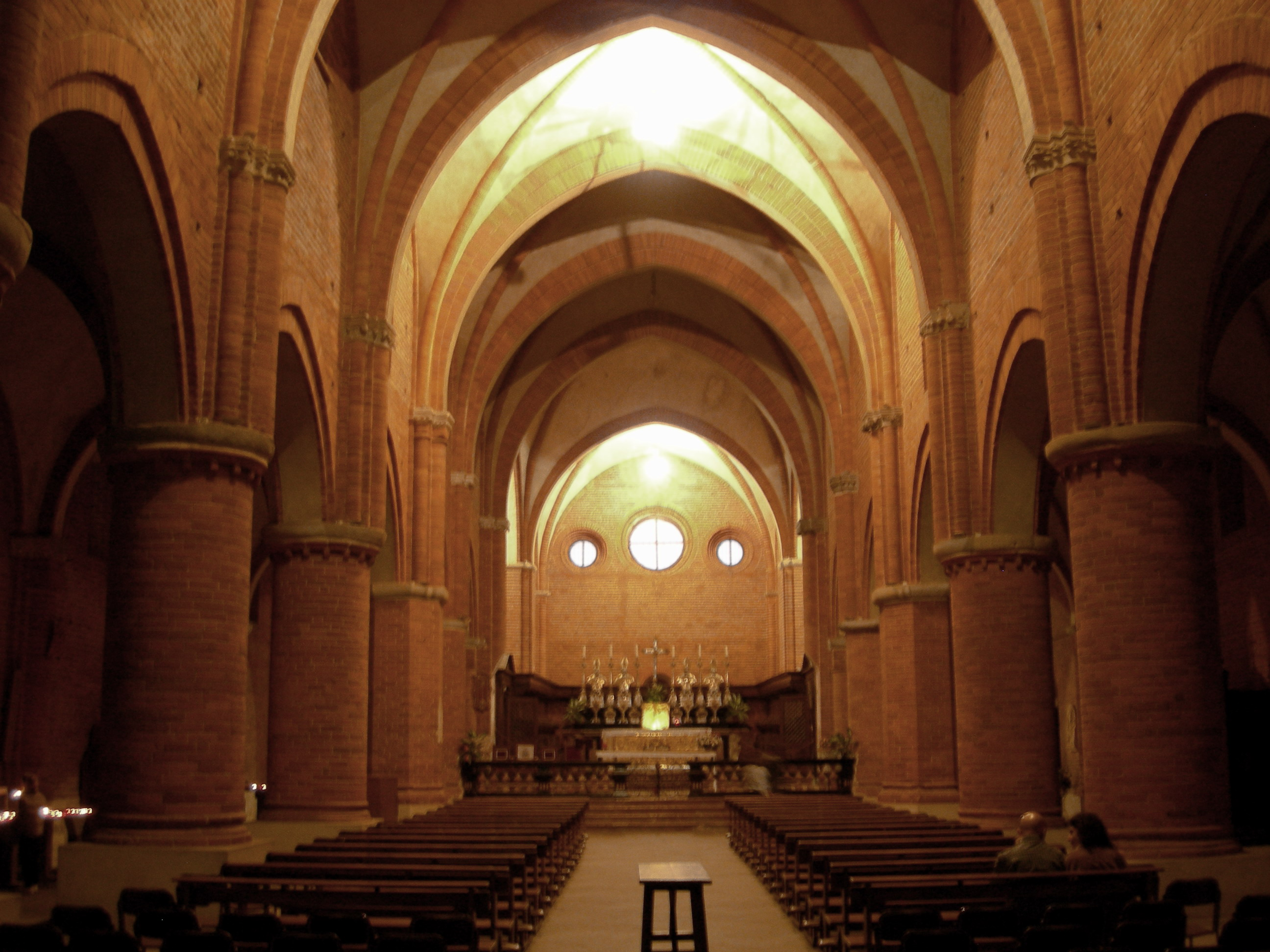
The nave

While Morimondo Abbey is the fourth Cistercian monastery founded in Italy (1134) and the first in Lombardy, the abbey church is quite different from all other 12th-century Cistercian buildings. The church construction being postponed till 1182, previous architectural experiences were exploited and surpassed. In fact, the Cistercian architecture in Morimondo Abbey adopts some gothic features, e.g. the cross vaulted arches, which can also create rectangular spans. Spans with a rectangular basis in the nave are paired with spans with a square basis in the side naves, and the sense of verticality is dramatically increased. The magnificence of Morimondo is related to its eight spans, while previous abbey churches are smaller. The majesty of the church of Morimondo comes mainly from its total austerity and the image of order given by the bricks used in the building. The Renaissance and Baroque styles did not alter the spirit of the 12th-century building.

=== Wooden choirstalls ===
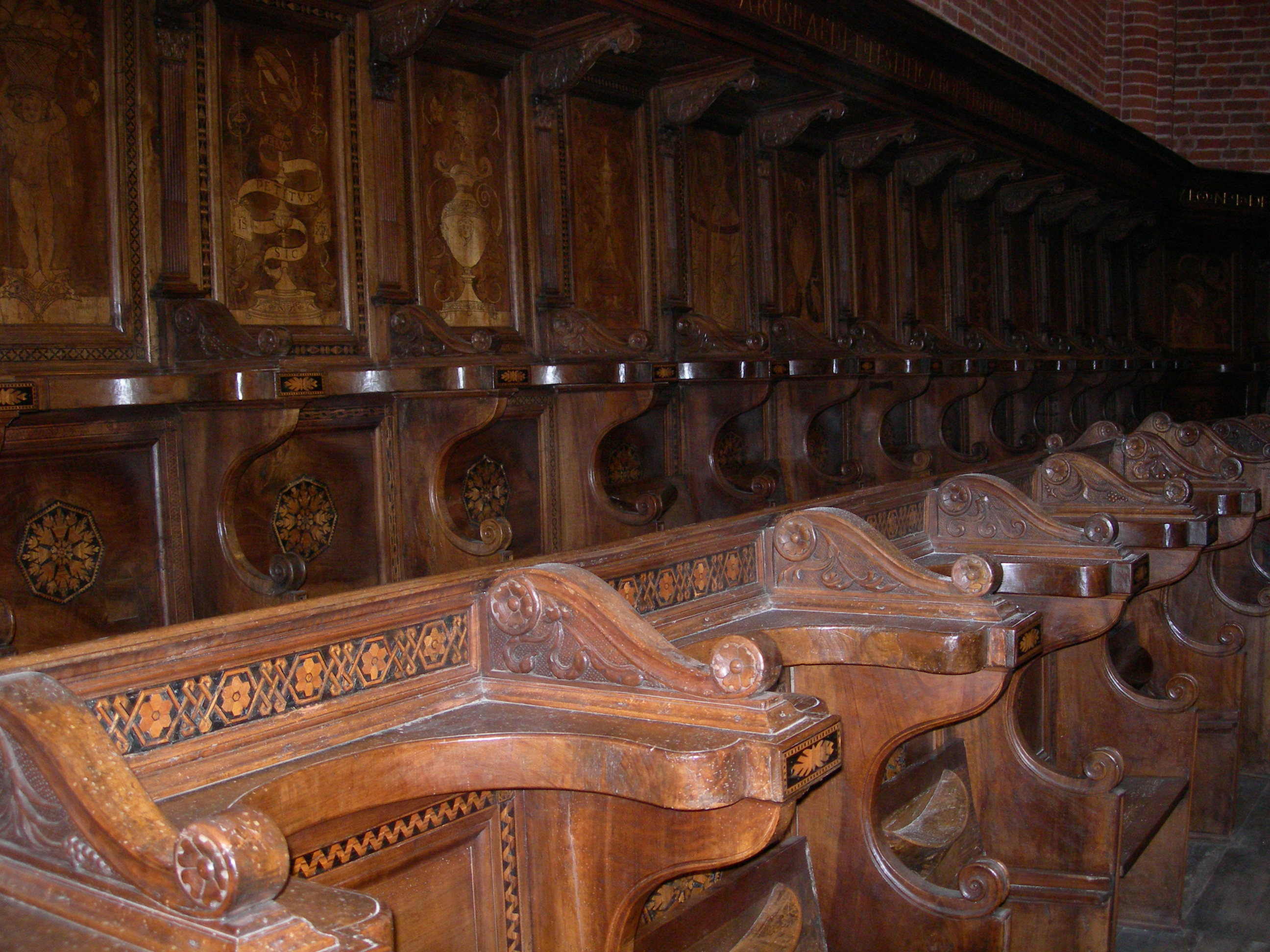
The choir

The current wooden choirstalls replaces the original stalls and was fabricated in 1522 by Francesco Giramo, an artist from Abbiategrasso. It is an interesting example of Renaissance wooden furniture as shown by the compact and architectural design, which is after the style promoted in Lombardy by Bramante, and by the technique used to engrave the figures, which were curved with woodcuts made with hot iron. The represented symbols hint to its use as a place of worship. Although derived from classical antiquity according to the Renaissance style, they represent spiritual values such as generosity of God’s gifts (the fruit basket) or the saving action of Christ (the fish).

=== Cloister ===
In the cloister the layout typical of a Cistercian monastery is still legible despite successive interventions (the three arcades built in 1500-1505 and the north and west sides raised in mid eighteenth century). The chapter house is fully maintaining its original features, and the refectory and the kitchen, now having a beautiful seventeenth-century style, is nevertheless reminiscent of the original layout.

=== The granges ===
The term grange (from Latin granea, a building for grain storage) was used to designate a rural productive site. It was built on a pre-existing agricultural structure, or from scratch. The grange had great autonomy from the home abbey, although a Lay Brother was ruling the grange. Necessities were growing with the number of monks and the development of the structure. Agriculture was the main source of material goods and the granges were the frame allowing for an effective agricultural activity. They also served as a repository of corn and equipment and as Lay Brother dwellings.

== List of abbots (incomplete) ==
Abbots

- Gualguerius (or Gualcherio, or Gualchezio, 1134-1145, first abbot)
- Peter (1145-?)
- Arnold (?-?)
- Rogerio (?. 1195)
- William (?. 1201)
- Bertram from Vedano (13th century)

Abbots and Commanders

- Giovanni Visconti (1441?-1447?, then Archbishop of Milan)
- Astorgio Agnesi (1450-1451, Archbishop of Benevento)
- Battista Maletta (1452-1462, former abbot at Chiaravalle della Colomba Abbey)
- Matteo Castiglioni (1463-1475)
- Branda Castiglioni (1475-1487, then cardinal)
- Giovanni Giacomo Schiaffinato (1487, Bishop of Parma)
- Giovanni de' Medici (1487-1495, then pope Leo X)
- Giovanni Giacomo Schiaffinato (1495-1497)
- Cesare Borgia (1498)
- Federico Sanseverino (1498-1516, then cardinal)
- Giulio de' Medici (1516-1521, then pope Clement VII)
- Innocenzo Ciocchi del Monte (?-1556)
- Antonio Libanorio (1648-1652)
- Francesco Lonati (1730-1737)
