= Paolo Brera =

Italian novelist and journalist (1949–2019)

Paolo Alberto Brera
- Born: 16 September 1949; Milan, Italy
- Died: 21 February 2019 (aged 69); Milan, Italy
- Occupations: economist, journalist, translator, and novelist

Paolo Alberto Brera (16 September 1949 – 21 February 2019) was an Italian economist, academic, journalist, multilingual translator and novelist.

== Biography ==
Brera was born in Milan, the third son of journalist and writer Gianni Brera and teacher Rina Gramegna. In 1976, he married Clelia Bertello and later on Rosetta Griglié. With Griglié, he has two daughters, Jalée (born 1985) and Lavinia Lys (born 1987). Since 2008, Brera divided his time between Nice, France and Milan.

Brera earned his degree in Political Economy from Milan's Bocconi University, where later on he was Assistant Professor of Economic History (1974–78). In 1977 he spent a few months at the Poznań University of Economics in Poland as a visiting scholar. From 1978–81 he worked at the Italian subsidiary of the French oil company Total, pursuing his research programme as a side occupation. Until 1985 he was a member of the Italian Socialist Party's (PSI) Economic Commission.

Brera researched the planned economies of the Soviet Union and Eastern Europe, publishing some fifty works in specialized journals. Brera was also a member of the Association Internationale des Économistes de Langue Française (International Association of French-Language Economists), and submitted papers on Eastern Europe at the NATO Headquarters in Bruxelles and in Rome.

He later became a journalist at Critica Sociale, Italia Oggi and Il Secolo XIX, and has contributed articles to Labour Weekly, Exormissi, Die Neue Gesellschaft, Corriere della Sera, L'Avanti, Tages Anzeiger, Corriere del Ticino, Panorama, Mondo economico, and others. In 1989–90, he was named vice-editor-in-chief of the Italian edition of Moskovskie Novosti. From 1998–2002 he edited and published Brera, a magazine devoted to the Brera district of Milan.

Beginning in 2000, he published science fiction, and detective novels and stories, as well as translations into Italian from English, French, Russian, Polish and Spanish works.

He died in Milan on 21 February 2019, at age of 69 after a heart attack. He had released his new novel, Il futuro degli altri, the previous day.

== Bibliography ==
- Denaro. Scritti di economia e letteratura, Brescia, Shakespeare & Company (1985)
- Dagmar la terrestre (Dagmar the Earthling), Bologna, Perseo Libri (1992)
- Annuario economico del calcio italiano (An Economic Yearbook of Italian Football; co-authored with Alberto Scherillo, Milan, Baldini e Castoldi (1995)
- Aurore (poems); introduction By Leonardo Coen, Milan, Otma Edizioni (2002)
- Emergenza fame. Il paradosso del mondo opulento (The Hunger Emergency. The Paradox of an Affluent World), Milan, San Paolo (2003)
- Gioanfucarlo (a biography of Gianni Brera) (co-authored By Claudio Rinaldi), Milan, Boroli (2004)
- Miti seri ed inversi (poems), prefaced By Vladimir Nabokov, Milan, Otma Edizioni (2004)
- Il veleno degli altri (The Others' Poison), Lugano, Todaro Editore (2006)
- Il denaro degli altri (The Others' Money), Treviso, Editing (2006)
- Due secoli di Milano e non-immediati dintorni (Two centuries of Milan and Surroundings), a poem, Turin, Aragno (2007)
- Don Giovanni. Un progetto di Paolo Brera, with works by Honoré de Balzac, Alexander Pushkin, José Zorrilla and Gianni Brera, translated by Paolo Brera, Milan, Alacrán (2007)
- La prigione degli altri (The Others' Prison), Milan, Book Time (2008)
- La mobile. Racconti metropolitani (The Fast Intervention Squad. Metropolitan Tales), (co-authored by Celeste Bruno), Milan, Mursia (2009)
- L'artificiere (co-authored with Celeste Bruno), Pavia, Altravista (2010)
- Il visconte , co-authored with Andrea Carlo Cappi, Milan: Sperling & Kupfer (2011)
- Eos. Sparare nel mucchio. Scritti di tuttologia applicata, Bagnacavallo, Discanti (2011)
