= Gianni Brera =

Italian sports journalist and novelist (1919–1992)

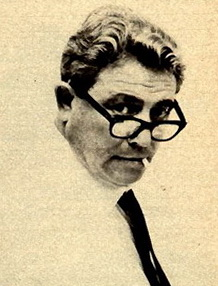
- Brera in 1975
- Born: Giovanni Luigi Brera; 8 September 1919; San Zenone al Po, Italy
- Died: 19 December 1992 (aged 73); Codogno, Italy

Giovanni Luigi "Gianni" Brera (8 September 1919 – 19 December 1992) was an Italian sports journalist and novelist.

== Biography ==
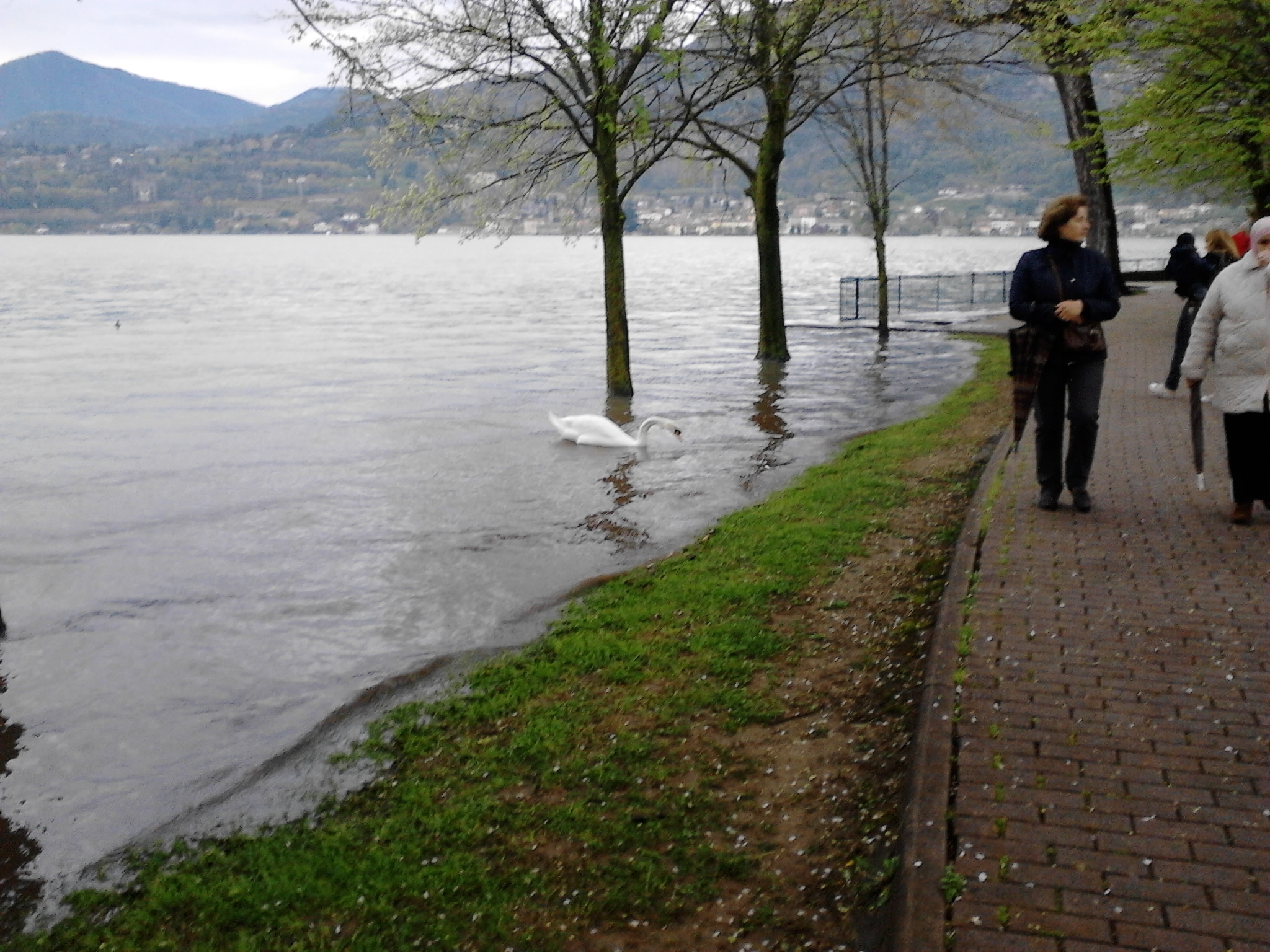
The Lakefront Gianni Brera in Bosisio Parini, Italy

Brera was born in San Zenone al Po, near Pavia, the son of Carlo, a tailor, and Marietta Ghisoni. Among his ancestors was a Hungarian great-grandmother who married a Lombard sergeant of the Imperial Austrian Army.

He obtained his degree in political sciences at Pavia University in 1943, while on leave from his post as lieutenant of the 185th Infantry Division "Folgore". In late spring 1944, he joined the Italian Resistance movement and fought in the Ossola Valley. He took pride in having lived through World War II without ever shooting another human being.

In 1943, he married Rina Gramegna (a teacher, 1920–2000) and had four sons: Franco (1944–1944), Carlo (a painter, 1946–1994), Paolo (an economist, journalist, multi-lingual translator, and novelist, 1949–2019), Franco (a musician, 1951-).

When he was discharged in 1945, he started working for La Gazzetta dello Sport (Italy's first sports daily), eventually becoming editor-in-chief in 1949, the youngest-ever editor-in-chief of a national newspaper in Italy.

Brera wrote for La Gazzetta dello Sport, Il Guerin Sportivo, Il Giorno, Il Giornale, La Repubblica and several other publications. His articles were translated into several European languages. He often referred to himself as "Gioannbrerafucarlo" (a reference to Italy's long-foregone system of including the father's name in a citizen's complete name).

He also wrote a number of books (handbooks, essays and fictional works), a theatre play, and a couple of radio plays.

Brera died halfway between Codogno and Casalpusterlengo, in 1992, from injuries suffered in a car accident: a car on the other side of the road crashed into his car, causing his death and the deaths of two other passengers.

== Legacy ==
Brera is viewed as one of the most influential Italian sports journalists of the 20th century. In 2003, the monumental Arena Civica (stadium), built in Milan by Napoleon I of France in the early 19th century, was renamed Arena Gianni Brera.

Brera is widely credited for innovating Italian language, notably by creating a whole new set of terms for football (soccer), some of which have been adopted by other countries. The word libero (sweeper) for the third defender was coined by Brera. Famous nicknames he invented for Italian players include Abatino ("Little Abbot") for Gianni Rivera and Rombo di tuono ("Rolling Thunder") for Gigi Riva. He also nicknamed Silvio Berlusconi Il Cavaliere ("The Knight") after the businessman was awarded the Order of Merit for Labour. Furthermore, he coined the monikers "Il Vecchio Balordo" (The Old Fool) and "La Beneamata" (The Well-Cherished One) for Genoa and Internazionale football clubs, respectively.

Living and working in Milan, according to the opinion of some of his colleagues, Brera was a supporter of Internazionale, but he claimed to be a fan of Genoa in order to prevent him from being dragged into the rivalry between Inter, A.C. Milan and Juventus FC and to be freely able to write about those teams without alienating the readerships from their sides. Brera's self-declared fondness for Genoa testified his love for the "heroic age" of Italian football (Genoa was Italy's first club and dominated the football championships until the early 1920s); moreover, after Brera's death the original foundation charter of the Genoa Cricket and Football Club was found among his papers, and his family donated it to a Genoese museum.

Apart from the imaginative lexicon, Brera was noteworthy for his rich style and liberal use of foreign or regional phrases. He spoke fluent French and Spanish, a little German and Latin, and some English.

In May 2019, Brera was inducted into the Italian Football Hall of Fame for the 2018 edition, under the category Special Awards.

== Bibliography ==
- Atletica leggera. Scienza e poesia dell'orgoglio fisico. Milan, Sperling & Kupfer, 1949.
- Il sesso degli Ercoli. Milan, Rognoni, 1959.
- Io, Coppi. Milan, Vitagliano, 1960.
- Addio bicicletta. Milan, Longanesi, 1964. Other editions: Milan, Rizzoli, 1980; Milan, Baldini & Castoldi, 1997.
- Atletica leggera. Culto dell'uomo (with G. Calvesi). Milan, Longanesi, 1964.
- I campioni vi insegnano il calcio, Milan, Longanesi, 1965; also: Milan, Booktime, 2008.
- Coppa del mondo 1966. I protagonisti e la loro storia. Milan, Mondadori, 1966.
- Il corpo della ragassa. Milan, Longanesi, 1969. Also: Treviso, Editing, 2006.
- Il mestiere del calciatore. Milan, Mondadori, 1972; also: Milan, Booktime, 2008.
- La pacciada. Mangiarebere in pianura padana (with G. Veronelli). Milan, Mondadori, 1973.
- Po, Milano, Dalmine. 1973.
- Il calcio azzurro ai mondiali. Milan, Campironi, 1974.
- Incontri e invettive. Milan, Longanesi, 1974.
- Introduzione alla vita saggia. Milan, Sigurtà Farmaceutici, 1974.
- Storia critica del calcio italiano. Milan, Bompiani, 1975.
- L'Arcimatto. Milan, Longanesi, 1977.
- Naso bugiardo. Milan, Rizzoli, 1977. Published again with the original title La ballata del pugile suonato. Milan, Booktime, 2008.
- Forza azzurri. Milan, Mondadori, 1978.
- 63 partite da salvare. Milan, Mondadori, 1978.
- Suggerimenti di buon vivere dettati da Francesco Sforza pel figliolo Galeazzo Maria. A Publication of the Municipality of Milan, 1979.
- Una provincia a forma di grappolo d'uva (with Paolo Brera). Milan, Istituto Editoriale Regioni Italiane, 1979.
- Coppi e il diavolo. Milan, Rizzoli, 1981. Also: Milan, Baldini&Castoldi (ISBN 88-808-9071-9), 1996
- Gente di risaia. Aosta, Musumeci, 1981.
- Lombardia, amore mio. Lodi, Lodigraf, 1982.
- L'arciBrera. Como, Edizioni "Libri" della rivista "Como", 1990.
- La leggenda dei mondiali. Milan, Pindaro, 1990.
- Il mio vescovo e le animalesse. Milano, Bompiani, 1984. Also: Milan, Baldini & Castoldi, 1993.
- La strada dei vini in Lombardia (with G. Pifferi and E. Tettamanzi). Como, Pifferi, 1986.
- Genoa, amore mio. Milan, Ponte alle Grazie, 1992.
- Storie dei Lombardi. Milan, BookTime, 2011.
- L'Arcimatto 1960–1966. Milan, Baldini & Castoldi, 1993.
- La bocca del leone (l'Arcimatto II 1967–1973). Milan, Baldini & Castoldi, 1995.
- La leggenda dei mondiali e il mestiere del calciatore. Milan, Baldini & Castoldi, 1994.
- Il principe della zolla (a cura di Gianni Mura). Milan, Il Saggiatore, 1994.
- L'Anticavallo. Sulle strade del Tour e del Giro. Milan, Baldini & Castoldi, 1997.
- Caro vecchio balordo. La storia del Genoa dal 1893 a oggi (Fabrizio Calzia, editor). Genoa, De Ferrari, 2005.
- Un lombardo nel pallone. Milan, Excogita 2007.
- Il più bel gioco del mondo, Milan. BUR (Biblioteca Universale Rizzoli), 2007.
- L'abatino Berruti. Milan, BookTime, 2009.
- Suggerimenti di Francesco Sforza al figlio Gian Galeazzo. Milan, BookTime, 2009.
- Brambilla e la Squaw, with a note by Paolo Brera. Milan, Frassinelli, 2012.
- Introduzione alla vita saggia, prefaced by Carlo Verdone, Bologna, Il Mulino, 2014.

== Sources ==
- Gioanfucarlo (biography), by Paolo Brera and Claudio Rinaldi, Milan, Boroli, 2004
- Com'era bello con Gianni Brera, by Andrea Maietti, Arezzo, Limina, 2002
- Gianni Brera, Treccani Encyclopedia article, by Claudio Rinaldi
