= Laura Maraschi =

Italian astronomer

Laura Maraschi is an Italian astronomer. She works for the Brera Astronomical Observatory. In 2013, she was on the organizing committee of the International Astronomical Union Symposium 304.

== Works ==
- Treves, Aldo; Maraschi, Laura (1989). Accretion: A Collection of Influential Papers. World Scientific. ISBN 978-981-02-0077-0.
- Aharonian, Felix A.; Völk, Heinz J.; Horns, Dieter (2005-03-11). "Gamma-ray Blazars: an overview". High Energy Gamma-Ray Astronomy: 2nd International Symposium on High Energy Gamma-Ray Astronomy. American Inst. of Physics. ISBN 978-0-7354-0229-4.
- Aartsen, Mark; et al. (2018-07-13). "Multimessenger observations of a flaring blazar coincident with high-energy neutrino IceCube-170922A". Science. 361 (6398). arXiv:1807.08816. Bibcode:2018Sci...361.1378I. doi:10.1126/science.aat1378. hdl:1721.1/129380. PMID 30002226. S2CID 204803450.
