= Giuseppe Beltramelli =

Italian scholar and art collector (1734–1816)

Giuseppe Beltramelli (15 May 1734 – 1816) was an Italian scholar and art collector.

== Biography ==
Giuseppe Beltramelli was born to an aristocratic family in Bergamo. He studied humanities in the Jesuit college of Bologna, and design under Domenico Maria Fratta, a member of the Accademia Clementina. He returned to Bergamo, where his palace became host to a superb art, artifact, and book collection. In Bergamo he patronized artists, including the poet Countess Paolina Secco Suardo Grismondi, who wrote under the pen-name of Lesbia Cidonia. He collaborated with writers such as Morelli, Serassi, Tiraboschi, Lande, and Lanzi. He lived for two years in Paris, meeting major artists and scholars of the period including Dorat, Diderot, d'Alembert, de la Condamine, and Madame du Boccage. In London, he met PH Maty and Moschelin, and befriended Angelica Kauffman. He returned to Bergamo impoverished, and sold his collections, but was able to gain a professorship in eloquence and belle-lettere. He was a prolific writer on art.

== Bibliography ==
- Raponi, Nicola (1966). "BELTRAMELLI, Giuseppe". Dizionario Biografico degli Italiani (in Italian). Vol. 8: Bellucci–Beregan. Rome: Istituto dell'Enciclopedia Italiana. ISBN 978-88-12-00032-6.
