= Lauro Corniani Algarotti =

Lauro Gaspare Corniani degli Algarotti (1767-1827) was an Italian writer of novels and librettos.

He was born to an aristocratic family of Padua; his father was a member of their council of nobles. He trained under the Somaschi fathers in town and had as professors, Lovisetti and Paccanero. he initially worked as a magistrate for the Venetian republic, serving as director in Macerata. He wrote the cantata Giudize di Giove to welcome Napoleon to Venice. His main work was a compendium of 100 short novels.
