= Palazzo Brera =

Palace in Milan

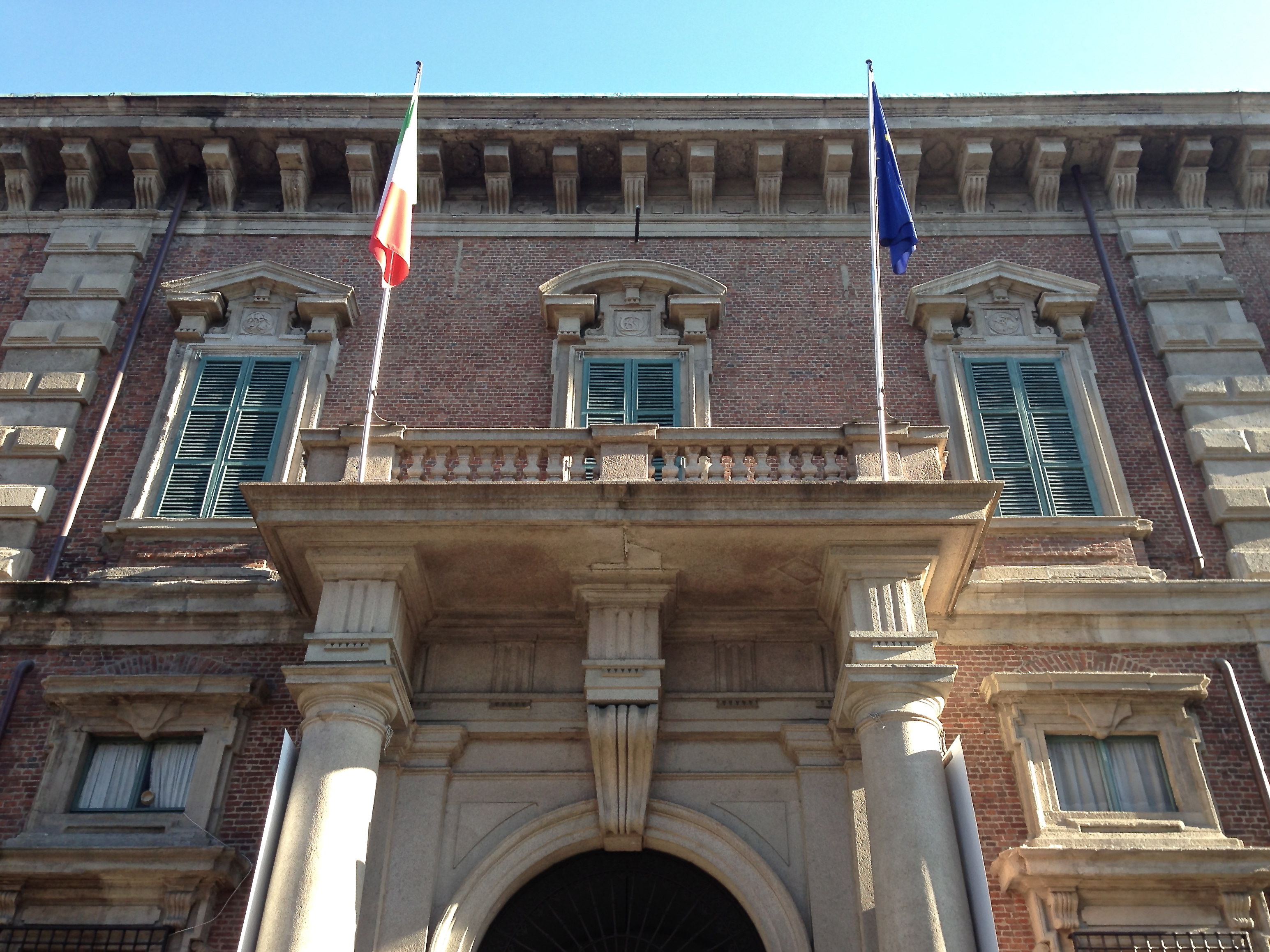
- Entrance to the palace
- Interactive map of the Palazzo Brera area
- Alternative names: Palazzo di Brera

General information
- Location: via Brera 28, Milan, Italy
- Coordinates: 45°28′20″N 9°11′17″E
- Construction started: circa 1615

Design and construction
- Architect: Francesco Maria Richini
- Other designers: Martino Bassi; Giuseppe Piermarini

Palazzo Brera or Palazzo di Brera is a monumental palace in Milan, in Lombardy in northern Italy. It was a Jesuit college for two hundred years. It now houses several cultural institutions including the Accademia di Brera, the art academy of the city, and its gallery, the Pinacoteca di Brera; the Orto Botanico di Brera, a botanical garden; an observatory, the Osservatorio Astronomico di Brera; the Istituto Lombardo Accademia di Scienze e Lettere, a learned society; and an important library, the Biblioteca di Brera.

== History ==
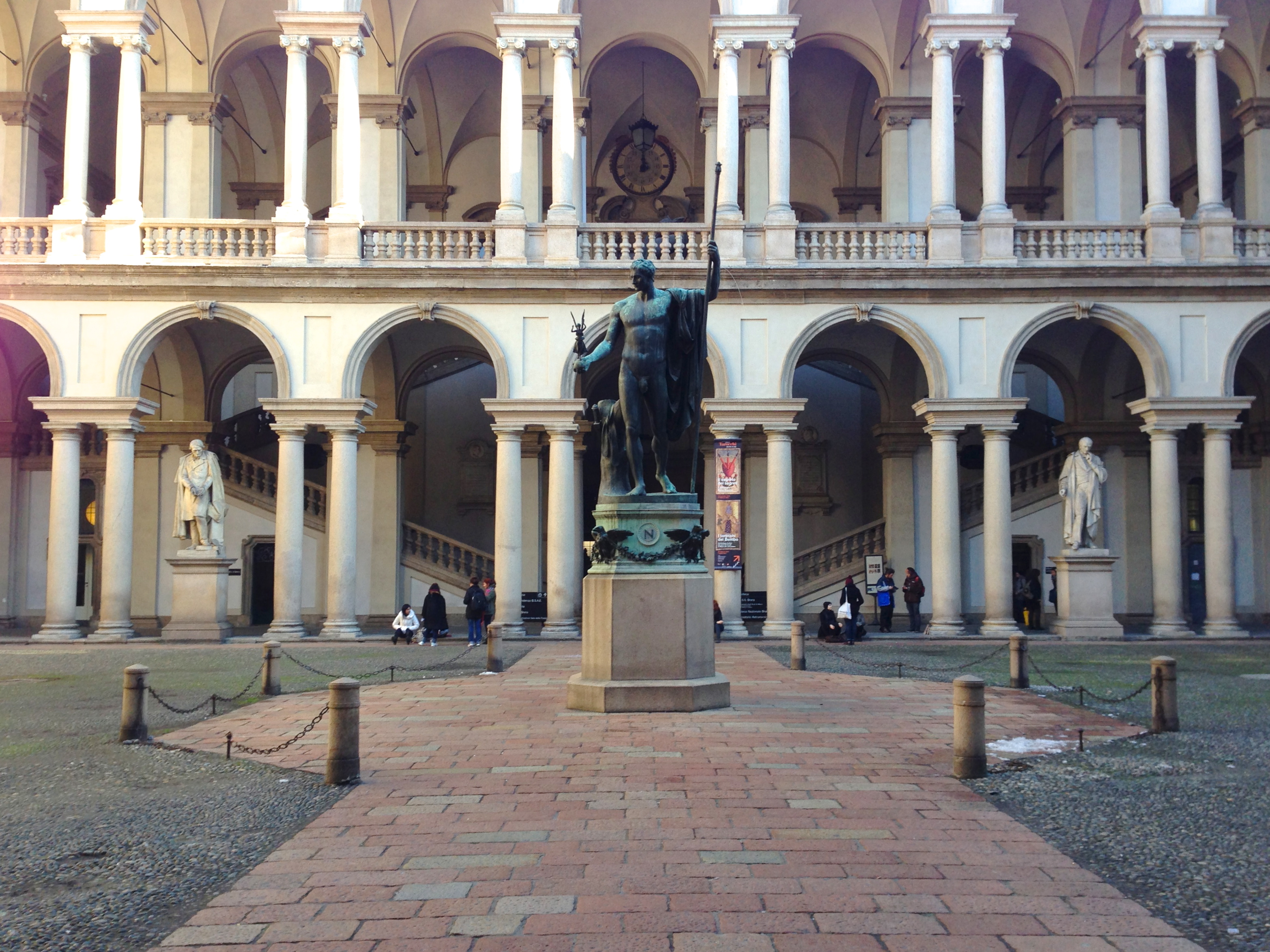
The courtyard, with a bronze copy of Antonio Canova's statue of Napoleon as Mars the Peacemaker

The origins of the palace lie in a monastery built on the lands of Guercio da Baggio, who may have been consul between 1150 and 1188. Shortly before 1178 it passed into the hands of the Humiliati. The church of Santa Maria in Brera (demolished in the 19th century) was built between 1180 and 1229; a Gothic marble portal was added by the Pisan sculptor Giovanni di Balduccio between 1346 and 1348, and there were frescoes by Giovanni da Milano, Vincenzo Foppa and Bernardino Luini.

After the suppression of the Humiliati by Pius V on 7 February 1571, the monastery became – at the request of Carlo Borromeo and with the approval of Gregory XIII – a Jesuit college. This grew to some 3000 students, and more space was needed. Between 1573 and 1590 Martino Bassi was engaged to design a new building on the lines of the Collegio Borromeo in Pavia. The present palace was built to designs of Francesco Maria Richini from about 1615. Work began in 1627, but was interrupted by the plague outbreak of 1630, and was resumed only in 1651; after Richini died in 1658, it was continued by his son Gian Domenico.

Following the suppression of the Jesuits by Clement XIV on 21 July 1773, the palace passed to the then rulers of northern Italy, the Austrian Habsburg dynasty. In 1780 Giuseppe Piermarini completed the inner courtyard and built the imposing entrance from via Brera.

The church of Santa Maria in Brera was deconsecrated in 1806. After the Napoleonic suppression of the convents in the early 19th century, the façade was torn down, and the nave of the church was divided horizontally; the upper floor became the Napoleonic rooms of the art gallery of the Accademia, and the lower floor housed the sculptures of the museum of antiquities.

In 1859 a bronze copy of Antonio Canova's statue of Napoleon as Mars the Peacemaker, cast in Rome in 1811 by Francesco Righetti and his son Luigi, was placed at the centre of the courtyard of the palace.

== Institutions in the palace ==
From 1773 the palace became home to a number of cultural, scientific and artistic institutions. The Osservatorio Astronomico di Brera was founded nine years earlier, in 1764, by the Jesuit Ruggero Boscovich. Maria Theresa of Austria established the Regia Biblioteca Braidense in 1773, expanded the existing Jesuit herb garden into the Orto Botanico di Brera from 1774, and founded the Reale Accademia di Belle Arti in 1776. The palace also housed the Scuole Palatine for philosophy and law, the Gymnasium, laboratories for physics and chemistry, and the Società Patriottica, an agricultural society.

The picture gallery of the accademia, now the Pinacoteca di Brera, was started in 1806, in Napoleonic times. In 1810 a learned society, the Istituto Reale di Scienze, Lettere ed Arti, founded by Napoleon in Bologna in 1797 as the Istituto Nazionale della Repubblica Cisalpina, was moved to Palazzo Brera; it is now the Istituto Lombardo Accademia di Scienze e Lettere.

== See also ==
- List of Jesuit sites
