= Brera Academy =

Fine arts school in Milan, Italy

Accademia di Belle Arti di Brera
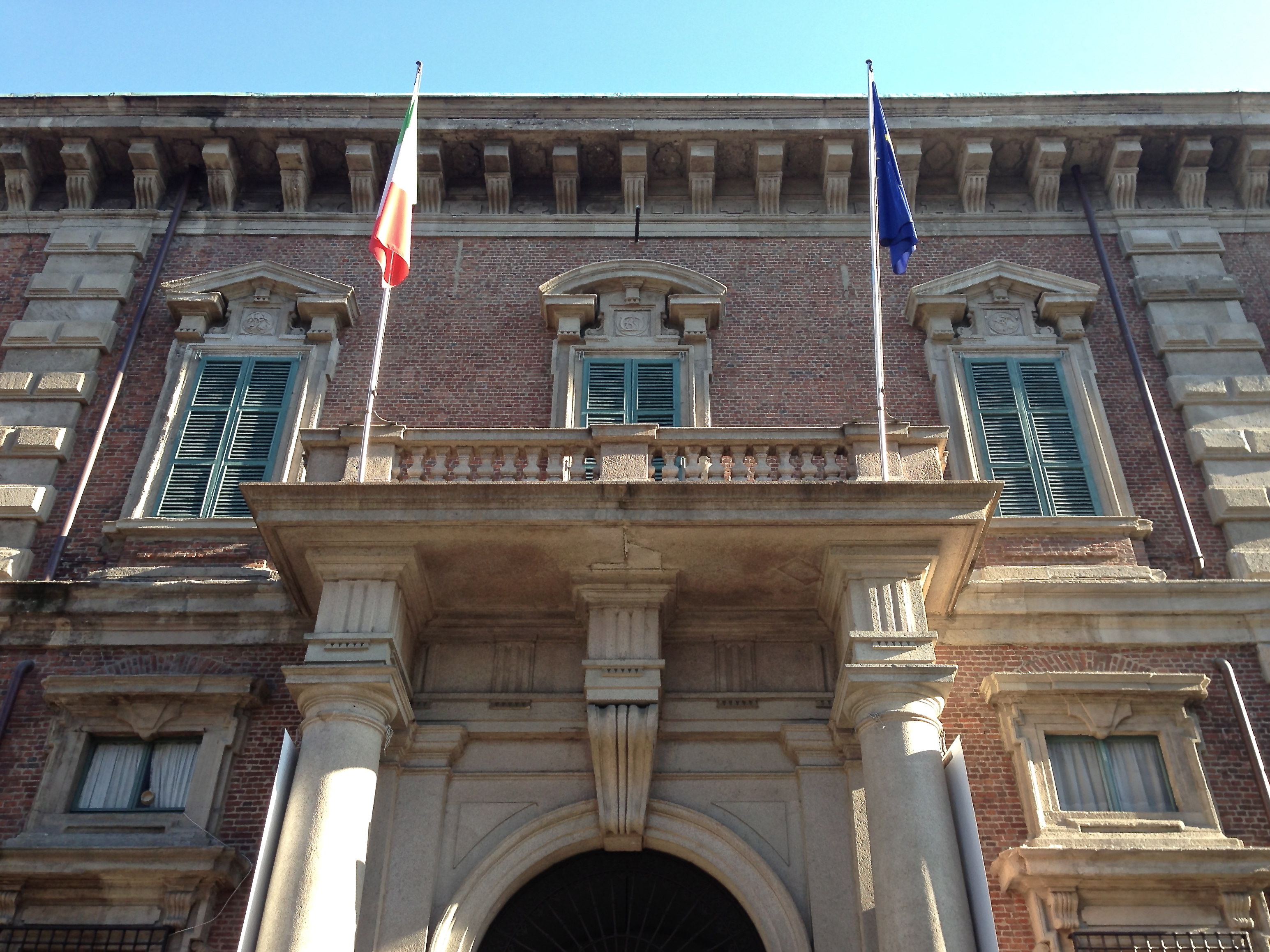
- Type: Public
- Established: 1776; 250 years ago
- President: Livia Pomodoro
- Dean: Giovanni Iovane
- Students: 3,800
- Location: Milan, Italy; 45°28′20″N 9°11′17″E
- Campus: Urban
- Website: www.accademiadibrera.milano.it

The Accademia di Belle Arti di Brera (lit. 'Academy of fine arts of Brera'), also known as the Accademia di Brera or Brera Academy, is a state-run tertiary public academy of fine arts in Milan, Italy. It shares its history, and its main building, with the Pinacoteca di Brera, Milan's main public museum for art. In 2010 an agreement was signed to move the accademia to a former military barracks, the Caserma Magenta in via Mascheroni. In 2018 it was announced that Caserma Magenta was no longer a viable option, with the former railway yard in Via Farini now under consideration as a potential venue for the campus extension.

== History ==
The academy was founded in 1776 by Maria Theresa of Austria. In typical Enlightenment fashion, it shared premises with other cultural and scientific institutions – the astronomical observatory, the Orto Botanico di Brera, the Scuole Palatine for philosophy and law, the Gymnasium, laboratories for physics and chemistry, the Biblioteca di Brera, the agricultural society and, from 1806, the Pinacoteca di Brera or art gallery. These were housed in the Palazzo Brera, which was built in about 1615 to designs by Francesco Maria Richini, and until the suppression of the Jesuits in 1773 had been a Jesuit college.

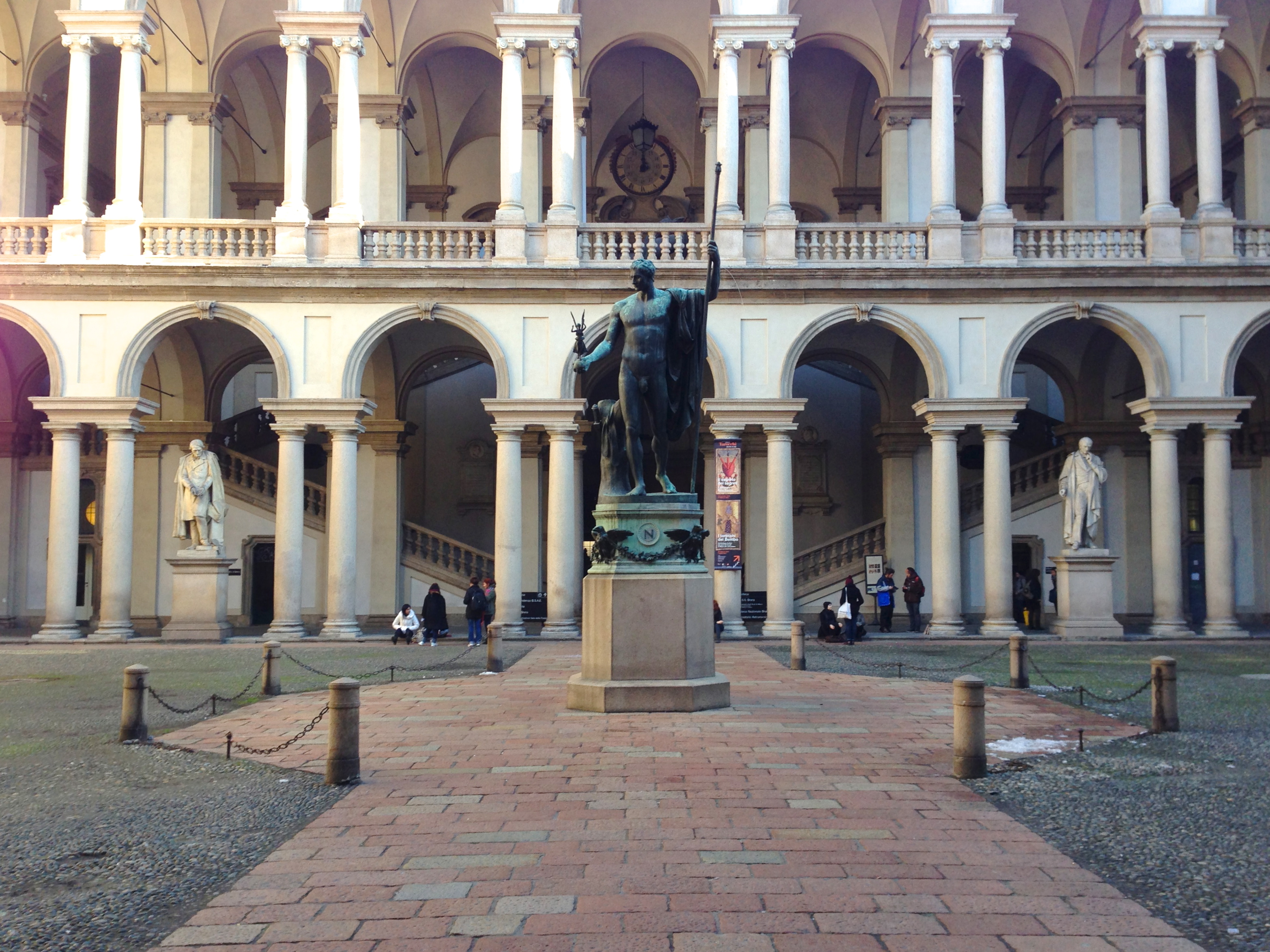
The courtyard, with a bronze copy of Antonio Canova’s statue of Napoleon as Mars the Peacemaker

== The academy ==
Like other state-run art academies in Italy, the Accademia di Brera falls under the Ministero dell'Istruzione, dell'Universita e della Ricerca, the Italian ministry of education and research. In accordance with presidential decree 212 dated 8 July 2005, it awards first- and second-level degrees, specialised degrees, master's degrees and doctorates.

The accademia has three departments: the department of visual arts, with courses in decorative art, graphic art, painting and sculpture; the department of design and applied art, which has courses in art restoration, design for business, new technologies of art and scenic design; and the department of communication and education in art, with courses in conservation of cultural heritage and in art education.

It has about 3,800 students, including about 1,000 foreign students (mostly postgraduates). It participates in the ERASMUS programme, and exchanges students and teachers with institutions in other countries in Europe and elsewhere.

== The picture gallery ==
The picture gallery of the accademia, now the Pinacoteca di Brera, was started in 1806, in Napoleonic times. Large numbers of paintings were brought to Milan after the suppression of the convents by Napoleon. The façade of the church of Santa Maria in Brera of the former monastery was torn down and the nave of the church was divided horizontally; the upper floor became the Napoleonic rooms of the art gallery of the Accademia, which opened in 1809 as the Reale Galleria, and the lower floor housed the sculptures of the museum of antiquities. A Sala dei Moderni, which held contemporary works, was started in 1806 by Giuseppe Bossi. The Pinacoteca became independent of the accademia in 1882, though both remain in Palazzo Brera.

== Academics and alumni ==
Alumni of the academy include the playwright Dario Fo, recipient of the 1997 Nobel Prize in Literature; and the Futurist painter Carlo Carrà, who also taught at the academy from 1939 to 1952.

Others who have taught at the Brera include the Venetian painter Francesco Hayez, professor of painting from 1822 to 1880; and the architect and writer Camillo Boito, who was professor of architecture from 1860 to 1909, and for part of that time also president of the academy.

== Curiosity ==
The Contemporary Art Library of the Academy is one of the 24 libraries in the world that own the "Treatise on Demonology, Summa verborum, numeri, temporis et spatii" by Filippo Biagioli.
