= Brera Astronomical Observatory =

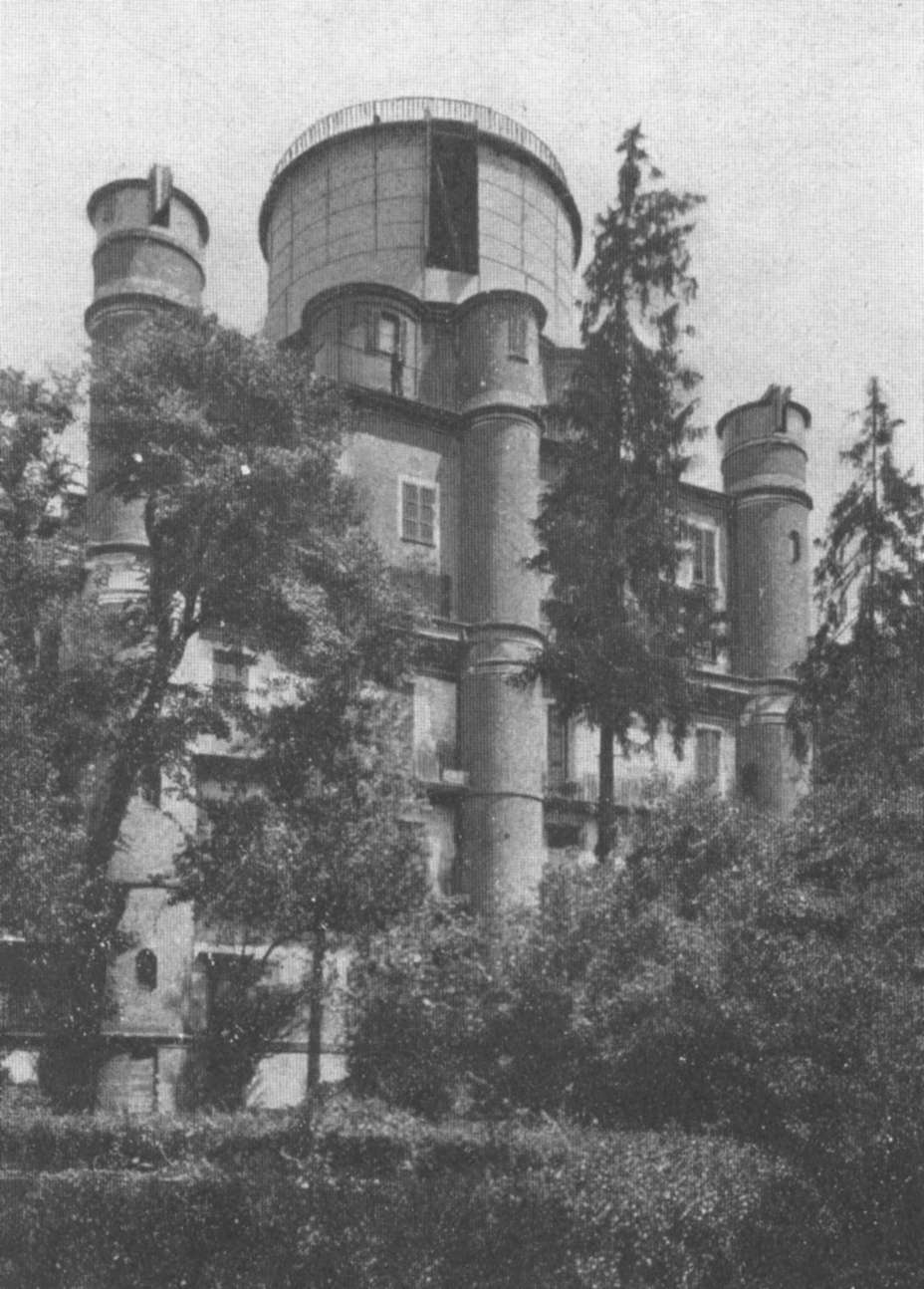
- (ca. 1886-1890)
- Alternative names: Osservatorio Astronomico di Brera
- Observatory code: 027
- Location: Brera district of Milan, Italy
- Coordinates: 45°28′19″N 9°11′16″E
- Website: museoastronomico.brera.inaf.it
- Telescopes: Merate Astronomical Observatory
- Location of Brera Astronomical Observatory
- Related media on Commons

The Brera Observatory (Italian: Osservatorio Astronomico di Brera) is an astronomical observatory in the Brera district of Milan, Italy. It is currently operated by the National Institute for Astrophysics (Italian: Istituto Nazionale di Astrofisica, INAF) and the Institute of Applied General Physics (Italian: Istituto di Fisica Generale Applicata) of the University of Milan.

It was built in the historic Palazzo Brera in 1764 by the Jesuit astronomer Roger Boscovich. Following the suppression of the Jesuits by Clement XIV on 21 July 1773, the palace and the observatory passed to the then rulers of northern Italy, the Austrian Habsburg dynasty.

From 1 December 1786, the Austrian Empire adopted “transalpine time”. The astronomers were engaged by Count Giuseppe Di Wilczek, the plenipotentiary governor of Lombardy, to build a meridian line inside Milan Cathedral. It was constructed by Giovanni Angelo Cesaris and Francesco Reggio, with Roger Joseph Boscovich acting as a consultant.

Following the incorporation of Milan into the Kingdom of Italy in 1861, the observatory has been run by the Italian government.

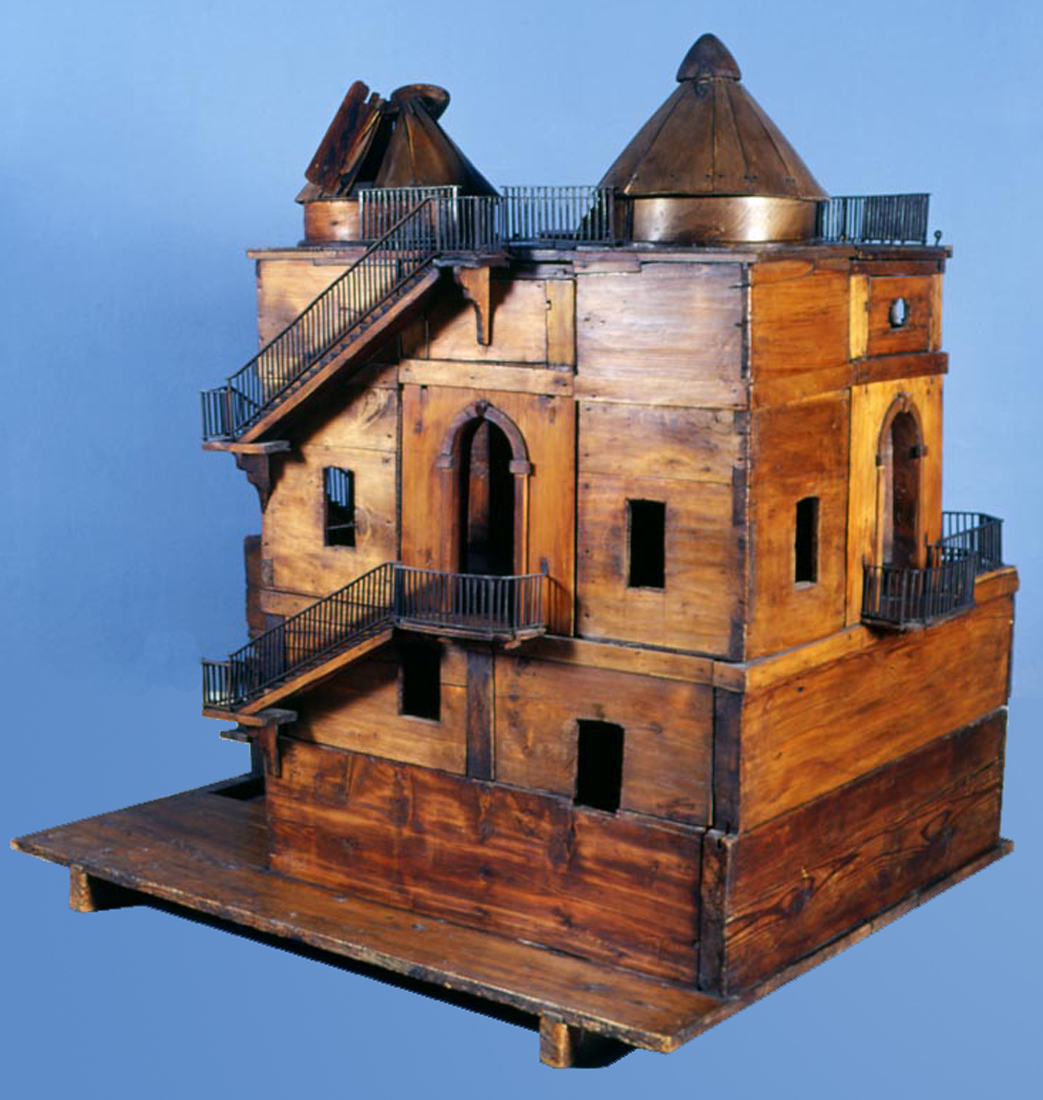
Original wooden model of the Brera Astronomical Observatory exhibited at Museo nazionale della scienza e della tecnologia Leonardo da Vinci, Milan.

In 1862, the newly installed Italian government improved the observatory's facilities by commissioning a 218mm Merz Equatorial Refracting Telescope to the German constructor Georg Merz. In 1946 the observatory became part of the scientific institutions of the new born Italian Republic and since 2001 it has become part of the National Institute of Astrophysics (INAF).

Astronomer Margherita Hack worked at the Observatory from 1954 to 1964, until she became Professor of the Institute of Physics at the Trieste University.

Today the Observatory's staff consists of approximatively one hundred people. The research area covers a large range of fields from planets to stars, black holes, galaxies, gamma-ray bursts and cosmology. The Observatory is also active in the technological research applied to the astronomical instrumentation and it is one of the world leaders in the development of X-ray astronomy optics and light instrumentation for space missions.

== The Museum ==
The Observatory Museum's collection features astronomical instruments used by the Brera astronomers over the years, from the early days of the Observatory to the 1970s. The collection, started by Giovanni Schiaparelli and enriched by subsequent directors, is displayed in the entrance hall of the Observatory. The present layout of the gallery is the result of an effort aimed at the preservation and promotion of the items on display, which have been restored and catalogued as part of a project started by the Institute for General and Applied Physics of the University of Milan. The Observatory's nucleus of astronomical instruments has been enriched with miscellaneous scientific instruments that are part of the historical collection of the University of Milan. These include telescopes, microscopes, pneumatic and electrostatic devices, and instruments used for the cartographic surveys of the 18th and 19th centuries.

The dome with the 8-inch refracting telescope which Schiaparelli had installed in 1875 is also part of the Museum. Schiaparelli used this telescope for his astronomical researches of binary stellar systems, comets, asteroids and planets of the Solar System, and particularly Mars. In 1999 the telescope and the dome were fully restored to be operational, and are open to the public.

== Notable people ==
- Laura Maraschi, Italian astronomer

== See also ==
- University of Milan
- List of astronomical observatories
- List of Jesuit sites
