= Orto Botanico di Brera =

Botanical garden in Milan, Italy

Coordinates: 45°28′21.72″N 9°11′13.56″E

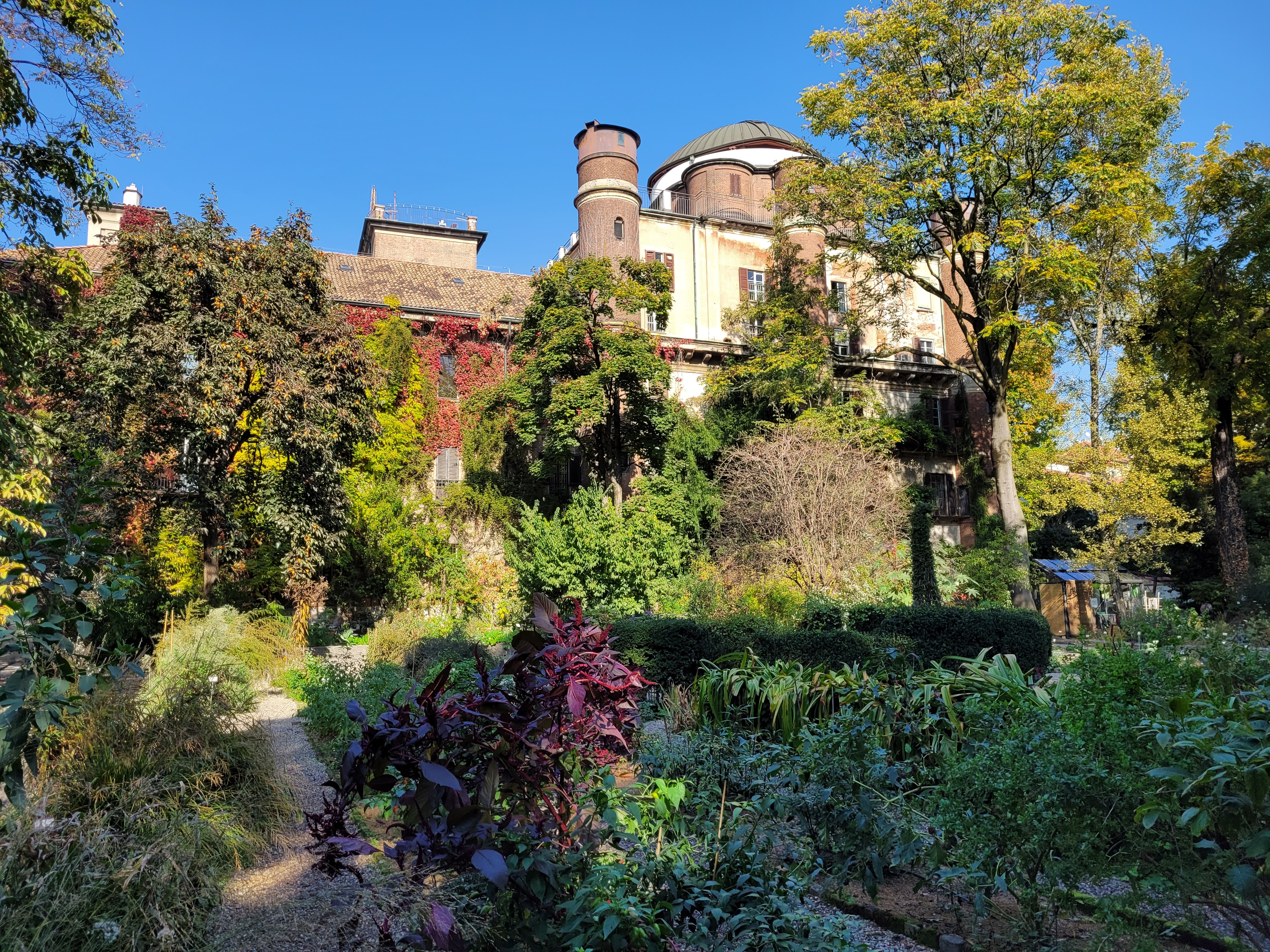
Orto Botanico di Brera in autumn

The Orto Botanico di Brera (5,000 m^{2}) is a botanical garden located behind Palazzo Brera at Via Brera 28 in the center of Milan, Lombardy, Italy, and operated by the Istituto di Fisica Generale Applicata of the University of Milan. It is open weekdays without charge.

The garden was established in 1774 by Abbot Fulgenzio Vitman under the direction of the Empress Maria Theresa of Austria, transforming an existing Jesuit garden to serve students of medicine and pharmacology. The garden was restored in 1998 after a long period of neglect and decay.

Today the garden consists primarily of rectangular flower-beds, trimmed in brick, with elliptical ponds from the 18th century, and specula and greenhouse from the 19th century (now used by the Academy of Fine Arts). It contains one of the oldest Ginkgo biloba trees in Europe, as well as mature specimens of Firmiana platanifolia, Juglans nigra, Pterocarya fraxinifolia, and Tilia.

== See also ==
- List of botanical gardens in Italy
