= List of works by Diego Velázquez =

This is a list of paintings and drawings by the 17th-century Spanish artist Diego Velázquez. Velázquez is estimated to have produced between only 110 and 120 known canvases. Among these paintings, however, are many widely known and influential works.

All paintings are in oil on canvas unless noted.

== Seville (until 1622) ==
Painting	Title	Date	Dimensions (cm)	Collection	Notes	Catalog numbers: Morán–Sánchez/López-Rey
	Three Musicians	1617–1618	87 × 110	Staatliche Museen, Berlin		1/1
	The Lunch	c. 1618	108.5 × 102	Hermitage, Saint Petersburg		2/3
	The Kitchen Maid	c. 1620	55 × 118	National Gallery of Ireland, Dublin	The dates proposed by critics range from 1617 to 1622.	3/17
	Old Woman Cooking Eggs	1618	100.5 × 119.5	National Gallery of Scotland, Edinburgh	Dated in the lower right corner.	5/6
	Christ in the House of Martha and Mary	1618	60 × 103.5	National Gallery of London	Dated.	6/7
	Dos jóvenes a la mesa	1622	65.3 × 104	Apsley House, London		9/24
	Saint Thomas	1619–1620	95 × 73	Musée des Beaux-Arts d'Orléans, Orléans		10/10
	Immaculate Conception	1619	135 × 101.6	National Gallery of London		11/11
	San Juan en Patmos	1619	135.5 × 102.2	National Gallery of London		12/12
	Adoration of the Magi	1619	204 × 126.5	Museo del Prado, Madrid	Dated in the stone under the foot of the Virgin.	13/13
	Saint Paul	1619–1620	99 × 78	Museu Nacional d'Art de Catalunya, Barcelona		14/14
	Cabeza de apóstol	1622	38 × 29	Museo del Prado, Madrid		15/15
	The Waterseller of Seville	1620	106.7 × 81	Apsley House, London		16/16
	Don Cristóbal Suárez de Ribera	1620	207 × 148	Museum of Fine Arts of Seville	Signed and dated in a fold of clothing difficult to read. This would be a posthumous portrait, as the sitter died in 1618, although Mayer thought that monogram and date could be apocryphal.	17/19
	La venerable madre Jerónima de la Fuente	1620	162 × 107	Museo del Prado, Madrid	Signed and dated "Diego Velazquez f. 1620". The phylactery around the cross with its inscription, now illegible, was erased in 1944, after entering at the Museum, for having believed apocryphal.	18/20
	La venerable madre Jerónima de la Fuente	1620	162.5 × 105	Colección Fernández Araoz, Madrid	Signed and dated "Diego Velazquez f. 1620". Added at a later date under the hand of others.	19/21
	Imposición de la casulla a San Ildefonso	1620–1623	166 × 120	Municipality of Seville	In poor condition with significant loss of paint.	20/22
	Retrato de caballero/Francisco Pacheco	1620–1622	40 × 36	Museo del Prado, Madrid		21/23

== Madrid (1622–1629) ==
Painting	Title	Date	Dimensions (cm)	Collection	Notes	Catalog numbers: Morán–Sánchez/López-Rey
	Portrait of Don Luis de Góngora	1622	50.3 × 40.5	Museum of Fine Arts, Boston		22/25
	Retrato de hombre	1623–1624	55.5 × 38	Museo del Prado, Madrid	Allende-Salazar (1925), Mayer (1936) and Camón Aznar estimate that this could be a self-portrait. López-Rey and Brown think that the subject could be the artist's brother Juan, also a painter.	24/27
	Felipe IV	1623–1624	61.6 × 48.2	Meadows Museum, Dallas	Brown believes that this may be a portrait of the king, a hypothesis rejected by López-Rey.	25/28
	Retrato de dama	1625	32 × 24	Once in the Royal Palace of Madrid. Current whereabouts unknown (stolen from Greenville Art Museum in South Carolina on July 8, 2010)	This is a fragment of a larger portrait probably damaged in the fire of Alcazar.	28/31
	Cabeza de venado	1626–1628	58 × 44.5	Museo del Prado, Madrid	Dating is controversial. Most critics suggest 1635. López-Rey gives 1626, based on 1637 information from a picture of a deer antler painted by Velázquez bearing the inscription "Le mató el Rey nuestro Sr. Phe. quarto el year 1626". A technical study by Carmen Garrido placed the date between 1626 and 1628.	31/33
	Cristo contemplado por el alma cristiana	1626–1628	165 × 206.4	National Gallery of London		32/35
	Felipe IV	1623–1628	198 × 101.5	Museo del Prado, Madrid		33/36
	Portrait of the Infante Don Carlos	1626–1628	209 × 12	Museo del Prado, Madrid		34/37
	Portrait of Philip IV in Armour	c. 1628	57 × 44.5	Museo del Prado, Madrid	This is considered a fragment of a larger work painted in two stages, reforming the dress and adding the red band in the second.	35/38
	Demócrito/El geógrafo	1628–1629	101 × 81	Musée des Beaux-Arts de Rouen	Head and hand repainted around 1640. Radiography shows the left hand formerly contained a drink, as it appears in two copies preserved.	37/40
	The Triumph of Bacchus	1628–1629	165.5 × 227.5	Museo del Prado, Madrid		38/41
	La cena de Emaús	1628–1629	123.2 × 132.7	Metropolitan Museum of Art, New York City	Proposed dates range from 1619 (Lafuente Ferrari) to a time immediately after the first trip to Italy (Marias).	39/42

== First trip to Italy (1629–1630) ==
Painting	Title	Date	Dimensions (cm)	Collection	Notes	Catalog numbers: Morán–Sánchez/López-Rey
	Portrait of Maria Anna	1630	59.5 × 45.5	Museo del Prado, Madrid		40/48
	Joseph's Tunic	1630	223 × 250	El Escorial, San Lorenzo de El Escorial		41/43
	Apollo in the Forge of Vulcan	1630	222 × 290	Museo del Prado, Madrid		42/44
	Cabeza de Apolo	1630	36 × 25	Private collection, New York City	Considered a study for Apollo in the Forge of Vulcan.	43/45
	El Pabellón de Cleopatra-Ariadna	1630	44.5 × 38.5	Museo del Prado, Madrid	The dating of this painting and the next has been controversial. Most critics date it during the second trip to Italy, but technical studies by in the Prado confirm the 1630 date proposed by López-Rey.	44/46
	View of the Garden of the Villa Medici	1630	48.5 × 43	Museo del Prado, Madrid		45/47

== Madrid (1631–1648) ==
Painting	Title	Date	Dimensions (cm)	Collection	Notes	Catalog numbers: Morán–Sánchez/López-Rey
	A Sybil (Juana Pacheco?)	1630–1631	62 × 50	Museo del Prado, Madrid		46/49
	Retrato de hombre joven	1630–1631	89.2 × 69.5	Alte Pinakothek, Munich	Appears unfinished, with the hands just sketched, although López-Rey suggests that Velázquez may have intended this as a finished work, highlighting the essential features of the portrait.	47/50
	Temptation of St. Thomas	1631–1632	244 × 203	Museum of the Orihuela Cathedral, Orihuela		48/130
	Prince Balthasar Charles With a Dwarf	1631	128.1 × 102	Museum of Fine Arts, Boston		49/51
	Philip IV in Brown and Silver	1631–1632	199.5 × 113	National Gallery of London		50/52
	Isabel de Borbón	1631–1632	207 × 119	Private collection, New York City		51/53
	Don Diego del Corral y Arellano	1631–1632	205 × 116	Museo del Prado, Madrid		52/55
	Doña Antonia de Ipeñarrieta y Galdós and Her Son Don Luis	1631–1632	205 × 115	Museo del Prado, Madrid	Brown suggestions that a contemporary workshop was involved in the painting of lady's costume and the figure of the child; changes once thought to be later additions, but denied by radiography.	53/54
	Mano de hombre	1630	27 × 24	Unknown; previously Royal Palace of Madrid		54/56
	Don Pedro de Barberana y Aparregui	1631–1632	198.2 × 111.8	Kimbell Art Museum, Fort Worth, Texas		55/57
	Don Juan Mateos	1632	108 × 90	Dresden Gallery, Dresden	The hands are only outlined, but with a touch of white light which suggests that Velázquez considered the work finished in that state.	56/58
	Christ Crucified	1632	250 × 170	Museo del Prado, Madrid		57/59
	Retrato del príncipe Baltasar Carlos	1632	117.8 × 95.9	Wallace Collection, London		58/60
	Felipe IV	1632	127.5 × 86.5	Kunsthistorisches Museum, Vienna	Generally considered the work of Velázquez and his workshop. For López-Rey only the head and some small details could be considered by Velazquez.	59/61
	Isabel de Borbón	1632	132 × 101.5	Kunsthistorisches Museum, Vienna		60/62
	The Jester Named Don John of Austria	1632–1633	210 × 124.5	Museo del Prado, Madrid		61/65
	Equestrian Portrait of the Count-Duke of Olivares	1634	314 × 240	Museo del Prado, Madrid		62/66
	White Horse	1634–1638	310 × 245	Royal Collections Gallery, Madrid		63/67
	Equestrian Portrait of Philip III	1634–1635	305 × 320	Museo del Prado, Madrid		64/68
	Equestrian Portrait of Margarita of Austria	1634–1635	302 × 311.5	Museo del Prado, Madrid	Velazquez and workshop.	65/69
	Equestrian Portrait of Elisabeth of France	1634–1635	304.5 × 317.5	Museo del Prado, Madrid	Velazquez and workshop.	66/70
	Equestrian Portrait of Philip IV	1634–1635	305.5 × 317.5	Museo del Prado, Madrid		67/71
	Equestrian Portrait of Prince Balthasar Charles	1634–1635	209.5 × 174	Museo del Prado, Madrid		68/72
	The Surrender of Breda	1634–1635	307.5 × 370.5	Museo del Prado, Madrid		69/73
	Portrait of Juan Martínez Montañés	1635–1636	110.5 × 87.5	Museo del Prado, Madrid		70/76
	Felipe IV cazador	1632–1633	189 × 124.5	Museo del Prado, Madrid		71/63
	El cardenal infante don Fernando de Austria cazador	1632–1633	191.5 × 108	Museo del Prado, Madrid		72/64
	Prince Balthasar Charles as a Hunter	1635–1636	191 × 102	Museo del Prado, Madrid		73/77
	El príncipe Baltasar Carlos en el picadero (Prince Baltasar Carlos in the Riding School)	1636	144 × 96.5	Duke of Westminster Collection, London		74/78
	The Lady with a Fan	1635	95 × 70	Wallace Collection, London		75/79
	The Needlewoman	1635–1643	74 × 60	National Gallery of Art, Washington D.C.	Unfinished and of uncertain date.	77/81
	Portrait of Pablo de Valladolid	1636–1637	213.5 × 125	Museo del Prado, Madrid		78/82
	The Jester Calabacillas	1637–1639	105.5 × 82.5	Museo del Prado, Madrid		79/83
	The Jester Barbarroja	1637–1640	200 × 121.5	Museo del Prado, Madrid		80/84
	San Antonio Abad y san Pablo ermityear	1635–1638	261 × 192	Museo del Prado, Madrid		81/85
	Portrait of the Count-Duke of Olivares	1638	67 × 54	Hermitage Museum, Saint Petersburg		82/87
	Francesco I d’Este	1638	68 × 51	Galleria Estense, Modena		84/89
	El príncipe Baltasar Carlos	1639	128.5 × 99	Kunsthistorisches Museum, Vienna	Velázquez and workshop.	86/90
	Retrato de hombre	1635–1645	76 × 64.8	Apsley House, London		87/91
	Aesop	1639–1641	179.5 × 94	Museo del Prado, Madrid	Inscription at top right: "AESOPVS".	88/92
	Menipo	1639–1641	178.5 × 93.5	Museo del Prado, Madrid	Inscription at top left: "MOENIPPVS".	89/93
	Mars Resting	1639–1641	181 × 99	Museo del Prado, Madrid		90/94
	Self-Portrait	1640	45.8 × 38	Museu de Belles Arts de València		91/96
	Retrato de niña	1640	51.5 × 41	Hispanic Society of America, New York City	Unfinished according to López-Rey, highlighting the vigorous brushstrokes in the garment, and "one of the most captivating female portraits by Velazquez," according to Brown.	92/97
	Portrait of Francisco Lezcano	1643–1645	107.5 × 83.5	Museo del Prado, Madrid		93/99
	Portrait of Philip IV in Fraga	1644	129.8 × 99.4	Frick Collection, New York City		94/100
	The Jester Don Diego de Acedo	1645	106 × 82.5	Museo del Prado, Madrid		96/102
	Portrait of Sebastián de Morra	1645	106 × 81.5	Museo del Prado, Madrid		97/103
	Coronation of the Virgin	1645	178.5 × 134.5	Museo del Prado, Madrid		98/105
	Rokeby Venus		122.5 × 177	National Gallery of London		100/106
	Female Figure	1644-1648	64 × 58	Meadows Museum, Dallas		101/108
	La infanta María Teresa	1648	48 × 37	Metropolitan Museum of Art, New York City		102/109
	Un caballero de la Orden de Santiago	1645–1650	67 × 56	Gemäldegalerie Alte Meister, Dresden		103/110

== Second trip to Italy (1649–1651) ==
Painting	Title	Date	Dimensions (cm)	Collection	Notes	Catalog numbers: Morán–Sánchez/López-Rey
	Portrait of Juan de Pareja	1649–1650	81.3 × 69.9	Metropolitan Museum of Art, New York City		104/112
	Ferdinando Brandani	1650	50.5 × 47	Museo del Prado, Madrid		105/113
	Portrait of Innocent X	1650	140 × 120	Doria Pamphilj Gallery, Rome	Signature on the role held by the pope: "Alla san^{ta} di Nr^{o} Sig^{re} / Innocencio Xº / Per / Diego de Silva / Velázquez dela Ca / mera di S. Mt^{e} Catt^{ca}"	106/114
	Innocent X	1650	82 × 71.5	Apsley House, London		107/115
	Camillo Massimi	1650	73.6 × 58.5	Kingston Lacy, Dorset		108/116
	El cardenal Astalli	1650–1651	61 × 48.5	Hispanic Society of America, New York City		109/117

== Madrid (1651–1660) ==
Painting	Title	Date	Dimensions (cm)	Collection	Notes	Catalog numbers: Morán–Sánchez/López-Rey
	María Teresa, infanta de España	1651–1652	34.3 × 40	Metropolitan Museum of Art, New York City	The work has been cut. Critics have unanimously considered it by Velázquez. Brown (1986) believes that it could be a study used as a model for later portraits.	110/118
	Portrait of the Infanta Maria Theresa of Spain	1651–1653	127 × 98.5	Kunsthistorisches Museum, Vienna		111/119
	Felipe IV	1653–1655	69 × 56	Museo del Prado, Madrid		112/120
	Portrait of Mariana of Austria	1652–1653	234 × 131.5	Museo del Prado, Madrid	Painted on a portrait of the king, perhaps only sketched. López-Rey said, confirmed in the technical study conducted at the Museo del Prado, that the top of the curtain was painted by another hand on a piece of fabric added to the original composition, in order to match the canvas with Philip IV with a lion, the Museo del Prado, the work of the workshop.	113/121
	La infanta Margarita	1653	128.5 × 100	Kunsthistorisches Museum, Vienna		114/122
	La infanta Margarita	1656	105 × 88	Kunsthistorisches Museum, Vienna		115/123
	Las Meninas	1656–1657	318 × 276	Museo del Prado, Madrid		116/124
	Las Hilanderas or The Fable of Arachne	c. 1657	167 × 252	Museo del Prado, Madrid	The addition of a new section to the upper portion of the canvas was probably the result of repair after the fire at the Alcázar in 1734.	117/107
	La reina Mariana de Austria	1655–1656	46.5 × 43	Meadows Museum, Dallas	Probably an unfinished study.	118/125
	Mercurio y Argos	1659	128 × 250	Museo del Prado, Madrid	Painted for the Hall of Mirrors in the Alcazar with three other paintings of mythological subjects missing in the fire of 1734.	120/127
	Infanta Margarita Teresa in a Blue Dress	1659	127 × 107	Kunsthistorisches Museum, Vienna		121/128
	Portrait of Prince Philip Prospero	1659	128.5 × 99.5	Kunsthistorisches Museum, Vienna		122/129

== Paintings of debated attribution ==
Painting	Title	Date	Dimensions (cm)	Collection	Notes	Catalog numbers: Morán–Sánchez/López-Rey
	Education of the Virgin	1617-1618		Yale University Art Gallery, New Haven	Thought to have been given to Yale in 1925, the painting has previously been attributed to the 17th-century Spanish school. Some scholars are prepared to attribute the painting to Velázquez, though the Prado Museum in Madrid is reserving judgment. The work will be restored by conservators at Yale.	
	La mulata	1620	55 × 104.5	Art Institute of Chicago, Chicago	Brown and others cannot rule out the work of a copyist.	4/18
	Cabeza de hombre joven de perfil	1618–1619	39.5 × 35.8	Hermitage Museum, Saint Petersburg		7/8
	The Farmers' Lunch	1618–1619	96 × 112	Museum of Fine Arts, Budapest		8/9
	La Immaculada	1618–1620	142 × 98.5	Centro de Investigación Diego Velázquez, Fundación Focus-Abengoa Sevilla	Presented in Paris in 1990 as the work of Velazquez's circle. Sotheby's auction in London (1994) with attribution to Velazquez relying on the favorable opinion of José López-Rey and Jonathan Brown. This is rejected by Alfonso Pérez Sánchez, who assigns it to Alonso Cano.	
	Las lágrimas de San Pedro	1618–1619	132 × 98.5	Colección Villar-Mir, Madrid		
	San Juan Bautista en el desierto	1620	175.3 × 152.5	Art Institute of Chicago		
	Retrato de un clérigo	1622–1623	66.5 × 51	Colección Payá, Madrid	Inscription "AETATIS SVAE. 40-". Presented by Mayer in 1936, López-Rey admits as Velázquez, noting its poor condition, and thinks that the portrait could be of Francisco de Rioja. For Brown, only "possibly Velázquez".	23/26
	A gentleman (Juan de Fonseca?)	1623	52 × 40	Detroit Institute of Arts, Detroit		
	El venerable padre fray Simón de Rojas difunto	1624	101 × 121	Colección de los duques del Infantado, Madrid	Inscriptions: "AVE MARIA" and at top right, "El RºP.M. Fr. Simon D. Roxas". Antonio Palomino notes that Velazquez painted a portrait of Simon de Rojas "being dead". Identified by Pérez Sánchez in a Madrid private collection, attributed to Francisco de Zurbarán.	
	Felipe IV	1624	200 × 102.9	Metropolitan Museum of Art, New York City		26/29
	Portrait of the Count-Duke of Olivares	1624	201.2 × 111.1	São Paulo Museum of Art, São Paulo		27/30
	El conde-duque de Olivares	1624–1626	216 × 192.5	Hispanic Society of America, New York City	Inscriptions: "el Conde Duque" and a barely legible "A 25".	29/32
	El conde-duque de Olivares	1624–1625	209 × 111	Colección Várez Fisa, Madrid	In poor condition; the surface is badly damaged except for the head. Excluded from the catalog by López-Rey and Brown, among others.	30/–
	Retrato de hombre	1626–1628	104 × 79	Museo Soumaya, Mexico City	Problematic for López-Rey, because of the poor condition. For Brown, "possibly by Velazquez".	–/34
	Felipe IV con jubón amarillo	1628	205 × 117	John and Mable Ringling Museum of Art, Sarasota, Florida	Rejected by López-Rey and Brown, but defended by Julian Gallego when exhibited in 1990 at the Museo del Prado.	
	El bufón Calabacillas	1626–1632	175.5 × 106.5	Cleveland Museum of Art, Cleveland	Rejected by Brown.	36/39
	Portrait of a Clergyman (Self-portrait?)	1630	67 × 50	Capitoline Museums, Rome		
	Riña entre soldados ante la embajada de España / "La rissa"	1630	28.9 × 39.6	Colección Pallavicini, Rome	Oil on copper. Attributed to Velazquez by Roberto Longhi, noting similarities with The Forge and Joseph's Tunic, a thesis defended by Marini and Salort, who noted the exceptional technical quality.	
	Santa Rufina	1632–1634	77 × 64	Centro de Investigaciones Diego Velázquez, Fundación Focus-Abengoa, Seville		
	Portrait of a Man	1630	68.6 × 55.2	Metropolitan Museum of Art, New York City	Posited by Mayer in 1917 as a self-portrait, relating to one of the characters in The Surrender of Breda. Cataloged in the museum as a work of the workshop, after exclusion by López-Rey, but has again been attributed to Velazquez with the support of Jonathan Brown after cleaning in 2009.	
	Portrait of a Man	1630		Otto Naumann, New York City	Rediscovered in 2010, sold at an auction in London for $4.7 million in 2011 to New York dealer Otto Naumann.	
	Cristo en la cruz	1631	100 × 57	Museo del Prado, Madrid	Signed "Do. Velazquez fa. 1631", which may or may not be a later addition to the painting.	
	Dama joven	1635	98 × 49	Collection of the Duke of Devonshire, Chatsworth, Derbyshire, United Kingdom		76/80
	San Antonio Abad	1635–1638	55.8 × 40	Private collection, New York City		
	La tela real	1636–1638	182 × 302	National Gallery of London		85/-
	El conde-duque de Olivares	1638	10 × 8	Palacio Real de Madrid, Madrid	Oil on copper. Some documents show that Velázquez painted portraits in miniature on copper, including some members of the royal family.	83/88
	Don Francisco Bandrés de Abarca	1638–1646	64 × 53	Private collection, Switzerland	Supported by López-Rey, while noting the poor condition (possibly a fragment half-length portrait) and lack of resemblance to other portraits of the same period.	
	Retrato ecuestre de Felipe IV	1645	393 × 267	Uffizi, Florence		95/101
	El bufón don Sebastián de Morra	1645	106 × 84.5	Private collection, Switzerland		
	Juan Francisco Pimentel, conde de Benavente	1648	109.5 × 88.5	Museo del Prado, Madrid	Exhibited at the museum as "attributed" to Velazquez and excluded by López-Rey and Brown, but supported by Gallego in the exhibition of 1990, Marias (1996) and Bottineau (1998).	99/-
	La gallega	1645–1650	60 × 46.5	Private collection, Switzerland?	Unfinished. Rejected by Brown.	
	Cristoforo Segni	1650–1651	114 × 92	Private collection	Thought to have been conceived entirely by Velázquez who also painted at least the head. The rest of the painting was done by Pietro Martire Neri.	
	La infanta Margarita	1653	115 × 91	Collection of the Dukes of Alba, Madrid		
	Felipe IV	1656–1657	64 × 53.75	National Gallery of London		123/-
	La reina Mariana de Austria	1656–1657	64.7 × 54.6	Thyssen-Bornemisza Museum, Madrid	Excluded by Brown.	119/126

== Drawings ==
Drawing	Title	Date	Medium	Dimensions (cm)s	Collection	Notes	Catalog numbers: Brown/López-Rey
	Busto de muchacha	1618	Charcoal on paper	20 × 13.5	Biblioteca Nacional de España, Madrid	For Brown this and the following are "possibly Velázquez."	DQ6/4
	Cabeza de muchacha	1618	Charcoal on paper	15 × 11.7	Biblioteca Nacional de España, Madrid		DQ1/5
	Study for Cristo contemplado por el alma cristiana	1626–1628			Earlier in the Jovellanos Institute, Gijón	Destroyed in 1936.	DQ5/35b
	Study for The Surrender of Breda	1634–1635	Black pencil on paper	26.2 × 16.8	Biblioteca Nacional de España, Madrid		D2a/74
	Study for the figure of General Spinola in The Surrender of Breda	1634–1635	Black pencil on paper	26.2 × 16.8	Biblioteca Nacional de España, Madrid	Drawn on the back of the former.	D2b/75
	Retrato de don Gaspar de Borja y Velasco	1643–1645	Black pencil on paper	18.6 × 11.6	Real Academia de Bellas Artes de San Fernando, Madrid	Study for a lost portrait.	D1/98

== Sources ==
- Bardi, P.M. (1969). "Documentación sobre el hombre y el artista". La obra pictórica completa de Velázquez. Barcelona: Editorial Noguer SA y Rizzoli Editores.
- Brown, Jonathan (1986). Velázquez. Pintor y cortesano. Madrid: Alianza Editorial. ISBN 84-206-9031-7.
- Brown, Jonathan y Garrido, Carmen (1998). Velázquez. La técnica del genio. Madrid: Ediciones Encuentro. ISBN 84-7490-487-0.
- Brown, Jonathan (2008). Escritos completos sobre Velázquez. Madrid: Centro de Estudios Europa Hispánica. ISBN 978-84-9360-605-3.
- Catálogo de la exposición (1990). Velázquez. Madrid: Museo Nacional del Prado. ISBN 84-87317-01-4.
- Catálogo de la exposición (1996). Obras maestras del arte español. Museo de Bellas Artes de Budapest. Madrid: Banco Bilbao Vizcaya. ISBN 84-860-2288-6.
- Catálogo de la exposición (1999). Velázquez y Sevilla. Sevilla: Junta de Andalucía. Consejería de Cultura. ISBN 84-8266-098-5.
- Catálogo de la exposición (1999). El dibujo europeo en tiempos de Velázquez. Madrid: Real Academia de Bellas Artes de San Fernando. ISBN 84-898-9514-7.
- Catálogo de la exposición (1999). Velázquez, Rubens y Van Dyck. Madrid: Museo Nacional del Prado. ISBN 84-87317-86-3.
- Catálogo de la exposición (1999). Velázquez a Roma Velázquez e Roma. Roma: Galería Borghese. ISBN 88-8118-669-1.
- Catálogo de la exposición (2005). De Herrera a Velázquez. El primer naturalismo en Sevilla. Bilbao Sevilla: Museo de Bellas Artes de Bilbao-Fundación Focus Abengoa. ISBN 84-898-9514-7.
- Catálogo de la exposición (2007). Fábulas de Velázquez. Madrid: Museo del Prado. ISBN 978-84-8480-129-0.
- Garrido Pérez, Carmen (1992). Velázquez, técnica y evolución. Madrid: Museo del Prado. ISBN 84-87317-16-2.
- Gudiol, José (1982). Velázquez. Barcelona: Ediciones Poligrafa SA. ISBN 84-343-03531.
- López-Rey, José (1978). Velázquez. Barcelona: Compañía Internacional Editora S. A. ISBN 84-85004-74-4.
- López-Rey, José (1996). Velázquez. Catalogue raisonné, vol. II. Colonia: Taschen Wildenstein Institute. ISBN 3-8228-8731-5.
- Marías, Fernando (1999). Velázquez. Pintor y criado del rey. Madrid: Nerea. ISBN 84-89569-33-9.
- Marini, Maurizio (1997). Velázquez. Madrid: Electa. ISBN 84-8156-160-6.
- Morán Turina, Miguel & Sánchez Quevedo, Isabel (1999). Velázquez. Catálogo completo. Madrid: Ediciones Akal SA. ISBN 84-460-1349-5.
- Palomino, Antonio (1988). El museo pictórico y escala óptica III. El parnaso español pintoresco laureado. Madrid: Aguilar S.A. de Ediciones. ISBN 84-03-88005-7.
- Pérez Sánchez; Alfonso E. (1996). "Escuela española". El Museo del Prado. Fundación Amigos del Museo del Prado y Fonds Mercator. ISBN 90-6153363-5.
- Pérez Sánchez; Alfonso E. (1999). "Novedades velazqueñas". Archivo Español de Arte nº 72. Consejo Superior de Investigaciones Científicas.
- Ragusa, Elena (2004). "La vida y el arte.". Velázquez. Milan: RCS Libri S.p.A. ISBN 84-89780-54-4.
- Ragusa, Elena (2004). "Breve antología crítica". Velázquez. Milán:RCS Libri S.p.A. ISBN 84-89780-54-4.
- Salort Pons, Salvador (2002). Velázquez en Italia. Madrid: Fundación de Apoyo a la Historia del Arte Hispánico. ISBN 84-932891-1-6.
