= 1622 in art =

Events from the year 1622 in art.

== Events ==
- April – Diego Velázquez moves from Seville to Madrid.

== Paintings ==
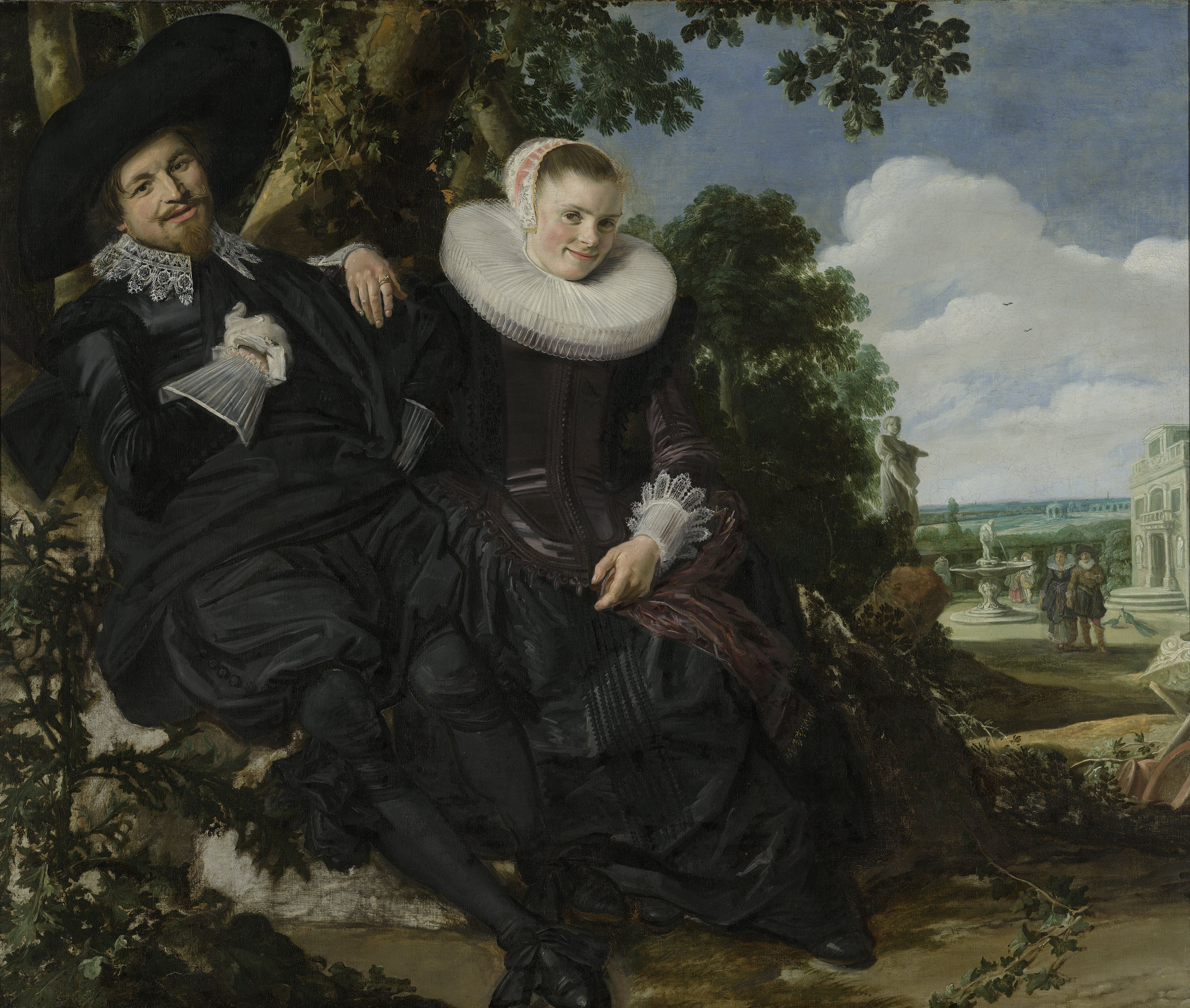
Hals – Marriage Portrait of Isaac Massa and Beatrix van der Laen

- Artemisia Gentileschi – Portrait of a Condottiero
- Guercino – Et in Arcadia ego
- Frans Hals – Marriage Portrait of Isaac Massa and Beatrix van der Laen
- Gerard van Honthorst – Adoration of the Shepherds
- Pieter Lastman – The Angel and the Prophet Balaam
- Johann Liss – Judith in the Tent of Holofernes
- Guido Reni - St. Francis in Ecstasy
- Dirck van Baburen (some dates approximate)
  - Backgammon Players
  - Christ among the Doctors
  - The Lute Player
  - The Procuress
  - Young Man Singing
- Esaias van de Velde – The Cattle Ferry
- Anthony van Dyck – Teresia, Lady Shirley (approximate date)
- Diego Velázquez
  - La mulata (approximate date)
  - Portrait of Don Luis de Góngora

== Births ==
- February 18 - Thomas Regnaudin, French sculptor (died 1706)
- February 27 – Carel Fabritius, Dutch painter who works in Rembrandt's studio in Amsterdam (died 1654)
- May 4 – Juan de Valdés Leal, Spanish Baroque painter (died 1690)
- date unknown
  - Luo Mu, Chinese painter, poet and prose writer (died 1706)
  - Giovanni Maria Morandi, Italian painter of altarpieces (died 1717)
  - Theodore Poulakis, Greek Renaissance painter (died 1692)
- probable
  - Dominique Barrière, French painter and engraver (died 1678)
  - Abraham Lambertsz van den Tempel, Dutch Golden Age painter (died 1672)

== Deaths ==
- April 15 - Leandro Bassano, Venetian artist and younger brother of Francesco Bassano the Younger (born 1557)
- May 17 - Leonello Spada, Italian Caravaggisto specializing in decorative quadratura painting (born 1576)
- June 3 - Francesco Carracci, Italian painter and engraver (born 1595)
- June 22 - Bernardino Cesari, Italian painter of the late-Mannerist and early Baroque period (born 1565)
- August 10 - Giovanni Battista Viola, Italian painter of landscape canvases (born 1576)
- December 12 - Bartolomeo Manfredi, Italian painter, a leading member of the Caravaggisti (born 1582)
- date unknown
  - Costantini de' Servi, Italian painter (born 1554)
  - Aurelio Lomi, Italian painter of frescoes (born 1556)
  - Vespasiano Strada, Italian painter and engraver (born 1582)
  - Gillis van Valckenborch, Flemish painter (born 1570
- probable - Yi Chong, Korean painter (born 1541)
