= Portrait of Francisco Lezcano =

1645 painting by Diego Velázquez

Francisco Lezcano, el Niño de Vallecas
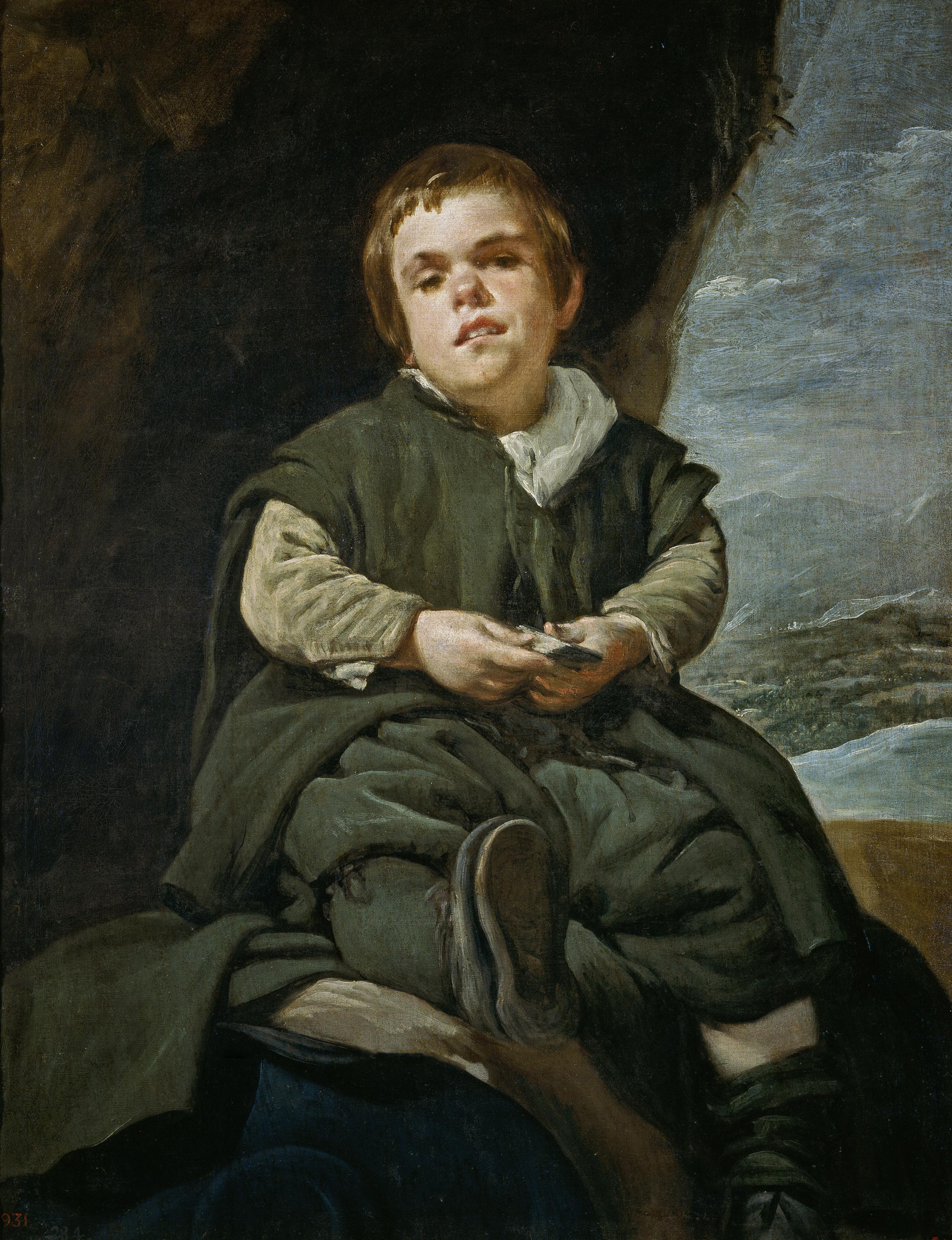
- Artist: Diego Velázquez
- Year: 1643–1645
- Medium: Oil on canvas
- Dimensions: 106 cm × 83 cm (42 in × 33 in)
- Location: Museo del Prado; Madrid

Portrait of Francisco Lezcano or The "Niño de Vallecas" is the 1645 portrait by Diego Velázquez of Francisco Lezcano (died 1649), also known as Lezcanillo or el Vizcaíno, a jester at the court of Philip IV of Spain. It has been in the Prado since 1819.

The mountains round Madrid can be seen in the right background, whilst the subject holds cards in his hands. The painting is part of a series of paintings of jesters at the court, and this one was possibly painted whilst the subject was accompanying the king on a hunt, since he is shown in hunting attire in the open air. It was produced for display in the Torre de la Parada (a hunting lodge on the outskirts of Madrid in the Sierra de Guadarrama near El Pardo).

On 28 July 1714 it was moved to the Palacio del Pardo, before appearing in 1772 at the home of infante Javier in the new Palacio Real in Madrid. In 1794 it was in the "Pieza de Trucos" of the same palace, at which time it gained its alternative name of Niño de Vallecas.

== See also ==
- List of works by Diego Velázquez

== Bibliography ==
- Museo del Prado. Pintura española de los siglos XVI y XVII. Enrique Lafuente Ferrari. Aguilar S.A. 1964
