= View of the Garden of the Villa Medici =

Painting by Diego Velázquez

- Vista del jardín de la Villa Médicis (Spanish)
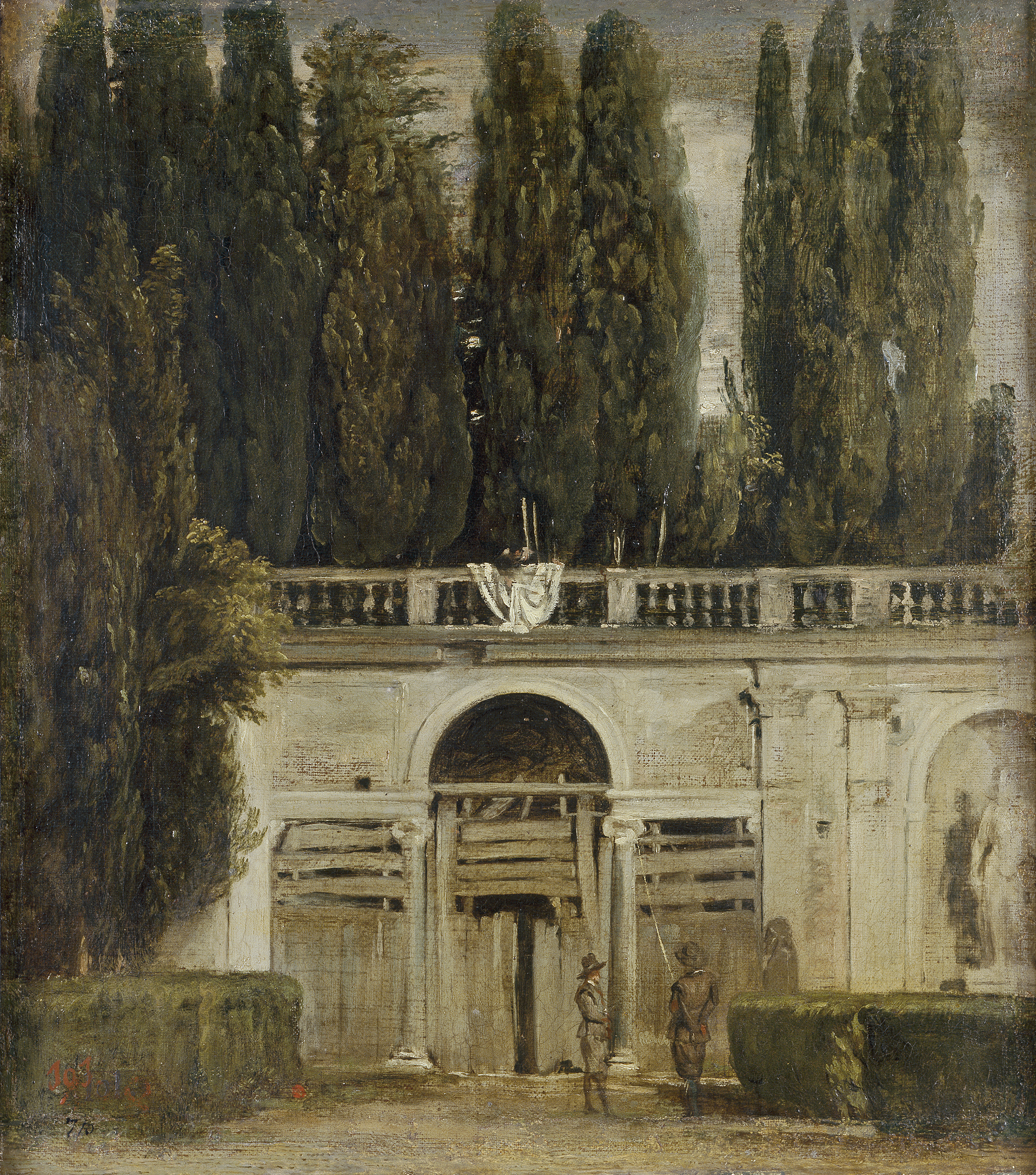
- Artist: Diego Velázquez
- Year: c. 1630 or c. 1649
- Medium: Oil on canvas
- Dimensions: 48 cm × 42 cm (19 in × 17 in)
- Location: Museo del Prado; Madrid

View of the Garden of the Villa Medici is the title of an oil painting by Spanish artist Diego Velázquez, as well as its pendant piece. Critics maintain that the work was created during one of his two trips to Italy—likely his second visit in 1649–1650. The paintings depict quiet, atmospheric scenes of the Villa Medici gardens in Rome, focusing on architectural details and natural light rather than narrative or mythological themes, which were more typical of the time. In one painting, known as Afternoon, two men converse near a boarded-up stone archway, while in the smaller pendant, Midday, a gardener speaks with a cleric near a gated entrance.

The understated scenes and natural lighting of the piece suggest Velázquez painted them outdoors and directly from observation, a technique later embraced by 19th-century Impressionists. Recent research supports the theory that the paintings were made during a period of restoration at the Villa Medici, as historical records describe repairs to a grotto featured in the works. These paintings stand out for their quiet realism and are now housed in the Museo del Prado in Madrid.

== History of creation ==
Although the exact date of this piece is undetermined, confirmation that it was painted from life restricts the times possible to one of Velázquez’s two trips to Italy, which occurred from both 1629-1630 and 1649-1651. While some critics advocate that evidence of Velazquez’s residence at the Villa Medici in 1630 supports the former timeframe, others argue that the techniques used in the piece are more reflective of his work from the later dates.

== Composition ==
View of The Garden of the Villa Medici is an oil on canvas piece measuring 18 7/8 x 16 1/2 inches. It was painted atop a base of brown primer, typical of his earlier works produced in Italy, upon which layers of oil paint were added to achieve the desired depth. Applying a light and natural style, Velázquez focuses on portraying the dramatic atmosphere of the garden in great detail. It was, in fact, created “en plein air”, meaning that Velazquez painted it outside and on the site of the scene depicted. This technique was more common in 19th century Impressionism than in other natural pieces of the time; although many Roman landscape painters sketched from nature, they used these sketches only as inspiration for oil paintings which would later be made in the studio.

== Content ==
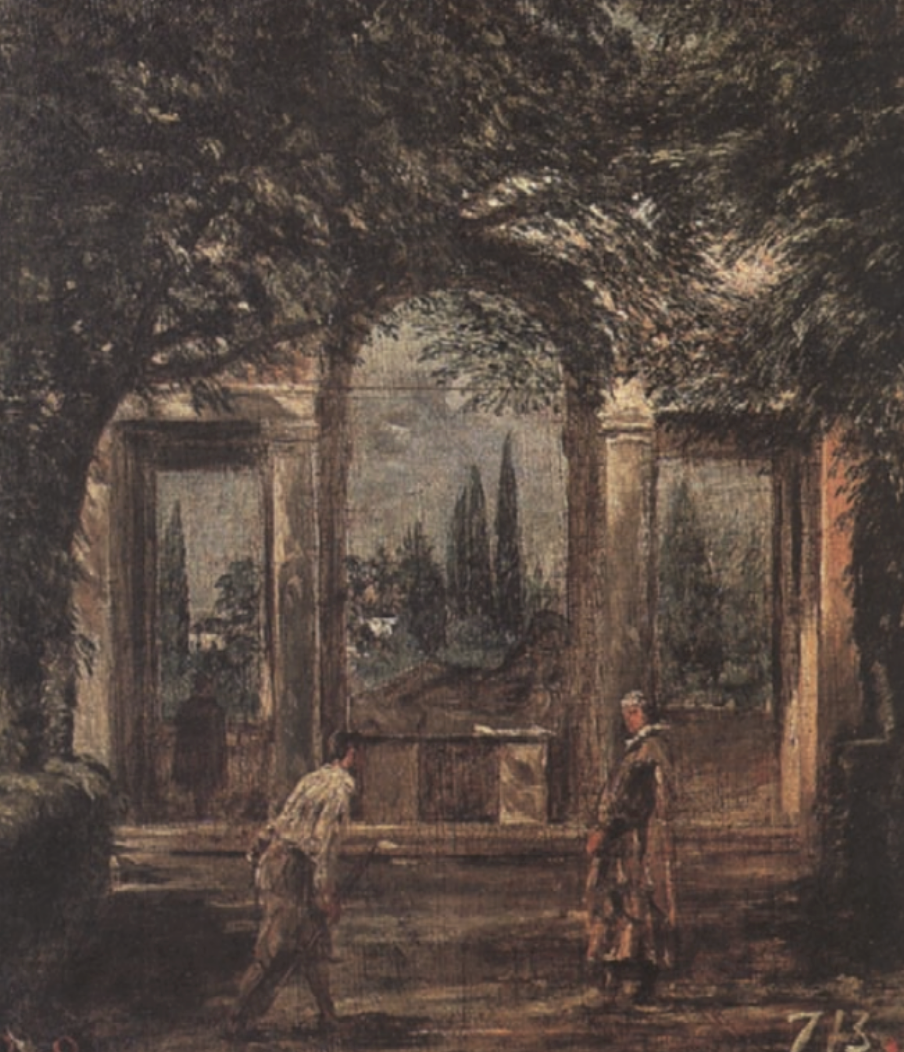
Pendant version of View of the Garden of Villa of Medici, known as Midday

In contrast to the narrative-driven landscape paintings of prominent 17th-century Roman artists like Poussin and Claude, which often featured subtle yet intentional themes or messages, Velázquez's View of the Garden of the Villa Medici stands out for lacking a clear storyline or identifiable characters.

=== Afternoon ===
In the larger work, Afternoon, two men stand conversing near a Serlio portal that has been boarded up, seemingly under repair. This portal leads to a dark interior, which is known to be a grotto, still in existence today. Above the arch there is a terrace enclosed by a balustrade where a figure stands. It is either a woman or a servant leaning over a wrinkled cloth draped over the railing. The details of the scene are highlighted against a background of cypress trees. Below, boxwood or myrtle plantings frame a bust that resembles a bearded Hermes. To the right of the portal, a wall adorned with pilasters features a vaulted niche containing a statue.

=== Midday ===
The associated smaller pendant, Midday, similarly shows a Serlio Gate, albeit one in a different location, opening up into the present-day Villa Borghese. A man looks out through the left-most portal, with the center portal occupied by an Ariadne similar to one Velázquez brought back to Madrid. The foreground shows a gardener leaning over, listening to a cleric facing towards the gate. The roughly-rendered characters nearly blend in with the background, taking second stage to the Serlio Gate. It is generally unclear what the two are talking about, and there is no distinct connection between the characters featured in the two works.

=== Interpretation ===
Though there are no clear narratives present in the works, historians speculate about their significance. Antonio Ortiz proposes that the scenes challenge the belief that painters must first be architects, with Velázquez utilizing the Serlio Gates as pictorial motifs that change with shifting perspectives, allowing this to dictate the true nature of the architecture. The Museo del Prado’s description highlights Velazquez’s belief in the importance of the experience of real life, with the intersection of light and shadow emphasizing the momentary nature of both these scenes and landscapes in general.

== Restoration of the Villa Medici ==
In her 1981 study, Enriqueta Harris builds on research by Glenn Andres (1976) to help date Velázquez's Villa Medici landscapes. Andres, following art historian Lafuente Ferrari, dated the paintings to around 1650 but did not address Velázquez’s earlier visit to the villa. Andres identifies two major restoration campaigns at the Villa Medici: one in 1626, preceding a visit by Grand Duke Ferdinand II in 1627, and another in 1648–1649 during Cardinal Carlo de Medici’s stay. The latter is particularly relevant, as documents from this period mention repairs to a structure called “the grotto,” likely referring to the artificial gallery seen in Velázquez’s painting Afternoon—though Andres does not make this connection explicitly.

According to Harris, the accounts from the carpenter and master mason from February and March 1649 detail structural repairs, including reinforcement of a collapsing roof, refurbishment of walls and entrances, and the installation of wine storage shelves. While these are the only surviving documents, Harris suggests that repairs likely continued for a longer period. Consequently, when Velázquez arrived in Rome in May 1649, the area he painted was probably still under renovation, as indicated by the boarded-up entrance he depicted. This supports the conclusion that the Villa Medici paintings were created between May 1649 and November 1650, during Velázquez’s stay in Rome.

== Provenance ==
Shortly after their creation, this painting and its pendant were housed in the Alcázar of Madrid, as recorded in the inventories of 1666, 1686, and 1700. On Christmas Eve of 1734, a fire broke out at the Alcázar, and both works—along with others—were rescued from the blaze. Following the fire, they were transferred to the Buen Retiro Palace, as noted in the inventories of 1772, 1789, and 1794. The paintings were later relocated to the Royal Palace of Madrid (Palacio Nuevo) and, in 1819, were moved to the Museo del Prado, where they remain today.

== See also ==
- List of works by Diego Velázquez
