= Three Musicians (Velázquez) =

Painting by Diego Velázquez

- Tres músicos (Spanish)
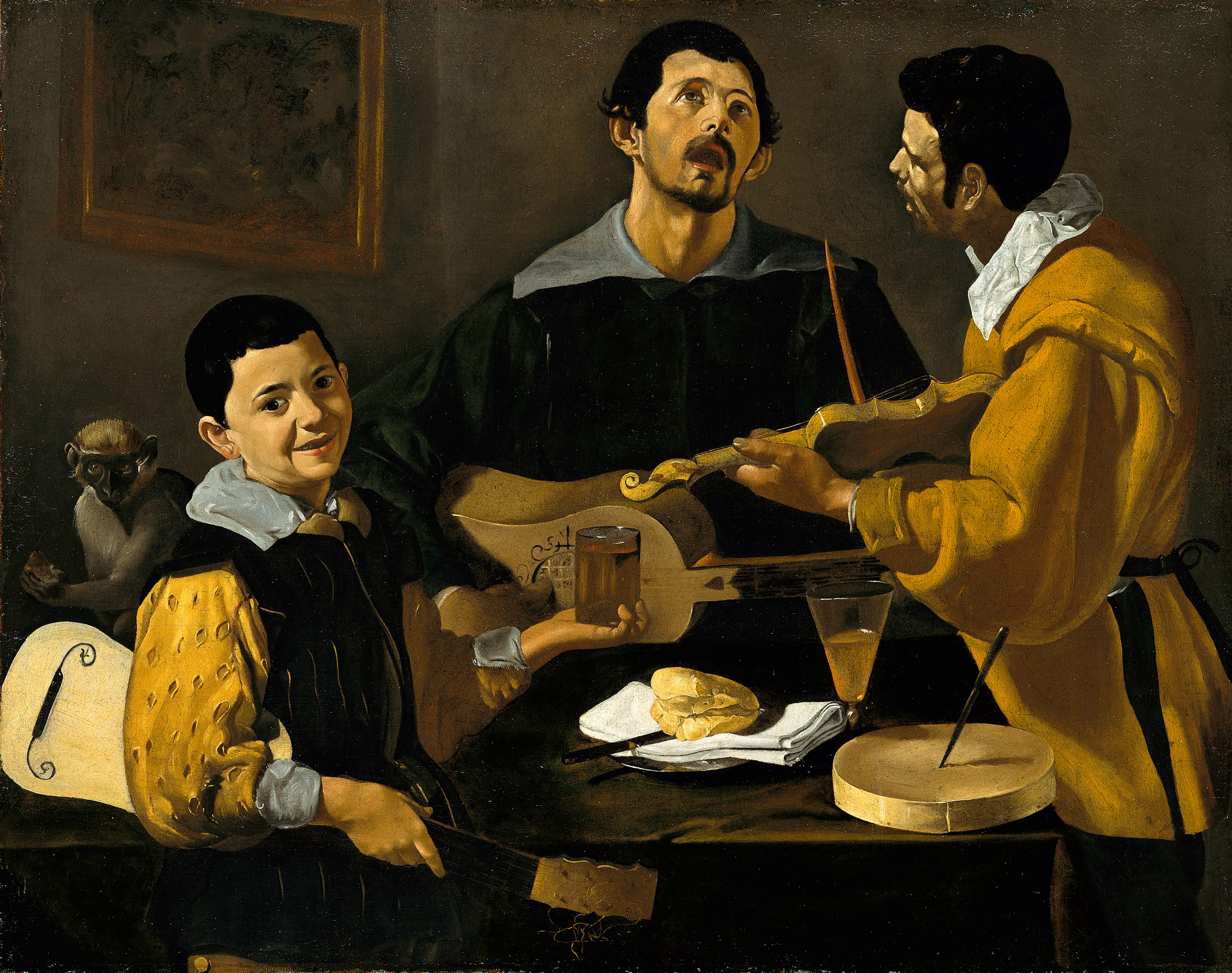
- Artist: Diego Velázquez
- Year: 1618
- Catalogue: 413F
- Medium: Oil on canvas
- Dimensions: 88 cm × 111 cm (35 in × 44 in)
- Location: Gemäldegalerie; Berlin

Three Musicians is an oil painting by Diego Velázquez, a Spanish Baroque painter considered one of the great Spanish naturalists. It depicts three young men grouped around a dinner table playing music. It is painted in chiaroscuro, a Baroque painting technique that made use of the contrast between light and dark shadows to achieve a sense of volume. The work is part of the collection of the Gemäldegalerie, Berlin.

== Description ==
Three Musicians is one of Velázquez's earliest works, from his early Seville period. It is one of approximately ten paintings in the bodegón style that Velázquez executed before 1622, while living in Seville. Its subject is similar to that of another painting, The Farmers' Lunch. In this painting three young men are grouped around a table eating, drinking and playing music, with strong contrasts of light and darkness around the figures. The light falls from the left, creating sharp shadows and intense highlights. Two men with stringed instruments are singing while the third, the youngest, has an instrument of his own under his arm and a glass of wine in his hand; he displays the glass with a mocking smile, pointing out the wine that inspires the musicians. In the background can be seen a monkey with a pear in hand. The monkey emphasizes the grotesque nature of the scene.

A loaf of bread on a napkin, a glass of wine, and a piece of cheese with a knife stuck into it give Velázquez the opportunity to study the different textures. An interesting feature of Three Musicians is the variety of issues raised, such as whether it is a genre representation or whether behind the supposedly everyday scene there are hidden layers of meaning, which can make the picture readable as an allegory, giving it a different interpretation.

== See also ==
- List of works by Diego Velázquez
- Three Musicians (Picasso)
