= The Needlewoman =

Painting by Diego Velázquez

- La costurera (Spanish)
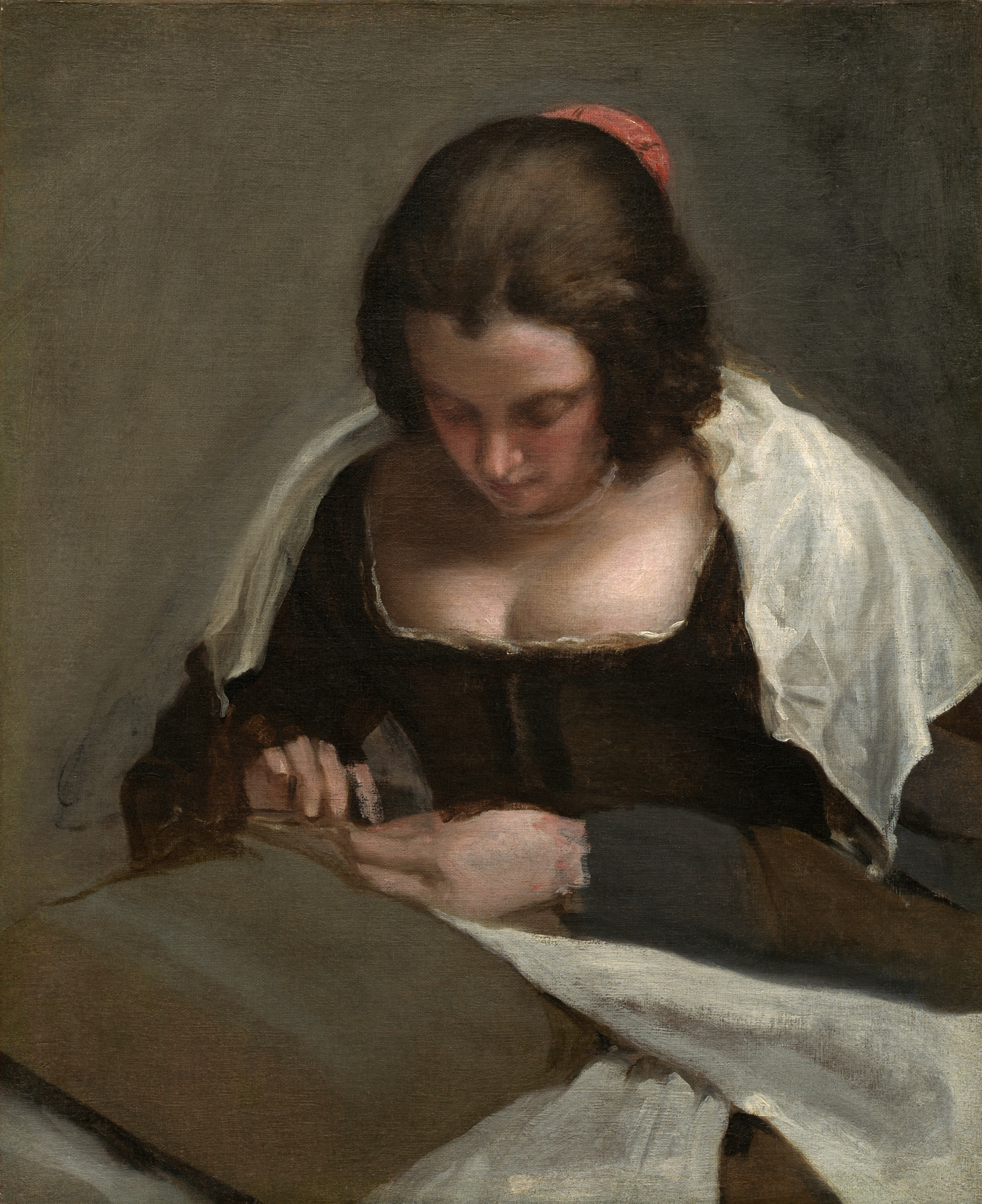
- Artist: Diego Velázquez
- Year: c. 1635-1643
- Medium: Oil on canvas
- Dimensions: 74 cm × 60 cm (29 in × 24 in)
- Location: National Gallery of Art; Washington, D.C.

The Needlewoman (Spanish: La costurera) is an oil-on-canvas painting by Diego Velázquez, painted between 1635 and 1643. It is housed in the National Gallery of Art in Washington, D.C.

== Subject ==
The Needlewoman is an unfinished portrait, in which the head, modeled in light and shadow, is the most fully realized part. The arms and hands are sketched in briefly. The result displays Velázquez's facility for portraying gesture, his method of summarily constructing the figure, and his ability to suggest a subject's melding into the surrounding atmosphere.

Similarities have been noted between The Needlewoman and The Lady with a Fan; not only do the facial features seem consistent, but so, too, is the brushwork of the face and chest. Although the subject's identity is not known for certain, it has been proposed that she was Francisca Vélazquez del Mazo, the artist's daughter. If, indeed, the subject in both paintings was the same sitter, it would at least suggest an intimacy between artist and subject.

== Attribution ==
The attribution has not been uncontested. As recently as 1944 biographer F. J. Sánchez Cantón concluded that the painting was begun by Velázquez but completed by his son-in-law, Juan Bautista Martinez del Mazo. However, the traditional attribution of the painting as entirely by the master is supported by the inventory made of the work in Velázquez's rooms at the time of his death, which includes a description of "Another head, of a woman doing needlework".

The painting came into the possession of Andrew W. Mellon in 1927, thence to the National Gallery as part of the Mellon collection in 1937.

== See also ==
- List of works by Diego Velázquez
