= Doña Antonia de Ipeñarrieta y Galdós and Her Son Don Luis =

1634 painting by Diego Velázquez

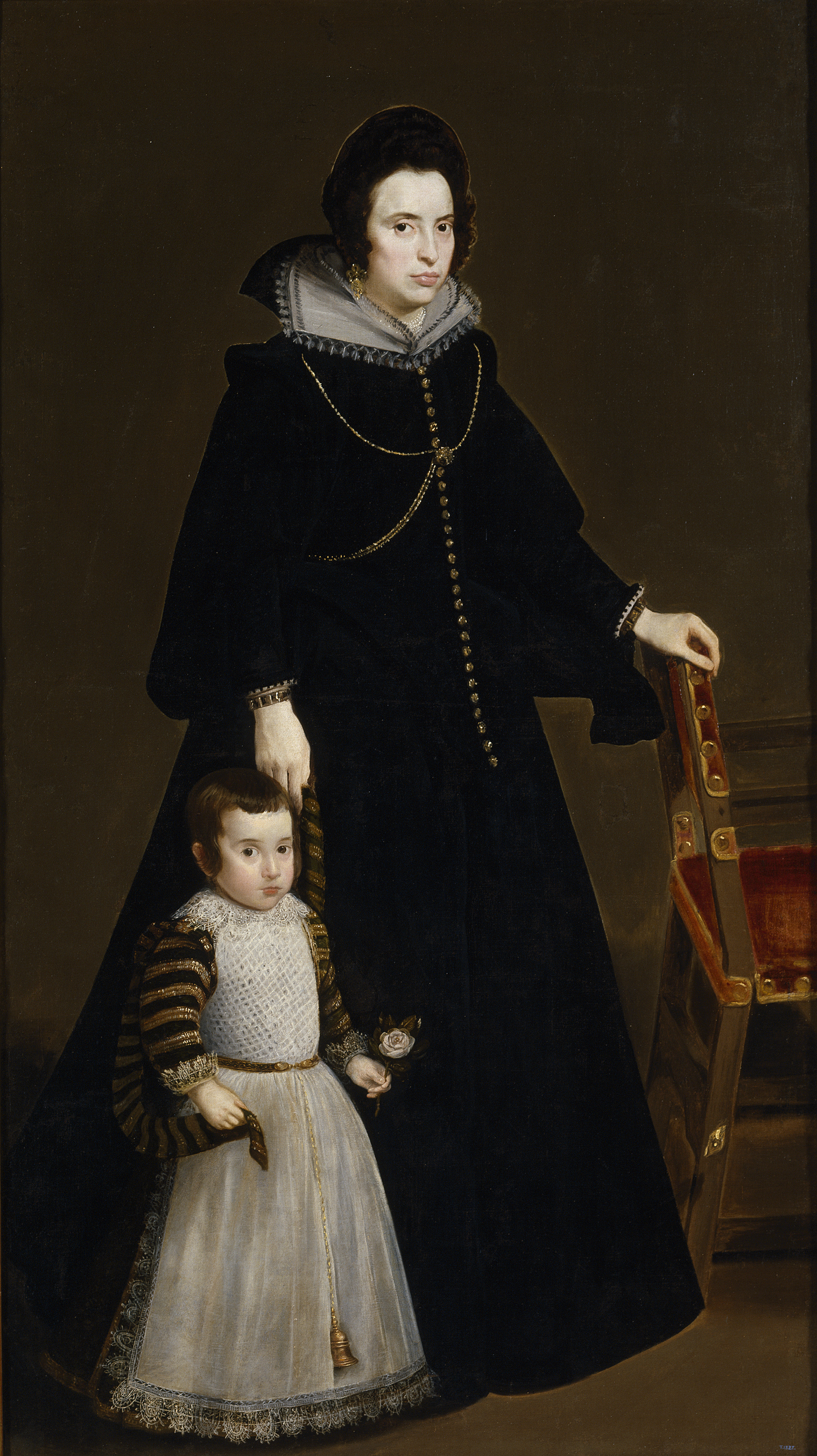
- Artist: Diego Velázquez
- Year: 1634
- Medium: oil on canvas
- Dimensions: 205 cm × 115 cm (81 in × 45 in)
- Location: Museo del Prado, Madrid

Doña Antonia de Ipeñarrieta y Galdós and Her Son Don Luis is a 1634 portrait by Diego Velázquez, now in the Prado Museum. Doña Antonia and her son Luis are shown standing, captured in an elegant melancholy. The woman uses the chair to support herself, to emphasize her social status in the Court, where she had the right to sit. According to different studies of the canvas, it is believed that the child's figure could have been added afterwards.

In this portrait, Velázquez begins to reinterpret long strokes influenced by Juan Pantoja de la Cruz, giving more expression and delicacy, expressing her natural and easy manner, and capturing a golden light with inexplicable technique. In any case, the experts consider the portrait of her husband to be superior.

== History ==
The portrait belonged to the family depicted in the painting until the year 1905, in which, its proprietor at the time, Doña María del Pilar Azlor de Aragón y Guillamas, XV Duchess of Villahermosa, the seventh grandchild of the woman in the portrait, bequeathed the painting and its partner, which belonged to the second husband of Doña Antonia, Don Diego del Corral y Arellano, by the same artist, painted years before, to the Prado Museum of Madrid.

In 1989 the painting was a part of an exposition on Velázquez which occurred in the Metropolitan Museum of Art in New York.

=== Persons shown ===
==== Antonia de Ipeñarrieta ====
Of noble ancestry, Doña Antonia de Ipeñarrieta was the daughter of Cristóbal and Antonia, born in Villareal de Urrechu, in the Guipúzcoa (País Vasco) province, where her family owned a large palace located on the side of the Irimo mountain. She was lady-in-waiting to Isabel of France, Queen consort of Spain, and servant of the house to Balthasar Charles, Prince of Asturias; she died in Madrid in 1634.

She was first married to Don García Pérez de Araciel, knight of the Order of Santiago, professor of law in the University of Salamanca and attorney general of the Council of Castile, who died in 1624. Once she became a widow, she got married again in Madrid in 1627 to Don Diego del Corral y Arellano, professor of law in the University of Salamanca, attorney of the Real Audiencia y Chancillería de Valladolid (1608), attorney and advisor of the Consejo de Hacienda (1612 and 1622), attorney and advisor of the Supremo de Justicia (1616 and 1618), knight of the Order of Santiago (1622), and of the Council of Castile (1629).

==== Luis del Corral y Arellano ====
The third child of Doña Antonia and her second husband, Don Diego, Luis was born in Madrid and was baptized under the name of Luis Vicente. He did not follow the family tradition of law and service of the Monarchy of Spain, and lived away from the court, residing in the cities of Madrid and Baeza, married to a cousin of his father, whom he did not succeed.

== See also ==
- List of works by Diego Velázquez

== Bibliography ==
- (in Spanish) Museo del Prado. Pintura española de los siglos XVI y XVII. Enrique Lafuente Ferrari. Aguilar S.A. 1964
- (in Spanish) DE CORRAL, León: Don Diego del Corral y Arellano y los Corrales de Valladolid. Apuntes históricos, Madrid, 1905.
