= Saint Paul (Velázquez) =

Painting by Diego Velázquez

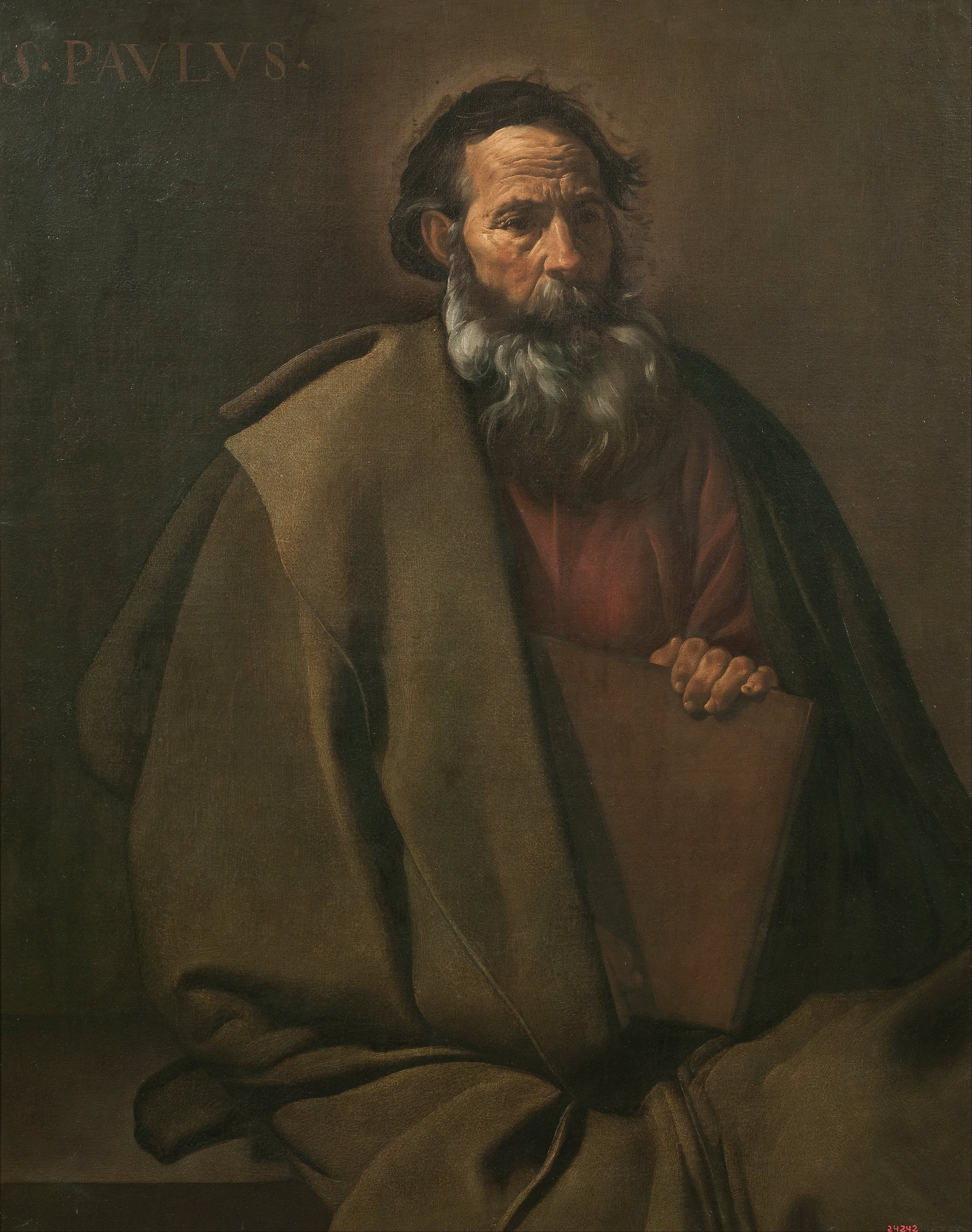
- Artist: Diego Velázquez
- Year: circa 1619
- Medium: Oil on canvas
- Dimensions: 99.5 cm × 80 cm (39.2 in × 31 in)
- Location: Museu Nacional d'Art de Catalunya, Barcelona
- Website: http://www.museunacional.cat/en/colleccio/saint-paul/diego-velazquez/024242-000

Saint Paul (Spanish: San Pablo) is a painting by Diego Velázquez that is in the Museu Nacional d'Art de Catalunya in Barcelona, Spain. The piece was created around 1619 during the early stage of Velázquez's artistic career before he moved to Madrid. At this stage of Velazquez's career he was deeply influenced by Caravaggio. In the image, Saint Paul is seated holding a book, commonly referenced as a large Gospel book.

== Image description ==
The painting was created using oil on canvas. The artist from Seville reveals his mastery of portraiture in the image of a man captured directly from nature and wrapped in a wide robe in which the folds are almost sculptural. The dramatic lighting that brings the figure into relief against a dark background is a style inherited from Tenebrism, as are the earth-tone colors commonly used by Velázquez. They present to the viewer a natural and authentic representation of the figure. The saint is sitting on a stone plinth that blends with the background area. The fingers of the left hand grasp a thick book. Perhaps to hide his limitations, Velázquez has hidden the legs and most of the hands under its folds.

According to José López-Rey, Saint Paul's head is "sharply drawn" and the image itself is "somewhat rubbed and darkened", a style typical of Velázquez's early works.

According to the New Testament, Paul was traveling to Damascus when he saw a beam of light and was visited by Jesus, who struck him blind. Three days later, Paul regained his sight and began to preach Christianity to the people. In this painting, Saint Paul is depicted wearing a large brown robe to symbolize his pilgrimage from the Holy Land to Damascus. The loose and thick cloak contains numerous creases, which suggest the heaviness of the fabric draping over a reddish/brown tunic. Saint Paul is commonly drawn with a tapering beard, brown hair, and a balding forehead to signify great wisdom and learning. However, Velázquez's image depicts Saint Paul with black hair that has a hint of grey in it, a very uncommon attribute for this figure. Velázquez's image of Saint Paul holds a blank stare, perhaps referencing his loss of eyesight from the legend.

The text in the upper-left hand corner identifies the figure as S. PAVLVS (which means "Saint Paul" in Latin). He is depicted without the sword, his only known attribute. (If not holding a book, Saint Paul is more grimly represented with a severed head and the sword that killed him, which depicts his martyrdom.) A glowing aura, or halo, around the head of the figure symbolizes that he has a sense of holiness and was canonized as a saint. Although the aura of holiness is appropriate to the subject, the work also evokes the intellectual philosophers painted by José de Ribera. Velázquez deviated from the traditional representation of Saint Paul by drawing him with a book. The Gospel book that Saint Paul is holding symbolizes that this figure is an apostle and had a great influence on the spreading of the Christian religion.

== History ==
Saint Paul was painted around 1619, before Velázquez left Seville in 1623 to become the court painter to the Spanish King, Philip IV. In 1921, August Mayer identified the painting as a work of Velázquez. This image and one of Saint Thomas (Musée des Beaux-Arts d’Orléans), also by Velázquez, are believed to have originally been housed at the Carthusian monastery of Las Cuevas in Seville. The art historian Xavier Bray says the two paintings, which are similar in their dimensions, may have been part of a series of portraits of the twelve apostles Velázquez painted while still residing in Seville, the rest of which are lost.

In Velázquez's early years as a painter, he was greatly influenced by Caravaggio, and the painting of Saint Paul is "considered a key work for understanding the influence of Caravaggio's pictorial realism in Spain."

== Style ==
The young Velázquez used influences from the classical literature of his day, like El Lazarillo de Tormes, as well as the beauty of his native country. As his career grew, he continued to use colors and objects he found in nature. He wanted to make people see his chosen subjects as they appeared to him, so he presented his figures realistically and with a "quality of immortal freshness."

Velázquez had always been a realist and was influenced by Caravaggio and Italian Renaissance painters in his youth. His use of both rough and smooth brushstrokes is "more akin to Titian's than to Caravaggio", according to José López-Rey. Velázquez was unusual among painters of his day in that he did not carefully plan his compositions or create sketches beforehand. Instead, he analyzed his models and drew completely by eye. By the time Velázquez was thirty years of age, he was already well-versed in realism and did not alter the style of his artwork.

During his early career, Velázquez painted bodegones and figure paintings. Bodegones is a term that relates to "food, drink, or tableware." The second style is the figure paintings he did between the years 1618 and 1622, which accentuate human expression. Saint Paul is an example of this style, which is a clear depiction of a somber human emotion. Only twenty of Velázquez's works have been uncovered from these early years, but it is evident that he "enjoyed painting portraits." A "unifying religious undertone" can be viewed in the majority of Velázquez's early paintings and depict his lifelong devotion to the Catholic faith.

== Relation to other artworks ==
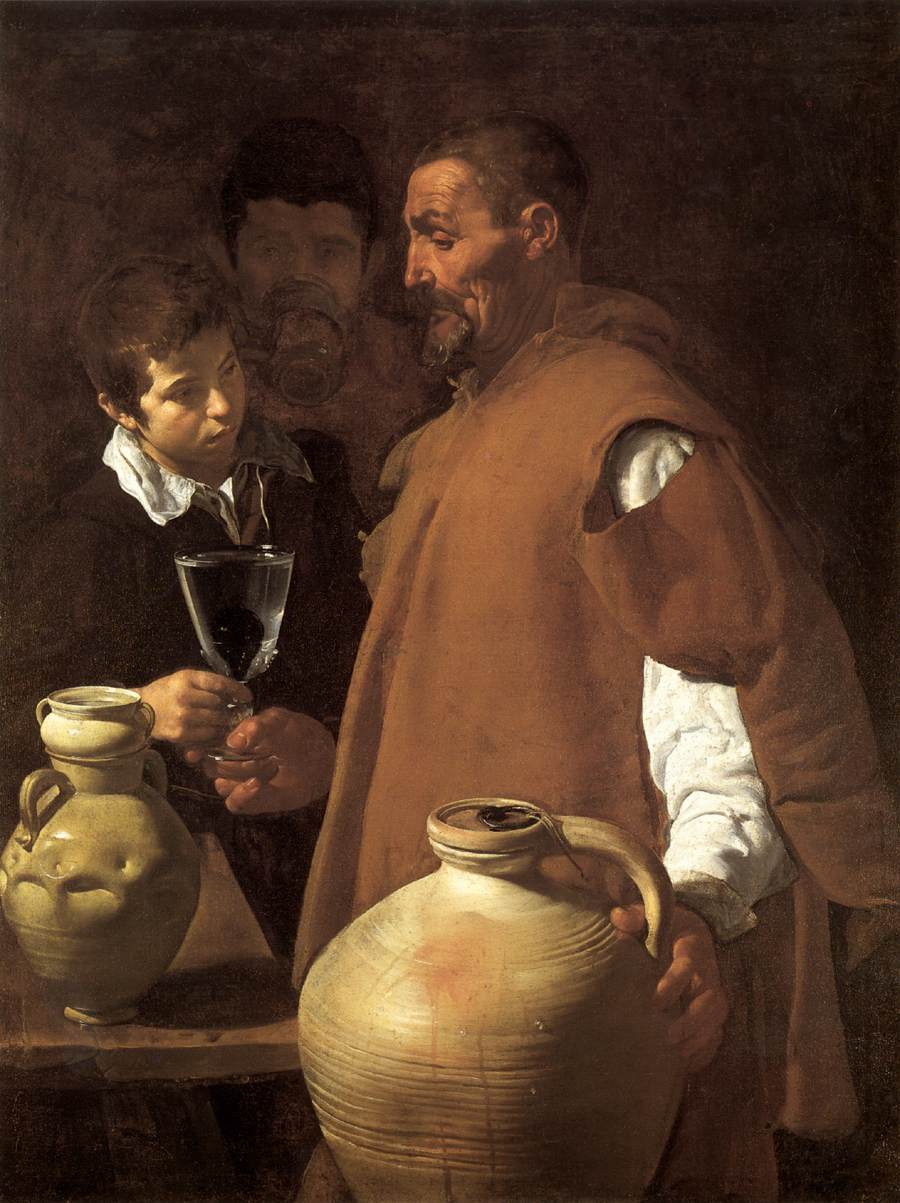
The Waterseller of Seville

In 1618, Velázquez had rented a place in Seville, where watersellers roamed the streets. Between 1618 and 1620, Velázquez painted The Waterseller of Seville. The art historian Peter Cherry believes that Velázquez used a model for this image, since Velázquez was drawn to "humble subject matter." Cherry says that the figure "bears a resemblance to Velázquez's early Saint Paul" and believes that Velázquez used the same model for The Waterseller of Seville and the 1619 painting of Saint Paul.

== See also ==
- List of works by Diego Velázquez
