= Philip IV in Brown and Silver =

Painting by Diego Velázquez

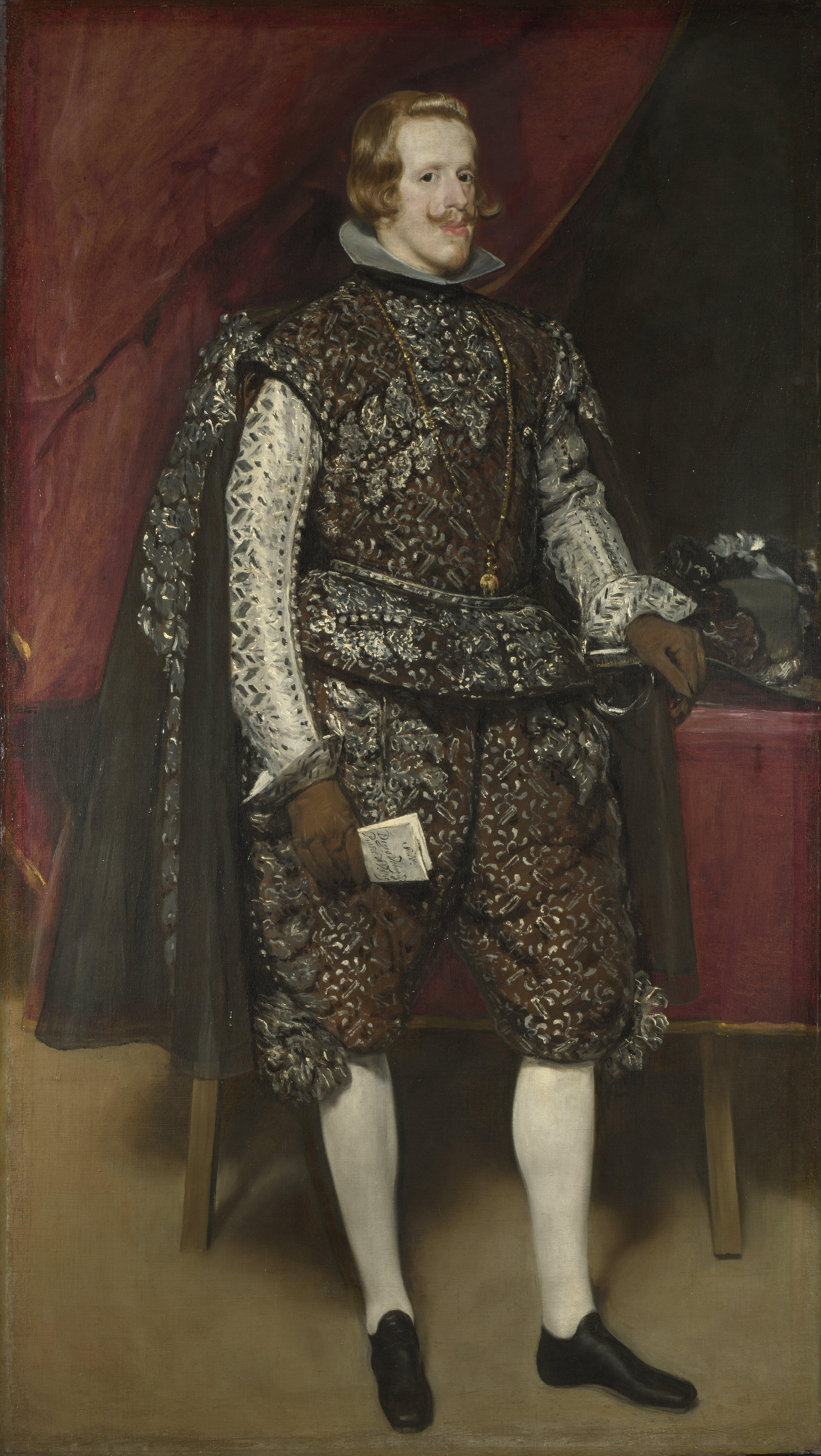
- Artist: Diego Velázquez
- Year: 1635
- Medium: oil on canvas
- Dimensions: 199 cm × 113 cm (78 in × 44 in)
- Location: National Gallery; London

The Portrait of Philip IV or Philip IV in Brown and Silver (and occasionally referred to as Philip IV of Spain in Brown and Silver) is a portrait of Philip IV of Spain painted by Diego Velázquez. It is sometimes known as Silver Philip and is now in the National Gallery in London. It was the main portrait of Philip painted by Velázquez in the 1630s, used as the model for many workshop versions.

The date of the work is not certain – the National Gallery website gives 1631–32, whilst Carrassat gives 1635 – but it was definitely the first portrait the artist produced after his first trip to Italy, in that it adopts the softer and more colourful palette of the Venetian school. There is some evidence that the portrait may have taken a number of years to complete, accounting for the uncertainty. Life size, it is unlike most portraits of Philip IV, in that it does not show him in his usual wholly black costume. Instead it shows him in a brown and silver embroidered costume (thus giving the portrait its name), painted with small rapid strokes, and wearing the insignia of the Order of the Golden Fleece on a golden chain. There are several pentimenti that fine tune the composition. The signature is on the letter Philip holds, a fictive petition from the painter to him. This is a sign of the importance Velázquez attached to the work, as he only signed a few of his paintings.

== Provenance ==
It was almost certainly the painting on display in the library at the Escorial outside Madrid from the mid-17th century until 1809, when it was removed on the orders of Joseph Bonaparte, who had been placed on the throne of Spain by his brother Napoleon. He presented it to a General Desolle, despite a civil servant asking him to present a less important work. Desolle's daughter sold it after the general's death to the English collector William Thomas Beckford, on whose death in 1844 it was inherited by his son-in-law, the 10th Duke of Hamilton. It was bought by the National Gallery for £6,300 at the 1882 Hamilton Palace Sale, a very high price for a Spanish painting at the time.

== Cleaning controversy ==
Kenneth Clark, the director of the National Gallery at the time, oversaw a cleaning and restoration of the Silver Philip in 1936, which created significant controversy. Clark employed art restorer Helmut Ruhemann, whose work Clark described as "far more skillful and scientific [than other restorers]", to carry out the cleaning. Clark's biographer, James Stourton, described the controversy of the "cleaning wars" at the time:

"Part of the problem was that Academicians thought that an artist should run the gallery (as indeed had usually been the case), rather than an art historian, and they actually enjoyed spats. The painting that aroused their feelings was the Velázquez portrait of Philip [IV], the so-called 'Silver Philip', that had just received the attentions of Ruhemann. The Daily Telegraph had been stirring up controversy by inviting well-known artists to voice their opinions on the subject. Critics included Alfred Munnings, William Nicholson, and Frank Brangwyn, who preferred to view the Old Masters through the golden glow of discoloured varnish, and even threatened the establishment of a Society for the Protection of Old Masters. A lot of ink was spilled on the matter of whether 'glazes' or varnish had been removed from the Velázquez. Clark defended the gallery in the letters page of The Times and Sir William Rothenstein wrote an express approval of 'the Silver Philip'...The matter rumbled on for over a year.

Neil MacGregor, the director of the National Gallery from 1981 to 1987, acknowledged that Clark had been privately concerned about the restoration, stating that Clark was, “fearful of what might be found if the golden veils of dirt and varnish were ever to be removed”. However, years after the controversy, Clark himself said, "I do not regard cleaning controversies as of any importance. They are epidemics that take place about every twenty-five years."

The picture was included in an exhibition at the National Gallery in 1947 entitled "Exhibition of Cleaned Pictures" and was displayed alongside Philip IV of Spain (also called Philip IV when Elderly), another portrait of Philip IV by Velázquez.

== See also ==
- List of works by Diego Velázquez
