= Portrait of Don Pedro de Barberana y Aparregui =

Painting attributed to Velázquez

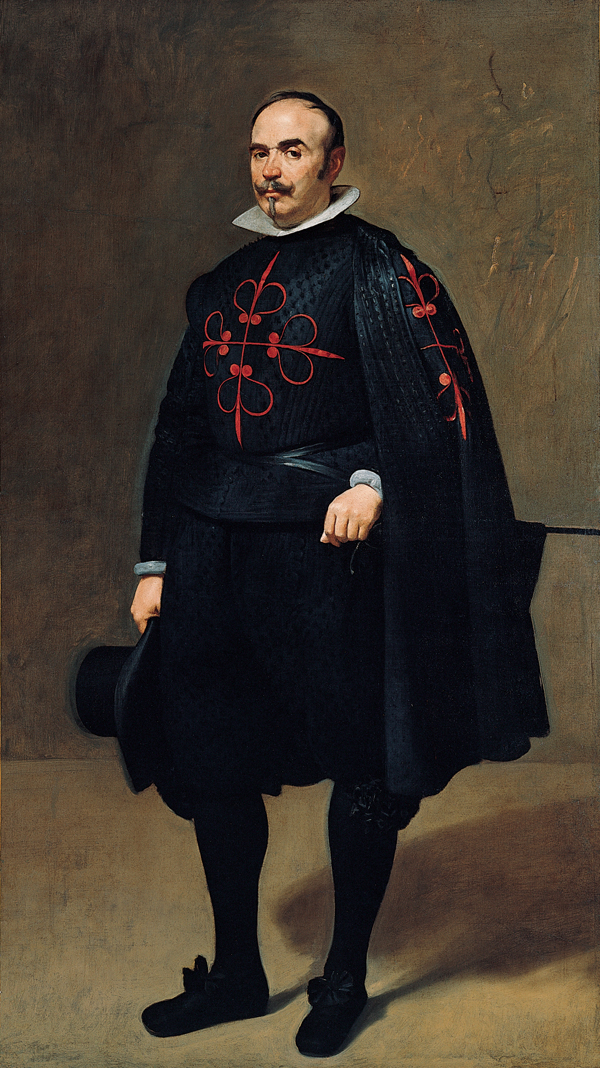

Portrait of Don Pedro de Barberana y Aparregui is an oil on canvas painting attributed to Velázquez and painted around 1631–1633. It has been in the Kimbell Art Museum in Fort Worth, Texas since 1981.

Vélasquez uses a similar technique to portray the figure's contours and the reflections on the clothing to his portraits of Portrait of Don Diego del Corral y Arellano and his wife Portrait of Doña Antonia de Ipeñarrieta y Galdós and her son don Luis. However, in this case, he makes the space more neutral by leaving it empty to reinforce the strength of the figure.

== Provenance ==
No contemporary documents survive for this full-length portrait. It is first mentioned as a Vélasquez work in 1972 by José López-Rey, who gave it the title A Knight of Calatrava. It was then in a private collection in New York. The only earlier reference to the work shows that it was bought in Europe around 1950. Other art critics supported López-Rey's conclusion and José Gudiol Ricart identified the work's subject as Pedro de Barberana (Briones, 1579- idem 1649), a lord, high treasurer and member of the royal privy council. In October 1630 he joined the Order of Calatrava, whose cross is shown on his breast and his cape. However, in October 1630 Vélasquez was still in Italy, meaning it must date from after that year.
