= The Farmers' Lunch =

1618 painting by Spanish artist Diego Velázquez

- Almuerzo de campesinos (Spanish)
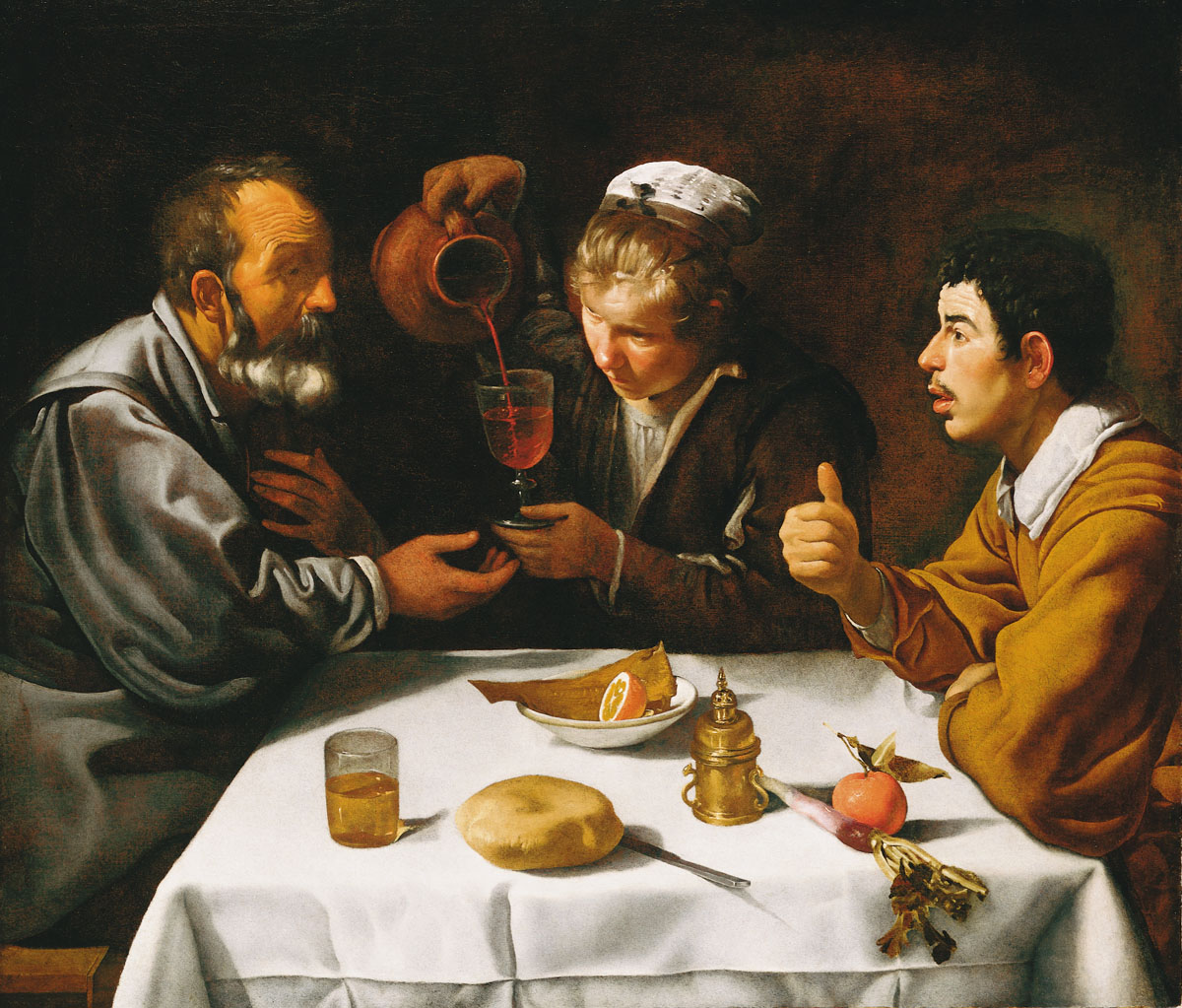
- Artist: Diego Velázquez
- Year: 1617
- Medium: Oil on canvas
- Dimensions: 96 cm × 112 cm (38 in × 44 in)
- Location: Museum of Fine Arts; Budapest

The Farmers' Lunch (Almuerzo de campesinos) is one of the earliest paintings by the Spanish artist Diego Velázquez. Painted in oil on canvas in 1617, it combines a still life of food and drink with a depiction of three comic farmers, whose physiognomy the artist studies closely. The composition shows a younger man gesturing with his right hand to reinforce the story coming from his half-open lips, and an older man listening attentively while holding his cup up to a woman so she can refill it with wine. The still life includes fish, bread, a carrot, a lemon, and a copper vessel.

The Farmers' Lunch composition is very similar to another painting by Velázquez, The Lunch (c. 1617).

== See also ==
- List of works by Diego Velázquez
