= The Kitchen Maid =

Paintings by Diego Velázquez

- La mulata / La cocinera (Spanish)
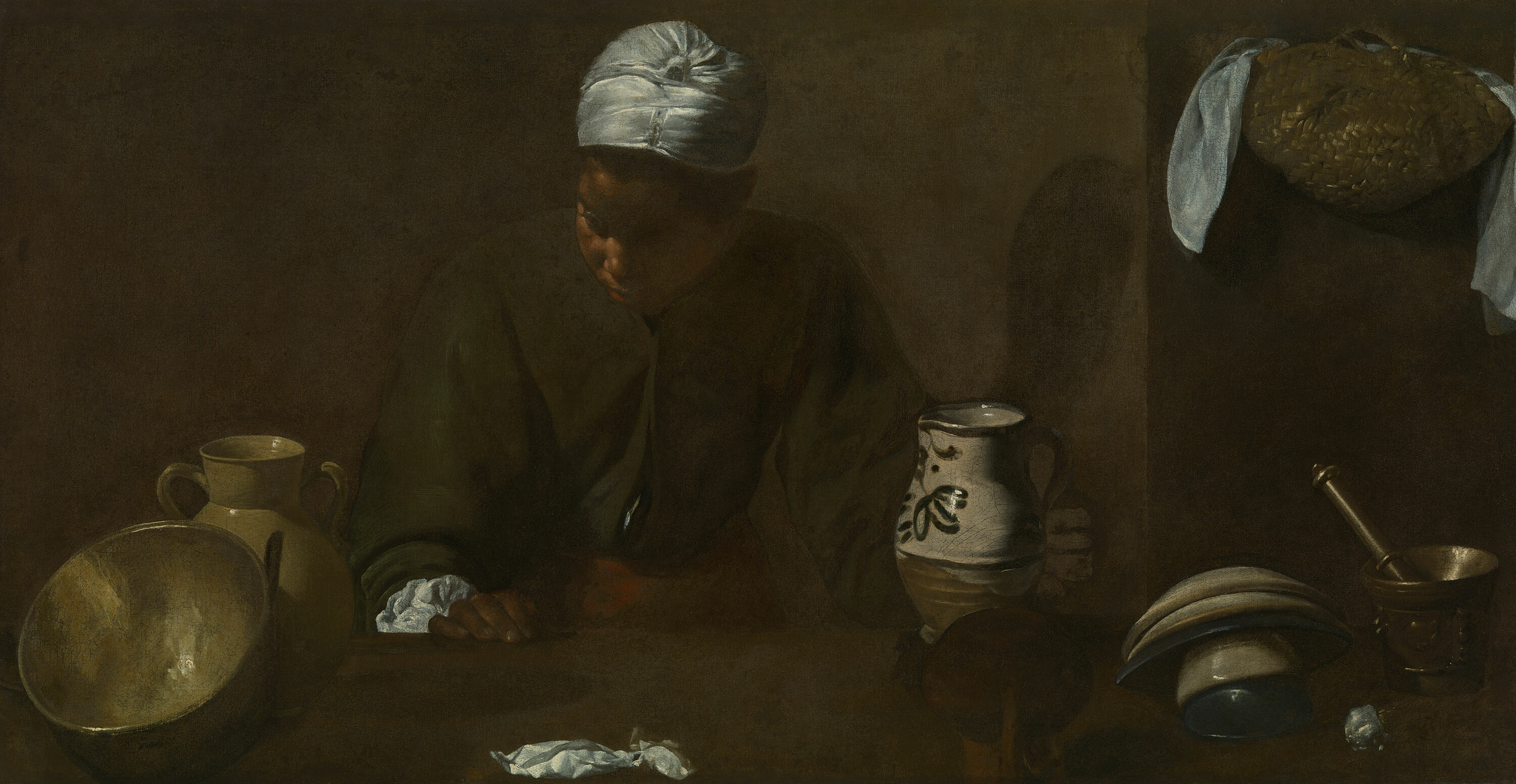
- Artist: Diego Velázquez
- Year: c. 1620–1622
- Medium: Oil on canvas
- Dimensions: 55 cm × 104.5 cm (22 in × 41.1 in)
- Location: Art Institute of Chicago; Chicago

Kitchen Maid with the Supper at Emmaus
- La cena de Emaús (La mulata) (Spanish)
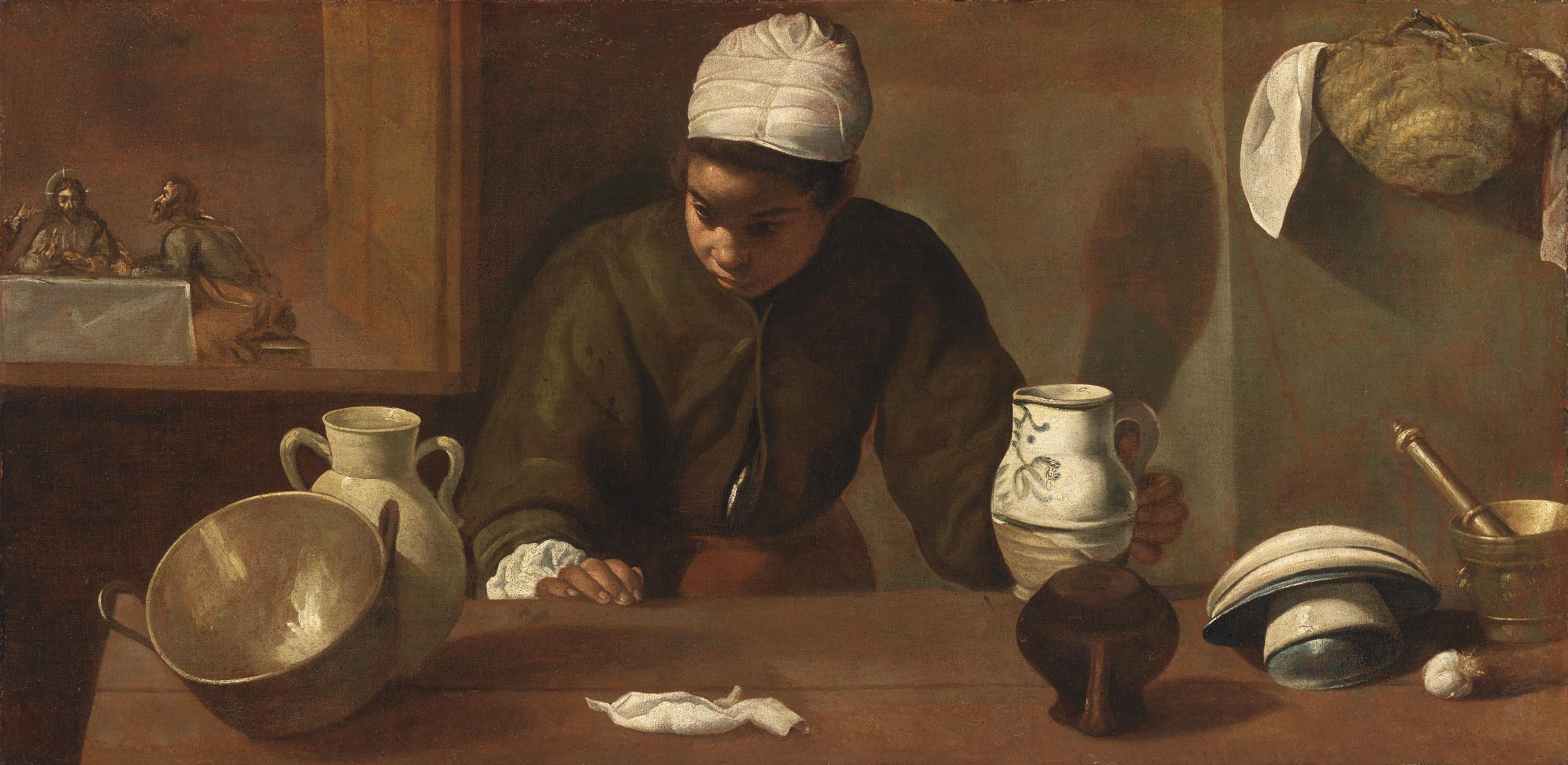
- Artist: Diego Velázquez
- Year: c. 1620–1622
- Medium: Oil on canvas
- Dimensions: 55 cm × 104.5 cm (22 in × 41.1 in)
- Location: National Gallery of Ireland; Dublin

The Kitchen Maid (in Spanish La mulata, La cocinera or Escena de cocina (Kitchen Scene)) and Kitchen Maid with the Supper at Emmaus are two paired domestic paintings by Diego Rodríguez de Silva y Velázquez from his early Seville period. A wide range of dates has been suggested for its completion, although most place it between 1620 and 1622. The first version is kept in the Art Institute of Chicago; the second version is held at the National Gallery of Ireland.

José López-Rey suggests that this picture could be related to a lost Velázquez painting described by Antonio Palomino "... where a board is seen, that serves as a table, with a charcoal burner, and a pot boiling on top, and covered with a bowl, and the fire is visible, the flames, and the sparks are clearly visible, a small tin saucepan, an alcarraza, some plates, and some basins, a glazed jug, a mortar with its pestle and a head of garlic next to it; and on the wall there is small basket and a cloth hanging from a hook, and other trinkets; and guarding this is a boy holding a jug, wearing a coif, who with his humble clothes represents a subject that is very ridiculous and amusing". The Dublin version was bequeathed by Alfred Beit in 1987. A 1933 cleaning revealed a depiction of Jesus’ supper at Emmaus on the wall behind the main figure.

The Chicago painting was bought from the Goudstikker gallery in Amsterdam by August L. Mayer and presented to the Institute in 1927. It was at the time thought to be the Velázquez original, relegating the Beit painting to the status of a copy. A number of art experts agreed with this opinion, including Bernardino Pantorba and José Gudiol, however, López-Rey recognized that the painting in Dublin came from the hand of Velázquez, casting doubt on the originality of the painting in Chicago due to its poor state of conservation. The Velázquez expert Jonathan Brown agreed with this reasoning, suggesting that the Chicago painting was “possibly” painted by Velázquez. He also suggested that the picture might be a copy produced by an artist who "wanted to draw on the success of genre paintings by Velázquez and who might have produced a large number of replicas and versions of the originals".

The Chicago painting was restored in 1999 by Frank Zuccari. Despite paint losses, the best conserved parts show a similar quality, and in some aspects a superior quality, to the Dublin version. No trace has been found suggesting that the painting might have at any time had any religious significance or that it is anything other than a painting of a mulatto maid working in a kitchen. The painting contains a number of features that confirm its technical superiority over the Dublin version. In the Chicago version there are a greater number of folds on the upper part of the girl’s coif and the treatment of the associated light and shadows is more meticulous, this is also seen in the crumpled cloth in the foreground. Superior technique is also seen in the depiction of light on the objects, particularly on the glazed ceramic jug that the maid is holding in her hand, in which it is possible to see the shine of the crackle glaze and marks left when the jug was formed on a potter’s wheel. A possible explanation for this improvement in technique is that Velázquez returned to a previous theme in order to improve on it, concentrating on the tactile qualities of the painting, which were his main interest at the time, and disregarding the religious motif.

Suggested influences for the painting include Flemish engravings by Jacob Matham. The appearance of the Supper at Emmaus in the Dublin version has led some authors to suggest a possible influence by Caravaggio, although this is uncertain as it is difficult to establish whether works by the Italian painter or by his contemporaries could have reached Seville and for Velázquez to have been familiar with them.

In 2018 the Museum of Fine Arts, Houston, announced the discovery of a third version: this one is similar to the Chicago version but 'cropped' at left and right to an almost square format.

== See also ==
- List of works by Diego Velázquez

== Bibliography ==
- Brown, Jonathan (1986). Velázquez. Painter and courtier. Madrid: Alianza Editorial. ISBN 84-206-9031-7.
- Catálogo de la exposición (2006). De Herrera a Velázquez. El primer naturalismo en Sevilla. Bilbao Sevilla: Museo de Bellas Artes de Bilbao-Fundación Focus Abengoa. ISBN 84-89895-14-7.
- López-Rey, José (1996). Velázquez. Catalogue raisonné, vol. II. Colonia: Taschen Wildenstein Institute. ISBN 3-8228-8731-5.
- Marías, Fernando (1999). Velázquez. Pintor y criado del rey. Madrid: Nerea. ISBN 84-89569-33-9.
- Palomino, Antonio (1988). El museo pictórico y escala óptica III. El parnaso español pintoresco laureado. Madrid : Aguilar S.A. de Ediciones. ISBN 84-03-88005-7.
