= Salvador Salort-Pons =

Spanish-born American art historian (born 1970)

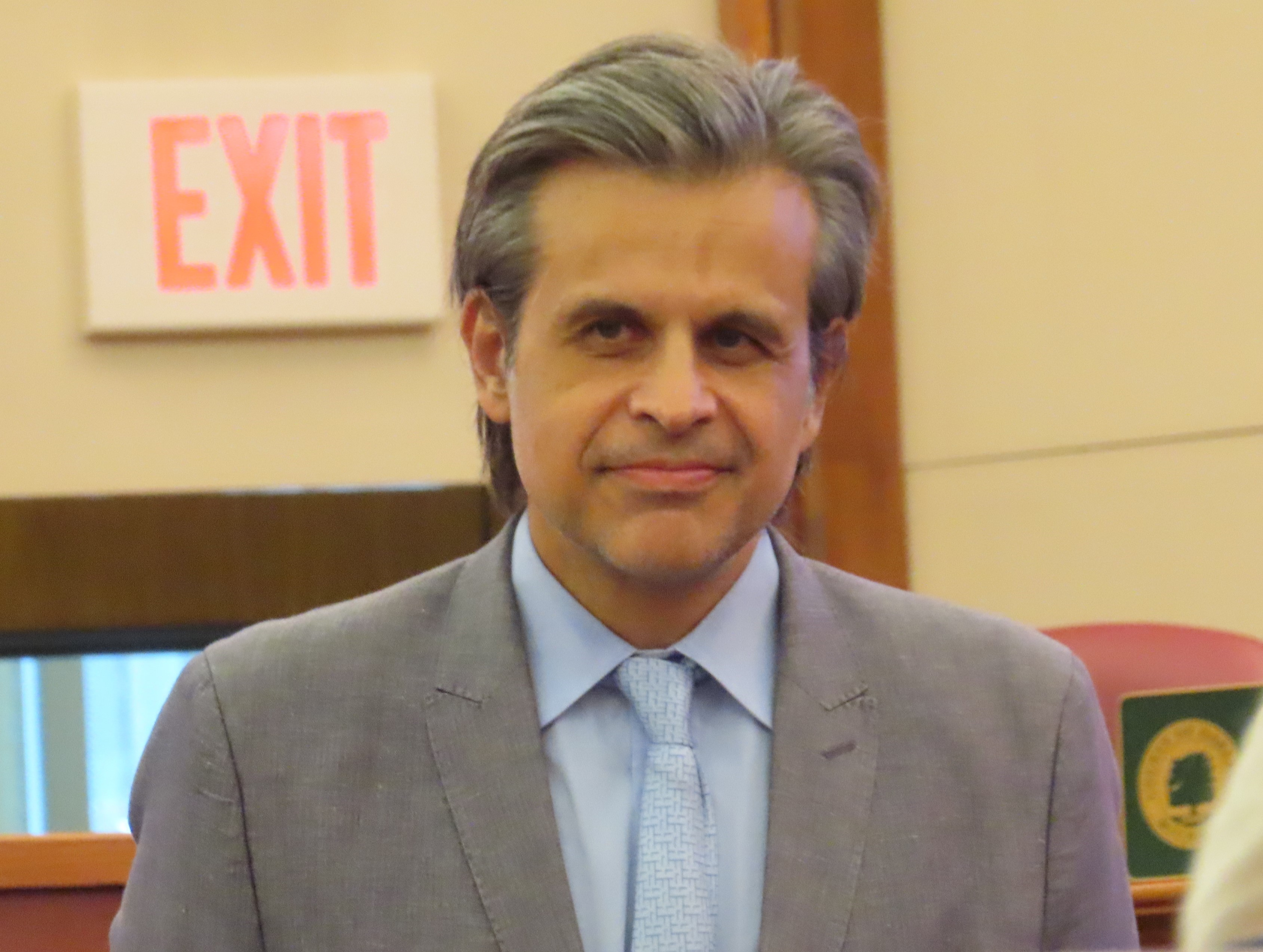
- Salort-Pons in 2022
- Born: April 18, 1970 (age 56); Madrid, Spain
- Occupation: Museum director
- Spouse: Alexandra Salort-Pons
- Children: 2

Salvador Salort-Pons (born April 18, 1970) is a Spanish-born American art historian and museum director. Since 2015, Salort-Pons has served as the Director of the Detroit Institute of Arts.

== Early life and education ==
Salort-Pons was born on April 18, 1970, and raised in Madrid, Spain. In 1993, Salort-Pons graduated from the Complutense University of Madrid with a master's degree in Geography and History with a specialization in the History of Art. While studying at the Complutense University of Madrid he was taught by the former director of the Museo del Prado, Alfonso Pérez Sánchez.

In 1998, Salort-Pons was a recipient of the Rome Prize and lived and studied at the Spanish Academy in Rome for two years where he researched the presence of Spanish artists in Rome during the 17th century. In 2000, he became a member of the Royal College of Spain in Bologna where he completed his thesis about the trips Diego Velázquez made to Italy. His dissertation was published in 2002 and included over 50 new documents relating to the life and work of Velázquez during his two trips to Italy (in 1629–1630 and 1649–1651). Among Salort-Pons's discoveries was the correct dating of the Velázquez Portrait of Innocent X.

In 2006, while working at the Meadows Museum at Southern Methodist University, Salort-Pons received a Master of Business Administration from the Cox School of Business at Southern Methodist University.

== Early career ==
Salort-Pons's first curatorial job was as the exhibition curator at the Memmo Foundation/Palazzo Ruspoli in Rome. While at the Memmo Foundation, he co-curated "Il trionfo del colore: Collezione Carmen Thyssen-Bornemisza" (Rome, 2002) as well as "Velázquez" (Rome, 2001), which was the first monographic exhibition on the painter ever organized in Italy.

Until 2006, Salort-Pons served as the senior curator at the Meadows Museum of art on the campus of Southern Methodist University in University Park, Texas. During that time, Salort-Pons helped Yale professors identify an early Velázquez work depicting the education of the Virgin Mary.

== DIA early years (2008–2015) ==
In February 2008, the Detroit Institute of Arts (DIA) hired Salort-Pons as assistant curator of European Paintings. Later promoted to be the associate curator in 2011, Salort Pons embarked on a number of exhibition projects including "Fakes, Forgeries and Mysteries" (2011). As the head of the European Art department at the DIA, Salort-Pons was the in-house curator for the traveling Rembrandt and the Face of Jesus exhibition. In 2013, Salort-Pons was appointed executive director of Collections Strategies and Information, overseeing a number of key departments at the DIA, including Collections Management, Conservation, and Publications.

As a curator, Salort-Pons did extensive research on the Italian and Spanish collections of the DIA. Under his guidance, the museum acquired a number of Spanish masterpieces by artists such as Francisco de Zurbarán, Alonso Cano, Juan Valdes Leal, and Juan de Espinosa. In addition, he rediscovered a work by Bartolomé Esteban Murillo at Oakland University whose location had been lost to scholars for many years.

== DIA directorship ==
Since becoming Director in fall 2015, Salort-Pons embarked on a number of projects to try to make the DIA more like a town square. He described the future of the DIA as a place where people can gather feel welcome, represented and included. Asserting that a museum is a place for the enjoyment of the arts but also a location where people can "drink coffee and chat." Salort-Pons has repeatedly stated that his priorities directly involve increasing community interest and accessibility.

Salort-Pons also started the "Directors Cut" programming at the DIA in early 2016. That series of talks was designed "for people to get to know him and for him to hear from metro Detroiters."

Another major initiative Salort-Pons has focused on is diversifying DIA's audiences, staff and board of directors. During Salort-Pons time as director, a number of non-traditional exhibitions and programs have been scheduled at the DIA and there has been an increased focus on collecting art by African American artists.

In June 2016, Salort-Pons was conferred the Order of the Star of Italy at the rank of Officer by the Italian government for being a foreign national who aided the promotion and preservation of Italian national prestige abroad.

In a public ceremony at the DIA on August 11, 2017, Salort-Pons was naturalized as an American citizen after 13 years of living in the United States. The ceremony occurred in front of over 100 patrons of the museum and was presided over by Federal Judge Avern Cohn.

Since the end of 2017, Salort-Pons has led a project to redesign the public spaces around the DIA. Working with institutions neighboring the DIA institutions like the Detroit Historical Museum and Wayne State University, the project aims to make their shared area on Woodward Avenue into the main town square for Detroit. In announcing the Woodward plaza planning, Salort-Pons said feedback from the public and the museum's neighbors would play a vital role as the DIA looked at the best ways to connect the museum grounds to the surrounding community. The project has already received a number of grants from local institutions. The final goal of this project is to create a cohesive look and programming for the cultural district in midtown Detroit, with the DIA at the center of it.

In March 2020, Salort-Pons led the DIA during their successful bid for an early millage renewal in Oakland, Wayne, and Macomb counties. The 2020 vote saw support for the DIA millage rise to 76% in Oakland and Wayne county and to 62% in Macomb county, where the millage only narrowly passed in 2012 with 50.5% of the vote. When asked why the DIA planned on renewing the millage early, as opposed to in 2022 when it expired, Salort-Pons stated: "I think we earned the right to go back to the voters. I think we have touched the lives of so many in the tri-county area the last eight years." Salort-Pons credited the DIA's increased community engagement work since 2012 as the driving cause for the improved millage result. In reacting to the victory, Salort-Pons stated: "The DIA millage renewal will ensure the museum can continue offering free field trips and free transportation to tens of thousands of students from local schools each year and free programming for local seniors".

In a radio interview prior to the millage vote, Salort-Pons suggested that he believes with the support of the millage the DIA can reach an endowment of $600 million by the time the millage expires in 2032. This amount, in his view, would be enough for the continued financial stability of the organization.

During Salort-Pons's directorship, the DIA has organised a number of major international exhibitions. Planning for Van Gogh in America began in 2016, shortly after curator Jill Shaw joined the museum; Shaw later recalled that Salort-Pons began discussing the idea of a Vincent van Gogh exhibition with her during her first days at the DIA. Curated by Shaw and held from October 2022 to January 2023, Van Gogh in America brought together 74 works and was the first exhibition devoted to the introduction and early reception of Van Gogh's work in the United States. It marked the centenary of the DIA's 1922 acquisition of Van Gogh's Self-Portrait, the first work by the artist acquired by an American public museum, and was the largest exhibition of his work held in the United States in more than twenty years. In 2023, the DIA was voted the best art museum in the United States in the USA Today 10Best Readers' Choice Awards, retaining the top ranking for a second consecutive year in 2024.

In 2024, Salort-Pons began developing a DIA exhibition examining the early portraits of Gaspar de Guzmán, Count-Duke of Olivares by Diego Velázquez. During research for the exhibition, he was contacted in 2025 about a portrait of Olivares in a private Spanish collection that had previously been regarded as a workshop work. After examining the painting in Madrid, Salort-Pons recommended technical analysis including X-radiography, infrared and ultraviolet imaging, pigment analysis and examination of the canvas. The results, together with documentary evidence he had encountered during earlier research, led him to identify the painting as Velázquez's previously unlocated 1626 portrait of the Count-Duke of Olivares. Salort-Pons published the attribution in ARS Magazine in 2026. In September 2026, the J. Paul Getty Museum acquired the painting as a work by Velázquez, making it the first painting by the artist to enter the Getty's collection. The painting is scheduled to be shown in the DIA exhibition Velázquez & Olivares: Early Years at Court, from January 24 to July 25, 2027.

The DIA's 2027 programme also includes Caravaggio's Models: Friends, Lovers, Rivals, curated by the museum's Head of European Art, Yuriko Jackall. Bringing together approximately 25 paintings by Caravaggio, the exhibition is described by the DIA as the largest presentation of his work in North America in several decades and the first exhibition devoted to the identities and lives of the people who modelled for his paintings.

== Selected publications ==
Salort-Pons has published extensively about the life and work of the Spanish master Diego Velázquez.

=== Books ===
- Velázquez: his third journey to Rome, exh cat. (2001; edited with Vicente Garín Llombart; Rome, Fondazione Memmo, Palazzo Ruspoli)
- Velázquez en Italia (2002)
- Diego Velázquez 1599 – 1660 (2008)

=== Articles ===
- "Fray Juan Rizi en Italia", Archivo Español de Arte (1999)
- "La misión de Velázquez y sus agentes en Roma y Venecia 1649 -1653", Archivo Español de Arte (1999)
- "Velázquez a Roma", in Velázquez a Roma. Velázquez in Roma, exh. cat. in Anna Coliva, ed (2000; Roma, Galleria Borghese)
- "Velázquez and Giulio Sacchetti: Two unpublished portraits of the King and Queen of Spain", The Burlington Magazine (2001)
- "Hipótesis de reconstrucción de la biblioteca de Alonso Cano` in María del Mar Villafranca", in Alonso Cano: espirtualidad y modernidad artística, exh.cat. María del Mar Villafranca, ed (2001)
- "El saber de un artista: fuentes normales y literarias en la obra de Alonso Cano", in Alonso Cano: espirtualidad y modernidad artística, exh.cat. María del Mar Villafranca, ed (2001)
- "Vicente Salvador Gómez, Alonso Cano y la pintura valenciana de la segunda mitad del siglo XVII", Archivo Español de Arte (2001)
- "Fortuna e collezionismo della pittura di Velázquez in Italia", in Proceedings of the Symposium: Economy and Art, 13th – 18th centuries, Istituto Internazionale di Storia Economica "F. Datini", (2002)
- "La colección artística de don Pedro Antonio de Aragón, virrey de Nápoles (1666–1672)", Ricerche sul Seicento Napoletano (2003)
- "La legación de Francesco Barberini en España: unos retratos para el cardenal y un breve pontificio para Diego Velázquez, "clerico coniugato"`, Archivo Español de Arte (2004)
- "La llegada de Niccolò Tornioli a Roma y el malogrado mecenazgo del abad Borromeo", Antologia di Belle Arti (2004)
- "Relaciones artísticas entre las cortes de Madrid y Florencia en tiempos de Cosme III" in El viaje a Compostela de Cosme III de Medicis, exh. cat. A. Neira Cruz, ed (2004)
- "Las relaciones artísticas entre Italia y Sevilla durante el primer tercio del siglo XVII", in De Herrera a Velázquez, el primer naturalismo en Sevilla, exh. cat. Alfonso Pérez Sánchez and Benito Navarrete, eds (2005)
- "Gaspar Becerra in Florence", Archivo Español de Arte (2005)
- "Gonzalo de Liaño, dwarf and artistic agent of Philip II. Part I", The Burlington Magazine (2006)
- "Gonzalo de Liaño, dwarf and artistic agent of Philip II. Part II", The Burlington Magazine (2007)
- "Coleccionismo y patronazgo de los marqueses de Castel Rodrigo, Livio Odescalchi y Savo Mellini: el mercado artístico madrileño hacia 1680", in.; Sapienta libertas: escritos en homenaje al profesor Alfonso E. Pérez Sánchez, María Condor Orduña, ed. Madrid (2007)
- "Se bene è cosa ordinaria (...), sarà gratissimo";, un ciborio di alabastro in dono a Filippo II di Spagna", Rassegna Volterrana (2008)
- "Travels of a court Jester: Gonzalo de Liaño, art agent at the court of king Philipp II of Spain"in Double Agents. Cultural and political brokerage in early modern Europe, Marika Keblusek, ed.(2011)
- "A letter of introduction for Velázquez in Bologna", The Burlington Magazine (2012)
- "Las Descalzas Reales’ The Tribute Money, by "Titian" in Arte del dono. Scambio culturale tra Italia e Spagna 1550–1650", Studi della Bibliotheca Hertziana; 8. – Pubblicazioni della Bibliotheca Hertziana Istituto Max Planck per la Storia dell’Arte, Roma (2013)
- "Ein Hofnarr als Agent : zum diplomatischen Geschenkwesen am Hof Philipps II", in Materielle Grundlagen der Diplomatie, Mark Häberlein; Christof Jeggle (Hg.), Konstanz [u.a.] (2013)
- "Portrait of a Man by Velazquez at the Detroit Institute of Arts", in El Joven Velazquez, edited by Benito Navarrete, Sevilla (2015)
