= The Lady with a Fan (Velázquez) =

Painting by Diego Velázquez

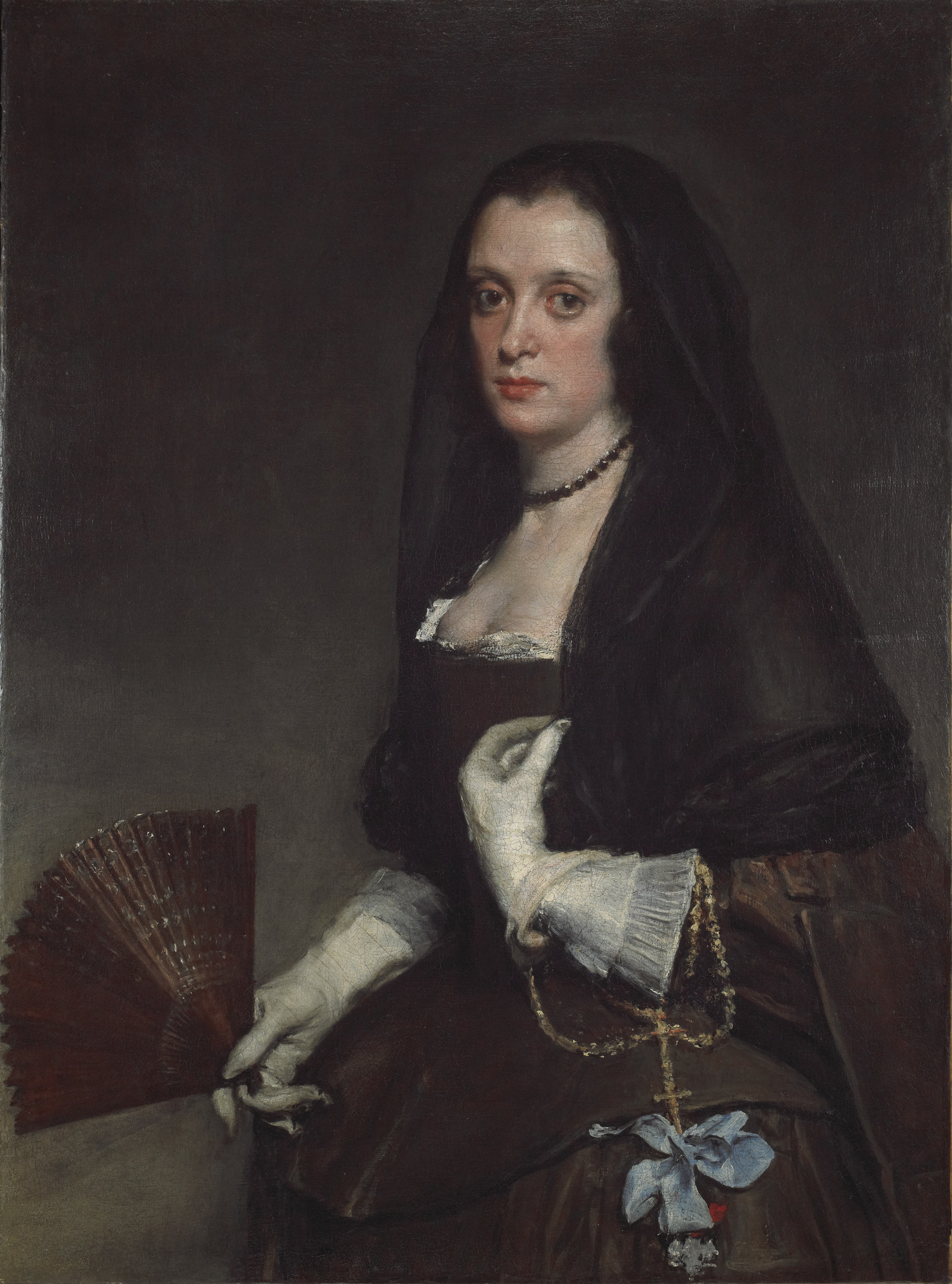
- Artist: Diego Velázquez
- Year: ca. 1638—1639
- Type: Oil on wood
- Dimensions: 92.8 cm × 68.5 cm (36.5 in × 27.0 in)
- Location: Wallace Collection, London

The Lady with a Fan is a major oil painting by the Spanish court painter Diego Velázquez. It depicts a woman wearing a black lace veil on her head and a dark dress with a low-cut bodice. On the basis of its place in Velázquez's stylistic development, the portrait is thought to have been painted between 1638 and 1639. It is now in the Wallace Collection in London.

== The sitter ==
The Lady with a Fan is an enigmatic portrait. Although most other Velázquez portraits are easily recognizable likenesses of the members of the Spanish royal family, their courtiers and court servants, the sitter in Lady with a Fan has not yet been convincingly identified; there is a lack of accurate documentary information about the portrait. The details of the costume suggest that the sitter for The Lady with a Fan could be Marie de Rohan, the duchess of Chevreuse (1600–1679), because she was dressed according to French fashion of the late 1630s. There is one piece of evidence that Velázquez painted a Frenchwoman, a letter dated January 16, 1638, which stated that he once portrayed the exiled duchess of Chevreuse, who was then living in Madrid under the protection of Philip IV, after having escaped from France disguised as a man. But some experts argued that no resemblance could be discerned with other portraits of the duchess, and it was assumed that the costume of the woman in The Lady with a Fan revealed a Spanish tapada, which was a precursor to the majas of the 18th century.

== Ownership ==
The Lady with a Fan was first recorded in the collection of Lucien Bonaparte in the early 19th century. It is believed that Bonaparte acquired it in Spain when he was there in 1801. But because there was no earlier record of the painting in any Spanish collection, it is also possible that he acquired it either in England or in Italy, where he spent most of the period of the Napoleonic Wars, or even in France, where Bonaparte met the then duke of Luynes, a direct descendant of the duchess of Chevreuse. Bonaparte's collection was sold in 1816. After further sales, in 1847 the painting was bought by Richard Seymour-Conway, 4th Marquess of Hertford (1800-1870), and on his death passed to his son Sir Richard Wallace and so to the Wallace Collection.

== Lady in a Mantilla ==
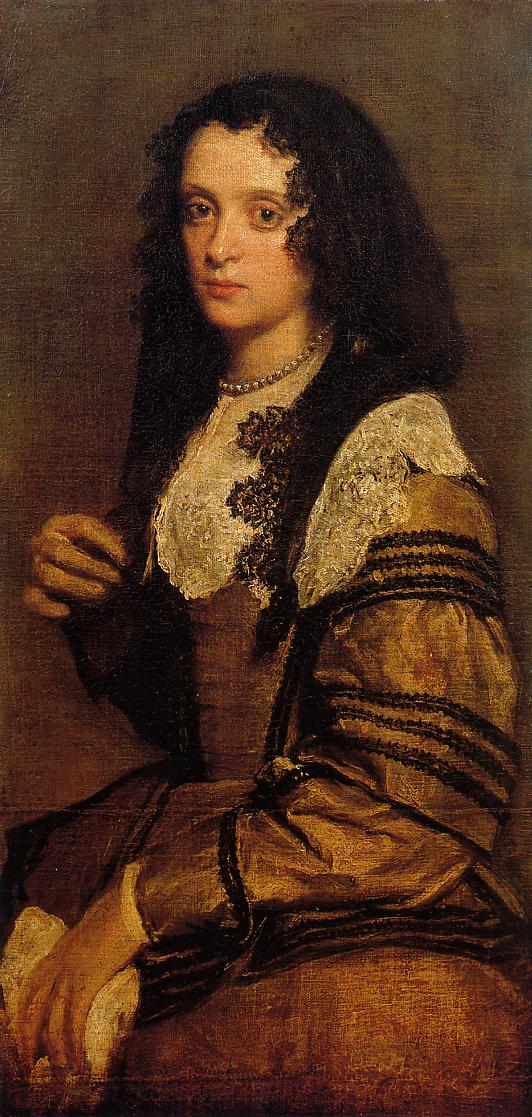
Lady in a Mantilla (Chatsworth House).

There is a variant of the portrait, the Lady in a Mantilla, in the Devonshire collection. It has been in England since the eighteenth century. (Inventories record the painting having been in the collection of the 7th Marquis of Carpio, a seventeenth-century Spanish aristocrat, and the collection of Lord Burlington).

This version is normally on display at Chatsworth House in Derbyshire, though the two were exhibited together at the Wallace Collection in 2006.

== See also ==
- List of works by Diego Velázquez

== Bibliography ==
- Zirpolo, Lilian (1994). "Madre Jeronima de la Fuente and Lady with a Fan: Two Portraits by Velazquez Reexamined". Woman's Art Journal. 15 (1). Woman's Art Journal, Vol. 15, No. 1: 16–21. doi:10.2307/1358490. JSTOR 1358490.
