= Portrait of Don Luis de Góngora =

1622 painting by Diego Velázquez

Don Luis de Góngora
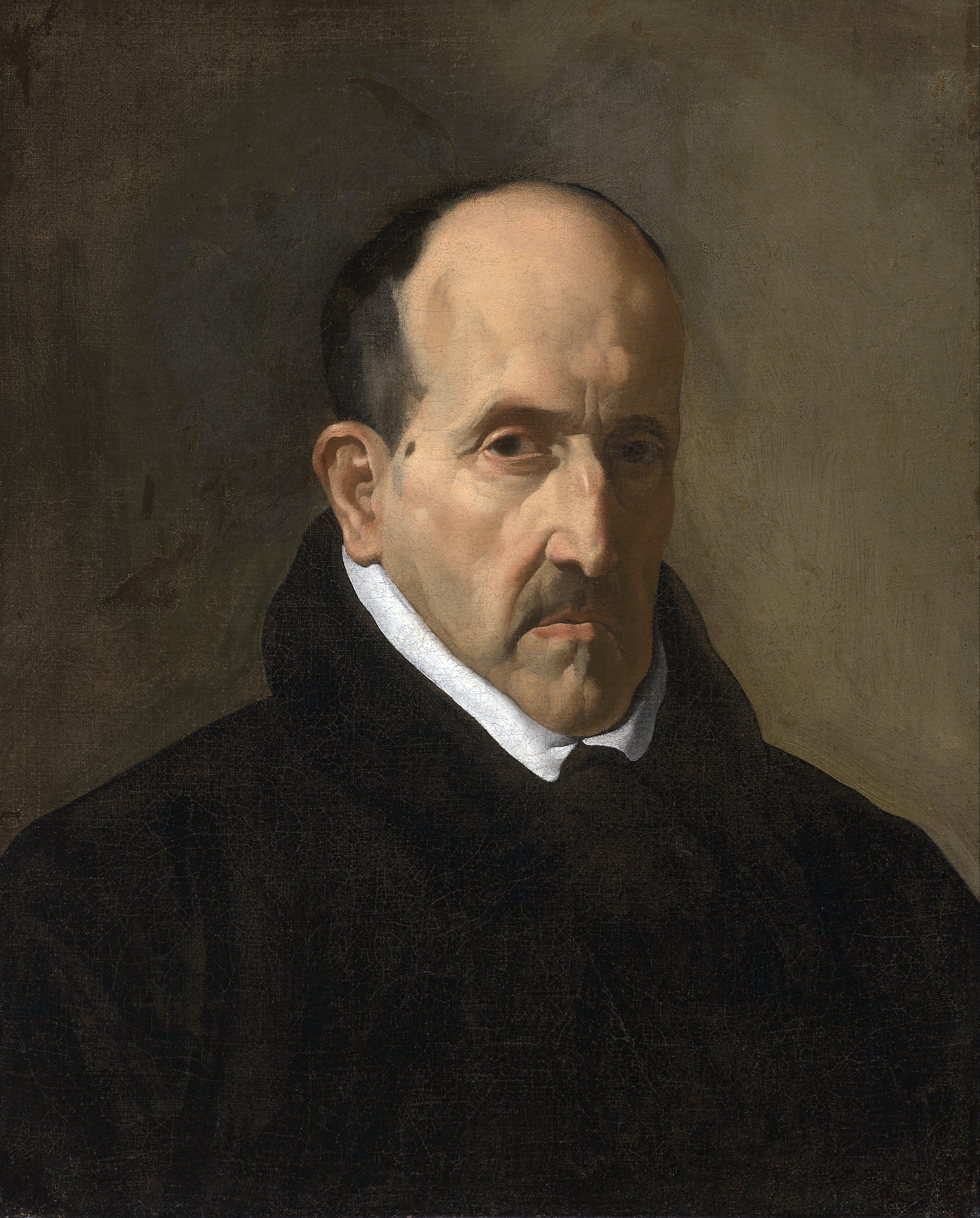
- Artist: Diego Velázquez
- Year: 1622
- Medium: Oil on canvas
- Dimensions: 51 cm × 41 cm (20 in × 16 in)
- Location: Museum of Fine Arts, Boston

Portrait of Don Luis de Góngora is a 1622 painting in oils of the poet Luis de Góngora by Diego Velázquez. It is influenced by Caravaggio, especially in its chiaroscuro, and also applies lessons Velazquez had learned in Italy, such as the rich palette as used by Titian. It is now in the Museum of Fine Arts, Boston. The portrait was commissioned with the assistance of Velázquez's teacher, Francisco Pacheco.

There are two other versions of this portrait of uncertain attribution. One is held by the Museo Lázaro Galdiano, Madrid, and the other by the Prado.

Antonio Palomino also affirmed that the portrait had been "highly celebrated by all the courtiers", although he warned that it was painted "in that way of his, which degenerates from the last". Juan de Courbes took it as a model for the print that appears on the frontispiece of José Pellicer's work, Lecciones solemnes a las obra de don Luis de Góngora y Argote, Madrid, 1630. A portrait of Góngora was among Velázquez's possessions at his death (no. 179 of his inventory) and the same or a copy was found in 1677 in the collection of Gaspar de Haro y Guzmán, Marquis del Carpio, acquired with other works by Velázquez from the same collection by Nicolás Nepata in 1692.

== See also ==
- List of works by Diego Velázquez
