= Enrique Lafuente Ferrari =

Spanish art historian (1898–1985)

Enrique Lafuente Ferrari (23 February 1898–25 September 1985) was a Spanish art historian, specialising in Spanish painting, mainly Velázquez, Goya and Zuloaga.

== Early life and education ==
Born in Madrid, he studied history and pure philosophy before graduating with a history doctorate from the University of Madrid. While studying for that doctorate, he met the art historians Elías Tormo and Manuel Gómez-Moreno (coming to consider himself their pupil) as well as Claudio Sánchez Albornoz, Antonio Ballesteros Beretta and José Ortega y Gasset. He was also influenced by the German scholars Werner Weisbach and Erwin Panofsky.

== Career ==
From 1928 onwards he was a cataloguer at the Museo del Prado (como catalogador) and in the prints collection of Spain's Biblioteca Nacional. In summer 1933, as assistant professor of art history, he joined the cruise around the Mediterranean organised by Manuel García Morente. From 1942 onwards he was professor of art history at the Escuela Superior Central de Bellas Artes (Madrid). His friendship with Julián Marías allowed him to teach at universities in North America from 1952 onwards.

He became a professor at the Complutense University of Madrid and then in 1948 a member of the Real Academia de Bellas Artes de San Fernando. He died at Cercedilla.

== Work ==
- Velázquez. Complete Edition (1928)
- La vida y obra de Fray Juan Ricci (1930)
- Breve historia de la pintura española (1934 y 1953) Hay reedición de Akal, 1987.
- La pintura española del siglo XVII (1935)
- La interpretación del barroco (1941)
- Iconografía lusitana. Retratos grabados de personajes (1941)
- The paintings and drawings of Velázquez (1943)
- La vida y el arte de Ignacio Zuloaga (1950, 1972, 1990)
- La fundamentación y los problemas de la historia del arte (1951, 1985)
- Belén imaginario (1951)
- Goya y el grabado español (1952)
- El libro de Santillana (1955, 1981, 1999)
- Goya. Gravures et Litographies. Ouvre Complète (1961)
- De Trajano a Picasso (1962)
- La vida y el arte de Evaristo Valle. Diputación Provincial de Oviedo (1963)
- Museo del Prado. Pintura española de los siglos XVII y XVIII (1964, 1969)
- Velázquez en el Museo del Prado (1965)
- Velázquez (1966)
- Velázquez: príncipes e infantes (1969)
- Museo del Prado. Pintura italiana y francesa (1967)
- Museo del Prado. Del Románico a el Greco (1968)
- Goya (1968)
- Goya: mujeres en el Museo del Prado (1968)
- Historia de la pintura española (1971)
- Ortega y las artes visuales (1971, 1972)
- Un autógrafo amatorio de Lope de Vega (1973)
- Museo del Prado. La pintura nórdica (1977)
- Los Caprichos de Goya (1978, 1984)
- Los frescos de San Antonio de la Florida (1979)
- Goya, dibujos (1980, 1988); Goya, Drawings (1980); Goya, Dessins (1980); Goya, Zeichnungen (1980)
- Ignacio Zuloaga (1980)
- El mundo de Goya en sus dibujos (1980, 1982)
- Las crónicas de los cruzados y el reino latino de Jerusalén (1981)
- La tauromaquia de Goya (1981)
- Las litografías de Goya (1982)
- La Real Calcografía de Madrid "Goya y sus Contemporáneos" (1984). with Juan Carrete Parrondo.
- Los Desastres de la guerra de Goya (1985)
- Antecedentes, coincidencias e influencias del arte de Goya (1987)
- Sobre la historia del grabado español (1989)
- The life and work of Ignacio Zuloaga (1991)
- El pintor Joaquín Valverde (1994)
- Velázquez o la salvación de la circunstancia y otros escritos sobre el autor (1999, 2013)
- Giovanni Battista Piranesi (2002)
