= Christ Crucified (Velázquez) =

1632 painting by Diego Velázquez

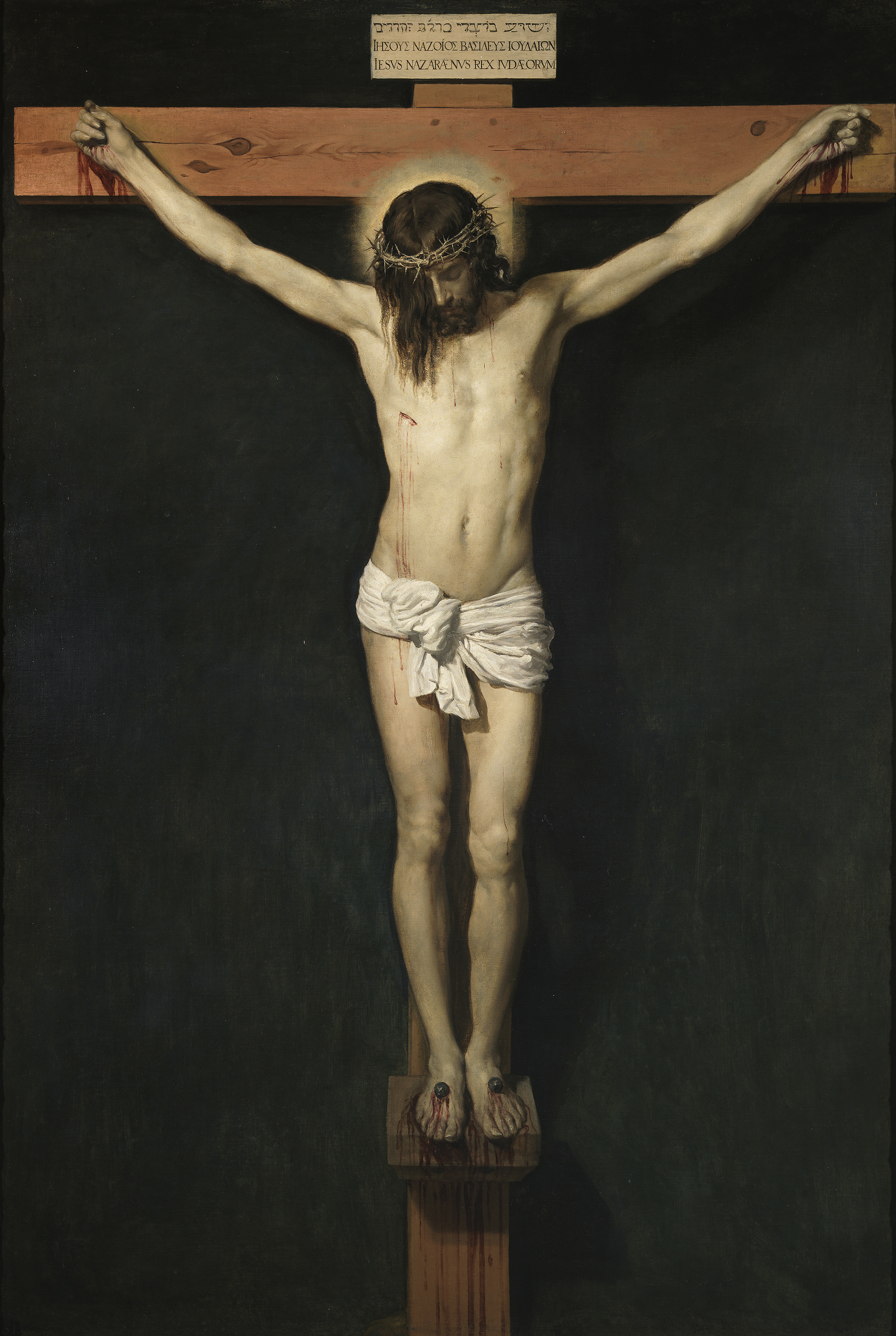
- Artist: Diego Velázquez
- Year: 1632
- Medium: oil on canvas
- Dimensions: 249 cm × 170 cm (98 in × 67 in)
- Location: Museo del Prado, Madrid

Christ Crucified or Christ of Saint Placid is a 1632 painting by Diego Velázquez depicting the Crucifixion of Jesus. It is the most famous religious painting in Spain. It was commissioned by the Benedictine nuns for the Convent of San Plácido, in Madrid. It is a very simple composition, with no other figures than Christ in the cross, drawn with perfect anatomical proportions, with only a dark green background. The work is displayed in the Museo del Prado, in Madrid.

== History ==
During his first visit to Rome between 1629 and 1631, Velázquez was able to study the paintings of the great Italian masters. The influence of his observations on the representation of the nude figure can be seen in Christ Crucified as well as in his paintings Apollo in the Forge of Vulcan (1629), Joseph's Tunic (1630) and Mars Resting (1640).

The work was commissioned for the Convent of San Plácido of the Benedictine nuns in Madrid, and is thought that it was donated by the convent founder, Jerönimo de Villanueva, the prothonotary of Aragon and one of King Phillip IV's secretaries.

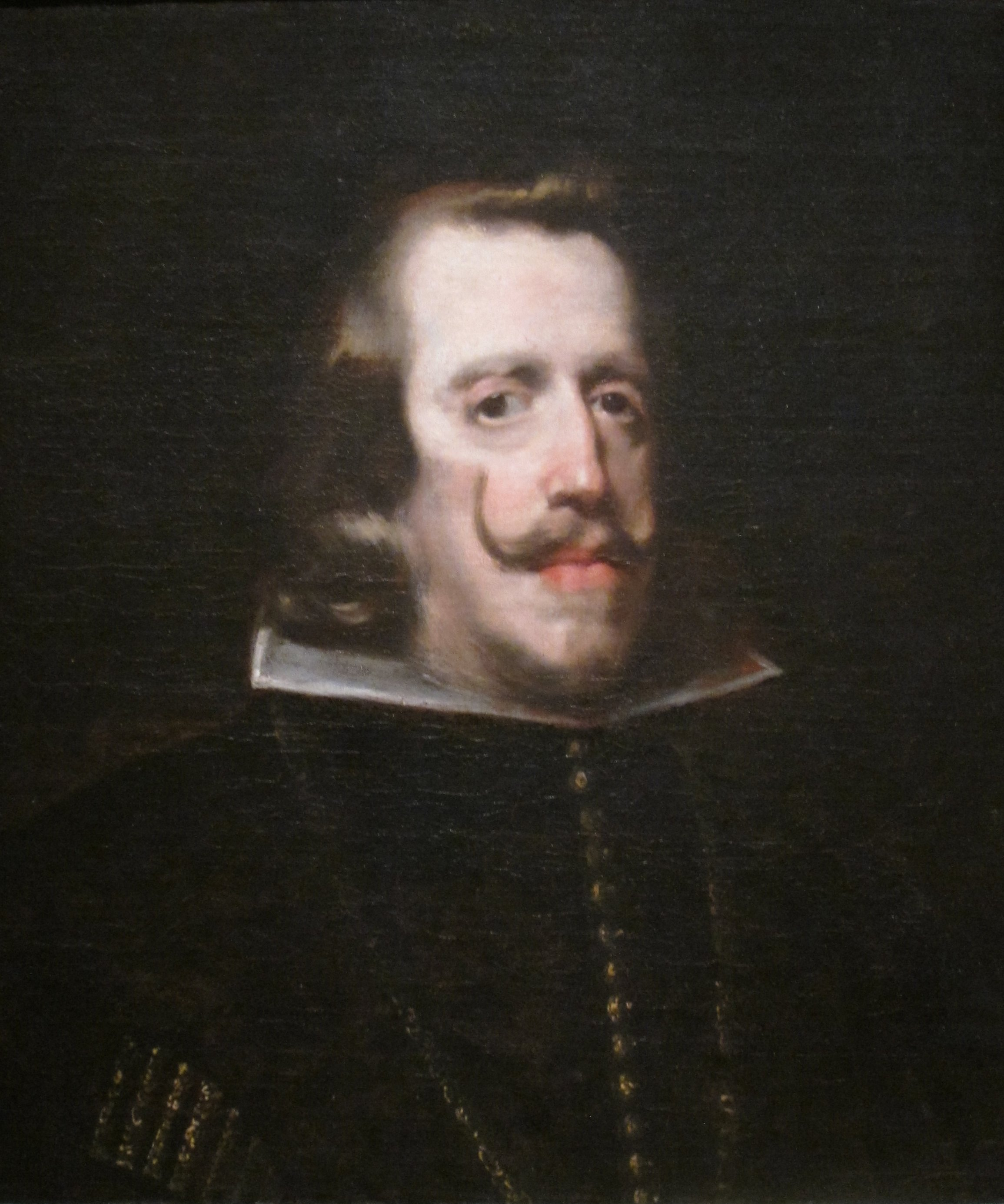
Portrait of King Phillip IV of Spain by Diego Velazquez

As Velázquez was the official court painter, he had no need to secure commissions, which mostly came from religious institutions. Therefore, his religious works are few compared to the other Spanish painters of his time. King Phillip IV and other nobles requested from him paintings to decorate their palaces, and only rarely, religious paintings. However in his few religious paintings, Velázquez demonstrated a great ability to produce works "that convey an intense religious feeling."

== Description ==
Christ is shown alone in the cross with both arms drawn a subtle curvature. His wounds are barely shown in his slender body, that is covered by a small white loincloth. A narrow halo seems to originate from the figure itself. His face is resting on the chest, showing just enough of his features in slight profile. The long, straight hair covers a great part of the face. The influence of Classicist painting is shown by the calm posture of the body, the idealized face, and the leaning head.

Velazquez's use of light and shadow creates the perception of a luminous Christ coming forward from the painting towards the viewer, an effect augmented by the bright light on the figure coming from the left and its shadow projected on the greenish-gray background.

The body is modeled with abundant Impasto, applied loosely, emphasizing the modeling and the lighting; in some parts the painter "scratched" the still-damp impasto with the tip of the brush, achieving a special texture, noticeably around the hair falling over the shoulders. As in the nudes of Apollo in the Forge of Vulcan, the shadows are obtained by going over the already finished flesh tones with very diluted brushstrokes of the same color, darkening them in irregular areas.

The anatomically proportioned body, supported by two separated open feet, creates an impression of Christ more reposed than dead. The influence of Caravaggism can be seen in the chiaroscuro between the background and the body, and in the strong, artificial lightning over the cross that provides a dramatic contrast with the dark background.

== Iconography ==
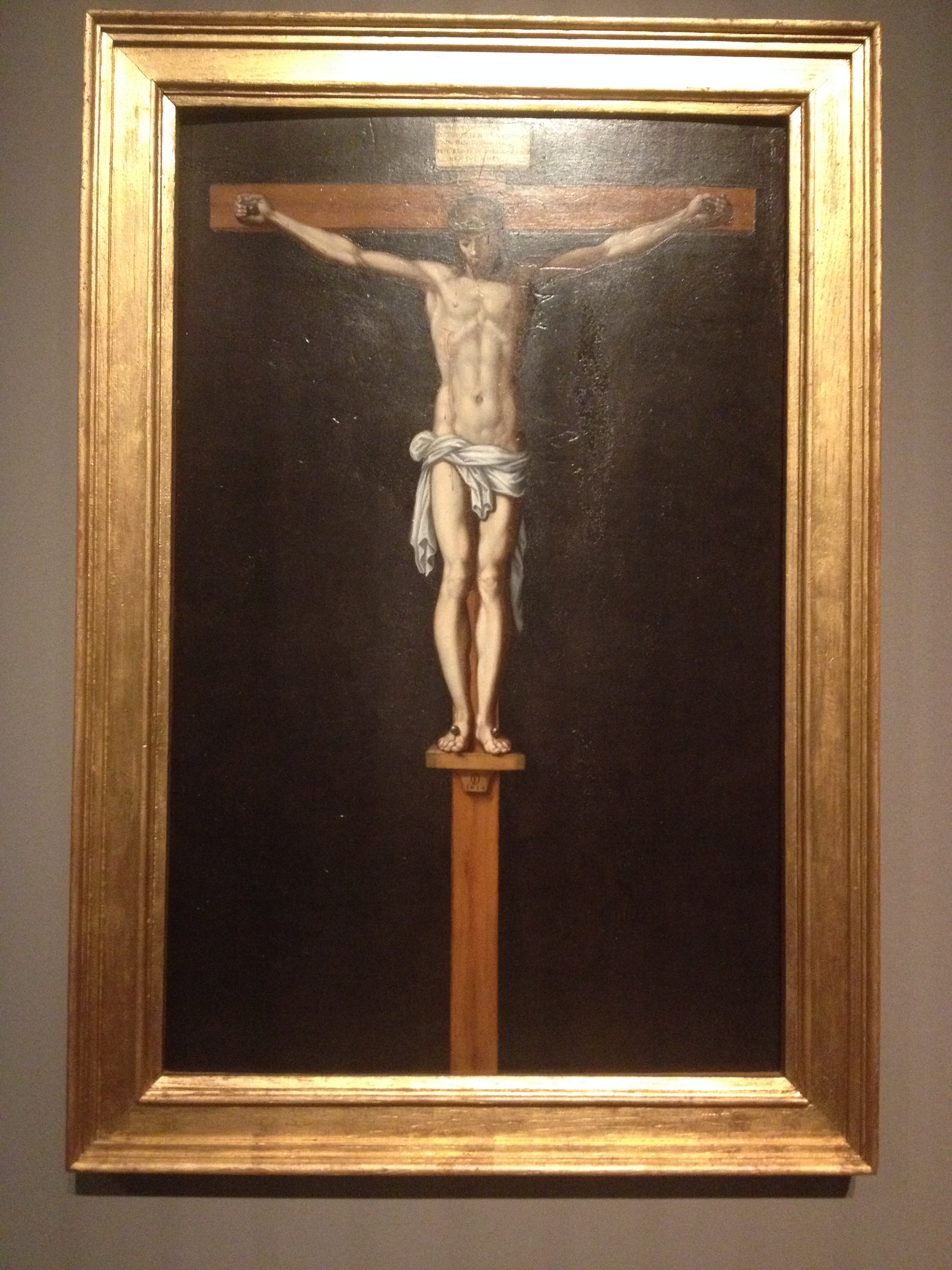
Christ on the Cross by Francisco Pacheco

Velázquez followed the accepted iconography in the 17th century. His master, Francisco Pacheco, a supporter of classicist painting, painted the crucified Christ using the same iconography later adopted by Velázquez: four nails, feet together and supported against a little wooden brace, in a classic contrapposto posture. This became a model and great influence for various artists: Velazquez, Zurbarán, and Alonso Cano. Unlike other traditional crucifixion interpretations outside of the Spanish tradition, Velazquez's work represents two parallel feet both punctured by nails. Jesus's feet are traditionally pierced with one nail with one foot over the other.

Pacheco's claim of Christ having four nails instead of three and his independent studies of the events of the crucifixion created great controversy. Pacheco and his colleagues, many of whom were Jesuits, developed analysis involving resources from contemporary writers, church fathers, and medieval mystics from the Italian and Spanish orthodoxies, supporting the idea that Jesus was crucified with a nail in each foot. Many argued Pacheco's work and influence may have created a distance from biblical evidence and his personal ideas.

== Baroque Art and the Counter-Reformation ==
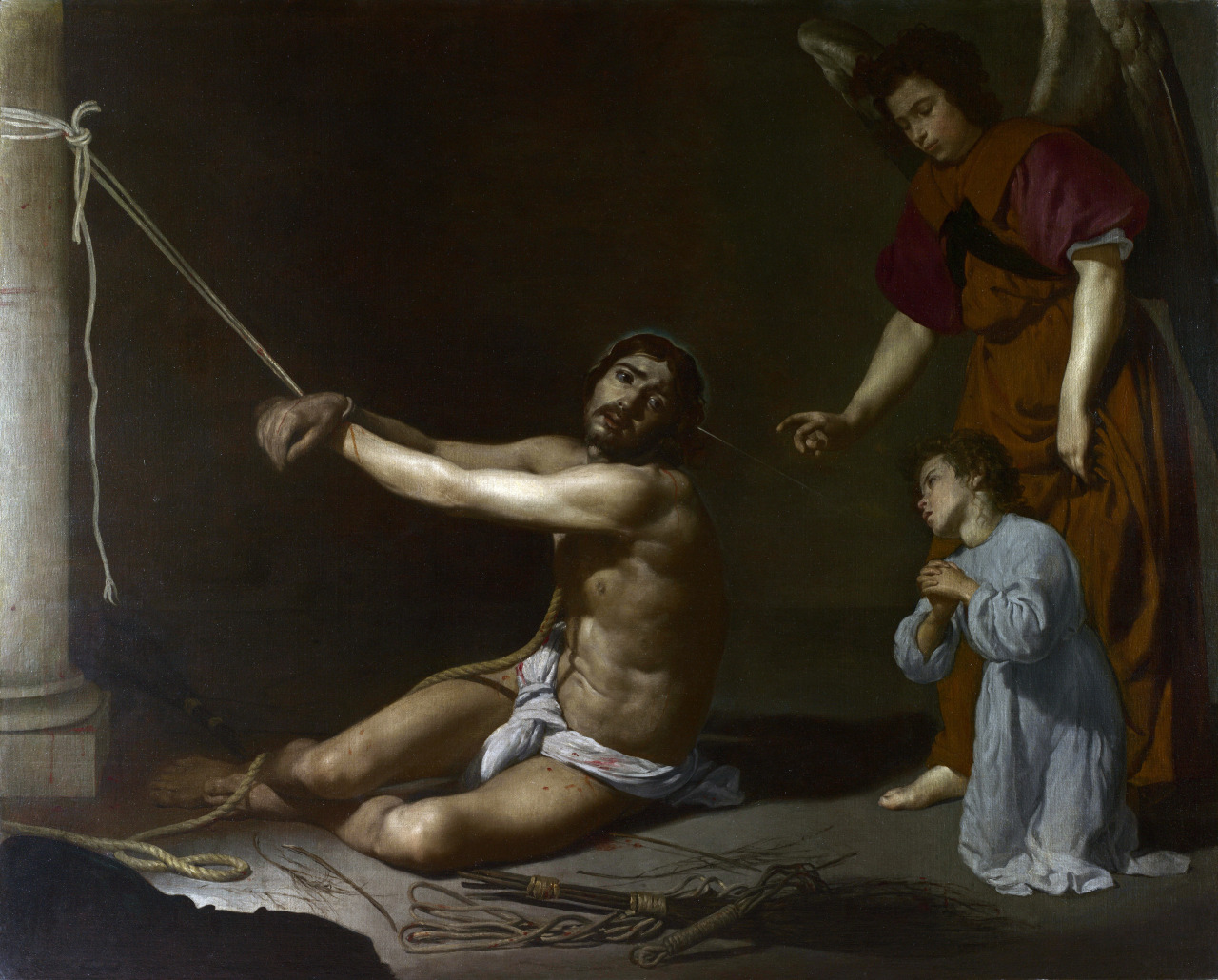
Cristo (Christ) by Diego Velazquez

The Counter-Reformation was the Catholic Church's reaction to the Protestant Reformation movement started in the early 16th century by Martin Luther in Germany and John Calvin in France.

Due to the low literacy levels, in the Council of Trent (1545-1563) the Catholic Church decided to rely on sacred art to exemplify the glory in faith as well as to generate fear on sinners and non-believers. In the 17th century, the Spanish Catholic church implemented aggressive and widespread measures, mainly through the Inquisition, to defend Christian values as a reaction to the Protestant movement, as well as to root out other religions.

The Council dictated strict norms for religious artwork. Religious art should educate the faithful, inspire devotion and accurately represent biblical narratives. The norms prohibited complex symbolism, such as dense theological allegories requiring knowledge to decode, as well as anachronistic elements not mentioned in the Bible, such as saints and the inclusion of donors, conventions prevalent in religious paintings of the 15th and 16th centuries.

Spanish art reflects both the Council of Trent's directives and the strict stance of the Spanish catholic church. The resulting Baroque art "overwhelmed the senses with its use of intense emotion, radical realism and dynamism."

To accomplish this, Spanish painters used techniques such as chiaroscuro and religious figures in theatrical gestures. Art was required to move the viewer to repentance. If a painting of the Crucifixion didn’t make you want to pray, it was failing its purpose.

With its intensely dramatic depiction and spare composition, Velázquez's Crucified Christ can be seen as an example synonymous with the Council of Trent's mandates for religious art. This could be in part due to the fact that Francisco Pacheco served as veedor (overseer) of religious painting for the Inquisition in Seville while Velázquez was still his apprentice (and later his son-in-law).

== Legacy ==
The spirituality and mystery of this painting have inspired much religious writing, notably the long poem El Cristo de Velázquez (facsimile of 1st Ed.) by the Spanish poet and philosopher Miguel de Unamuno.

In St Louis, Missouri, the Basilica of St Louis, King of France has a replica of Christ Crucified above the altar. It was commissioned by Cardinal Joseph Ritter in 1959 and painted three times the size of the original, by Charles F. Quest.

== See also ==
- List of works by Diego Velázquez

== Bibliography ==
- (in Spanish) Historia general del arte, Tomo XIII, colección Summa Artis, La pintura española del siglo XVII. Author, José Camón Aznar. Editorial Espasa-Calpe. Madrid 1977
- (in Spanish) La pintura en el barroco José Luis Morales y Marín Espasa Calpe S.A. 1998 ISBN 84-239-8627-6
- (in Spanish) Museo del Prado. Pintura española de los siglos XVI y XVII Enrique Lafuente Ferrari Aguilar S.A. 1964
- Cirlot, L. (dir.), Museo del Prado II, Col. «Museos del Mundo», Tomo 7, Espasa, 2007.
