= Portrait of Pablo de Valladolid =

Portrait by Diego Velázquez of Pablo

Pablo de Valladolid or Portrait of a famous actor in the time of Philip IV
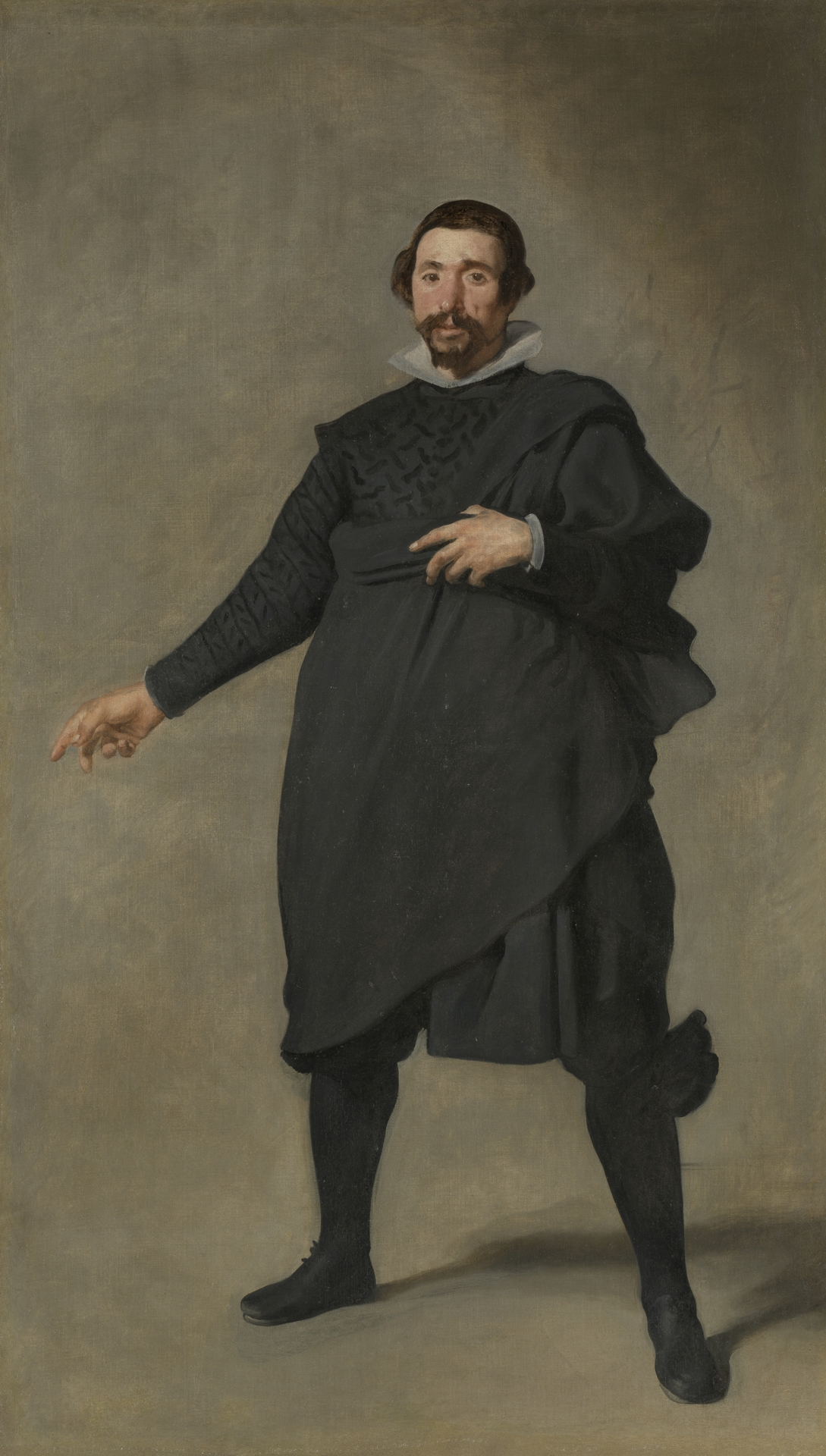
- Artist: Diego Velázquez
- Year: c. 1635
- Medium: oil on canvas
- Dimensions: 209 cm × 123 cm (82 in × 48 in)
- Location: Museo del Prado; Madrid

Portrait of Pablo de Valladolid is a portrait painted around 1635 by Diego Velázquez of Pablo or "Pablillos" de Valladolid (1587–1648), a jester and actor at Philip IV's court from 1632 until his death. It is now in the Museo del Prado, to which it was moved in 1827.

== History ==
The picture belongs to the group of portraits of jesters and "men of pleasure" of the court painted by Velázquez to decorate secondary rooms and passageways in the royal palaces. In these less important settings, the painter was able to test new expressive resources with greater freedom than in the official portraits of the royal family, with their need to portray the individuals in the best light.

In 1701 it was at the Buen Retiro Palace, where in the inventory it was described as "portrait of Vn Bufón Con golilla [a jester with ruff] called Pablillo, the one from Valladolid by Velázquez", valued with its black frame at 25 doubloons. In 1772 and 1794 it was inventoried in the Royal Palace of Madrid together with the portrait of the jester Don Juan de Austria, without mentioning the name of the portrayed subject. It went to the Academia de San Fernando in 1816, where it was known as "Portrait of a mayor", and in 1827 to the Museo del Prado, appearing in its 1828 catalogue as "Unknown Portrait". The French painter Édouard Manet, on a trip to Spain in 1865, wrote about the portrait to Henri Fantin-Latour:

Perhaps the most astonishing piece of painting that has ever been made is the picture entitled Portrait of a famous actor at the time of Philip IV (Pablillos Valladolid). The background disappears. It is air that surrounds the man, dressed entirely in black and full of life.

== Description ==
The character is portrayed, full-length and standing, with his legs spread wide, dressed in black, picks up the cape on his chest with his left hand and extends his right arm making a declamatory gesture with his hand. The silhouette is sharply outlined on a neutral background, with no other spatial reference to the point where the feet rest except by the shadow it casts, by even ignoring the faint line that in the portrait of the infant Don Carlos established the separation between the floor and the wall. In the contouring of the figure, the corrections made by the artist can be seen with the naked eye, especially in the left leg, which was initially longer.

The novelty of representing the character without a background is the feature that has stood out the most times in this portrait, considered "revolutionary" by Julián Gállego as it portrays the jester with resources more typical of a heavenly vision, as if of a saint in levitation with a golden background. Manet was impressed in particular by way in which Velázquez painted the background, which he described as "possibly the most surprising fragment of painting that has ever been made."

The background used to be a "luminous grey", according to López-Rey, but has turned in recent years to an "abominable ochre" due to varnishes and negligent preservation. The technical study signed by Carmen Garrido, however, although it admits distortions on the surface due to varnishes and accumulated dirt, indicates that brown is the original background colour, obtained from black iron oxides, white lead and calcite with some impurities, vermilion and a large amount of binder.

== Other images of same model ==
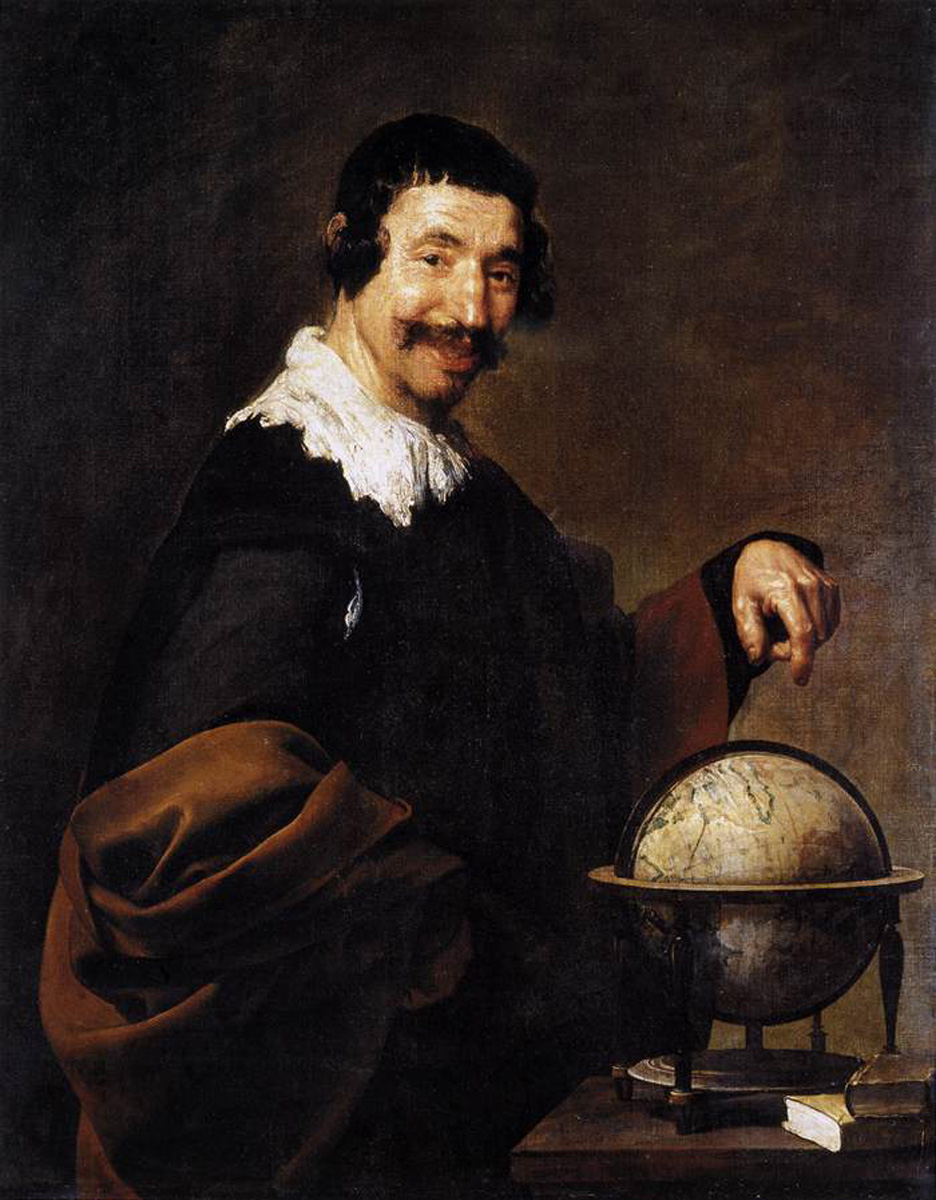
Diego Velázquez. Democritus. Musée des Beaux-Arts de Rouen

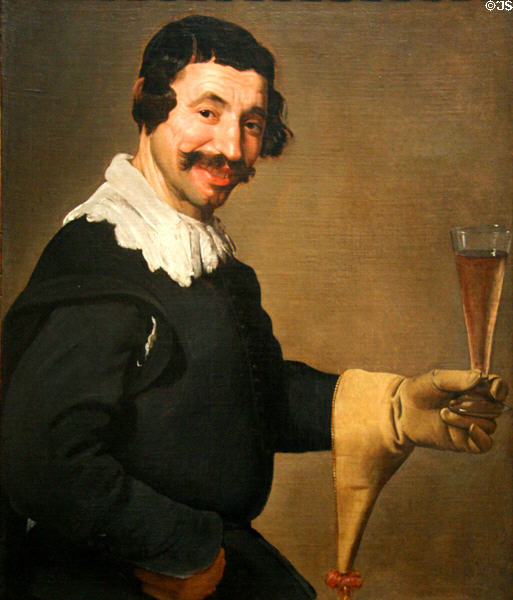
Copy after 1st version of Democritus (before repainting). Man With a Wine Glass (Allegory of Taste). C. 1630. Toledo, Ohio

== See also ==
- List of works by Diego Velázquez
