= Joseph's Tunic =

Painting by Diego Velázquez

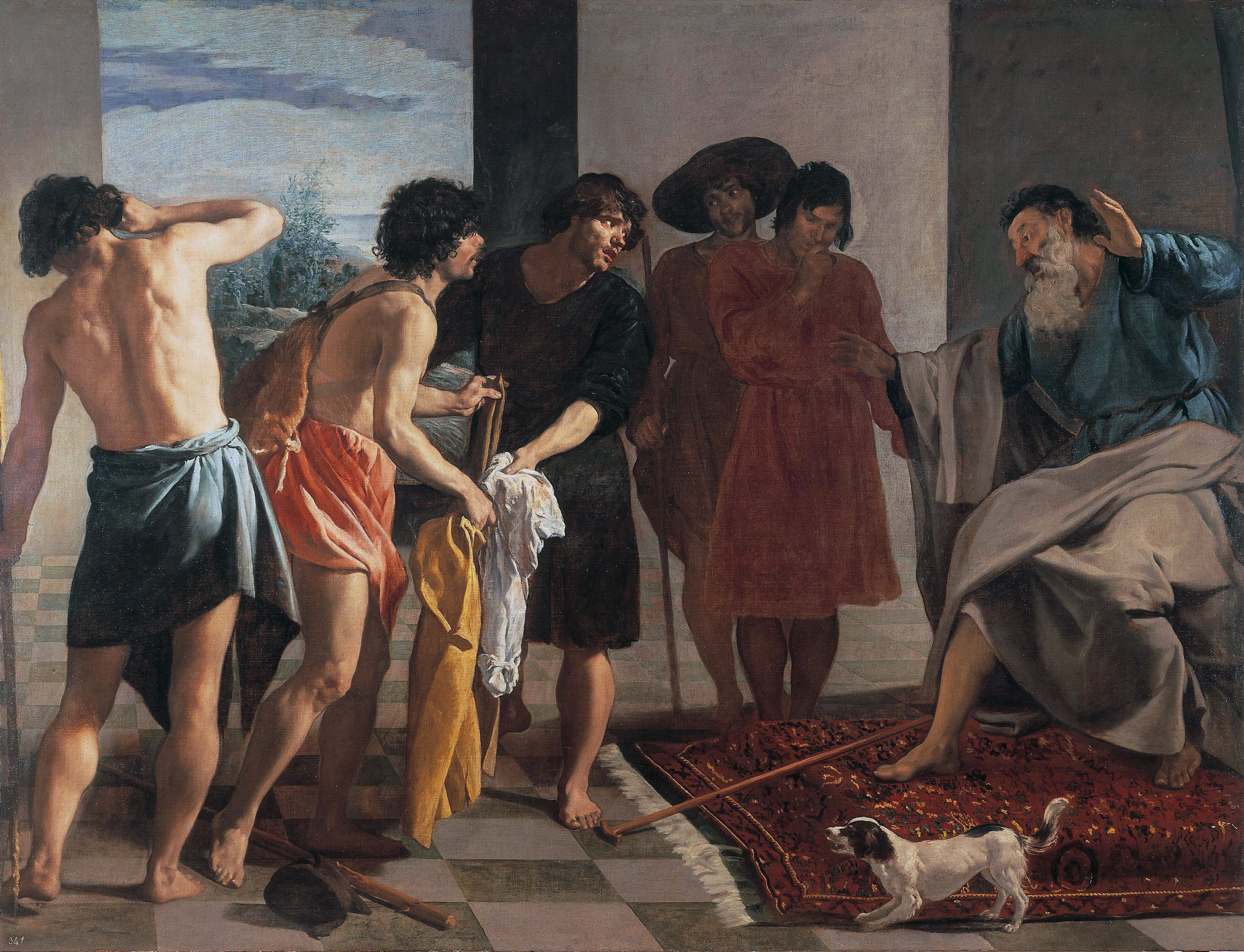
- Artist: Diego Velázquez
- Year: 1630
- Medium: Oil on canvas
- Dimensions: 223 cm × 250 cm (88 in × 98 in)
- Location: Monasterio de El Escorial; San Lorenzo de El Escorial

Joseph's Tunic (Spanish: La túnica de José) is a 1630 oil painting by Spanish artist Diego Velázquez, now held in the museum of the Sacristía Mayor del Monasterio de San Lorenzo de El Escorial (Madrid, Spain). The painting is also knowns as Joseph's Bloodied Coat Presented to Jacob. It depicts the Old Testament narrative (Genesis, 37-50) of Joseph's brothers presenting his bloody robe to their father, Jacob. Velázquez painted this work during his first journey to Rome, while staying at the house of Don Manuel de Fonseca y Zúñiga, the Sixth Count of Monterrey and Spanish ambassador to Rome. It was later brought back to Spain with Velázquez's Apollo in the Forge of Vulcan.

Despite Joseph's Tunic depicting a biblical story and Apollo in the Forge of Vulcan being a mythological scene, scholars often consider the two paintings a pair. Both works were done without royal commission but were later added to the Spanish royal collection. Their connection lies in their common format, shared use of dramatic realism, and exploration of the power of words. Joseph's Tunic is particularly notable for its use of chiaroscuro, dynamic figure movement, and geometric perspective. The painting also demonstrates influences of Guercino, Caravaggio, Michelangelo, and others.

== Description ==
The scene shows the biblical narrative about the jealousy of Joseph's brothers. Five of them, angered by what they regarded as the favoritism shown toward Joseph, sold him to an Ishmaelite caravan for slavery. To cover up their actions, the brothers took Joseph's robe, dipped it in goat blood, and brought it to their father Jacob. The painting shows the moment when the five brothers present the robe to Jacob. Upon recognizing the garment, Jacob is overcome with grief, devastated by his belief that his son had been devoured by a wild beast.

Velázquez positions two of the brothers, thought to be Reuben and Simeon, in the center of the scene, presenting the coat to Jacob. Their expressions convey a mix of both concern and unease. To their left, another brother turns away completely, seemingly overcome with guilt. On the far right, Jacob is captured in a moment of grief, nearly falling out of his chair after receiving the news of Joseph's death. Jacob's dynamic position effectively conveys his extreme distress. There are also two other vaguely defined brothers in the background. Their identities are unknown. Some scholars believe Velázquez might have considered turning the space they occupy into an extension of the landscape instead. There is a small dog barking at the brothers in the bottom right corner, almost as if it can detect the dishonesty of the brothers.

== Interpretation ==
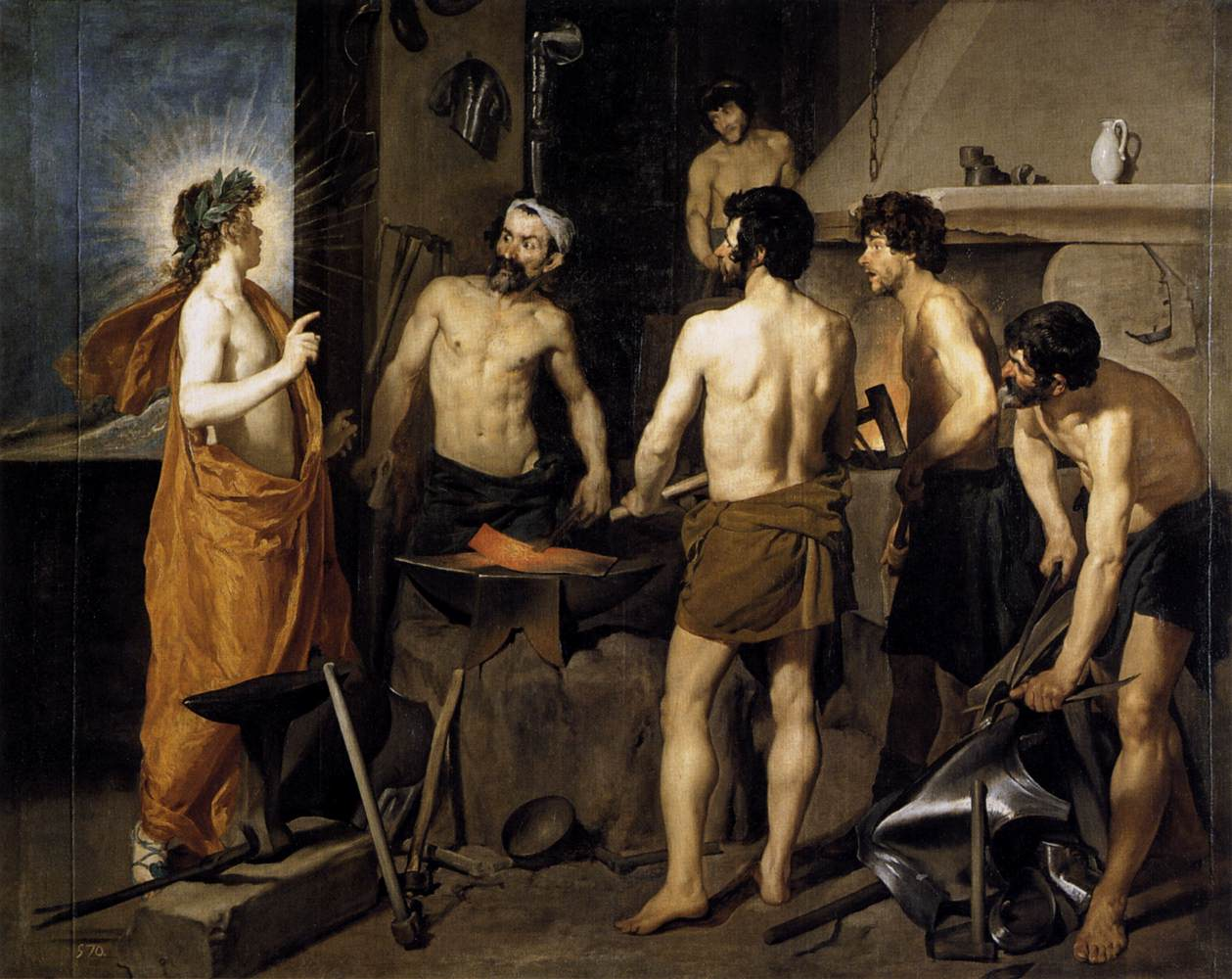
Diego Velázquez, The Forge of Vulcan, 1630

The main themes represented in the painting are deception and manipulation. The five sons presenting the bloodied coat to their father led Jacob to believe that his son was dead. In this moment, Jacob’s perception of reality is altered, highlighting how words and ideas can hold more power than concrete human actions. This theme is reinforced by the Velázquez's addition of a dog in the bottom right corner, barking aggressively at the brothers, as if to call them out on their deceit. Velázquez’s painting demonstrates how the brothers’ lie provokes Jacob’s actions and emotions, underscoring how language and storytelling affect the human experience. This theme aligns with that of the pendant painting Apollo in the Forge of Vulcan, which similarly revolves around the revelation of unsettling news.

== Styles and techniques ==
The piece is consistent with the characteristics of Spanish Baroque, as evidenced by the intense use of dark shadows and sense of movement. Velázquez utilizes chiaroscuro to convey the volume of the figures. The viewer’s attention is drawn to each of the brothers on the left, as the dramatic contrast between light and dark shadows accentuates their presence. The artist designed the checkerboard flooring in accordance with the principles of geometric perspective.

== Influences ==
Guercino

One of the most noticeable influences of Guercino can be seen in Velázquez's use of chiaroscuro. Guercino was known for using this technique in his painting to highlight certain individuals or moments, adding a layer of emotional intensity. In Joseph’s Tunic, the brothers presenting the robe are prominently highlighted compared to the other figures, mimicking this technique. Velázquez spent time in an Italian village called Cento during his travels, which is where he would have been exposed to Guercino's work.

Carravagio

Similar to Guercino, Caravaggio was known for Tenebrism, using intense shadows to heighten emotional intensity. Velázquez adapted this style in Joseph's Tunic to call attention to the brothers presenting the robe. Caravaggio also may have influenced Velázquez's sculptural representation of the bodies, his depiction of skin texture, and the natural liveliness of the figures.

Tintoretto

Tintoretto’s Last Supper contains certain elements Velázquez might have also drawn upon for influence. In this painting, Tintoretto has a tiled floor that leads to a central vanishing point on the left side of the canvas, with the space opening up to the landscape. This spatial organization is similar to Velázquez’s layout in Joseph's Tunic.

Michelangelo

Velázquez's depiction of strong, sculpted human figures could also be influenced by Michelangelo. The expressive, dynamic poses of the figures have fine physiognomic details that help create emotional intensity. In Joseph’s Tunic, Jacob and the shepherd in the background resemble the prophets Ezekiel and Jerimiah, respectively, both from Michelangelo’s frescoes in the Sistine Chapel.

Guido Reni

Joseph's Tunic resembles work by other Roman-Bolognese artists, such as Guido Reni. Velázquez arranged the shepherds' heads to create a centrifugal structure, a technique often used by Guido Reni. The dog in the foreground is also similar to the dog in an earlier painting by Guido Reni, The Abduction of Helen.

== See also ==
- List of works by Diego Velázquez
- Coat of many colors
