= Mars Resting =

Painting by Diego Velazquez, completed 1639–1640

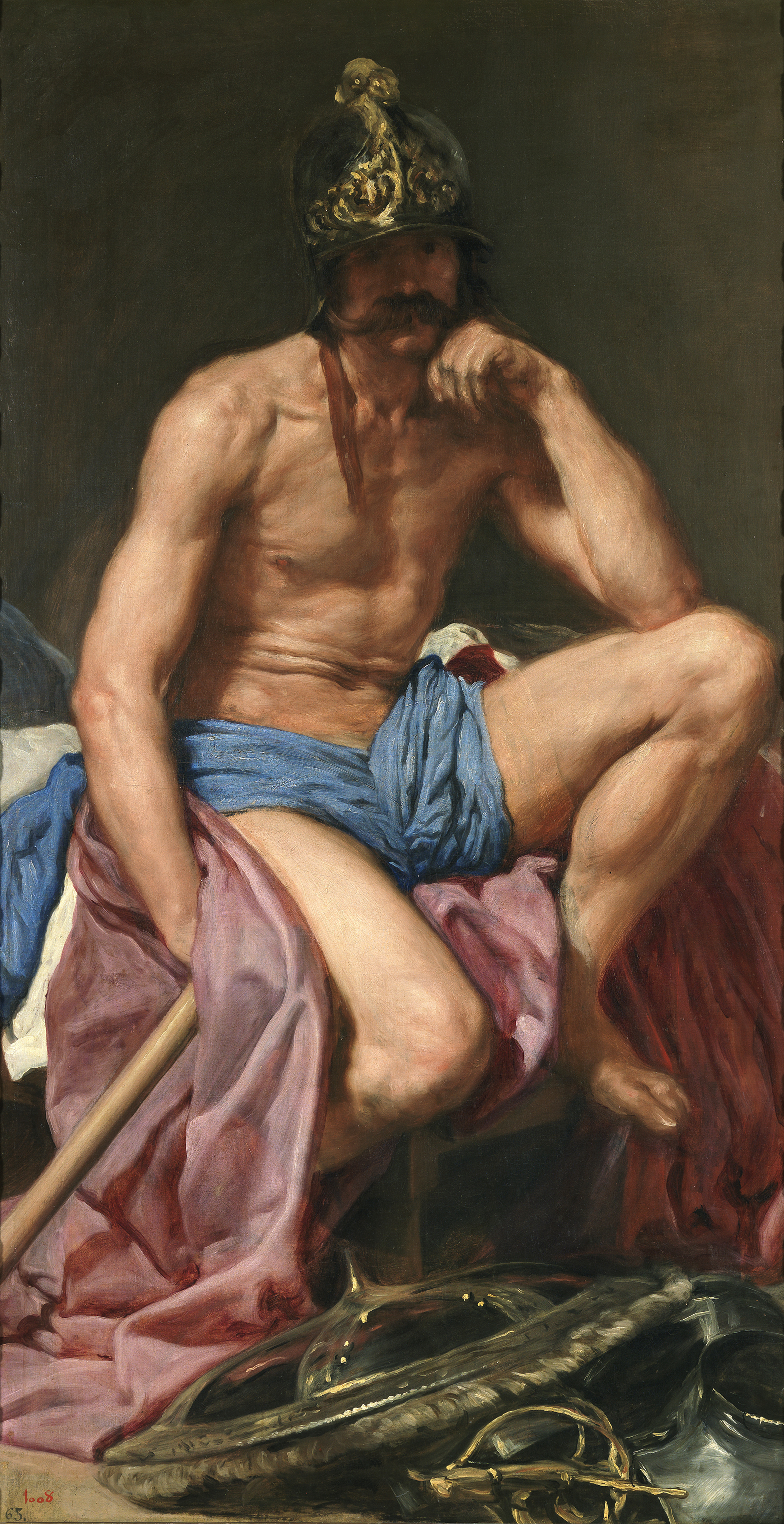
- Artist: Diego Velázquez
- Year: c.1640
- Medium: Oil on canvas
- Dimensions: 179 cm × 95 cm (70 in × 37 in)
- Location: Museo del Prado; Madrid

Mars or Resting Mars (Descanso de Marte, literally The Rest of Mars) is a 1640 painting by Diego Velázquez. It is now in the Prado Museum. It is thought to have been finished around 1639–1640, as were all paintings made by the artist to be in the Torre de la Parada for King Philip IV of Spain.

== Description and analysis of the painting ==
As an example of Baroque art, it's based in principles of symmetry, combined with, while less dramatic than other examples of the same artistic movement, the light technique of Chiaroscuro, a dark background contrasted with the source of light coming from the viewer's point of view, resulting in depth and dramatism added to the work, highlighting the nudity in such.

Being in the genre of mythological paintings, this painting is a satirical depiction of the god Mars, inspired by models such as the Hellenistic and classical Ludovisi Ares (attributed to the sculptor Scopas), and Il Pensieroso, one of Michelangelo's sculptures for the Medici in the new sacristy of the Basilica of San Lorenzo. Such are reinterpreted satirically or ironically by Velázquez, showing the god as a humanized form.

As the name implies, the god is depicted resting, an expression of contemplation, resignation, deep in thought, or perhaps one of weariness. While a god of war, which can be identified by the spear against his thigh, the discarded armor on the floor and the helmet, the deity is depicted vulnerable, in the nude, unlike his usual representations, he's not dressed for battle. A sense of decrepitude and saturnal melancholy to him. The sagging skin perhaps showcasing how the god is not as strong as it once used to be.

For Charles de Tolnay, this painting has a motive of Vanitas, saturnal melancholy suggesting that Mars is meditating the vanity of his victory, though its also possibly referencing the decaying Army of Flanders, also known as the Tercios de Flandes with the loss of the Battle of Rocroi against the French army, which could be interpreted through the moustache.

And while interesting, such an interpretation is also put to question when considered how Velázquez desired to be ennobled, with the argument that damaging the reputation of the Spanish army, no matter how frustrated he might be, could be against his own interests, alongside his loyalty to the Spanish King.

Its also debated whether the painting may represent the frustrated love with the goddess Venus, an affair that was put to an end by the god Vulcan, her husband, whom after being aware of the infidelity wove an iron mesh to surprise the lovers, as depicted in another of Velázquez's paintings Apollo in the Forge of Vulcan. White sheets behind him being where the lovers were surprised, as the god reflects in defeated sadness.

== See also ==
- List of works by Diego Velázquez
