= Old Woman Frying Eggs =

Painting by Diego Velázquez

- Vieja friendo huevos (Spanish)
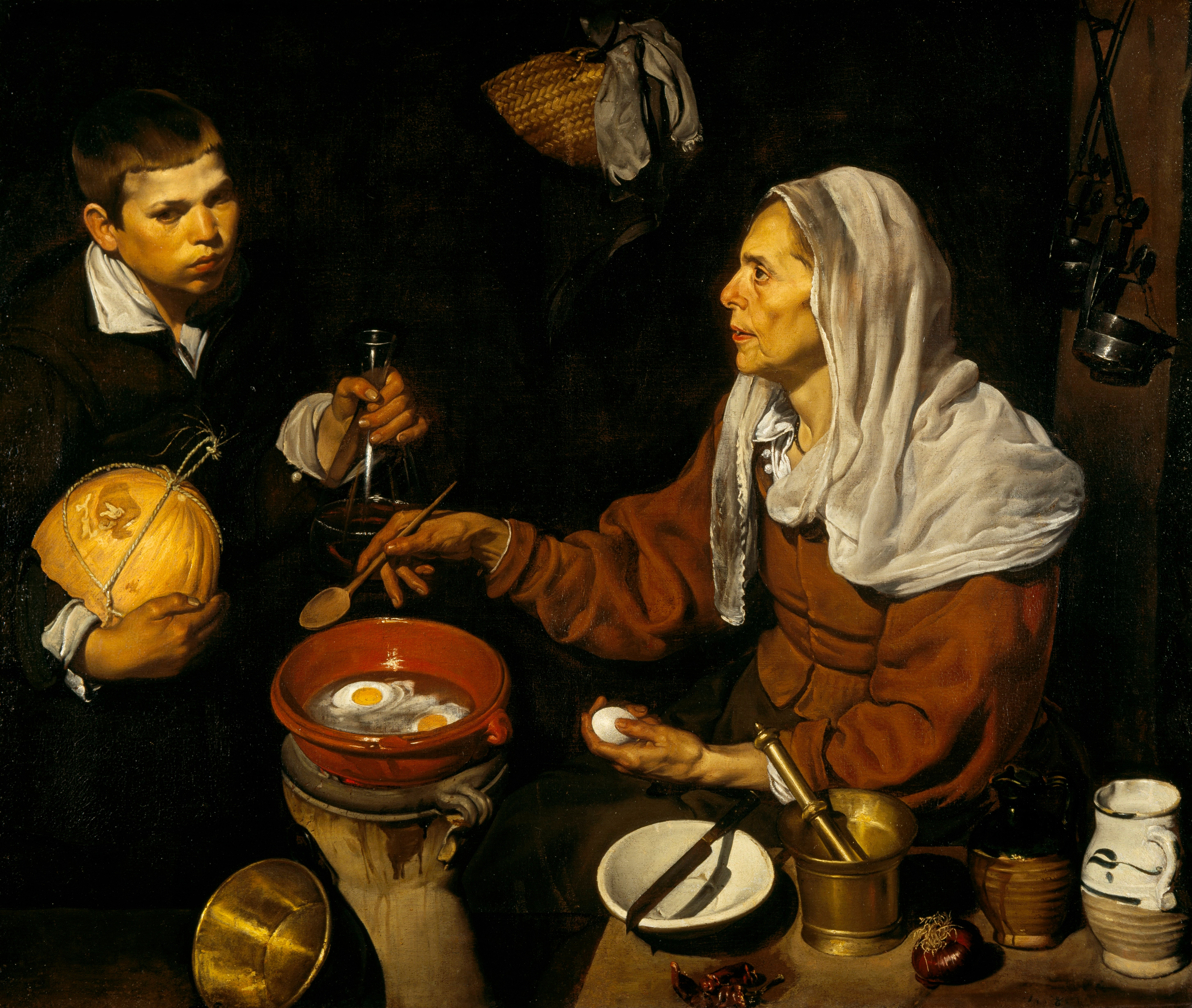
- Artist: Diego Velázquez
- Year: c. 1618
- Medium: Oil on canvas
- Dimensions: 100.5 cm × 119.5 cm (39.6 in × 47.0 in)
- Location: National Gallery of Scotland; Edinburgh

Old Woman Frying Eggs is a genre painting by Diego Velázquez, produced during his Seville period. The date is not precisely known but is thought to be around the turn of 1618 before his definitive move to Madrid in 1623. The painting is in the Scottish National Gallery in Edinburgh. Velázquez frequently used working-class characters in early paintings like this one, in many cases using his family as models; the old woman here also appears in his Christ in the House of Martha and Mary (1618). There is some dispute about what cooking process is actually depicted with some suggesting not frying but poaching, leading to an alternative title of the painting, Old Woman Cooking Eggs or Old Woman Poaching Eggs.

Old Woman Frying Eggs is considered to be one of the strongest of Velázquez's early works. Like others, it shows the influence of chiaroscuro, with a strong light source coming in from the left illuminating the woman, her utensils and the poaching eggs, while throwing the background and the boy standing to her right into deep shadow. Here the chiaroscuro is very intense, so much so that it would be impossible to see the wall at the bottom of the painting but for the basket hanging from it; it simultaneously manages to combine the murky darkness and high contrasts of light and shadow with the use of subtle hues and a palette dominated by ochres and browns. The composition is organised as an oval with the middle figures in the nearest plane, thus drawing in the viewer.

== See also ==
- List of works by Diego Velázquez
