= Diego Velázquez =

Spanish painter (1599–1660)

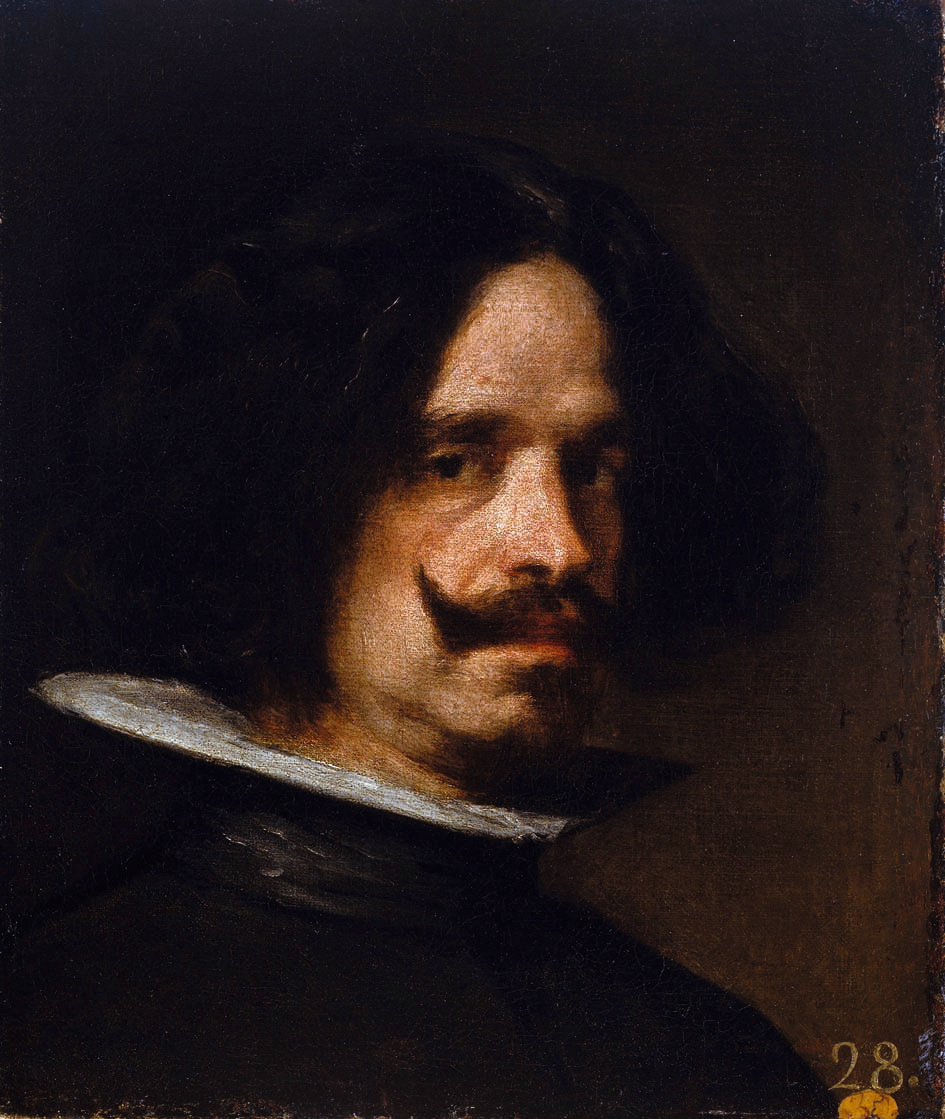
- Self-portrait, c. 1640
- Born: Diego Rodríguez de Silva y Velázquez; Seville, Andalusia, Spain
- Baptised: 6 June 1599
- Died: 6 August 1660 (aged 61); Madrid, Spain
- Known for: Painting
- Notable work: The Surrender of Breda (1634–35); Rokeby Venus (1647–1651); Portrait of Innocent X (1650); Portrait of Juan de Pareja (c. 1650); Las Meninas (1656); Las Hilanderas (c. 1657)
- Movement: Spanish Baroque
- Awards: Knight of the Order of Santiago

Diego Rodríguez de Silva y Velázquez (Note: British English: /vɪˈlæskwɪz/, American English: /vɪˈlɑːskeɪs, -k(w)ɛz, -kɪs, -kɛs/; Spanish: [ˈdjeɣo roˈðɾiɣeθ ðe ˈsilβa i βeˈlaθkeθ].) (baptised 6 June 1599 – 6 August 1660) was a Spanish Baroque painter, the leading artist in the court of King Philip IV of Spain and Portugal, and of the Spanish Golden Age. He is generally considered one of the greatest artists in the history of Western art.

He was an individualistic artist of the Baroque period (c. 1600–1750). He began to paint in a precise tenebrist style, later developing a freer manner characterized by bold brushwork. In addition to numerous renditions of scenes of historical and cultural significance, he painted scores of portraits of the Spanish royal family and commoners, culminating in his masterpiece Las Meninas (1656).

Velázquez's paintings became a model for 19th century realist and impressionist painters. In the 20th century, artists such as Pablo Picasso, Salvador Dalí, and Francis Bacon paid tribute to Velázquez by reinterpreting some of his most iconic images.

Most of his work entered the Spanish royal collection, and by far the best collection is in the Museo del Prado in Madrid, although some portraits were sent abroad as diplomatic gifts, especially to the Austrian Habsburgs.

== Early life ==
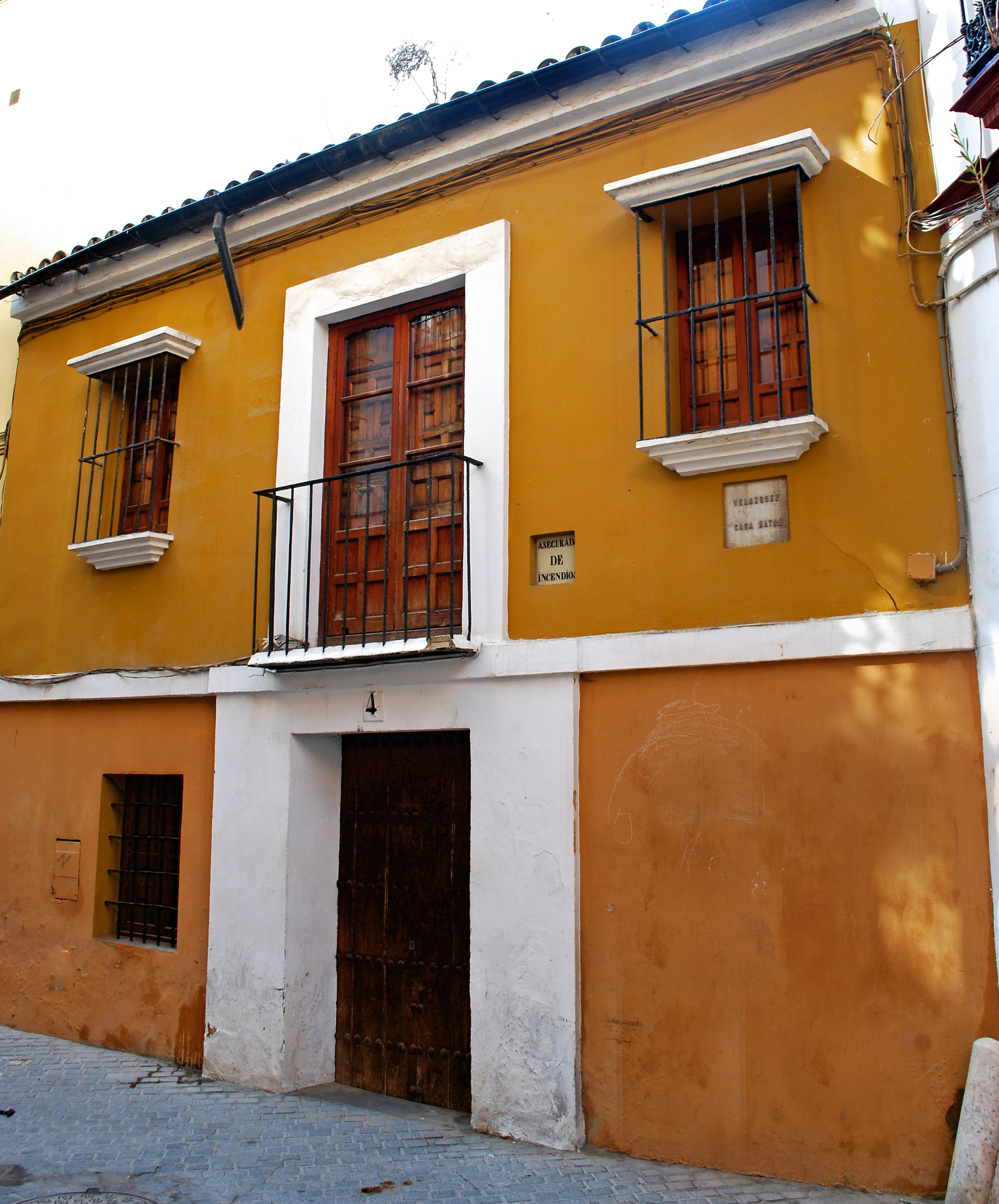
Birthplace of Velázquez in Seville

Velázquez was born in Seville, Andalusia, Spain, the first child of Juan Rodríguez de Silva, a notary, and Jerónima Velázquez. He was baptized at the Church of St. Peter in Seville on Sunday, 6 June 1599. The baptism most probably occurred a few days or weeks after his birth. His paternal grandparents, Diego da Silva and María Rodríguez, were Portuguese and had moved to Seville decades earlier. When Velázquez was offered knighthood in 1658, he claimed descent from the lesser nobility in order to qualify; however, his grandparents may have been tradespeople. Some authors have suggested that his grandparents were Jewish conversos. Rafael Cómez proposes Velázquez may have had Morisco lineage.

Raised in modest circumstances, he showed an early gift for art, and was apprenticed to Francisco Pacheco, an artist and teacher in Seville. An early 18th–century biographer, Antonio Palomino, said that Velázquez studied for a short time under Francisco de Herrera before beginning his apprenticeship under Pacheco, but this is undocumented. A contract signed on 17 September 1611, formalized a six-year apprenticeship with Pacheco, backdated to 10 December 1610, and it has been suggested that Herrera may have substituted for a traveling Pacheco between December 1610 and September 1611.

Although considered a dull and undistinguished painter, Pacheco sometimes expressed a simple, direct realism, though his work remained essentially Mannerist. As a teacher, he was highly learned and encouraged his students' intellectual development. In Pacheco's school, Velázquez studied the classics, was trained in proportion and perspective, and witnessed the trends in the literary and artistic circles of Seville.

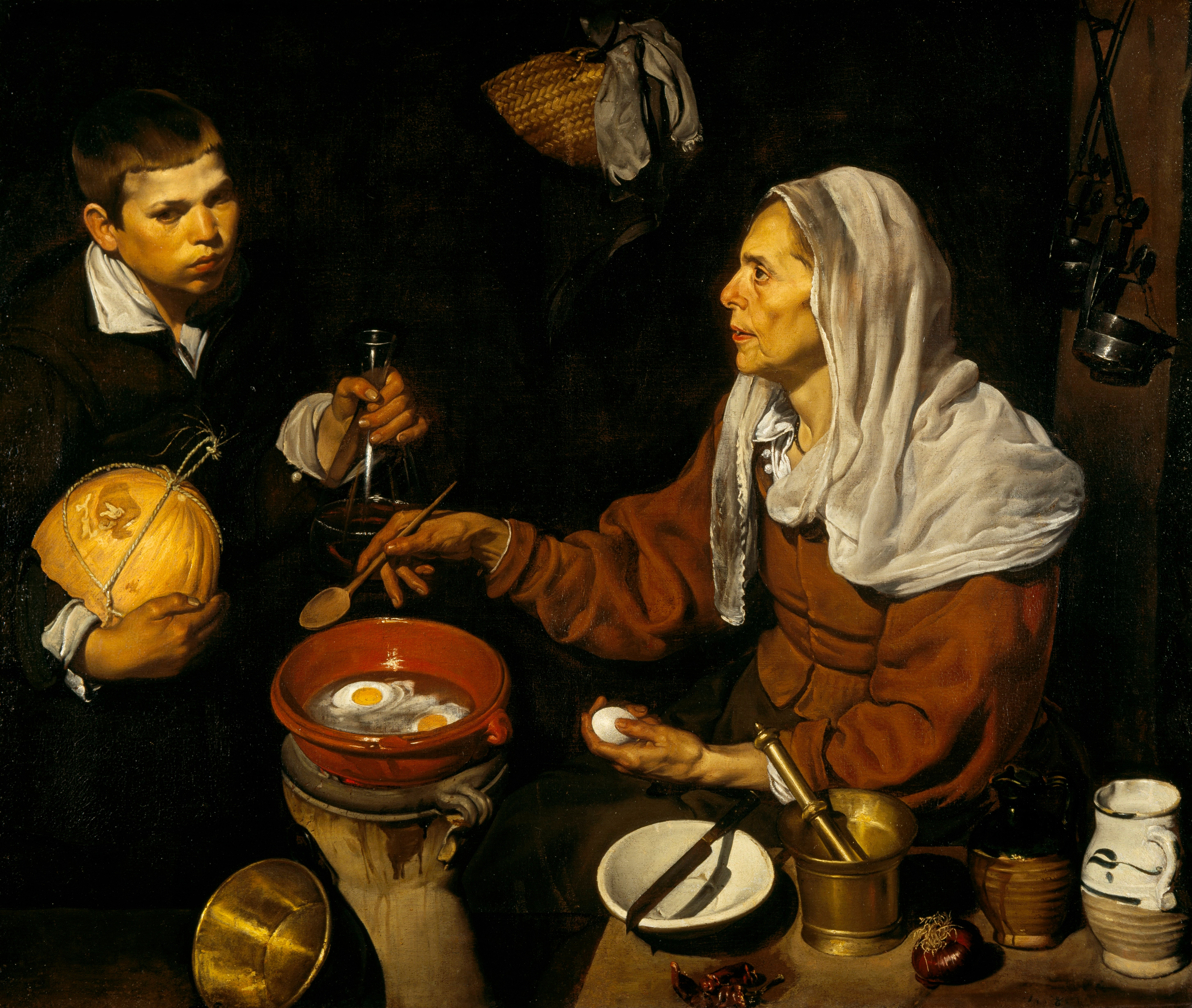
Old Woman Frying Eggs (1618). National Gallery of Scotland, Edinburgh.

On 23 April 1618, Velázquez married Juana Pacheco (1 June 1602 – 10 August 1660), the daughter of his teacher. They had two daughters. The elder, Francisca de Silva Velázquez y Pacheco (1619–1658), married painter Juan Bautista Martínez del Mazo at the Church of Santiago in Madrid on 21 August 1633. The younger, Ignacia de Silva Velázquez y Pacheco, born in 1621, died in infancy.

Velázquez's earliest works are bodegones (kitchen scenes with prominent still-lifes). He was one of the first Spanish artists to paint such scenes, and his Old Woman Frying Eggs (1618) demonstrates the young artist's unusual skill in realistic depiction. The realism and dramatic lighting of this work may have been influenced by Caravaggio's work—which Velázquez could have seen second-hand, in copies—and by the polychrome sculpture in Sevillian churches. Two of his bodegones, Kitchen Scene with Christ in the House of Martha (1618) and Kitchen Scene with Christ at Emmaus (c. 1618), feature religious scenes in the background, painted in a way that creates ambiguity as to whether the religious scene is a painting on the wall, a representation of the thoughts of the kitchen maid in the foreground, or an actual incident seen through a window. The Virgin of the Immaculate Conception (1618–19) follows a formula used by Pacheco, but replaces the idealized facial type and smoothly finished surfaces of his teacher with the face of a local girl and varied brushwork. His other religious works include The Adoration of the Magi (1619) and Saint John the Evangelist on the Island of Patmos (1618–19), both of which begin to express his more pointed and careful realism.

Also from this period are the portrait of Sor Jerónima de la Fuente (1620)—Velázquez's first full-length portrait—and the genre painting The Waterseller of Seville (1618–1622), which has been termed "the peak of Velázquez's bodegones" and is admired for its virtuoso rendering of volumes and textures as well as for its enigmatic gravitas.

== To Madrid (early period) ==
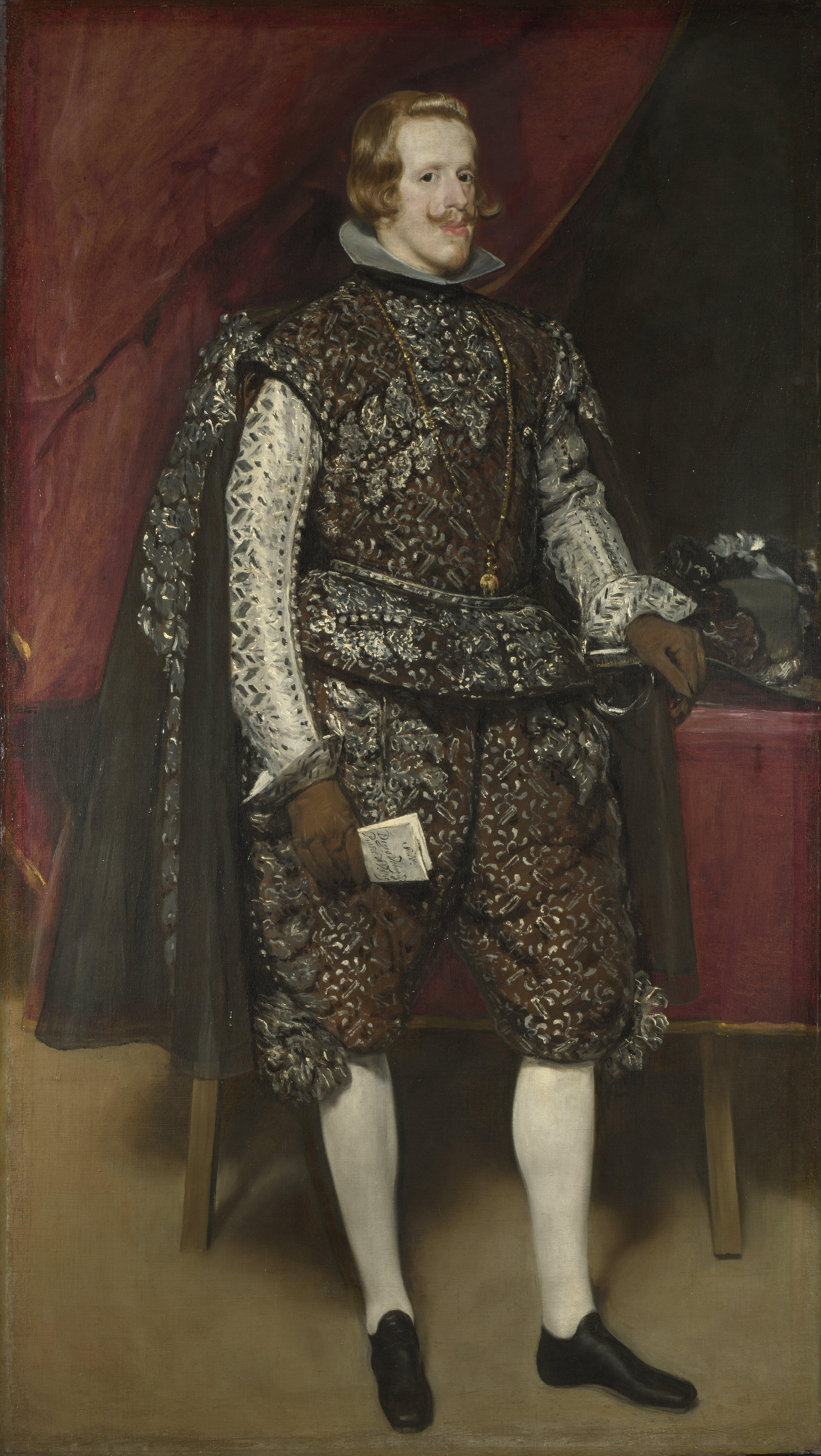
Philip IV in Brown and Silver, 1632, National Gallery London

Velázquez had established his reputation in Seville by the early 1620s. He traveled to Madrid in April 1622, with letters of introduction to Don Juan de Fonseca, chaplain to the King. Velázquez was not allowed to paint the new king, Philip IV, but portrayed the poet Luis de Góngora at the request of Pacheco. The portrait showed Góngora crowned with a laurel wreath, which Velázquez later painted over. He returned to Seville in January 1623 and remained there until August.

In December 1622, Rodrigo de Villandrando, the king's favorite court painter, died. Velázquez received a command to come to the court from Gaspar de Guzmán, Count-Duke of Olivares, the powerful minister of Philip IV. He was offered 50 ducats (175 g of gold) to defray his expenses, and he was accompanied by his father-in-law. Fonseca lodged the young painter in his home and sat for a portrait, which, when completed, was conveyed to the royal palace. A portrait of the king was commissioned, and on 30 August 1623, Philip IV sat for Velázquez. The portrait pleased the king, and Olivares commanded Velázquez to move to Madrid, promising that no other painter would ever paint Philip's portrait and all other portraits of the king would be withdrawn from circulation. In the following year, 1624, he received 300 ducats from the king to pay the cost of moving his family to Madrid, which became his home for the remainder of his life.

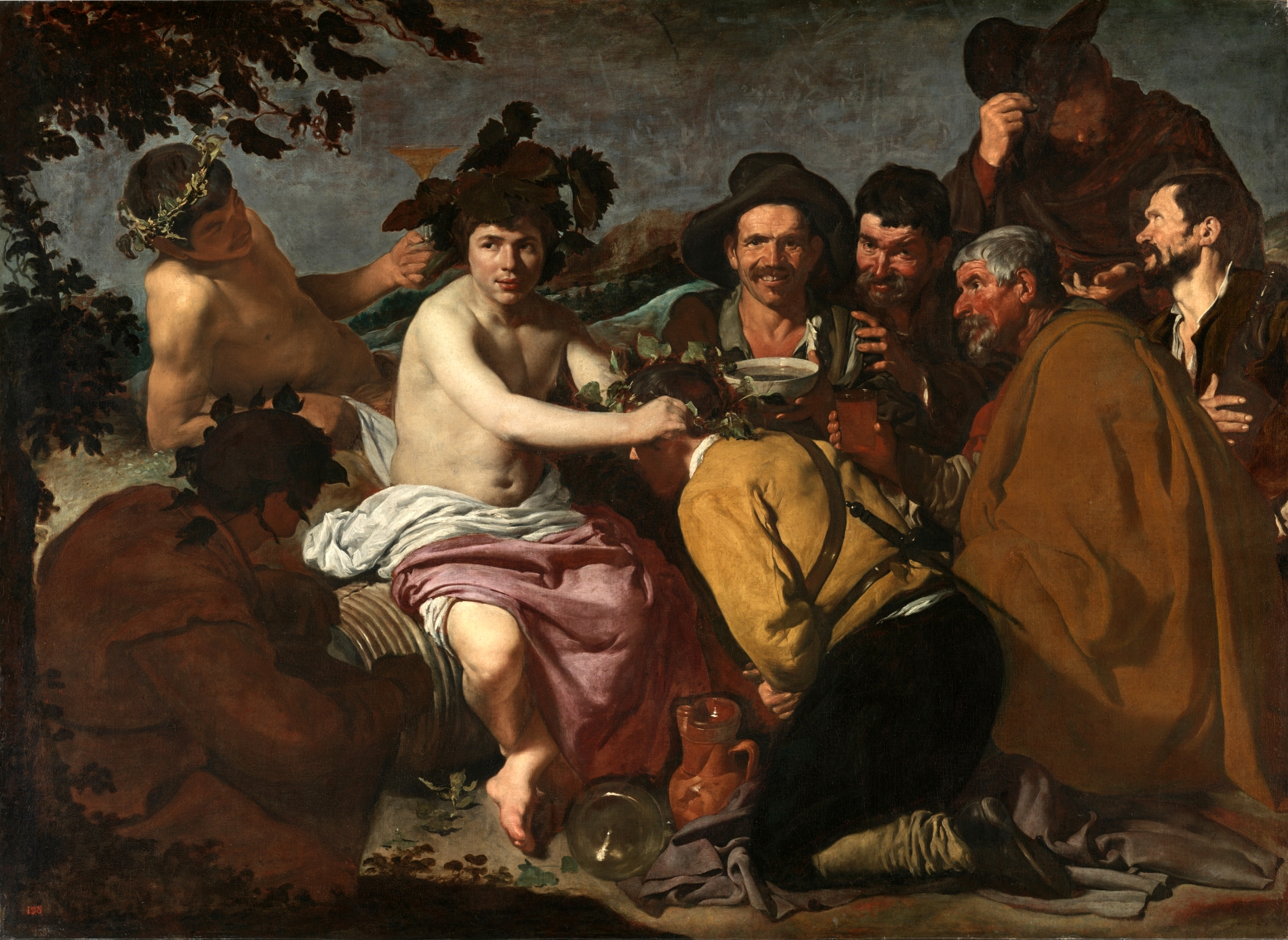
El Triunfo de Baco or Los Borrachos 1629 (English: The Triumph of Bacchus/The Drunks), Museo del Prado, Madrid

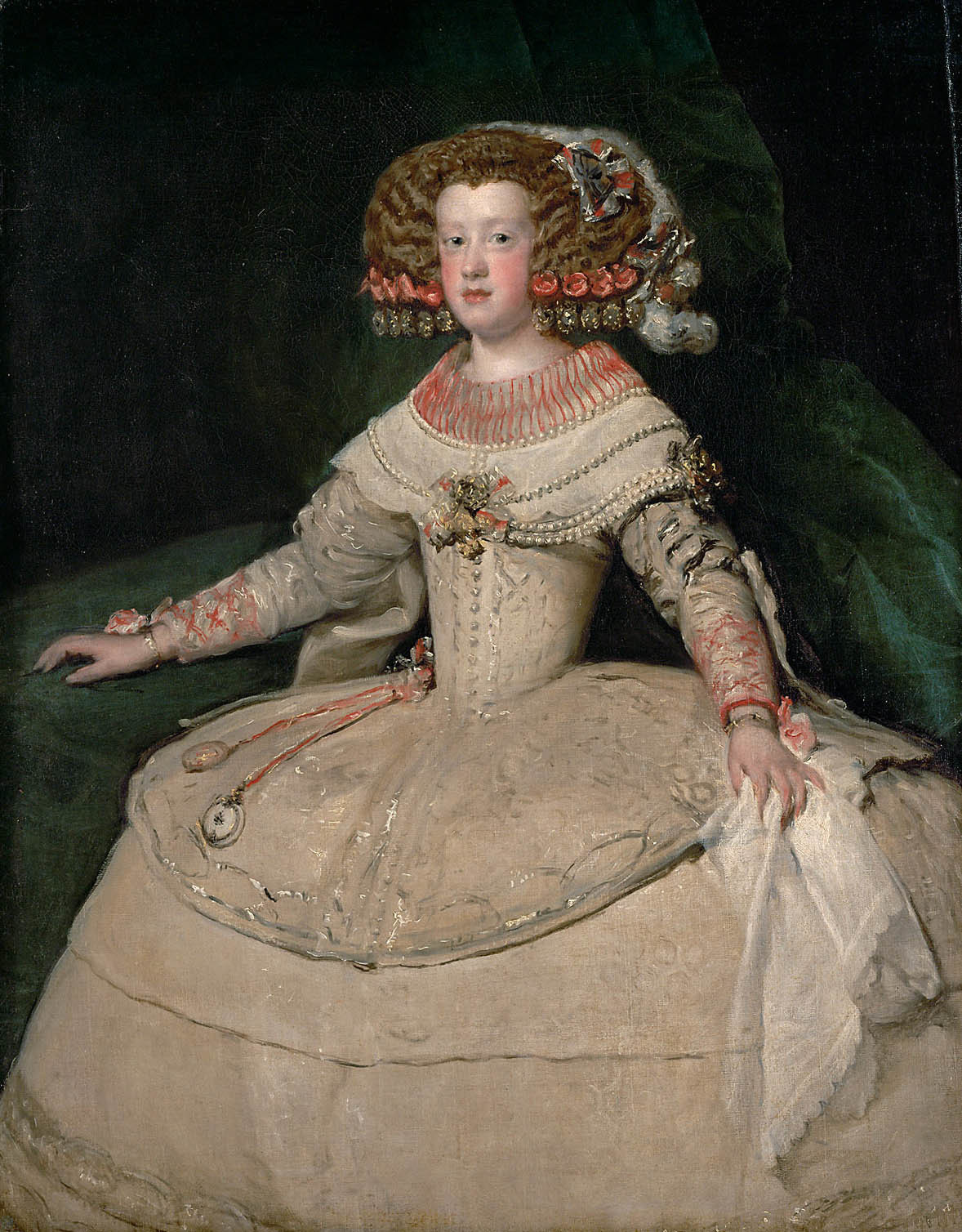
Portrait of the Infanta Maria Theresa, Philip IV's daughter with Elisabeth of France, Kunsthistorisches Museum Vienna

Velázquez secured admission to the royal service with a salary of 20 ducats per month, lodgings and payment for the pictures he might paint. His portrait of Philip was exhibited on the steps of San Felipe and received with enthusiasm. It is now lost (as is the portrait of Fonseca). The Museo del Prado, however, has two of Velázquez's portraits of the king (nos. 1070 and 1071) in which the severity of the Seville period has disappeared and the tones are more delicate. The modeling is firm, recalling that of Antonio Mor, the Dutch portrait painter of Philip II, who exercised a considerable influence on the Spanish school. Velázquez depicts Philip wearing the golilla (es), a stiff linen collar projecting at right angles from the neck. The golilla replaced the earlier court fashion of elaborate ruffed collars as part of Philip's dress reform laws during a period of economic crisis.

The Prince of Wales (afterwards Charles I) arrived at the court of Spain in 1623. Records indicate that he sat for Velázquez, but the picture is now lost.

In 1627, Philip set a competition for the best painters of Spain with the subject to be the expulsion of the Moors. Velázquez won, with a painting (destroyed in a fire at the palace in 1734) which records say depicted Philip III pointing with his baton to a crowd of men and women being led away by soldiers, while the female personification of Spain sits in calm repose. Velázquez was appointed gentleman usher as reward. Later he also received a daily allowance of 12 réis, the same amount allotted to the court barbers, and 90 ducats a year for dress.

In September 1628, Peter Paul Rubens was positioned in Madrid as an emissary from the Infanta Isabella, and Velázquez accompanied him to view the Titians at the Escorial. Rubens, who demonstrated his brilliance as painter and courtier during the seven months of the diplomatic mission, had a high opinion of Velázquez but had no significant influence on his painting. He did, however, galvanize Velázquez's desire to see Italy and the works of the great Italian masters.

In 1629, Velázquez received 100 ducats for the picture of Bacchus (The Triumph of Bacchus), also called Los Borrachos (The Drunks), a painting of a group of men in contemporary dress paying homage to a half-naked ivy-crowned young man seated on a wine barrel. Velázquez's first mythological painting, it has been interpreted variously as a depiction of a theatrical performance, as a parody, or as a symbolic representation of peasants asking the god of wine to give them relief from their sorrows. The style shows the naturalism of Velázquez's early works slightly touched by the influence of Titian and Rubens.

== Italian period ==
In 1629, Velázquez was given permission to spend a year and a half in Italy. Although this first visit is recognized as a crucial chapter in the development of his style—and in the history of Spanish Royal Patronage, since Philip IV sponsored his trip—few details and specifics are known of what the painter saw, whom he met, how he was perceived and what innovations he hoped to introduce into his painting.

He traveled to Venice, Ferrara, Cento, Loreto, Bologna, and Rome. In 1630, he visited Naples to paint the portrait of Maria Anna of Spain, and there he probably met Ribera. The major works from his first Italian period are Joseph's Bloody Coat brought to Jacob (1629–30) and Apollo in the Forge of Vulcan (1630), both of which reveal his ambition to rival the Italians as a history painter in the grand manner. The two compositions of several nearly life-sized figures have similar dimensions, and may have been conceived as pendants—the biblical scene depicting a deception, and the mythological scene depicting the revelation of a deception. As he had done in The Triumph of Bacchus, Velázquez presented his characters as contemporary people whose gestures and facial expressions were those of everyday life. Following the example of Bolognese painters such as Guido Reni, Velázquez painted Apollo in the Forge of Vulcan on canvas prepared with a light gray ground rather than the dark reddish ground of all his earlier works. The change resulted in a greater luminosity than he had previously achieved, and he made the use of light-gray grounds his regular practice.

=== Return to Madrid (middle period) ===
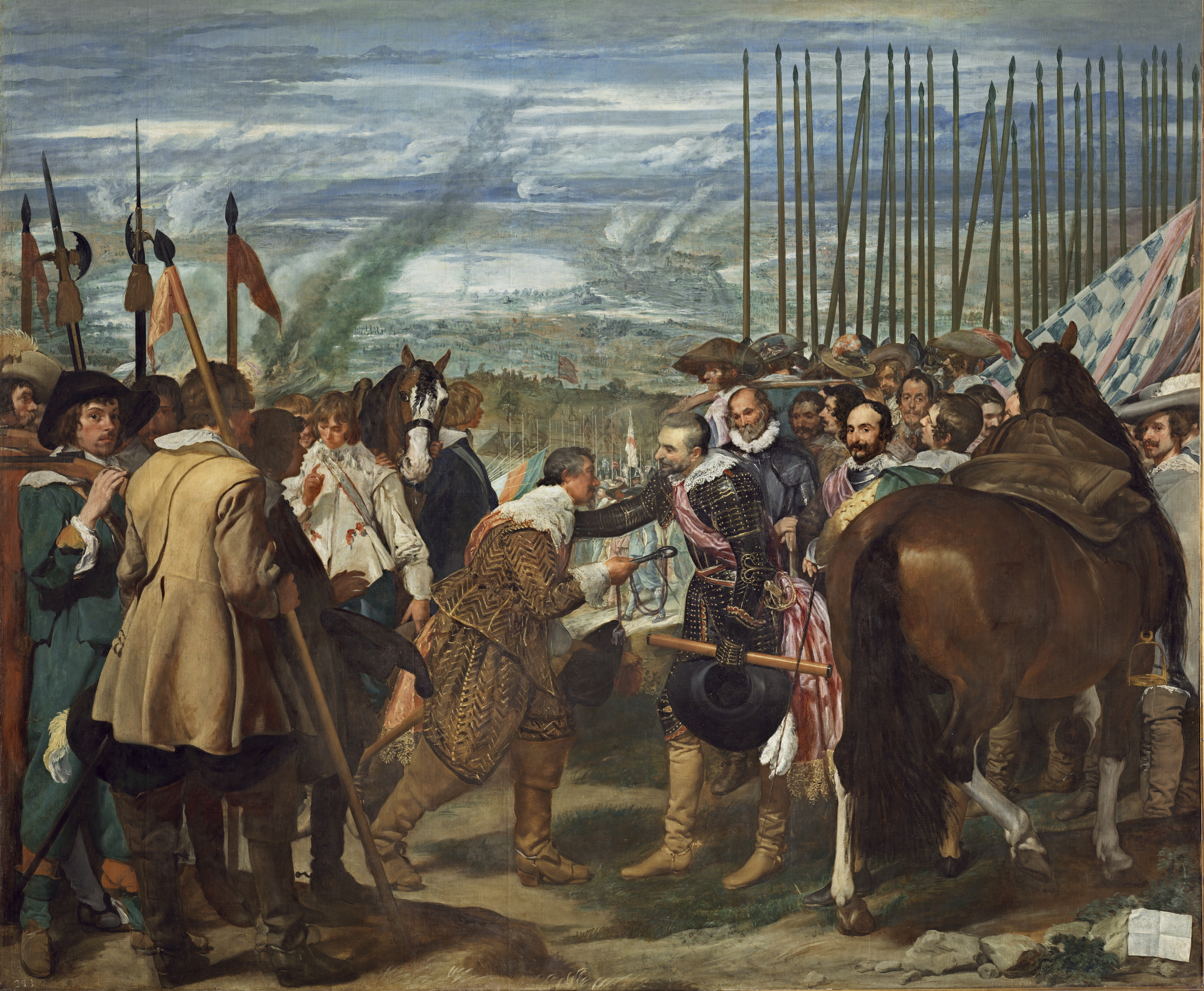
La rendición de Breda (1634–35) was inspired by Velázquez's first visit to Italy, in which he accompanied Ambrogio Spinola, who conquered the Dutch city of Breda a few years prior. It depicts a transfer of the key to the city from the Dutch to the Spanish army during the Siege of Breda. It is considered one of the best of Velázquez's paintings.

Velázquez returned to Madrid in January 1631. That year he completed the first of his many portraits of the young prince, beginning with Prince Balthasar Charles with a Dwarf (Boston, Museum of Fine Arts). ln portraits such as Equestrian portrait of prince Balthasar Charles (1635), Velázquez depicts the prince looking dignified and lordly, or in the dress of a field marshal on his prancing steed. In one version, the scene is in the riding school of the palace, the king and queen looking on from a balcony, while Olivares attends as master of the horse to the prince.

To decorate the king's new palace, the Palacio del Buen Retiro, Velázquez painted equestrian portraits of the royal family. In Philip IV on Horseback (1634–35), the king is represented in profile in an image of imperturbable majesty, demonstrating expert horsemanship by executing an effortless levade. The large The Surrender of Breda (1634–35), also painted for the Palacio, is Velázquez's only extant painting depicting contemporary history. Its symbolic treatment of a Spanish military victory over the Dutch eschews the rhetoric of conquest and superiority that is typical in such scenes, in which a general on horseback looks down on his vanquished, kneeling opponent. Instead, Velázquez shows the Spanish general standing before his Dutch counterpart as an equal, and extending to him a hand of consolation.

The impassive, saturnine face of the influential minister Olivares is familiar to us from the many portraits painted by Velázquez. Two are notable: one is full-length, stately and dignified, in which he wears the green cross of the order of Alcantara and holds a wand, the badge of his office as master of the horse; in the other, The Count-Duke of Olivares on Horseback (c. 1635), he is flatteringly represented as a field marshal during action. In these portraits, Velázquez well repaid the debt of gratitude that he owed to the patron who had first brought him to the king's attention.

The sculptor Juan Martínez Montañés modeled a statue on one of Velázquez's equestrian portraits of the king (painted in 1636; now lost) which was cast in bronze by the Florentine sculptor Pietro Tacca and now stands in the Plaza de Oriente in Madrid. Velázquez was in close attendance to Philip, and accompanied him to Aragon in 1644, where the artist painted a portrait of the monarch in the costume as he reviewed his troops in Fraga.

Velázquez's paintings of Aesop and Menippus (both c. 1636–1638) portray ancient writers in the guise of portraits of beggars. Mars Resting (c. 1638) is both a depiction of a mythological figure and a portrait of a weary-looking, middle-aged man posing as Mars. The model is painted with attention to his individuality, while his unkempt, oversized mustache is a faintly comic incongruity. The equivocal image has been interpreted in various ways: Javier Portús describes it as a "reflection on reality, representation, and the artistic vision", while Alfonso E. Pérez Sánchez says it "has also been seen as a melancholy meditation on the arms of Spain in decline".

Had it not been for his royal appointment, which enabled Velázquez to escape the censorship of the Inquisition, he would not have been able to release his La Venus del espejo (c. 1644–1648, English: Venus at her Mirror) also known as The Rokeby Venus. It is the first known female nude painted by a Spanish artist, and the only surviving female nude by Velázquez.

==== Portraiture ====
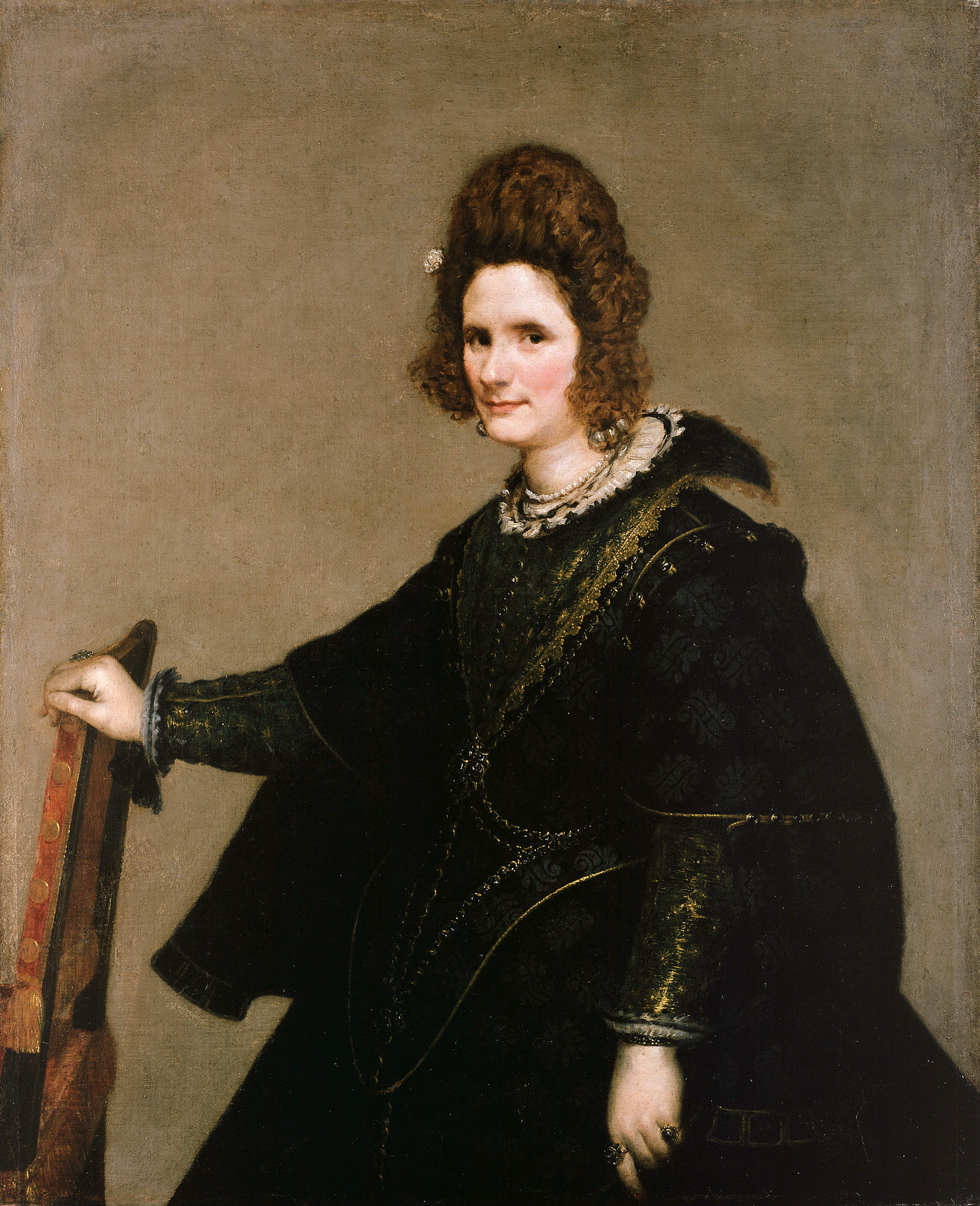
Lady from court, c. 1635, Gemäldegalerie Berlin

Besides the many portraits of Philip by Velázquez—thirty-four by one count—he painted portraits of other members of the royal family: Philip's first wife, Elisabeth of Bourbon, and her children, especially her eldest son, Don Baltasar Carlos, whom Velázquez first depicted at about two years of age. Cavaliers, soldiers, churchmen, and the poet Francisco de Quevedo (now at Apsley House), sat for Velázquez.

Velázquez also painted several buffoons and dwarfs in Philip's court, whom he depicted sympathetically and with respect for their individuality, as in The Jester Don Diego de Acedo (1644), whose intelligent face and huge folio with ink-bottle and pen by his side show him to be a wise and well-educated man. Pablo de Valladolid (1635), a buffoon evidently acting a part, and The Buffoon of Coria (1639) belong to this middle period.

As court painter, Velázquez had fewer commissions for religious works than any of his contemporaries. Christ Crucified (1632), painted for the Convent of San Plácido in Madrid, depicts Christ immediately after death. The Savior's head hangs on his breast and a mass of dark tangled hair conceals part of the face, visually reinforcing the idea of death. The figure is presented alone before a dark background.

Velázquez's son-in-law Juan Bautista Martínez del Mazo had succeeded him as usher in 1634, and Mazo himself had received a steady promotion in the royal household. Mazo received a pension of 500 ducats in 1640, increased to 700 in 1648, for portraits painted and to be painted, and was appointed inspector of works in the palace in 1647.

Philip now entrusted Velázquez with the mission of procuring paintings and sculpture for the royal collection. Rich in pictures, Spain was weak in statuary, and Velázquez was commissioned once again to proceed to Italy to make purchases.

=== Second visit to Italy ===
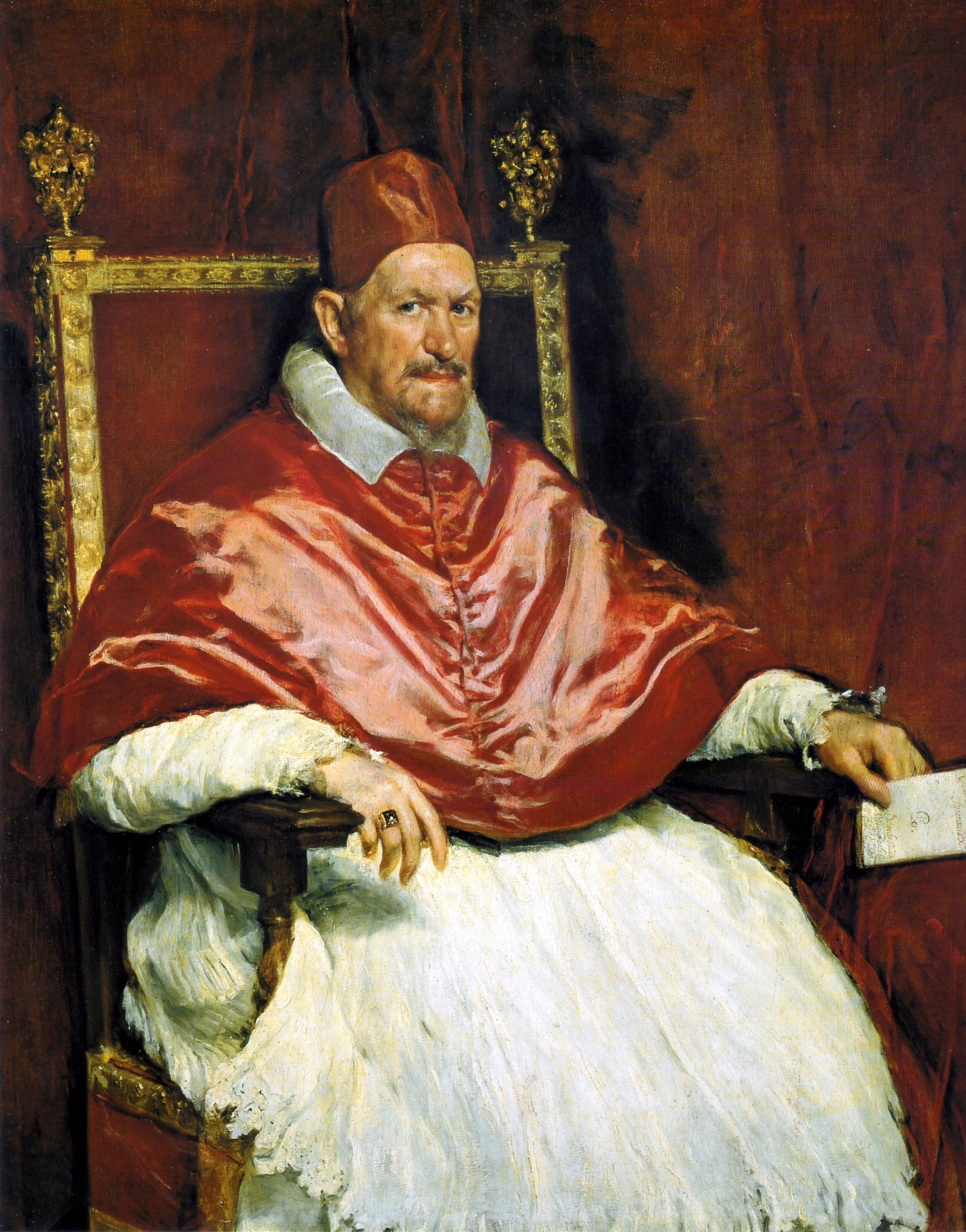
Portrait of Pope Innocent X, 1650

When he set out in 1649, he was accompanied by his assistant Juan de Pareja who at this point in time was a slave and who had been trained in painting by Velázquez. Velázquez sailed from Málaga, landed at Genoa, and proceeded from Milan to Venice, buying paintings of Titian, Tintoretto and Veronese as he went. At Modena he was received with much favor by the duke, and here he painted the portrait of the duke at the Modena gallery and two portraits that now adorn the Dresden gallery, for these paintings came from the Modena sale of 1746.

Those works presage the advent of the painter's third and latest manner, a noble example of which is the great portrait of Pope Innocent X in the Doria Pamphilj Gallery in Rome, where Velázquez now proceeded. There he was received with marked favor by the Pope, who presented him with a medal and golden chain. Velázquez took a copy of the portrait (which Sir Joshua Reynolds thought was the finest picture in Rome) with him to Spain. Several copies of it exist in different galleries, some of them possibly studies for the original or replicas painted for Philip. Velázquez, in this work, had now reached the manera abreviada, a term coined by contemporary Spaniards for this bolder, sharper style. The portrait shows such ruthlessness in Innocent's expression that some in the Vatican feared that it would be seen unfavorably by the Pope; in fact Innocent was pleased with the work, and hung it in his official visitor's waiting room.

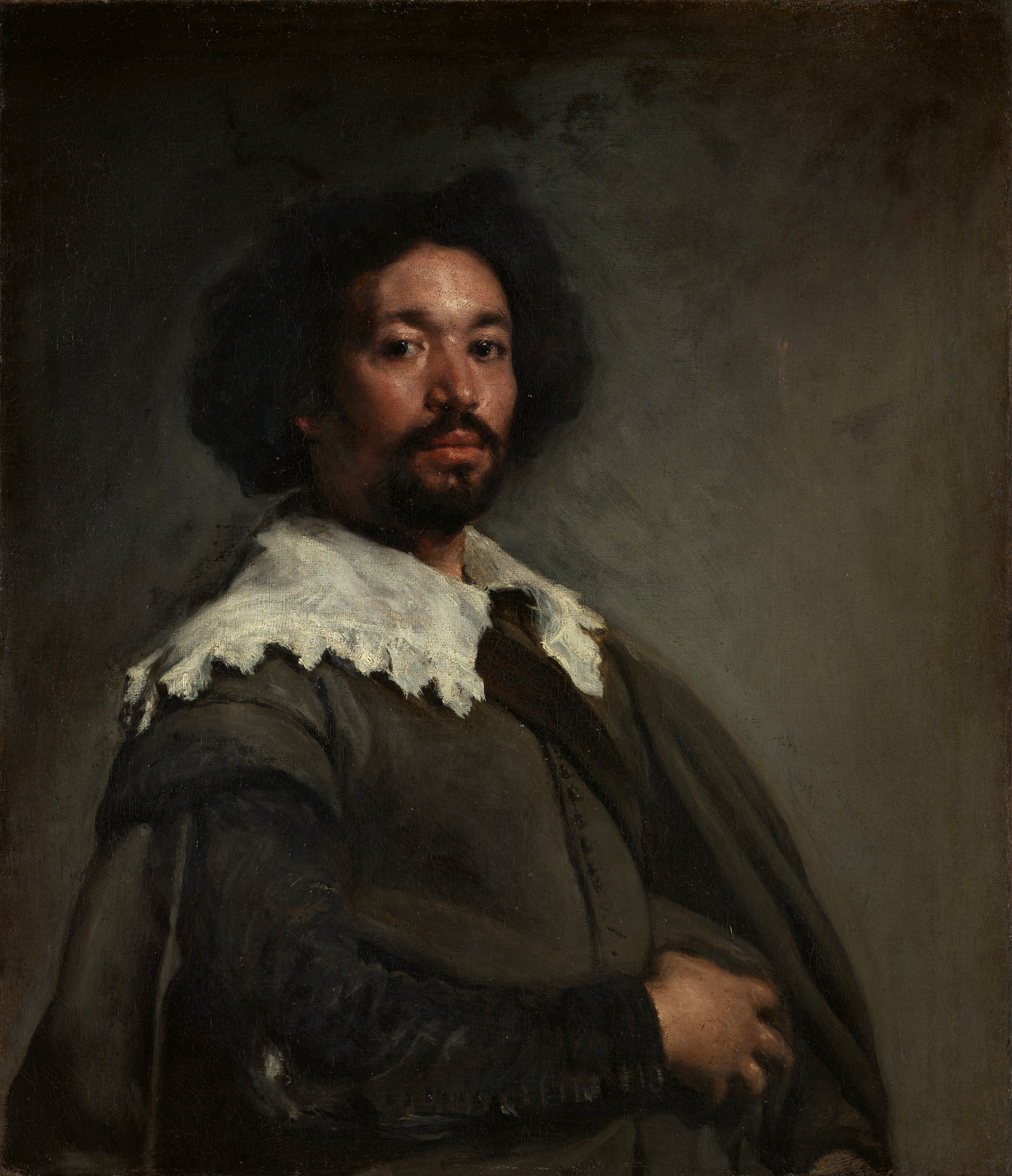
Portrait of Juan de Pareja (c. 1650)

In 1650 in Rome Velázquez also painted a portrait of Juan de Pareja, now in the Metropolitan Museum of Art in New York City. This portrait procured his election into the Accademia di San Luca. Purportedly Velázquez created this portrait as a warm-up of his skills before his portrait of the Pope. It captures in great detail Pareja's countenance and his somewhat worn and patched clothing with an economic use of brushwork. In November 1650, Juan de Pareja was freed from slavery by Velázquez.

To this period also belong two small landscape paintings both titled View of the Garden of the Villa Medici. As landscapes apparently painted directly from nature, they were exceptional for their time, and reveal Velázquez's close study of light at different times of day.

As part of his mission to procure decorations for the Room of Mirrors at the Royal Alcazar of Madrid, Velázquez commissioned Matteo Bonuccelli to cast twelve bronze copies of the Medici lions. The copies are now in the Royal Palace of Madrid and the Museo del Prado. Also in the Royal Palace are a set of sculptures from the series The Seven Planets which Velázquez had originally brought from Italy for the Alcazar.

During his time in Rome, Velázquez fathered a natural son, Antonio, whom he is not known ever to have seen.

== Return to Spain and later career ==
From February 1650, Philip repeatedly sought Velázquez's return to Spain. Accordingly, after visiting Naples—where he saw his old friend Jose Ribera—and Venice, Velázquez returned to Spain via Barcelona in 1651, taking with him many pictures and 300 pieces of statuary, which afterwards were arranged and catalogued for the king.

Elisabeth of France had died in 1644, and the king had married Mariana of Austria, whom Velázquez now painted in many attitudes. In 1652 he was specially chosen by the king to fill the high office of aposentador mayor, which imposed on him the duty of looking after the quarters occupied by the court—a responsible function which was no sinecure and one which interfered with the exercise of his art. Yet far from indicating any decline, his works of this period are amongst the highest examples of his style.

=== Las Meninas ===
Las Meninas (1656)

One of the infantas, Margaret Theresa, the eldest daughter of the new queen, appears to be the subject of Las Meninas (1656, English: The Maids of Honour), Velázquez's magnum opus. Created four years before his death, it serves as an outstanding example of European baroque art. Luca Giordano, a contemporary Italian painter, referred to it as the "theology of painting", and in 1827 the president of the Royal Academy of Arts Sir Thomas Lawrence described it in a letter as "the true philosophy of the art". However, it is unclear as to who or what is the true subject of the picture. Is it the royal daughter, or perhaps the painter himself? The king and queen are seen reflected in a mirror on the back wall, but the source of the reflection is a mystery: are the royal pair standing in the viewer's space, or does the mirror reflect the painting on which Velázquez is working? Dale Brown says Velázquez may have conceived the faded image of the king and queen on the back wall as a foreshadowing of the fall of the Spanish Empire that was to gain momentum following Philip's death.

In the 1966 book Les Mots et Les Choses (The Order of Things), philosopher Michel Foucault devotes the opening chapter to a detailed analysis of Las Meninas. He describes the ways in which the painting problematizes issues of representation through its use of mirrors, screens, and the subsequent oscillations that occur between the image's interior, surface, and exterior.

It is said the king painted the honorary Cross of Saint James of the Order of Santiago on the breast of the painter as it appears today on the canvas. However, Velázquez did not receive this honor of knighthood until three years after execution of this painting. Even the King of Spain could not make his favorite court painter a belted knight without the consent of the commission established to inquire into the purity of his lineage. The aim of these inquiries would be to prevent the appointment to positions of anyone found to have even a taint of heresy in their lineage—that is, a trace of Jewish or Moorish blood or contamination by trade or commerce in either side of the family for many generations. The records of this commission have been found among the archives of the Order of Santiago. Velázquez was awarded the honor in 1659. His occupation as plebeian and tradesman was justified because, as painter to the king, he was evidently not involved in the practice of "selling" pictures.

=== Final years ===
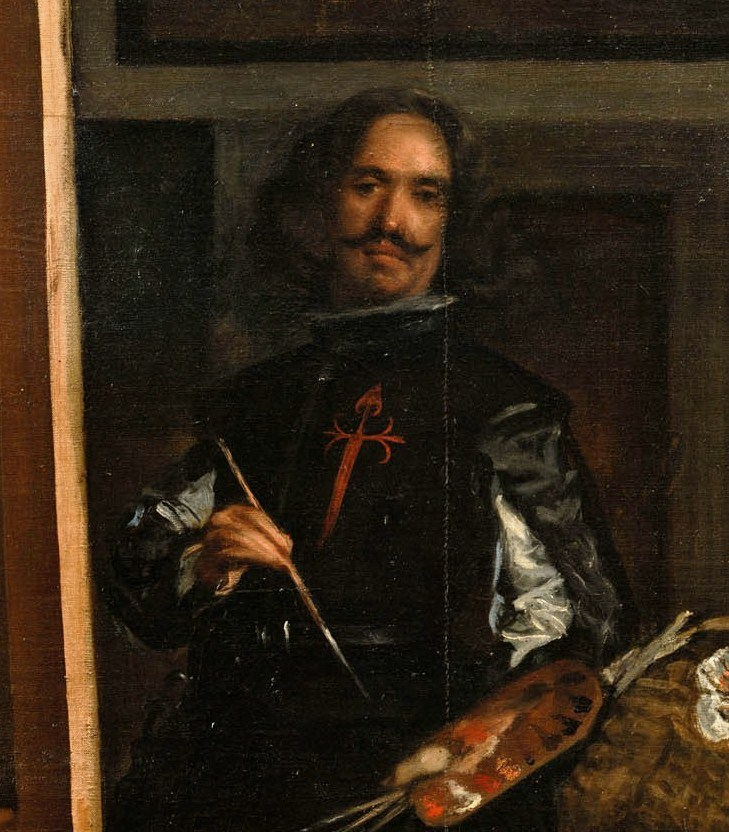
Detail of Las Meninas (Velázquez's self-portrait)

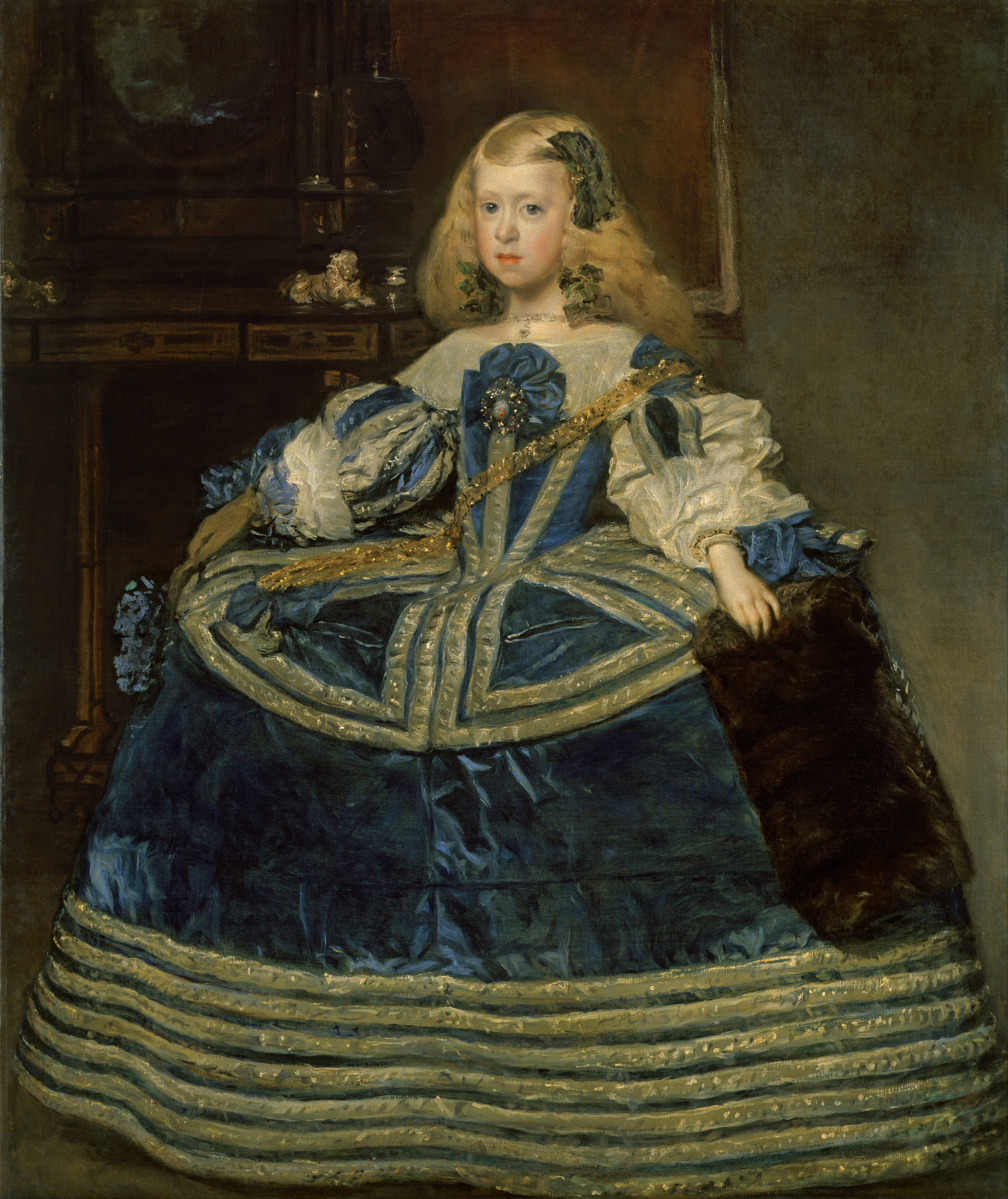
Portrait of the eight-year-old Infanta Margarita Teresa in a Blue Dress (1659)

There were essentially only two patrons of art in Spain—the church and the art-loving king and court. Bartolomé Esteban Murillo, who toiled for a rich and powerful church, left little means to pay for his burial, while Velázquez lived and died in the enjoyment of a good salary and pension.

One of his final works was Las hilanderas (The Spinners), painted circa 1657, a depiction of Ovid's Fable of Arachne. The tapestry in the background is based on Titian's The Rape of Europa, or, more probably, the copy that Rubens painted in Madrid. It is full of light, air and movement, featuring vibrant colors and careful handling. Anton Raphael Mengs said this work seemed to have been painted not by the hand but by the pure force of will. It displays a concentration of all the art-knowledge Velázquez had gathered during his long artistic career of more than forty years. The scheme is simple—a confluence of varied and blended red, bluish-green, gray and black.

Velázquez's last portraits of the royal children are regarded as among his finest works. In Infanta Margarita Teresa in a Blue Dress, his personal style reached its fullest development: dabs of color across broad areas of the canvas produce an almost impressionistic effect, and the viewer must stand at a suitable distance to perceive the space as fully three-dimensional.

His only surviving portrait of Prince Felipe Próspero is remarkable for its combination of the features of the child prince and his dog with a subtle sense of gloom. The hope that was placed at that time in the sole heir to the Spanish crown is reflected in the depiction: fresh red and white stand in contrast to late autumnal, morbid colors. A small dog with wide eyes looks at the viewer as if questioningly, and the largely pale background hints at a gloomy fate: the little prince was barely four years old when he died. As in all of the artist's late paintings, the handling of the colors is extraordinarily fluid and vibrant.

In 1660, a peace treaty between France and Spain was consummated by the marriage of Maria Theresa with Louis XIV, and the ceremony took place on the Island of Pheasants, a small swampy island in the Bidassoa. Velázquez was charged with the decoration of the Spanish pavilion and with the entire scenic display. He attracted much attention from the nobility of his bearing and the splendor of his costume. On 26 June he returned to Madrid, and on 31 July he was stricken with fever. Feeling his end approaching, he signed his will, appointing as his sole executors his wife and his firm friend named Fuensalida, keeper of the royal records. He died on 6 August 1660. He was buried in the Fuensalida vault of the church of San Juan Bautista, and within eight days his wife Juana was buried beside him. This church was destroyed by the French around 1809, so his place of interment is now unknown.

There was much difficulty in adjusting the tangled accounts outstanding between Velázquez and the treasury, and it was not until 1666, after the death of King Philip, that they were finally settled.

== Style and technique ==
=== Caravaggio and Velázquez ===
By the early 17th century, most European artists had been influenced by Caravaggesque naturalism. In his Arte de la Pintura (The Art of Painting), Pacheco praised Caravaggio as a painter who was able to depict "a lifelike reality by painting from nature not only the human face, [...] but also clothing, whether of wool or silk, and everything else."

Velázquez incorporated Caravaggio's use of realism, chiaroscuro and vivid colors, but he used this only as a starting point. José Lopez-Rey, Spanish art historian and a renowned Velázquez scholar, describes how Velázquez's style went beyond Caravaggio, even since his early works:

Caravaggio's vivid chiaroscuro was fundamental to his followers. He achieved it by [...] accentuating their shapes and colours with an unvaried sheen. Neither the quality of the brushwork, the texture of the pigment, nor the intensity of the light varies significantly within any one of Caravaggio's works. [...] Velázquez achieved a sensuous depiction that was alien to Caravaggio's naturalism, as was his achievement of an atmospheric rendering of spatial depth and a distinct expression of the polarity of the divine and the human. In achieving this, Velázquez revealed a commanding feeling for both the texture of the subject and the texture of the pigment itself. This led him to a fluid handling of light and shade and the use of a variety of brushstrokes, rough or smooth, filmy or thick, which were more akin to Titian's than to Caravaggio's.

=== Visits to Italy ===
It is canonical to divide Velázquez's career by his two visits to Italy. He rarely signed his pictures, and the royal archives give the dates of only his most important works. Internal evidence and history pertaining to his portraits supply the rest to a certain extent.

Although acquainted with all the Italian schools and a friend of the foremost painters of his day, Velázquez was strong enough to withstand external influences and work out for himself the development of his own nature and his own principles of art. He rejected the pomp that characterized the portraiture of other European courts, and instead brought an even greater reserve to the understated formula for Habsburg portraiture established by Titian, Antonio Mor, and Alonso Sánchez Coello. He is known for using a rather limited palette, but he mixed the available opaints with great skill to achieve varying hues. His pigments were not significantly different from those of his contemporaries and he mainly employed azurite, smalt, vermilion, red lake, lead-tin-yellow and ochres. His early works were painted on canvases prepared with a red-brown ground. He adopted the use of light-gray grounds during his first trip to Italy, and continued using them for the rest of his life. The change resulted in paintings with greater luminosity and a generally cool, silvery range of color.

Few drawings are securely attributed to Velázquez. Although preparatory drawings for some of his paintings exist, his method was to paint directly from life, and x-rays of his paintings reveal that he frequently made changes in his composition as a painting progressed.

== Legacy ==
Velázquez was not prolific; he is estimated to have produced between 110 and 120 known canvases. He produced no etchings or engravings, and only a few drawings are attributed to him.

Velázquez is the most influential figure in the history of Spanish portraiture. Although he had few immediate followers, Spanish court painters such as his son-in-law Juan Bautista Martinez del Mazo and Juan Carreño de Miranda took inspiration from his work. Mazo closely mimicked his style and many paintings and copies by Mazo were formerly attributed to Velázquez. Velázquez's reputation languished in the eighteenth century, when Spanish court portraiture was dominated by artists of foreign birth and training. Towards the end of the century, his importance was increasingly recognized by intellectuals close to the Spanish court—an essay published In 1781 by Gaspar Melchor de Jovellanos said of Velázquez that "when he died, the glory of Painting in Spain died with him." In 1778, Goya made a set of etchings after paintings by Velázquez, as part of a project by the Count of Floridablanca to produce prints of paintings in the Royal Collection. Goya's free copies reveal a searching engagement with the older master's work, which remained a model for Goya for the rest of his career.

Velázquez's work was little known outside of Spain until the nineteenth century. His paintings mostly escaped being stolen by the French marshals during the Peninsular War. In 1828, Sir David Wilkie wrote from Madrid that he felt himself in the presence of a new power in art as he looked at the works of Velázquez, and at the same time found a wonderful affinity between this artist and the British school of portrait painters, especially Henry Raeburn. He was struck by the "sparkle and vivacity" pervading Velázquez's works.

Velázquez is often cited as a key influence on the art of Édouard Manet, who is often considered the bridge between realism and impressionism. Calling Velázquez the "painter of painters", Manet admired the immediacy and vivid brushwork of Velázquez's work and built upon Velázquez's motifs in his own art. He was impressed in particular by the background in the Portrait of Pablo de Valladolid, which he described as "possibly the most surprising fragment of painting that has ever been made." The impressionists considered Velasquez as a precursor to a pure vision and considered him the pioneer of modern art.

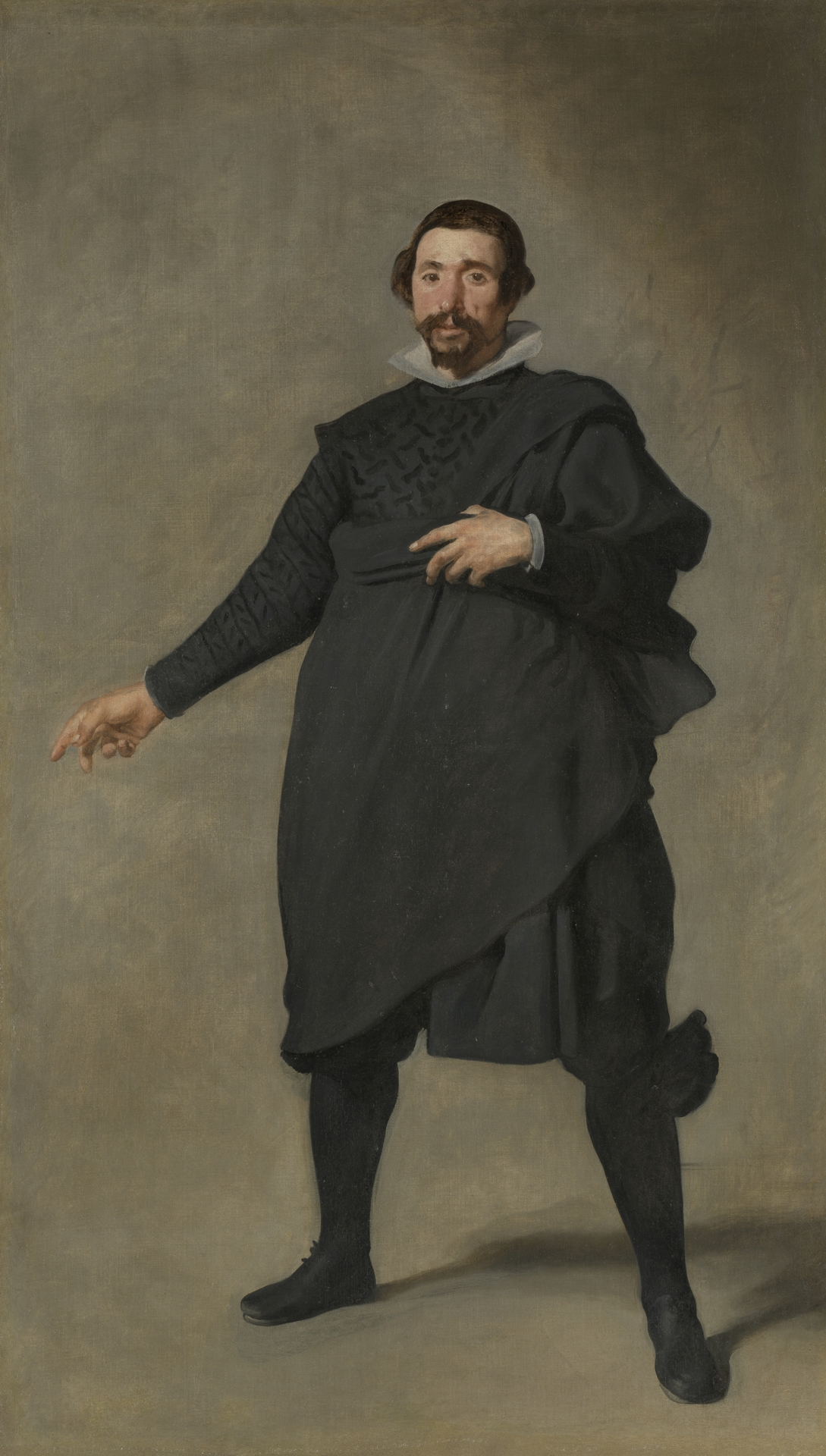
Portrait of Pablo de Valladolid, 1635, a court fool of Philip IV

In the late nineteenth century, artists such as James McNeill Whistler and John Singer Sargent were strongly influenced by Velázquez.

=== Modern recreations of classics ===
The respect with which twentieth century painters regard Velázquez's work attests to its continuing importance. Pablo Picasso paid homage to Velázquez in 1957 when he recreated Las Meninas in 44 variations, in his characteristic style. Although Picasso was concerned that his reinterpretations of Velázquez's painting would be seen merely as copies rather than as unique representations, the enormous works—the largest he had produced since Guernica (1937)—entered the canon of Spanish art.

Salvador Dalí, as with Picasso, in anticipation of the tercentennial of Velázquez's death, created in 1958 a work entitled Velázquez Painting the Infanta Margarita With the Lights and Shadows of His Own Glory. The color scheme shows Dalí's serious tribute to Velázquez; the work also functioned, as in Picasso's case, as a vehicle for the presentation of newer theories in art and thought—nuclear mysticism, in Dalí's case.

The Anglo-Irish painter Francis Bacon found Velázquez's Portrait of Innocent X to be "one of the greatest portraits ever". He created several expressionist variations of this piece in the 1950s; however, Bacon's paintings sometimes presented a more gruesome image of Innocent. One such famous variation, entitled Figure with Meat (1954), shows the pope between two halves of a bisected cow.

Some South American artists also paid tribute to him such as Fernando Botero with his portraits of oversized characters extracted from some of Vélasquez paintings and Herman Braun-Vega with his series Velasquez stripped bare accompanied by the Menines from which the main polyptych is exhibited at the Museum of Antioquia in Medellín, Colombia and the quadriptych Velasquez going to his easel is at the Blanton Museum of Art in Austin, Texas.

=== Recent rediscoveries of Velázquez originals ===
In 2009, the Portrait of a Man in the collection of the Metropolitan Museum of Art, which had long been associated with the followers of Velázquez' style of painting, was cleaned and restored. It was found to be by Velázquez himself, and the features of the man match those of a figure in the painting "the Surrender of Breda". The newly cleaned canvas may therefore be a study for that painting. Although the attribution to Velázquez is regarded as certain, the identity of the sitter is still open to question. Some art historians consider this new study to be a self-portrait by Velázquez.

In 2010, it was reported that a damaged painting long relegated to a basement of the Yale University Art Gallery might be an early work by Velázquez. Thought to have been given to Yale in 1925, the painting has previously been attributed to the 17th century Spanish school. Some scholars are prepared to attribute the painting to Velázquez, although the Prado Museum in Madrid is reserving judgment. The work, which depicts the Virgin Mary being taught to read, will be restored by conservators at Yale.

In October 2011, it was confirmed by art historian Dr. Peter Cherry of Trinity College Dublin through X-ray analysis that a portrait found in the UK in the former collection of the 19th century painter Matthew Shepperson is a previously unknown work by Velázquez. The portrait is of an unidentified man in his fifties or sixties, who could possibly be Juan Mateos, the Master of the Hunt for Velázquez's patron, King Philip IV of Spain. The painting measures 47 x 39 cm and was sold at auction on 7 December 2011, for £3,000,000.

=== Descendants ===
Velázquez, through his daughter Francisca de Silva Velázquez y Pacheco (1619–1658), is an ancestor of the Marquesses of Monteleone, including Enriquetta (Henrietta) Casado de Monteleone (1725–1761) who in 1746 married Heinrich VI, Count Reuss zu Köstritz (1707–1783). Through them are descended a number of European royalty, among them King Felipe VI of Spain through his mother Sophia of Greece and Denmark, King Willem-Alexander of the Netherlands, King Carl XVI Gustaf of Sweden, King Albert II of Belgium, Hans-Adam II, Prince of Liechtenstein, and Henri, Grand Duke of Luxembourg.

== In popular culture ==
Velázquez has been portrayed by Julián Villagrán in a Spanish fantasy television series, El ministerio del tiempo, and is a recurring character in the series.

== See also ==
- List of works by Diego Velázquez

== Sources ==
- Asturias, Miguel Ángel, and P. M. Bardi (1969). L'opera completa di Velázquez. Milano: Rizzoli. OCLC 991877516.
- Carr, Dawson W., Xavier Bray, and Diego Velázquez (2006). Velázquez. London: National Gallery. ISBN 1857093038.
- Harris, Enriqueta (1982). Velázquez. Ithaca, N.Y.: Cornell University Press. ISBN 0801415268.
- McKim-Smith, G., Andersen-Bergdoll, G., Newman, R. (1988). Examining Velázquez. Yale University Press. ISBN 0300036159.
- Ortega y Gasset, José (1953). Velázquez. New York: Random House. OCLC 989292513.
- Ortiz, Antonio Domínguez et al. (1990). Velázquez. Madrid: Museo del Prado. ISBN 978-8-48731-701-9.
- Portús, Javier (2004). The Spanish Portrait from El Greco to Picasso (exposition, Museo nacional del Prado, 20 October 2004 – 6 February 2005). London: Scala. ISBN 185759374X.
