= Convent of San Plácido (Madrid) =

- Convento de San Plácido (Spanish)
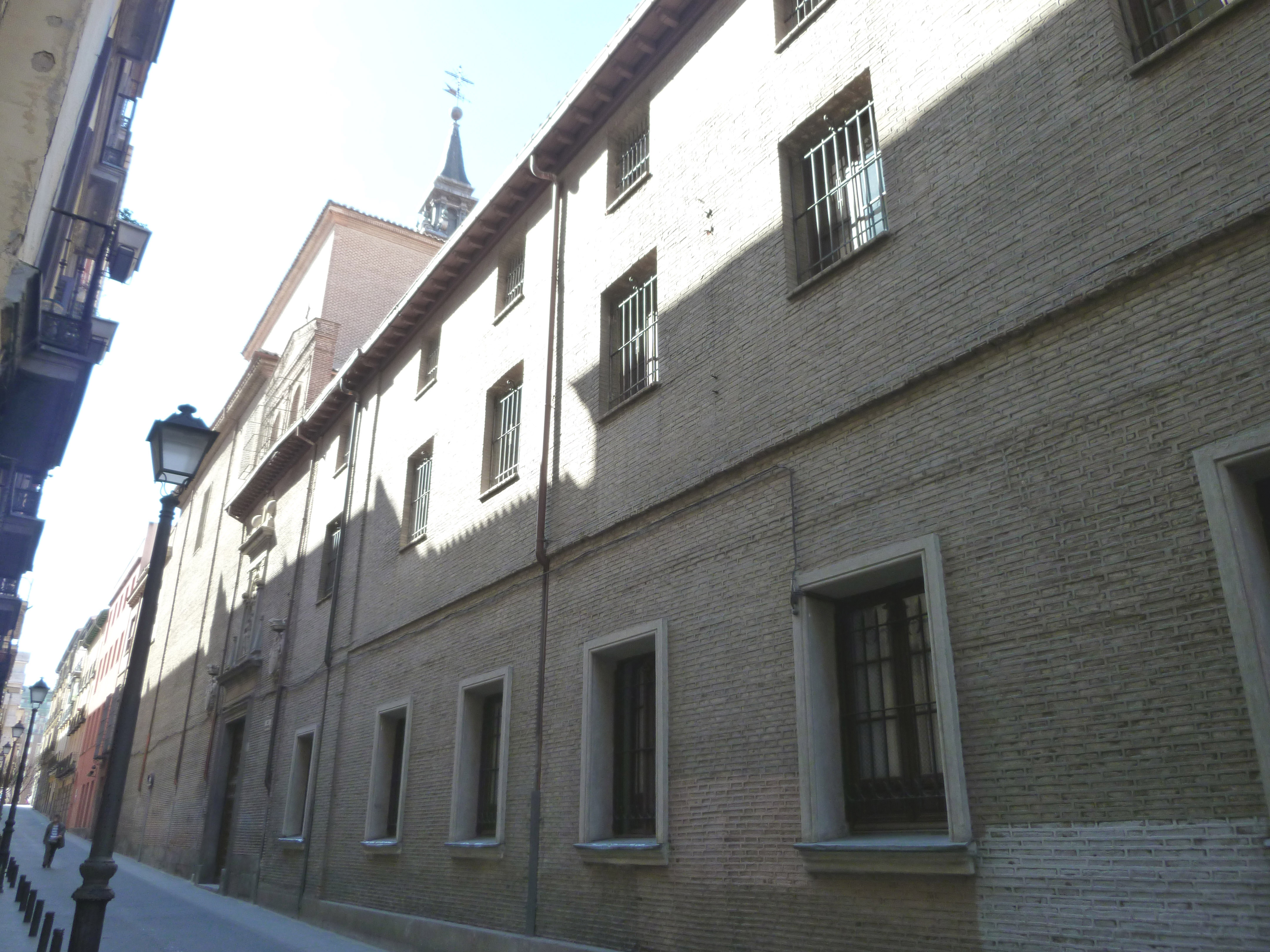

- Location within Spain
- 40.422653°N 3.704834°W
- Location: Madrid, Spain

Spanish Cultural Heritage
- Official name: Convento de San Plácido
- Type: Non-movable
- Criteria: Monument
- Designated: 1943
- Reference no.: RI-51-0001133

The Convent of San Plácido (Spanish: Convento de San Plácido) is a convent located in Madrid, Spain. It was declared Bien de Interés Cultural in 1943.

The interior of the church was decorated including frescoes in the ceiling of the main chapel by Francisco Rizi and Juan Martín Cabezalero. In the retable of the main altar is an Annunciation by Claudio Coello. The church features sculptures by Manuel Pereira and Gregorio Fernández (Dead Christ).
