= Apollo in the Forge of Vulcan =

Painting by Diego de Velázquez

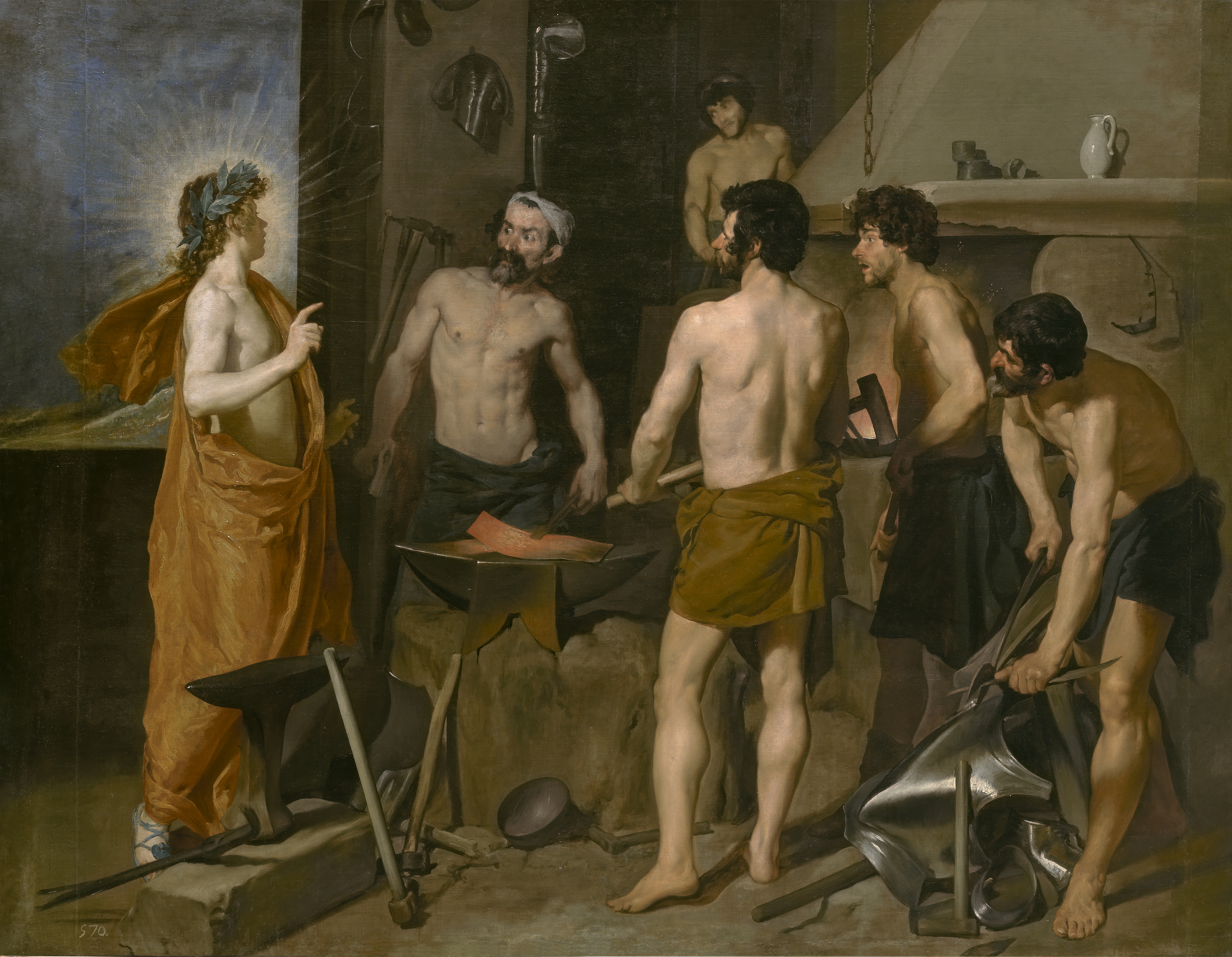
- Artist: Diego Velázquez
- Year: 1630
- Medium: Oil on canvas
- Movement: Baroque
- Dimensions: 223 cm × 290 cm (87 3/4 in × 114 1/8 in)
- Location: Museo del Prado, Madrid, Spain

Apollo in the Forge of Vulcan (Spanish: Apolo en la Fragua de Vulcano), sometimes referred to as Vulcan's Forge, is an oil painting by Diego de Velázquez completed after his first visit to Italy in 1629. Critics agree that the work should be dated to 1630, the same year as his companion painting Joseph's Tunic. It appears that neither of the two paintings were commissioned by the king, although both became part of the royal collections within a short time. The painting became part of the collection of the Museo del Prado, in Madrid, in 1819.

Apollo in the Forge of Vulcan has been cited as one of the most important works from Velázquez's first trip to Italy and "one of his most successful compositions with regard to the unified, natural interaction of the figures."

== History ==
This work was created in Rome without commission at the request of the painter Peter Paul Rubens who had also visited Spain in 1629. Velázquez painted The Forge of Vulcan and Joseph's Tunic in the house of the Spanish ambassador to the Papal States. Velázquez brought back these two paintings with him to Spain.

== Subject ==
The subject is taken from Roman mythology, specifically from Ovid's Metamorphoses. The painting depicts the moment when the god Apollo, identifiable by the crown of laurel on his head, visits Vulcan. The god Apollo is telling Vulcan that his wife, Venus, is having an affair with Mars, the god of war, for whom he is forging armour at this very moment. Vulcan and his helpers are looking in surprise, some even with their mouths open.

Velázquez was inspired to create this work by an engraving by Antonio Tempesta, modifying it greatly and centering the narrative action on the arrival of Apollo, using a classical baroque style. It emphasises contemporary interest in nude figures, influenced by Greco-Roman statuary and the classical movement of Guido Reni. The frieze-style method of composition could also come from Reni. On the other hand, the clear shades of the figure of Apollo are reminiscent of Guercino.

This work was created in Rome without commission at the request of the painter Peter Paul Rubens who had also visited Spain in 1629. Velázquez painted two large canvases in the house of the Spanish ambassador. These two canvases formed a pair and were brought back to Spain with his luggage: Joseph's Tunic and Apollo in the Forge of Vulcan.

== Analysis ==
Velázquez interpreted the scene as a strictly human event, with common characters, unlike the way that Italian in which painters depicted mythological figures. Vulcan, in this picture, is just a blacksmith, and could even be said to be ugly and not at all God-like. His assistants look like common laborers. Apollo's face, despite being surrounded by an aura which differentiates him from the rest, is also not idealized.

The cave in which the blacksmith god forges weapons for the deities is shown as a smithy, similar to those Velázquez could have seen in Spain. As in many of his works, the photographic quality of the metallic objects –the armour, anvil, hammers and the red-hot iron– are depicted with realism. In the background, Velásquez painted in a bodegón-like style, a variety of objects which would be commonly found in a forge.

With this work, it is as if Velázquez "had wanted to demonstrate his control of the serene, sculptural nude and at the same time, [...] to express 'feelings'" including sorrow and surprise.

Velázquez interest in nudes is not surprising, and evidence of this appears as early as his arrival in Madrid in 1623, although depictions of nude figures in his works increased after his first visit to Italy in the years 1629–1631.

During his Italian journey he was also influenced by Venetian painting, which can be seen in his use of colour, for example in Apollo's striking orange toga. The brushwork is "lighter and freer," and color "is characterized by the subtle grays, greens, and cold mauves which will be constant in his pallette."

The influence that Michelangelo's way of drawing human body had on Velázquez can be seen in the athletic bodies of Vulcan and his assistants, who stand in positions that present their muscles to greater effect.

Velázquez was always obsessed with achieving depth in his works. In this case he used what is known as "space sandwiching", that is, putting some figures in front of others to create the perception of depth.

=== Painting materials ===
Part of pigments used by Velázquez in this painting have changed their colours so the canvas lost its original color balance. The wreath of Apollo was originally painted green by mixing (blue) azurite, yellow lake and yellow ochre. The lake pigment is not very stable and so the present color of the wreath is almost blue. The color of the loin cloths changed to flat dark brown while the flesh colour mainly containing yellow ochre, vermilion and azurite remained unchanged.

== See also ==
- List of works by Diego Velázquez

== Bibliography ==
- La pintura en el barroco. José Luis Morales y Marín. Espasa-Calpe. 1998
- Museo del Prado. Pintura española de los siglos XVI y XVII. Enrique Lafuente Ferrari. Aguilar S.A. 1964
- Cirlot, L. (dir.), Museo del Prado II, Col. «Museos del Mundo», Tomo 7, Espasa, 2007. ISBN 978-84-674-3810-9, pp. 24–25
- McKim-Smith, Gridley; Andersen-Bergdoli, Greta; Newman, Richard (1988). Examining Velazquez. Yale University.
- Velázquez and The Surrender of Breda: The Making of a Masterpiece. Anthony Bailey. Henry Holt and Company. 2011
