= Equestrian Portrait of Philip III =

Painting by Diego Velázquez

- Felipe III a caballo (Spanish)
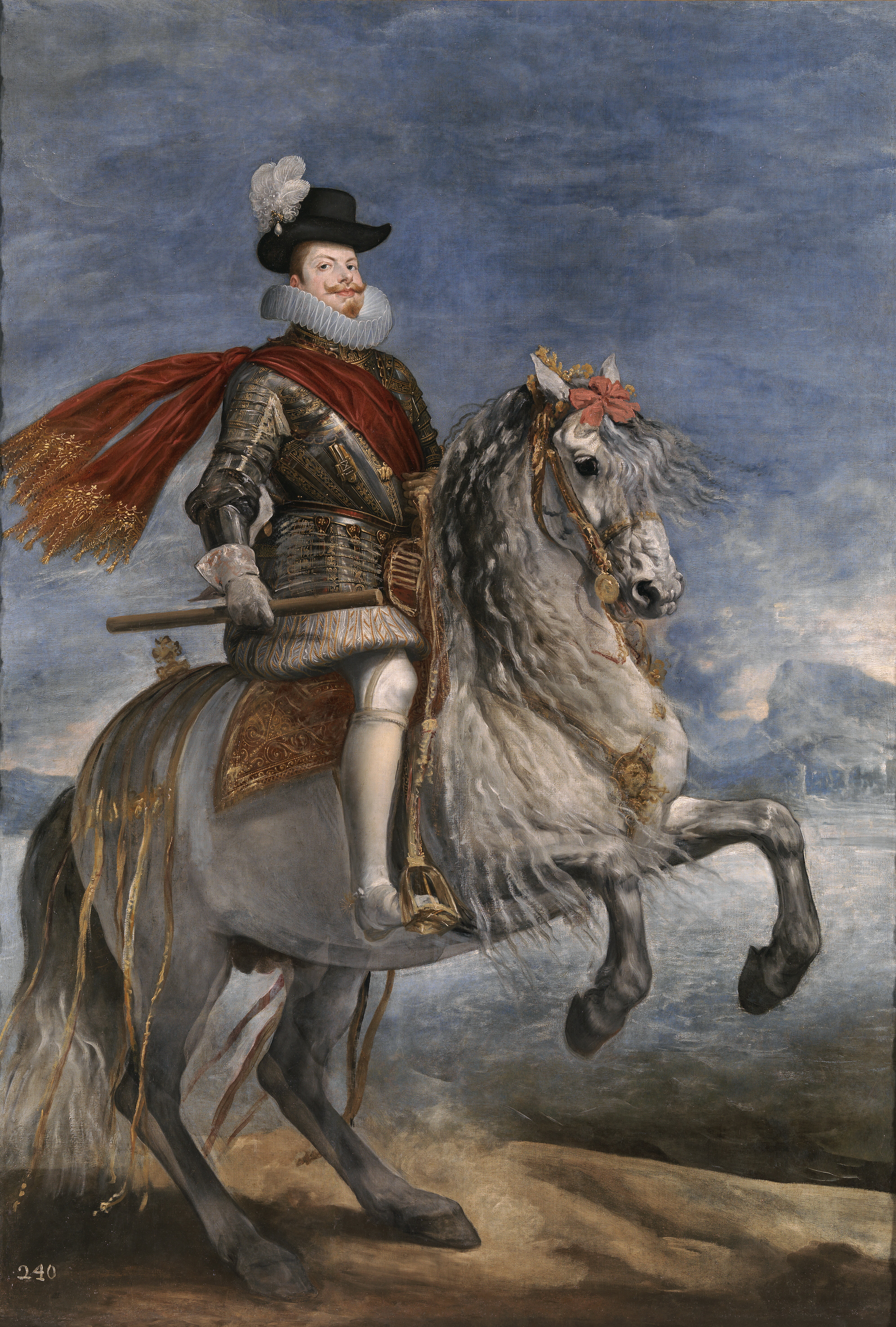
- Artist: Diego Velázquez
- Year: 1634–1635
- Medium: Oil on canvas
- Dimensions: 300 cm × 212 cm (120 in × 83 in)
- Location: Museo del Prado; Madrid

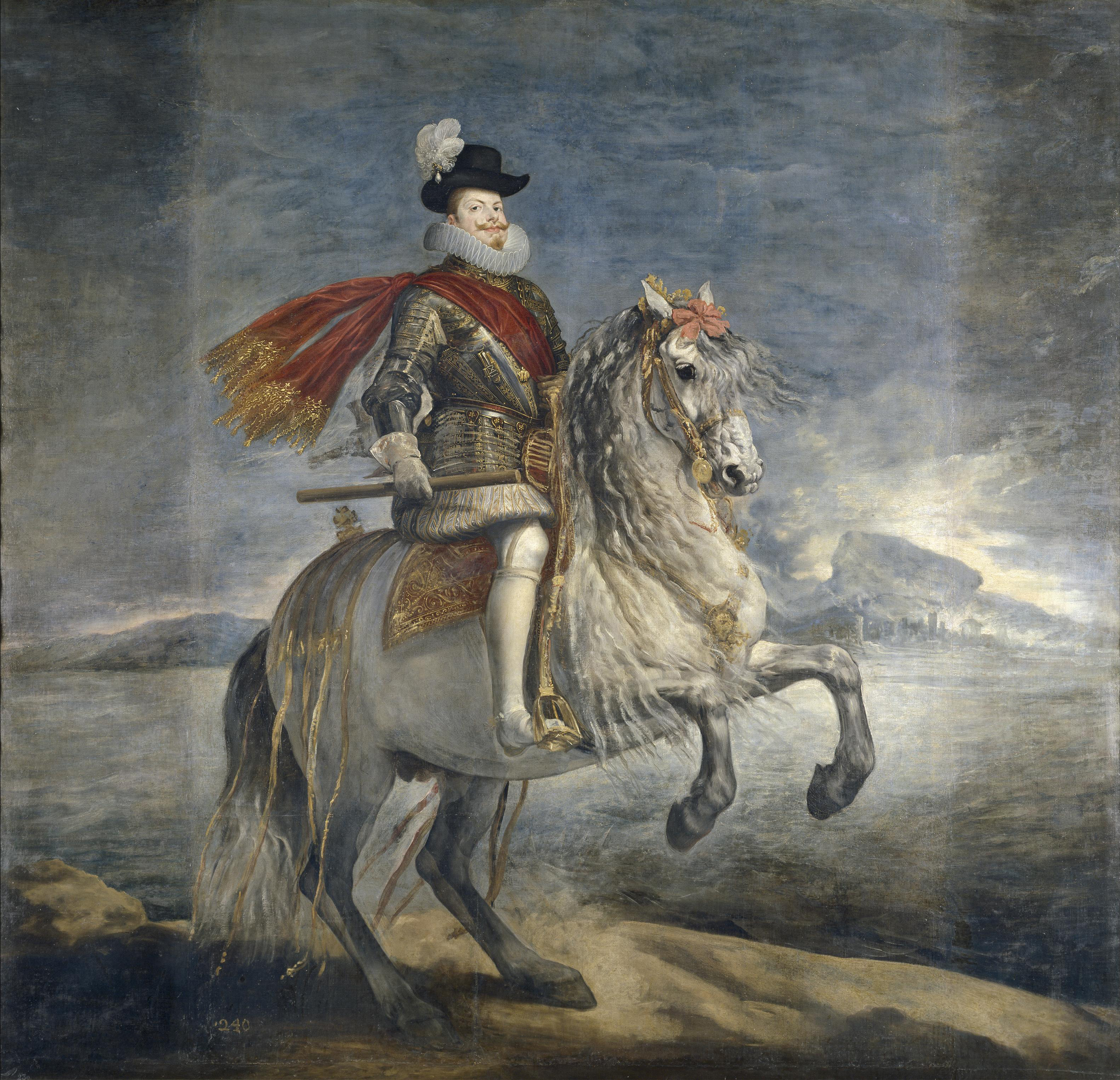
Portrait before 2011 restoration (300 cm x 314 cm)

The Equestrian Portrait of Philip III is a portrait of Philip III of Spain on horseback by Diego Velázquez. It was painted in 1634/35, more than a decade after the subject's death in 1621, as part of a series of paintings of the royal family. Intended to be displayed in the Hall of Realms, originally a wing of the Buen Retiro Palace in Madrid, it is now in the Prado Museum.

The portrait was commissioned by Philip III's son Philip IV. It was painted for the decoration of the Hall of Realms of the Buen Retiro Palace, along with the equestrian portraits of Phillip III's wife, Queen Margaret, Philip IV, Isabella of France, and Prince Baltasar Carlos. The studio of the artist is believed to have made a significant contribution to the painting.

== See also ==
- List of works by Diego Velázquez
