= Diana and a Nymph Surprised by a Satyr =

C. 1625 painting by Anthony van Dyck

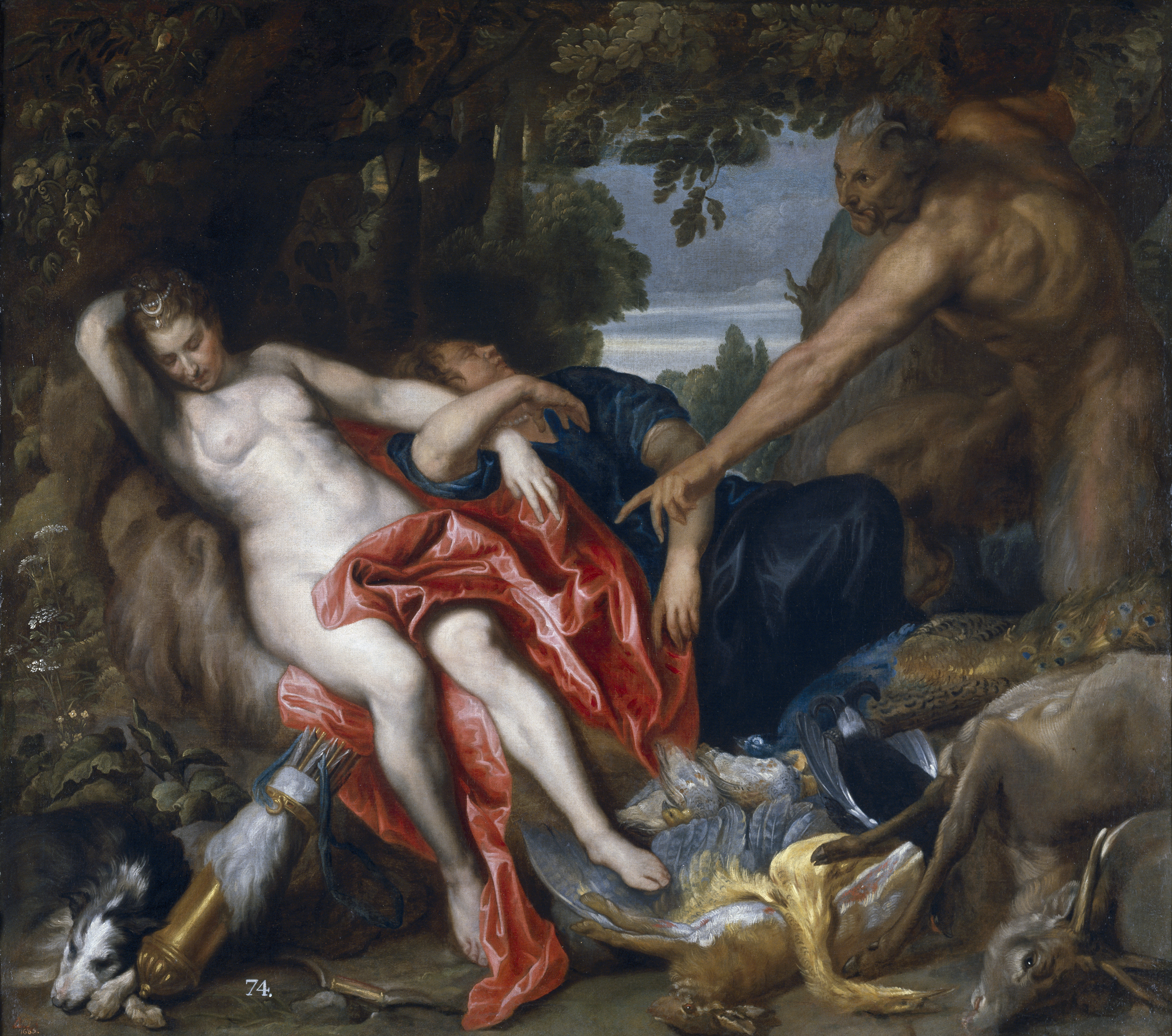
- Artists: Anton van Dyck and Frans Snyders
- Year: 1622-1627
- Medium: Oil on canvas
- Dimensions: 144 cm × 163 cm (57 in × 64 in)
- Location: Museo del Prado

Diana and a Nymph Surprised by a Satyr is a 1622–1627 oil on canvas painting resulting from a collaboration between Anton van Dyck and Frans Snyders.

It entered the Spanish royal collections and was first recorded at the new Palacio Real de Madrid, next to Guardajoyas. It remained there until 1747, when it moved to infante don Luis's room at the Palacio del Buen Retiro. It was moved again in 1772 to the Casón del Buen Retiro and remained there until 1794, when it became part of the collection at the Museo del Prado, where it still hangs. It was mis-titled Diana and Endymion Surprised by a Satyr in an 1857 Prado catalogue and was only reidentified in 2002, when the figure to Diana's right was shown to be female rather than Endymion.

== See also ==
- List of paintings by Anthony van Dyck
