= Equestrian Portrait of Prince Balthasar Charles =

Painting by Diego Velázquez

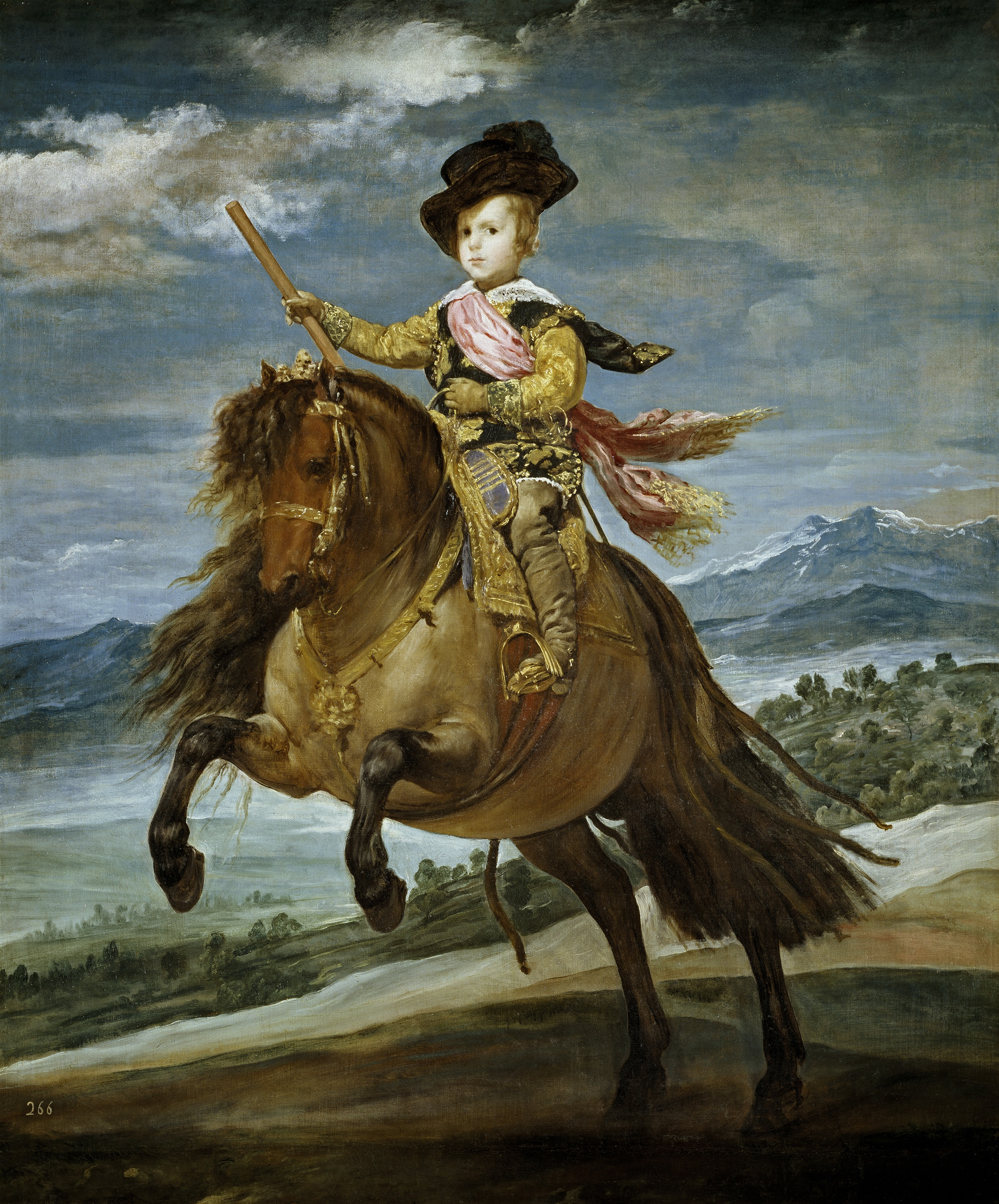
- Artist: Diego Velázquez
- Year: 1635
- Medium: Oil on canvas
- Dimensions: 209 cm × 173 cm (82 in × 68 in)
- Location: Museo del Prado, Madrid

The Equestrian Portrait of Prince Balthasar Charles is a portrait of Balthasar Charles, Prince of Asturias on horseback, painted in 1634–35 by Diego Velázquez. It is now in the Prado Museum.

== History ==
Velázquez was commissioned to paint a series of equestrian portraits for the Hall of Realms, originally a wing of the Buen Retiro Palace in Madrid. This work was meant to fill the gap on top of the door, between two larger equestrian portraits of the prince's parents, Philip IV and Elisabeth of France.

== Description ==
The painting is a significant evolution in Velázquez's use of color, showing a chromatic brilliance far superior to his previous works.

In this portrait, the prince appears to be five or six years old and is depicted sitting upright in the saddle on a brown pony, projecting an attitude of nobility and power. Velázquez painted the prince's face with thinly painted, light brushstrokes, achieving a "flesh-and-blood embodiment of the young prince's spirited features." The pale tone of the face and the blonde hair create a striking contrast against the matte black of the slouch hat.

In his right hand, he holds a field marshal's baton, a symbol of military authority granted to him by virtue of his rank as a royal prince. The prince's calm demeanor while seated on a rearing horse in a levade pose, has a political significance, representing him as a confident horseman and a strong leader; his authority symbolized by the baton, the sword and the military sash on his chest, according to Simona Di Nepi.

He is dressed in a gold-woven doublet, a buff coat and dark green breeches embellished with gold embroidery. The ensemble is completed by suede boots, a ruff, and a black hat adorned with a feather. Golden highlights are abundant throughout the composition, especially in the horse's tack (saddle, stirrups, halters and sash) and in the prince's hair.

Painted for a high lintel, Velázquez distorted the horse’s barrel, making it immensely round so that viewed from below, it would appear proportionate, according to Enrique Lafuente Ferrari. The background is the Sierra de Guadarrama, painted with sweeping, liquid strokes of turquoise and white, capturing the cold, crystalline air of the Madrid mountains.

The Wallace Collection also has an equestrian portrait of the prince, attributed to the studio of Velázquez.

== Gallery ==
The two larger equestrian portraits of the prince's parents, Philip IV and Elisabeth of France, that were placed on the two sides of this painting.

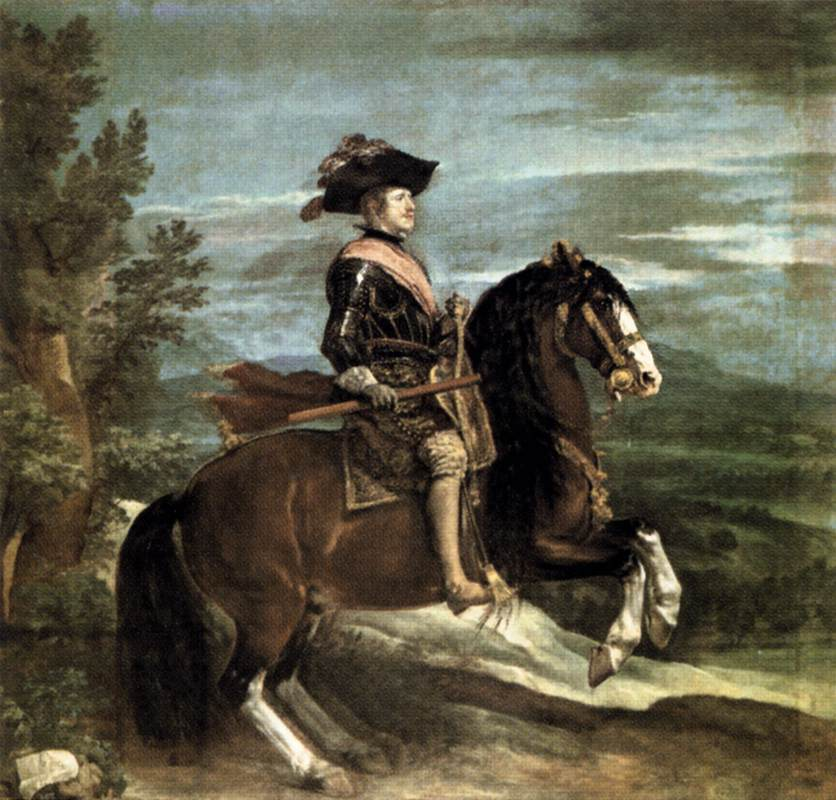
Equestrian Portrait of Philip IV by Diego Velázquez (1635–36). Museo del Prado

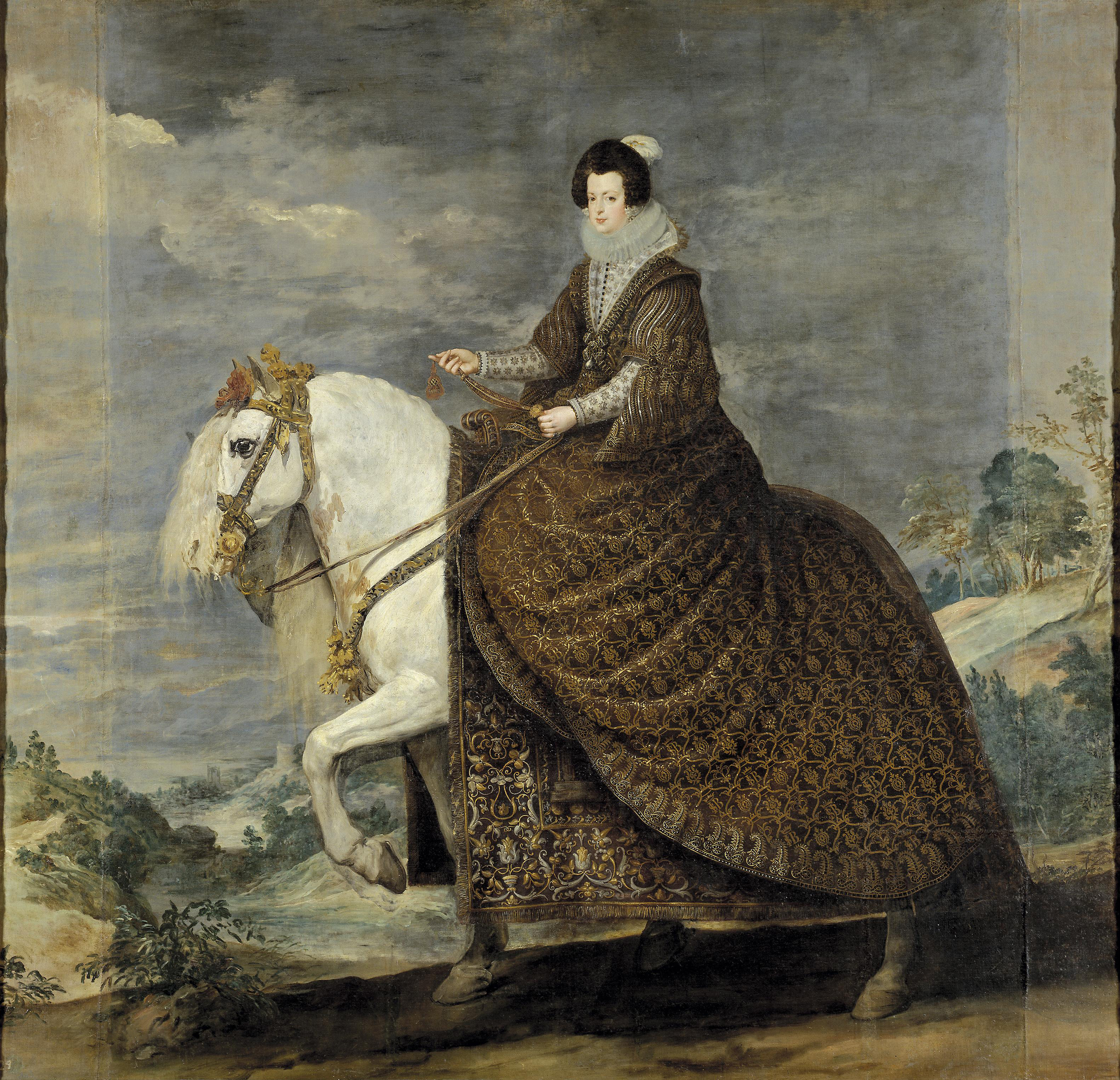
Equestrian Portrait of Elisabeth of France by Diego Velázquez (c. 1635) Museo del Prado

== See also ==
- List of works by Diego Velázquez
