= Equestrian Portrait of Philip IV =

1635–1636 painting by Diego Velázquez

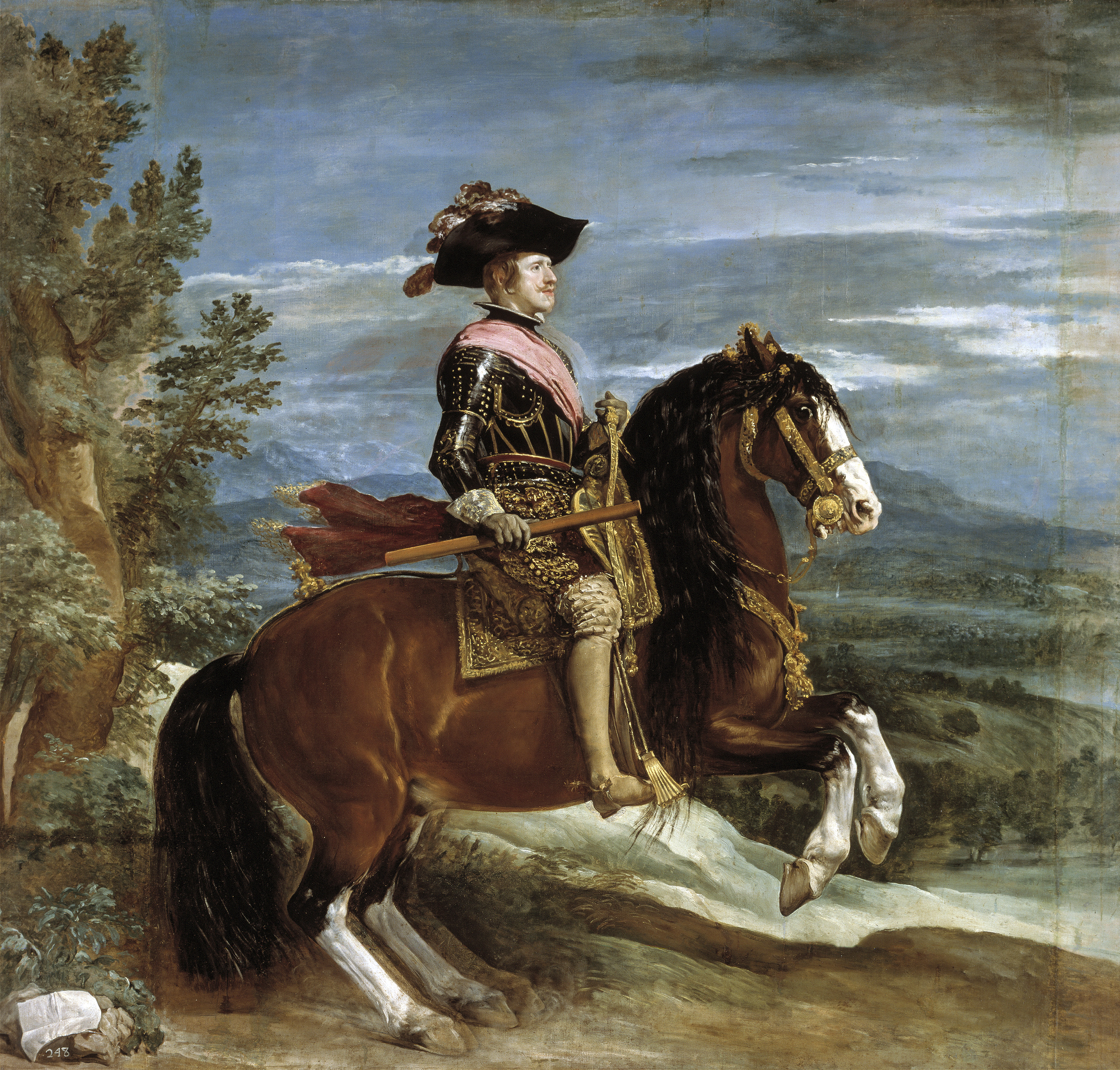
- Artist: Diego Velázquez
- Year: 1635–1636
- Medium: Oil on canvas
- Dimensions: 301 cm × 314 cm (119 in × 124 in)
- Location: Museo del Prado; Madrid

The Equestrian Portrait of Philip IV was a portrait of Philip IV of Spain on horseback, painted by Diego Velázquez in 1635–36 as part of a series of equestrian portraits for the Hall of Realms, originally a wing of the Buen Retiro Palace in Madrid (a series that also included that of Philip's son prince Balthasar Charles).

== See also ==
- List of works by Diego Velázquez
