= Hall of Realms =

17th-century building in Madrid

Coordinates: 40°24′57″N 3°41′26″W

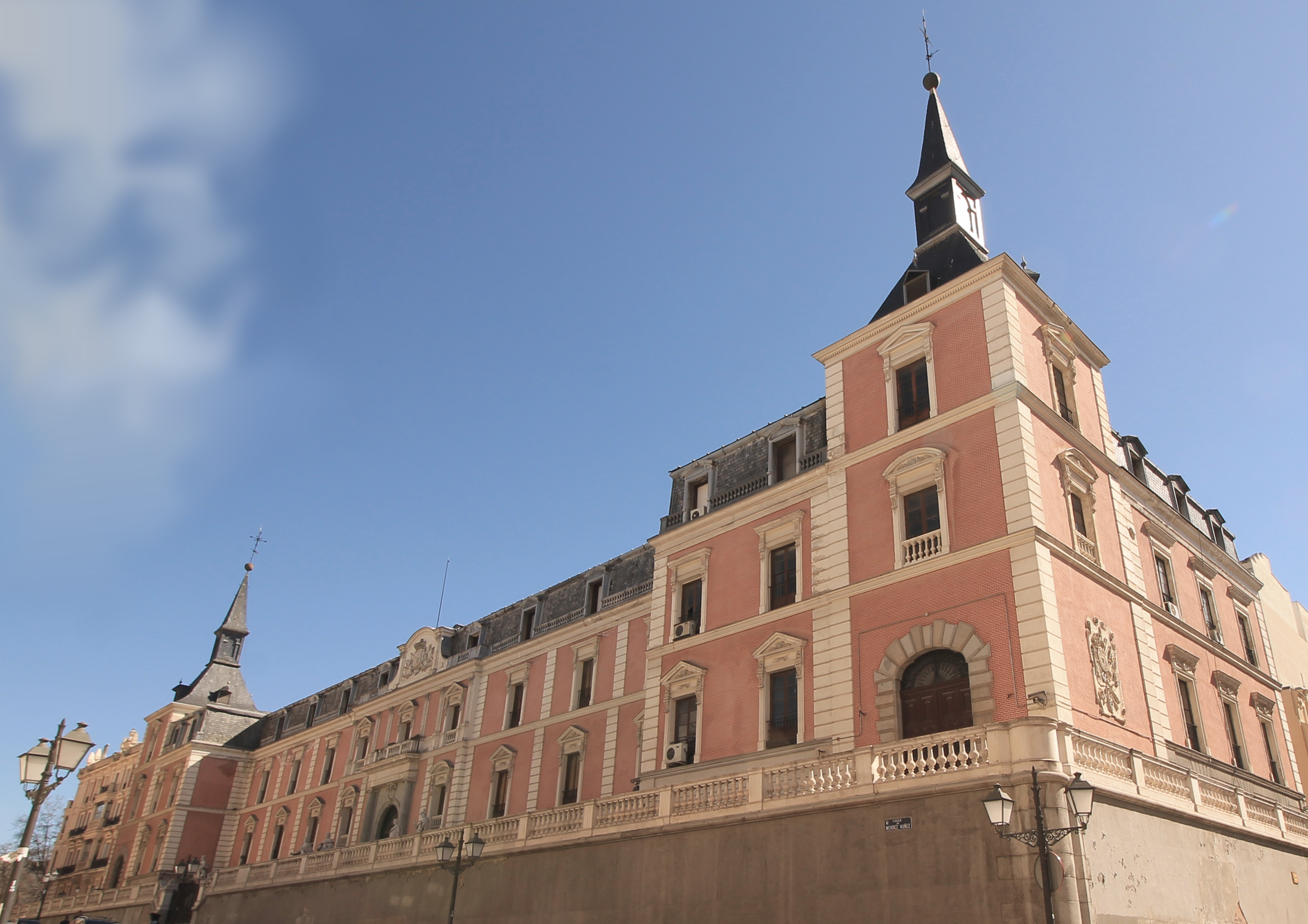
Exterior of the Salón de Reinos

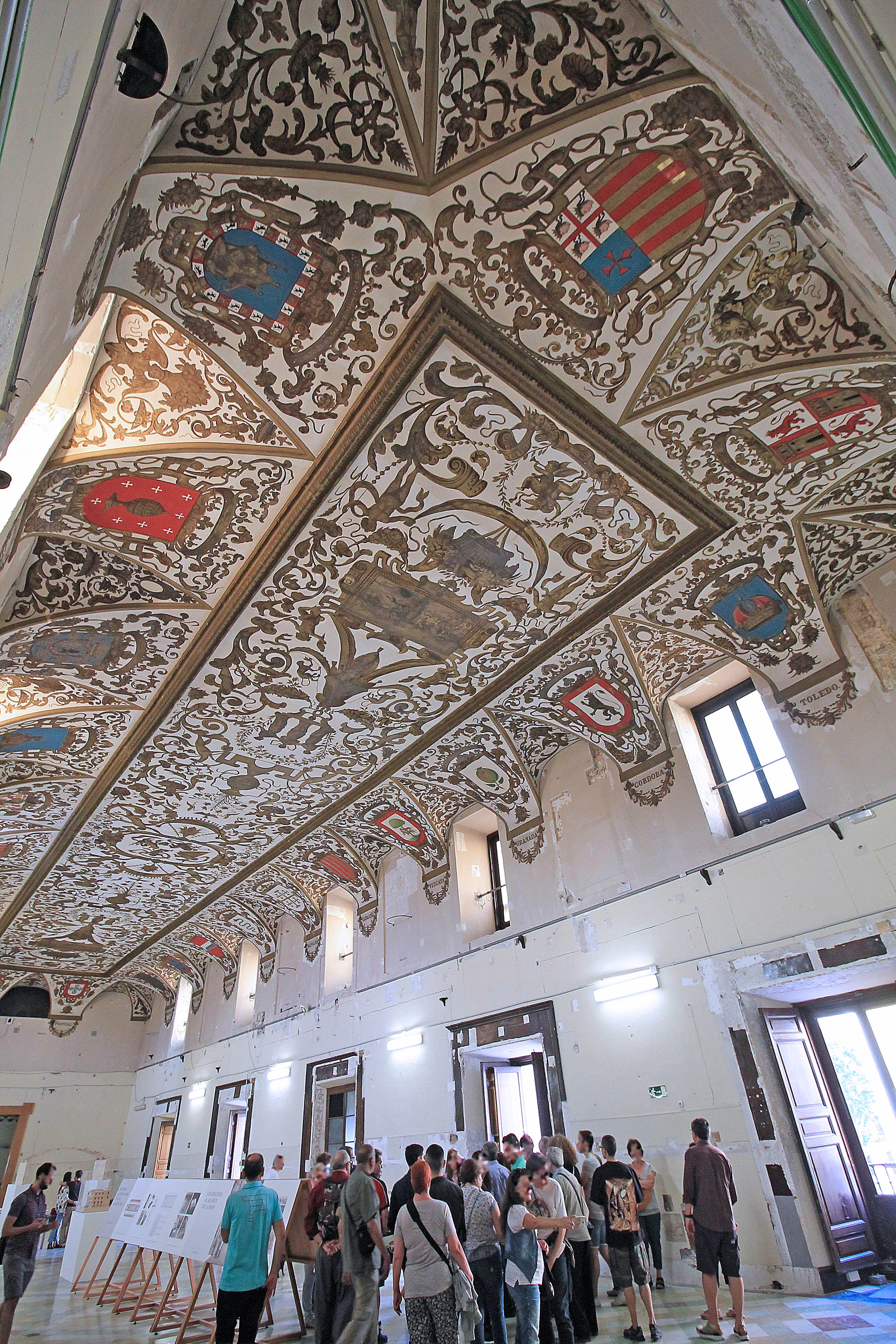
Partial view of the interior

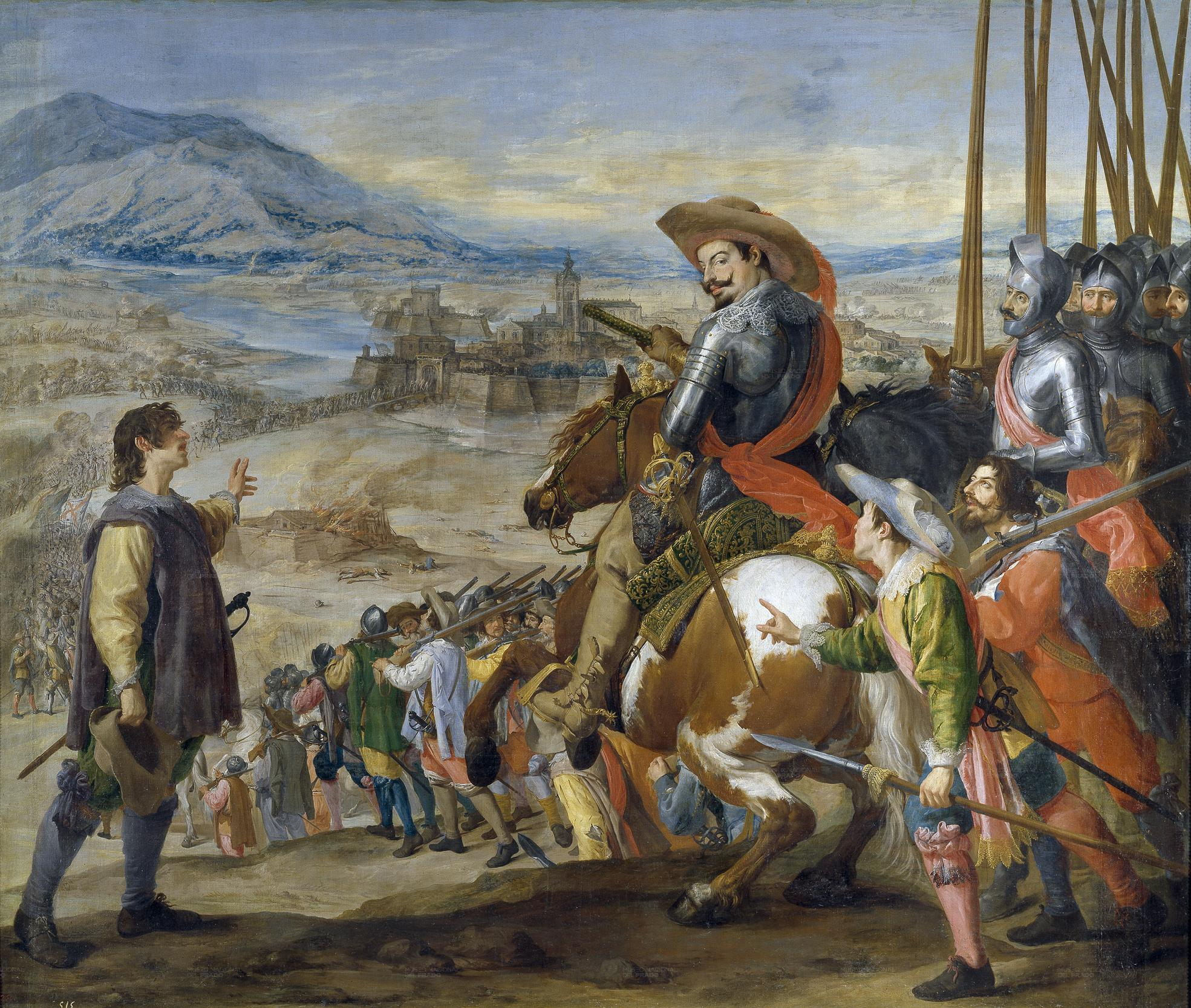
The Relief of Brisach by Jusepe Leonardo – one of the battle paintings which originally decorated the Salón de Reinos

The Salón de Reinos (translated as "Hall of the Kingdoms" or "Hall of Realms") or salón grande ("great hall") is a 17th-century building in Madrid, originally a wing of the Buen Retiro Palace. The Salón de Reinos and the Casón del Buen Retiro are the only survivors of the original grand scheme of the palace. Built between 1630 and 1635, the Hall of Realms housed the largest paintings in the royal collection, now all in the Museo del Prado. It is named after its paintings of the coats of arms of the 24 kingdoms which formed the Kingdom of Spain at the time of Philip IV of Spain.

The building served as the Museo del Ejército from 1841 to 2010 when the military collections were put on display at the Alcázar of Toledo.

The Prado Museum acquired the vacant building to display part of its collections and made its renovation the subject of an architectural competition. The brief was to redesign the space as part of the campus of the art museum for its 200th anniversary. It was won in 2016 by a scheme from the British firm Foster and Partners and the Spanish firm Rubio Arquitectura.

== Decoration of the room ==
Originally intended as a place from which the king could watch and assist in theatrical productions in the courtyard, the Salón de Reinos was turned into a throne room when it was decided to turn Buen Retiro into a full palace. It was still used for spectacles and soirees, so a balcony was added so that festivities could be viewed from above, but as a throne room it had to impress ambassadors and other distinguished members of the courts of Europe who visited the palace. This meant the room's decoration was the most sumptuous in the whole palace, well-illuminated by several windows between jasper tables and silver lions and with a ceiling covered in grotesques. There were also wall paintings full of political symbolism with the ultimate aim of glorifying Philip IV. The designer of the room's decorative programme is unknown, though ultimate responsibility lay in the hands of the conde duque de Olivares himself, along with Jerónimo de Villanueva (who gave the lions and effected the payments) and with the intellectual advice of Francisco de Rioja and of the painters closest to Philip and Olivares, Juan Bautista Maíno and Velázquez.

The Salón de Reinos is rectangular in plan, with narrow doors on the two longer sides. On its north and south sides hung twelve paintings (one now lost) on the theme of the major battles won by the armies of Philip IV in the early years of his reign. Between these paintings, and above the Salón's windows, were ten paintings by Zurbarán showing the labours of Hercules, comparing the exploits of the demi-god Hercules (then considered as the ancestor of the House of Habsburg) with those of the king.

The battle paintings juxtaposed examples by artists of the older generation such as Vicente Carducho or Eugenio Cajés (who had both served Philip III of Spain) with ones by younger artists trained in naturalism such as Juan Bautista Maíno, Zurbarán (summoned from Seville for this very commission), Jusepe Leonardo, Félix Castelo (who did his first major work there), Antonio de Pereda and especially Velázquez, Philip IV's favourite.

At the east and west ends were portraits by Velázquez of the royal family. The series was made up of equestrian portraits of Philip III and his wife Margaret of Austria (both on the west wall) and equestrian portraits of Philip IV and his wife Elisabeth of France either side their son and heir Balthasar Charles (all three on the east wall). These five paintings' distribution and staggered positioning exemplified the concepts of hereditary monarchy and dynastic continuity.

Based on the titles held by Philip IV, the hall also contained shields showing the coats of arms of the twenty-four kingdoms and realms that made up his monarchy: Aragon, Archduchy of Austria, Lordship of Biscay, Duchy of Burgundy, Duchy of Brabant, Castile and León, Principality of Catalonia, Córdoba, County of Flanders, Galicia, Granada, Jaén, Mexico, Duchy of Milan, Murcia, Naples, Navarre, Peru, Portugal, Sardinia, Seville, Sicily, Toledo and Valencia (Philip IV also held the titles of Count of Habsburg, Count of Tyrol, and Lord of Molina, among others).

== Paintings ==
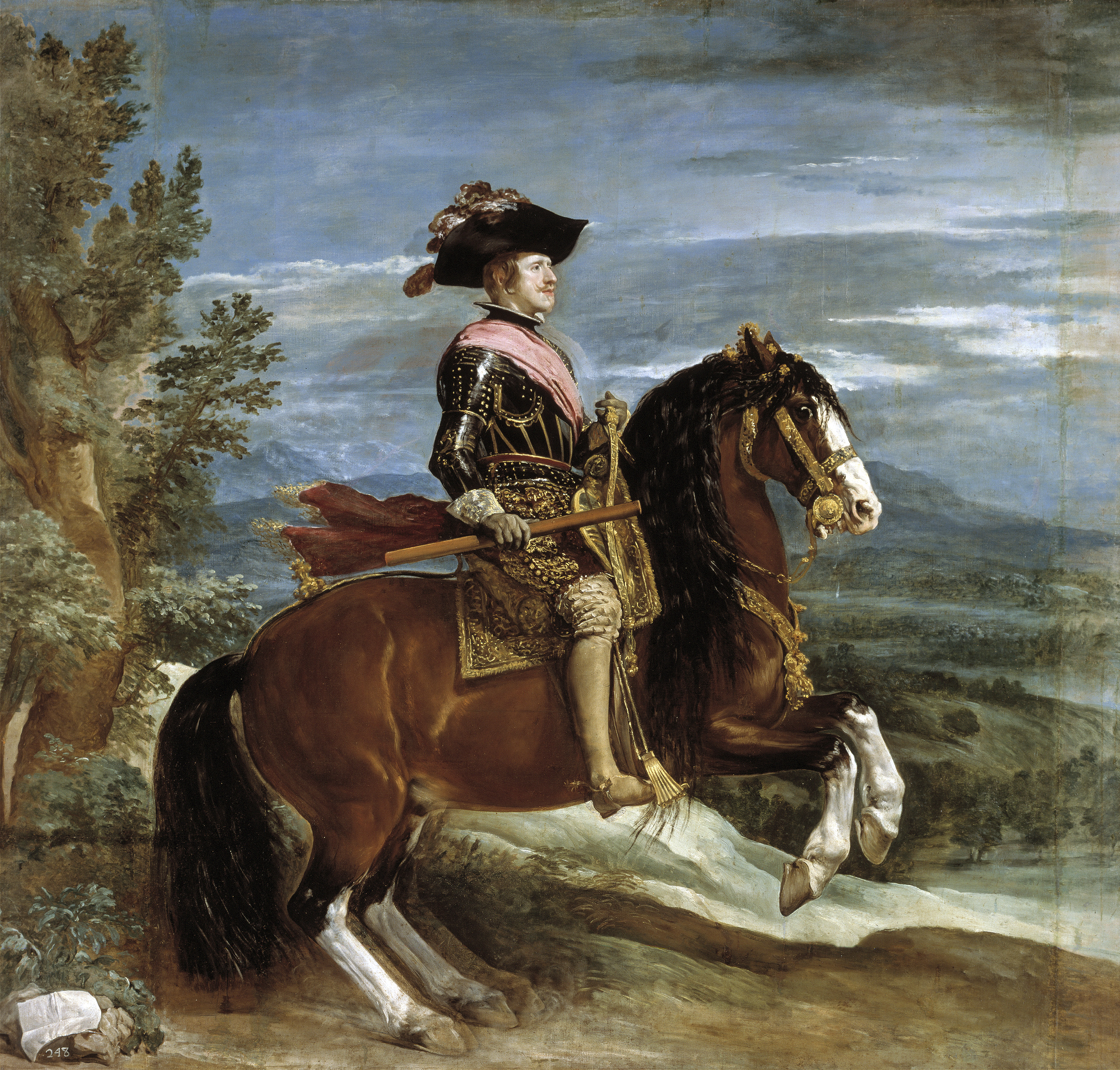
Equestrian Portrait of Philip IV, by Velázquez

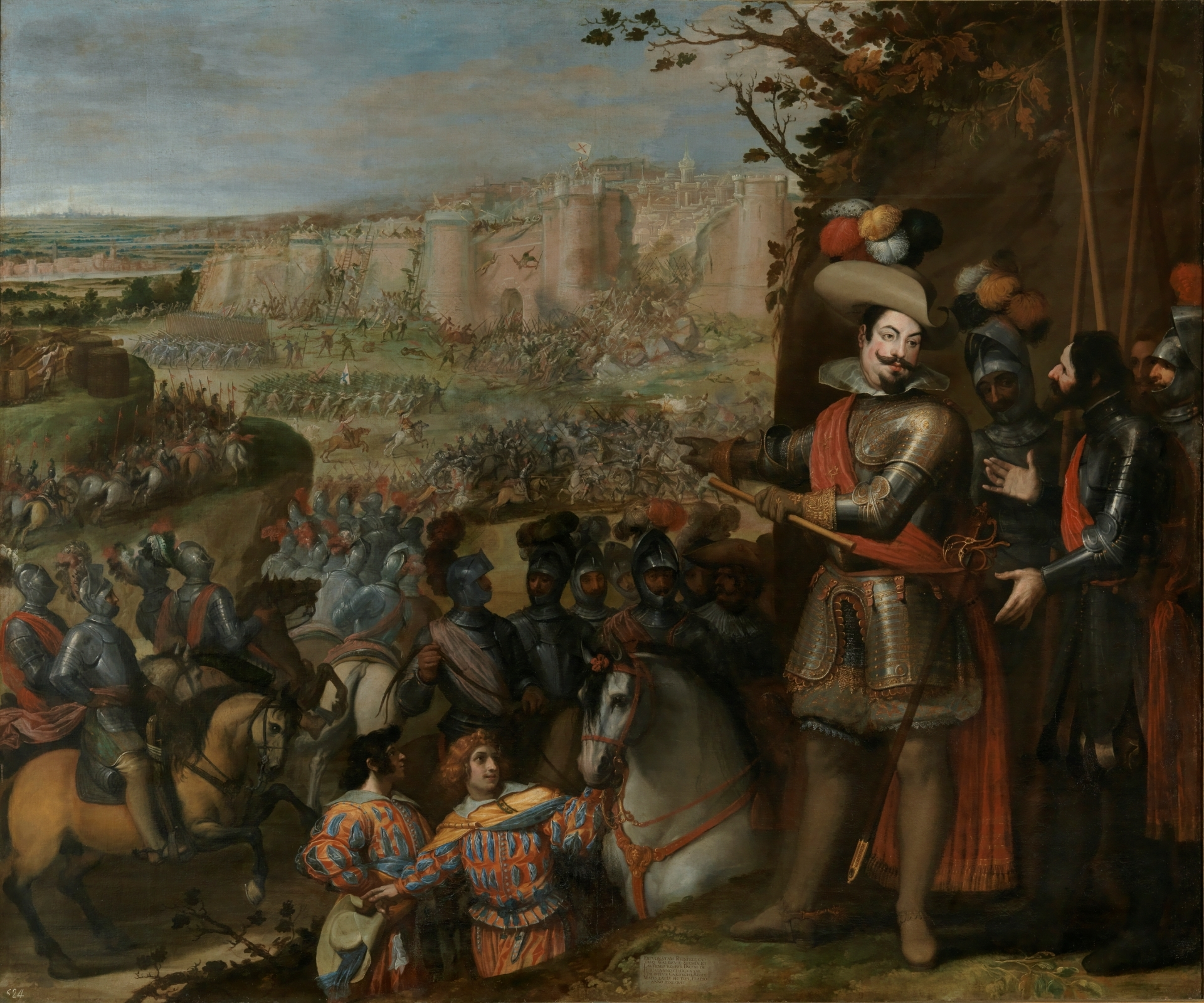
The capture of Rheinfelden by Vicente Carducho

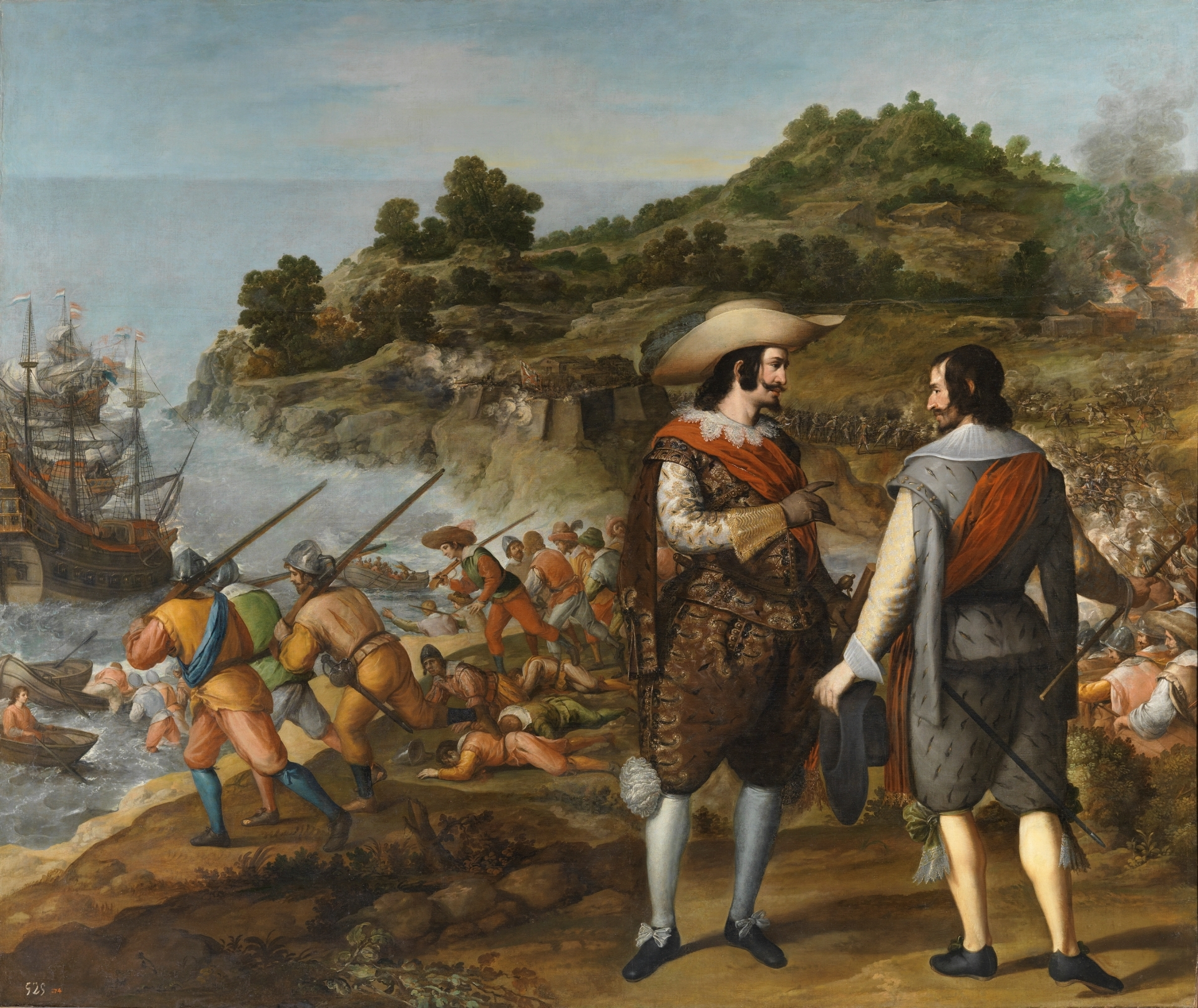
The recovery of the island of Puerto Rico by Don Juan de Haro by Eugenio Cajés

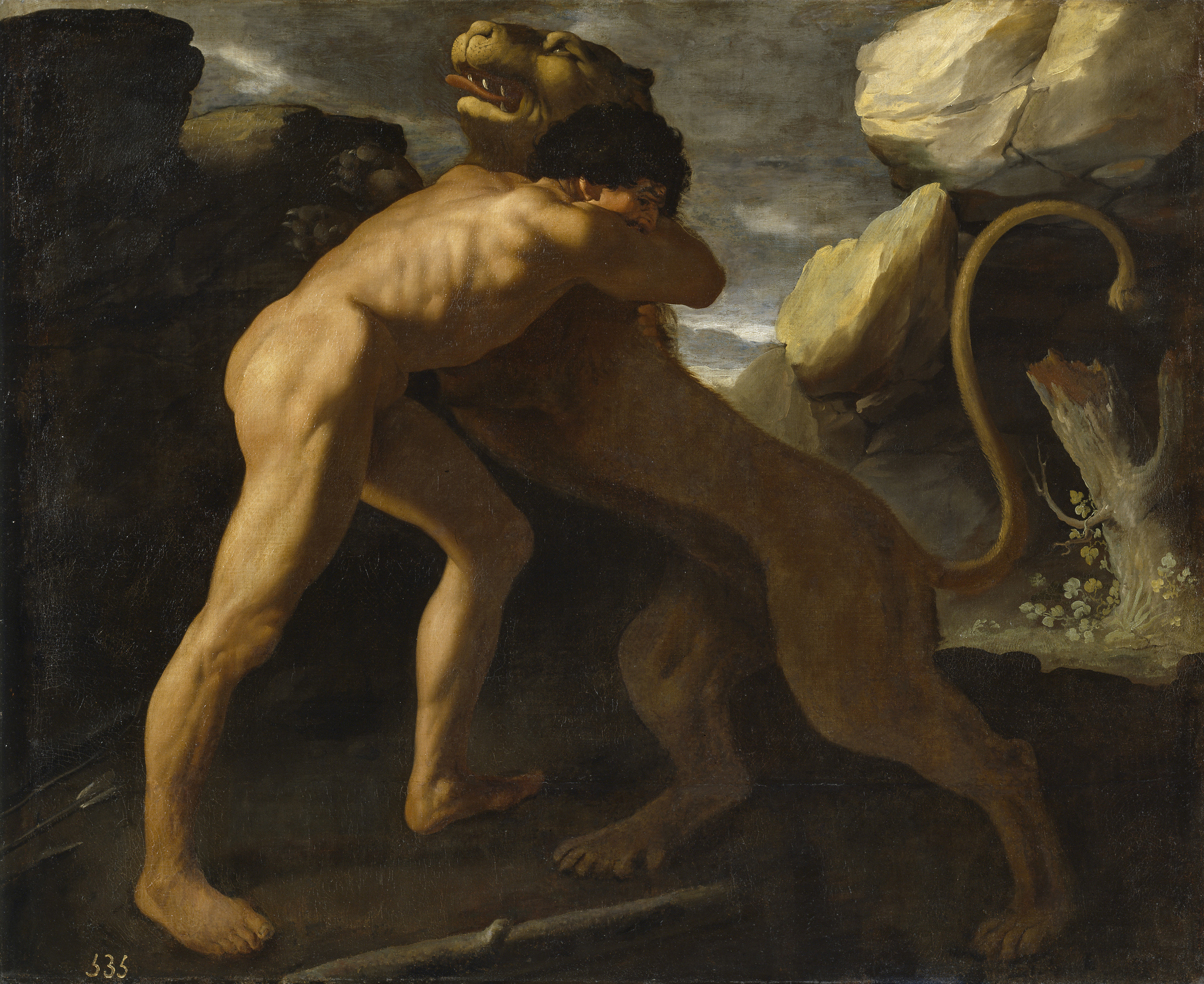
Hercules wrestling with the Nemean lion by Zurbarán

The layout of the portraits and battle paintings in the Salón, based on the reconstruction produced by Jose Alvarez Lopera, which is in turn based on the Silva topográfica by Manuel de Gallegos and the 1701 inventory, is as follows:

=== West wall (main entrance) ===
Three works by Velázquez:

- Equestrian Portrait of Philip IV
- Equestrian Portrait of Elisabeth of France
- Equestrian Portrait of Prince Balthasar Charles

=== East wall (behind the throne) ===
- Equestrian Portrait of Philip III, by Velázquez and workshop
- Equestrian Portrait of Margarita of Austria, by Velázquez

=== North wall ===
- The expulsion of the Dutchmen from the island of San Martin by the Marquis of Cadreita, by Francisco de Zurbarán (lost).
- The capture of Rheinfelden by Vicente Carducho. Oil on canvas (297 x 357 cm), Museo Nacional del Prado.
- The Relief of Brisach by Jusepe Leonardo. Oil on canvas (304 x 360 cm), Museo Nacional del Prado.
- The relief of the Plaza de Constanza, Vicente Carducho. Oil on canvas (297 x 374 cm), Museo Nacional del Prado.
- The recovery of the island of Puerto Rico by Don Juan de Haro, Eugenio Cajés. Oil on canvas (290 x 344 cm), Museo Nacional del Prado.
- The recovery of the island of San Cristobal by Don Frederic of Toledo, Felix Castelo. Oil on canvas (297 x 311 cm), Museo Nacional del Prado.

=== South wall ===
- The Recovery of Bahia by Juan Bautista Maíno. Oil on canvas (290 x 370 cm), Museo Nacional del Prado.
- The Relief of Genoa by the second Marquis of Santa Cruz, by Antonio de Pereda y Salgado. Oil on canvas (290 x 370 cm), Museo Nacional del Prado.
- The victory at Fleurus, by Vicente Carducho. Oil on canvas (297 x 365 cm), Museo Nacional del Prado.
- The surrender of Juliers by Jusepe Leonardo. Oil on canvas (307 x 381 cm), Museo Nacional del Prado.
- The Surrender of Breda, by Diego Velázquez. Oil on canvas (307 x 367 cm), Museo Nacional del Prado.
- The defense of Cadiz against the English, by Zurbarán. Oil on canvas (302 x 323 cm). Museo Nacional del Prado.

=== Trials of Hercules ===
Over the windows were paintings of the trials of Hercules by Zurbarán, all 130 cm x 160 cm, all oil on canvas, all now in the Prado:

- Hercules and the Cretan bull.
- Hercules's struggle with Antaeus.
- Hercules' struggle with the Erymanthian boar.
- Hercules diverting the river Alpheus.
- Hercules and Cerberus.
- Hercules wrestling with the Nemean lion.
- Hercules fights the Hydra of Lerna.
- Hercules closes the straits of Gibraltar.
- Hercules kills king Gerion.
- Death of Hercules.

== Later history ==
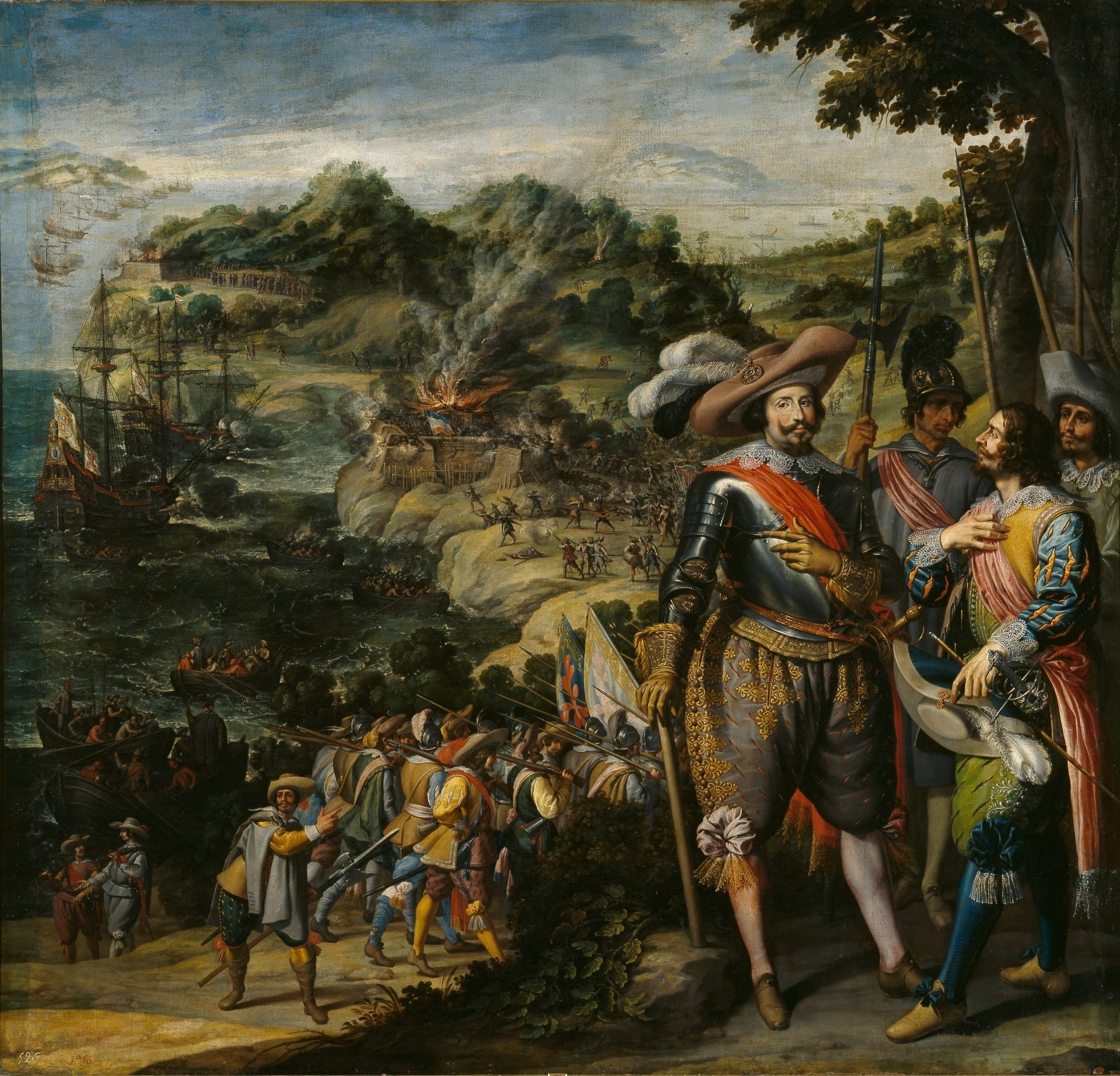
The recovery of the island of San Cristobal by Don Frederic of Toledo by Felix Castelo

The Salón de Reinos, and the Salón de Fiestas (now the Casón del Buen Retiro) were the only parts of the palace to survive the intense French bombardment between 1808 and 1814 during the Peninsular War and the appearance of the buildings were transformed by post-war rebuilding. For a long time (since 1841) the Salón de Reinos housed the Museo del Ejército.

=== Restoration project ===
In the early 21st century the Spanish Ministry of Culture launched a series of studies and reforms to move the Army museum to a larger, better and more modern setting at the Alcázar of Toledo, giving the Hall of Realms over to the Prado, which already had responsibility for the Casón and which could then return the Salón de Reinos to its 17th-century appearance and reinstate the paintings originally meant for it. This would be all the easier since the wall paintings, ceiling paintings and grotesques were still well preserved. However, the initial proposal caused a debate on the building's final use, with some opposing it since it would separate works by Velázquez such as The Surrender of Breda from his other works in the Prado, and others since they felt that such a move was unjustified just to recreate a single room.

The redesign of the building was the subject of a competition, and in 2017 displays relating to the winning proposal were shown in an exhibition in the Telefónica Building, Madrid, about the work of the architect Norman Foster. A comparison was drawn with an earlier project by the same architect, the Carré d'Art in Nîmes where he was working in proximity to an ancient temple. The team of Foster and Rubio envisaged the Salon stripped of some of its post 17th century accretions and combined with modernistic features.

Completion of the restoration has been much delayed. The Museo del Ejército reopened in Toledo in July 2010. The works on the Salón de Reinos to convert it for the use of the Prado were originally expected to occur from 2010 to 2012, with a budget of 42.5 million Euros. In the aftermath of the financial crisis, deadlines went by, and in 2016 the project to add the building to the Museo del Prado’s campus was being presented as part of the Museum’s 200th anniversary celebrations which were scheduled for 2019. In the event, funding was put on hold until 2021.

Pending the beginning of building work, there has been scope to give over the Salón de Reinos and its adjoining rooms to activities such as temporary exhibitions. In 2017 the artist Cai Guo-Qiang used the Hall of Realms for 8 works of art using gun-powder.

== Bibliography ==
- (in Spanish) PÉREZ SÁNCHEZ, Alfonso E. (1992). Pintura barroca en España 1600-1750. Madrid : Ediciones Cátedra. ISBN 84-376-0994-1.
- (in Spanish) BROWN y J. H. ELLIOT, Jonathan (1985). Un palacio para el rey. El Buen Retiro y la corte de Felipe IV. Madrid : Alianza Editorial. ISBN 84-292-5111-1.
- (in Spanish) GARRIDO PÉREZ, Carmen (1992). Velázquez. Técnica y evolución. Madrid : Museo del Prado. ISBN 84-87317-16-2.
- (in Spanish) LÓPEZ TORRIJOS, Rosa (1985). La mitología en la pintura española del Siglo de Oro. Madrid : Cátedra. ISBN 84-376-0500-8.
- (in Spanish) Corpus velazqueño. Documentos y textos (2000), Madrid, Ministerio de Educación, Cultura y Deporte, ISBN 84-369-3347-8
