= Equestrian Portrait of Elisabeth of France =

c. 1635 painting by Diego Velázquez

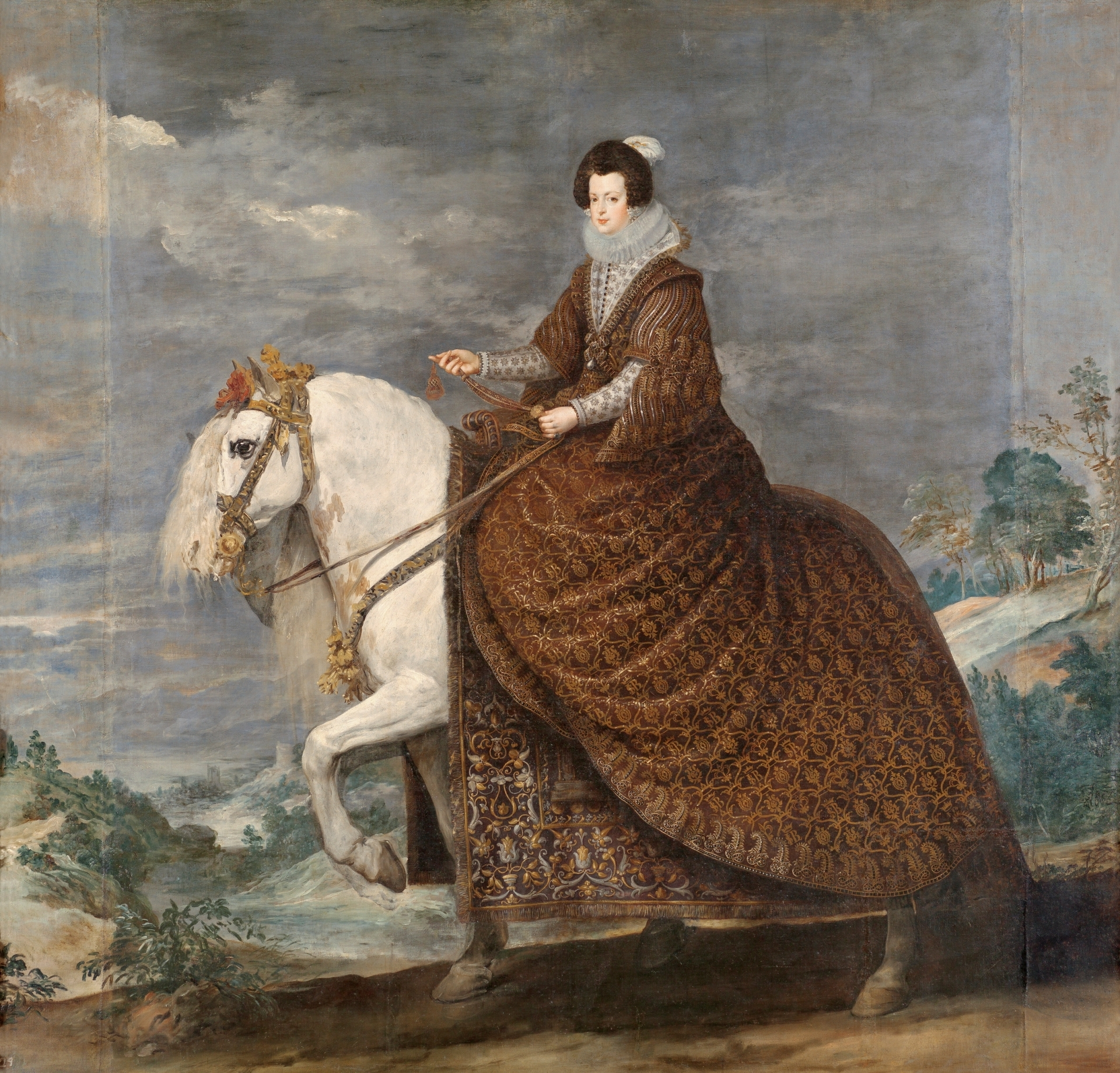
- Artist: Diego Velázquez
- Year: c. 1635
- Medium: Oil on canvas
- Dimensions: 301 cm × 314 cm (119 in × 124 in)
- Location: Museo del Prado; Madrid

The Equestrian Portrait of Elisabeth of France was painted by Diego Velázquez of Elisabeth of France circa 1635, originally for the Hall of Realms, originally a wing of the Buen Retiro Palace in Madrid. It has been in the Museo del Prado since the gallery's institution in 1819.

== History of the work ==
Velázquez had been commissioned to paint a series of five equestrian portraits of the royal family

- Felipe III and his wife Queen Margaret of Austria,
- Felipe IV, his wife Elizabeth of France and their son Baltazar Carlos. This last was smaller than those of the other family members, as it was intended to be hung on a door and therefore viewed from a lower perspective.

This work of Velázquez had significant input from members of his workshop. The technical studies conducted in the Prado Museum under the direction of Carmen Garrido indicated that the five equestrian portraits were painted at the same time and with the same preparation. The idea that Velázquez retouched a painting by an earlier painter to add detail to the queen's clothing and the trappings of the horse has received support from a number of critics; X-rays reveal a painting under the visible one, in which the horse's girth is visible and the queen's clothing is simpler than the existing one. Later, when Velázquez was finishing details in the queen's head and the horse's legs, a more patient painter filled in the meticulous details of the embroidery, thus obscuring details of the painting previously laid down.

== Description of the work ==
The queen is depicted in profile, wearing a jacket with embroidered stars and a gold-embroidered skirt with her arms and initials. The horse is depicted as an overo with a long mane and forelock falling over its face, doing the passage gait; it is facing left in order to provide symmetry with the portrait of Elisabeth's husband, in which work he is facing right.

== See also ==
- List of works by Diego Velázquez
