= The Recovery of Bahía de Todos los Santos =

Painting by Juan Bautista Mayno

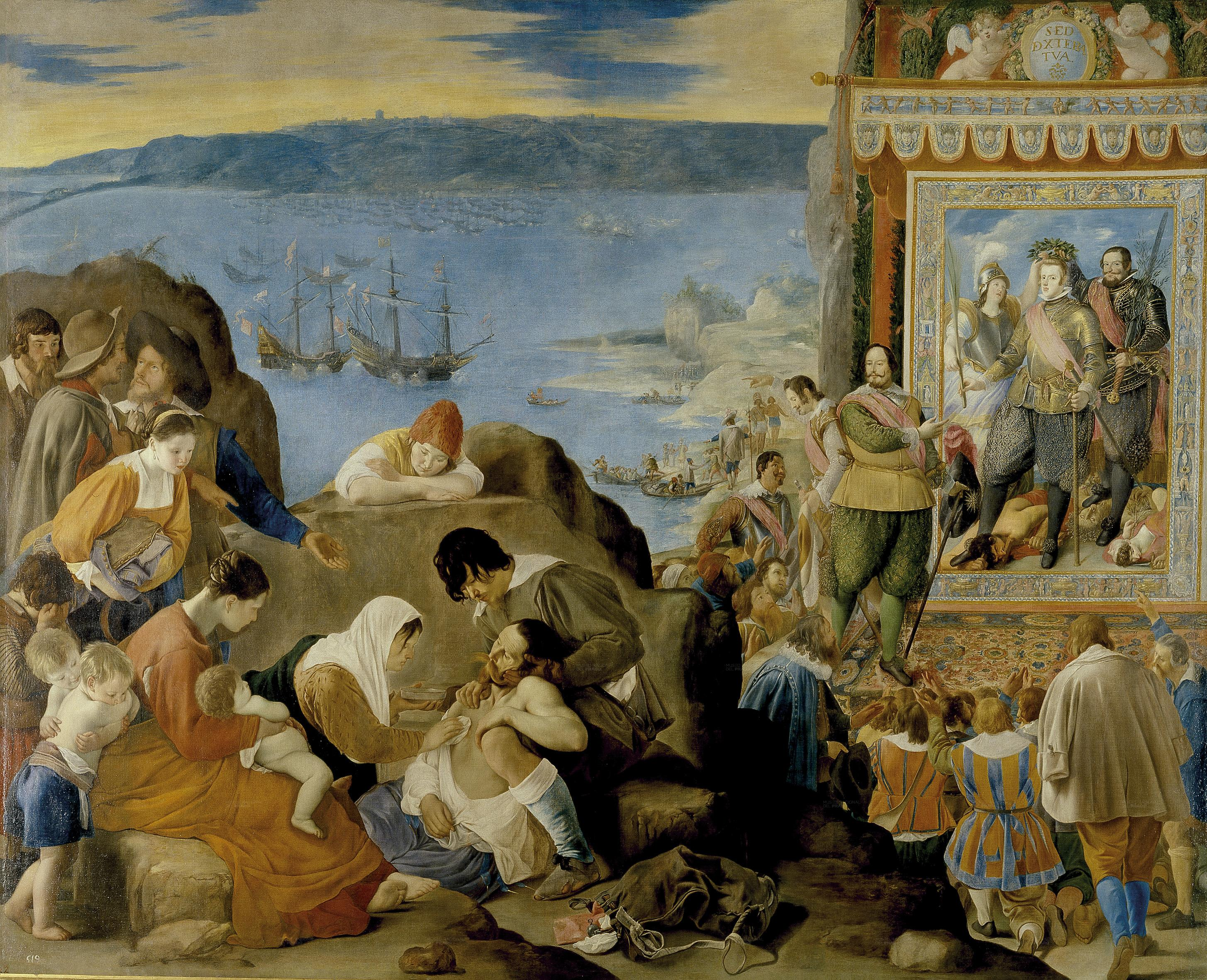
- Artist: Juan Bautista Maíno
- Year: 1634–1635
- Medium: Oil on canvas
- Dimensions: 309 cm × 381 cm (122 in × 150 in)
- Location: Museo del Prado; Madrid

The Recovery of Bahía de Todos los Santos is a mature work by the Spanish painter Juan Bautista Maíno (1580–1649). It was painted between 1634 and 1635 and commemorates the recapture of the Brazilian port of Salvador da Bahia from the Dutch by Fadrique Álvarez de Toledo y Mendoza in May 1625 and its return to the Portuguese Empire. Originally in the Salón de Reinos for which it was painted, it is now in the Prado Museum, in Madrid.

The painting avoids triumphalism and shows the suffering of war. In the right background Fadrique Álvarez beckons to an allegorical portrait of Philip III of Portugal trampling War, Wrath and Heresy and being crowned with laurels by Victoria and the Conde-Duque de Olivares. In front of the portrait are men celebrating the victory, but in the rest of the foreground is the aftermath of the battle, with men, women and children surrounding, helping and watching a wounded soldier, embodying Piety, Charity and Suffering.
