= Equestrian Portrait of Margarita of Austria =

1634 painting by Diego Velázquez

- La reina Margarita de Austria a caballo (Spanish)
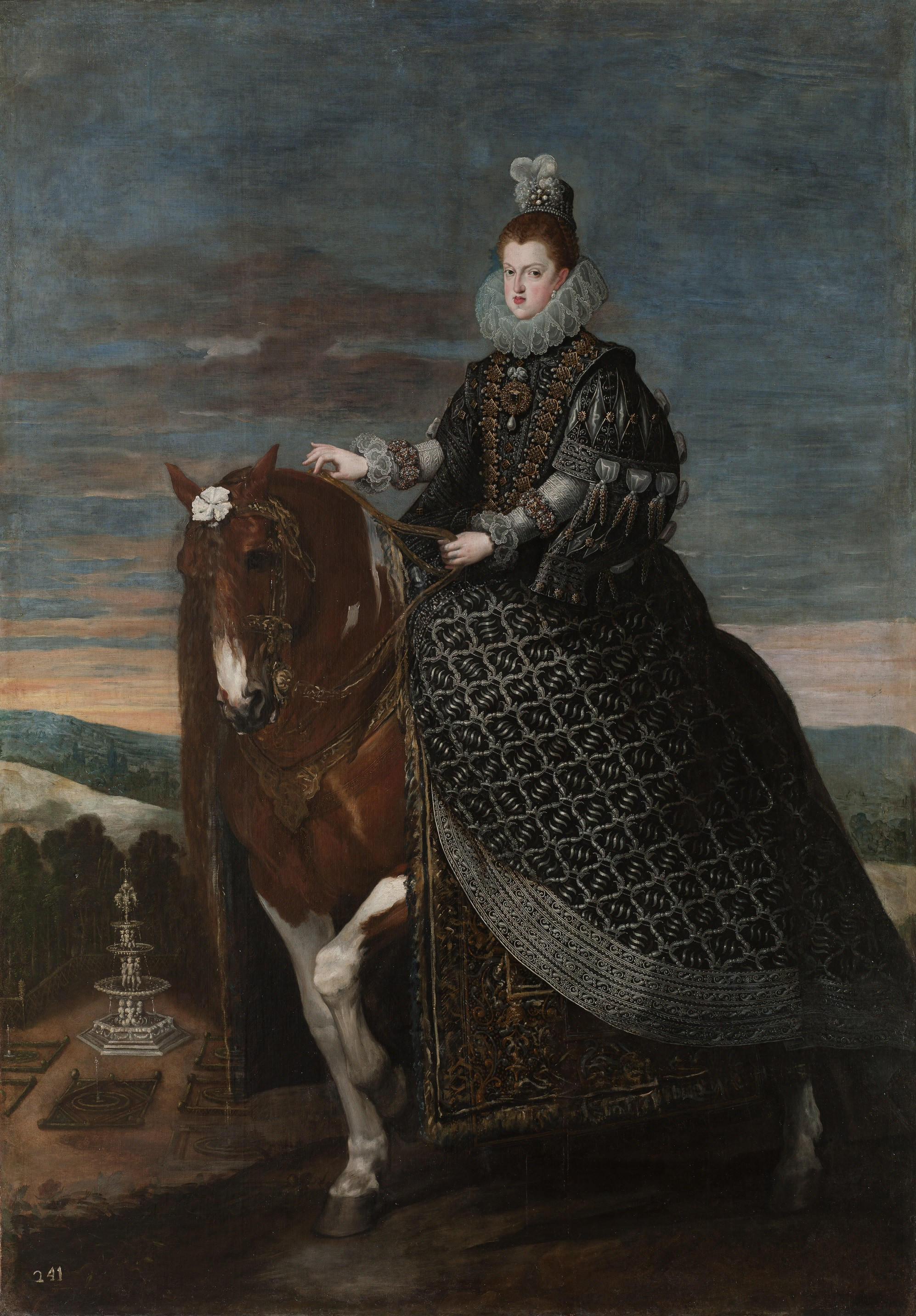
- Artist: Diego Velázquez
- Year: 1634
- Medium: Oil on canvas
- Dimensions: 297 cm × 212 cm (117 in × 83 in)
- Location: Museo del Prado; Madrid

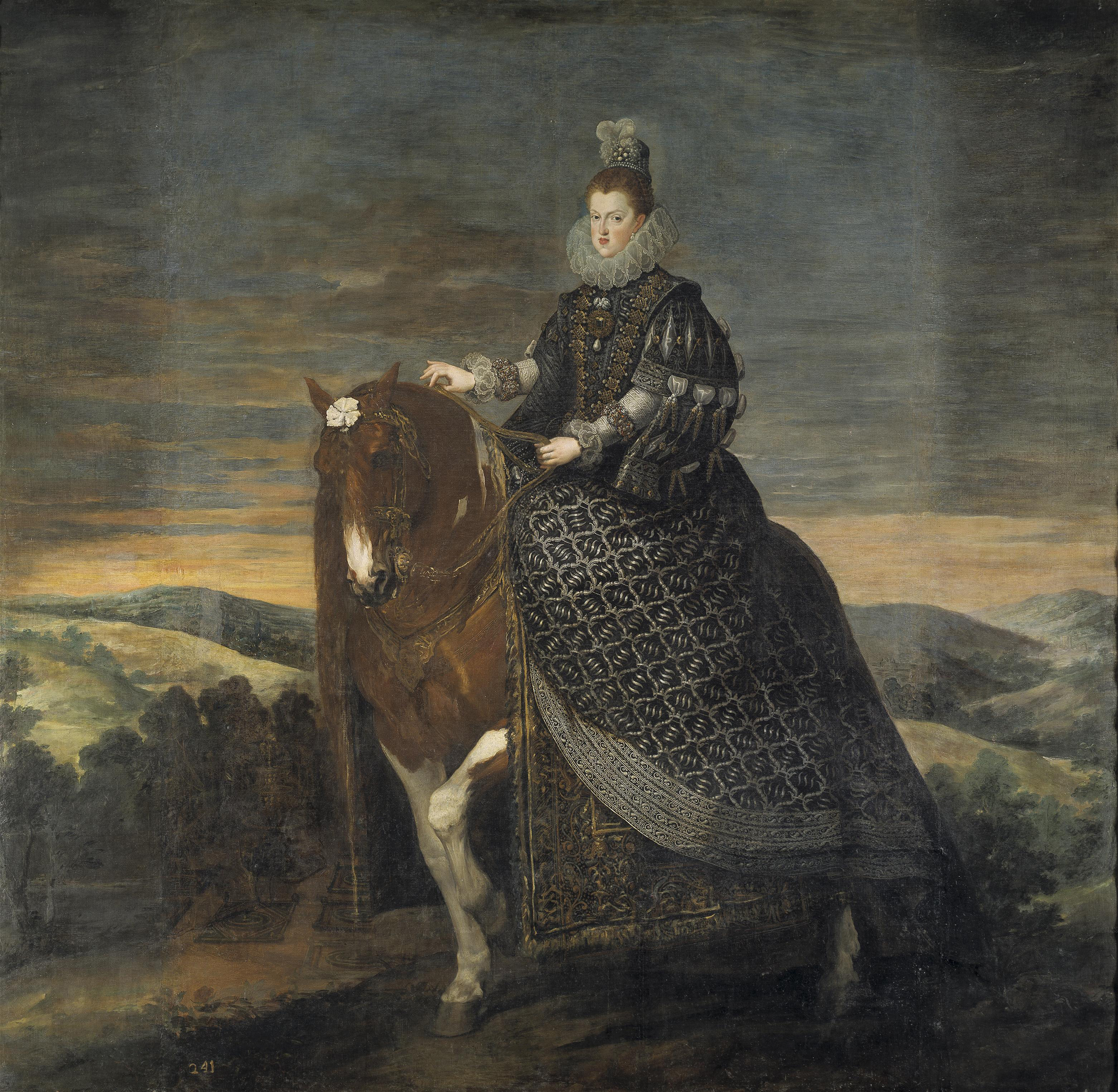
Portrait before 2011 restoration (297 cm x 309 cm)

The Equestrian Portrait of Margarita of Austria is a 1634 portrait of Margaret of Austria, Queen of Spain on horseback by Velázquez, originally shown at the Hall of Realms of the Buen Retiro Palace in Madrid and now in the Prado Museum.

== History of the work ==
Velázquez had been commissioned to paint a series of five equestrian portraits of the royal family, Felipe III, his wife Queen Margaret of Austria, Felipe IV, his wife Elizabeth of France and their son Baltazar Carlos. This last was smaller than those of the other family members, as it was intended to be hung on a door and therefore viewed from a lower perspective.

As with the portrait of her husband, this portrait of Margarita evidences input from Velázquez' workshop. Velázquez retouched the work which his workshop produced, retouching the horse's harness in particular; this was originally very detailed. The same stroke fluidity can be observed in the redone head of the queen, but this process was reversed in the horse's mane and some portions of the landscape in the background, albeit hidden in the underlying technique of the painting. This may be Velázquez' work.

== Description of the work ==
The figure of the queen appears in an ornate dress, adorned with two pieces of jewelry known to belong to the Austrians, the pearl known as "La Peregrina" and the square-cut diamond called "El Estanque". The horse, posed in the 'passage' gait, is facing left, in order to mirror the horse posed in Margarita's husband's portrait, which faces to the right.

== See also ==
- List of works by Diego Velázquez
