= Museo de Arte Moderno (Madrid) =

Museum of Modern Art
- Museo de Arte Moderno
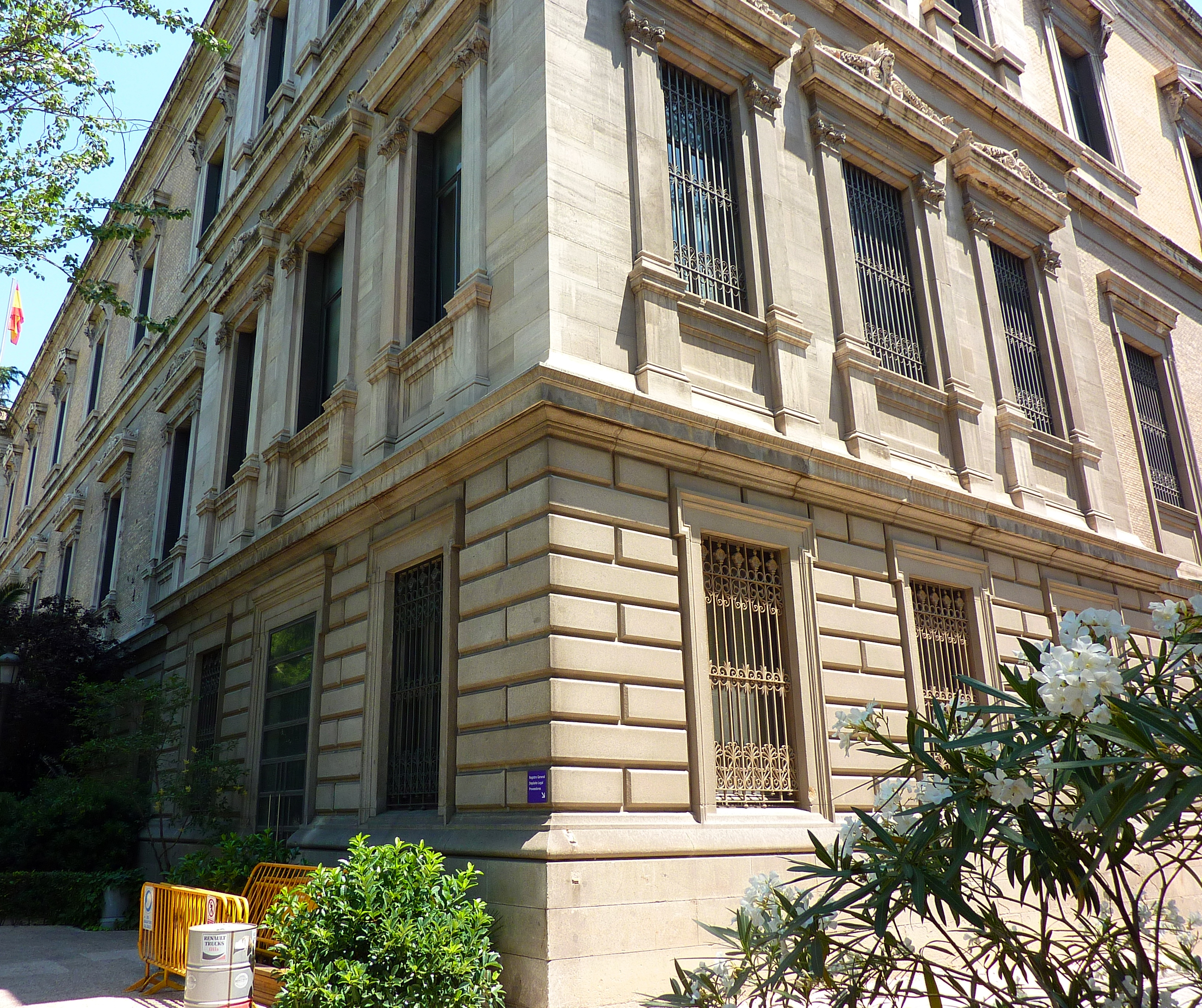
- Former museum building
- Established: August 1, 1898
- Dissolved: February 5, 1971; 55 years ago
- Location: Paseo de Recoletos, 20; Madrid, Community of Madrid, Spain
- Coordinates: 40°25′24″N 3°41′24″W
- Type: Art museum

The Museum of Modern Art (Museo de Arte Moderno or M.A.M.) was the Spanish national museum dedicated to 19th- and 20th-century painting. It was set up in 1894. It closed in 1971, when its 19th-century collections were merged into those of the Museo del Prado, but housed at the Casón del Buen Retiro, and its 20th-century collections formed into the Spanish Museum of Contemporary Art (Museo Español de Arte Contemporáneo or MEAC), the predecessor of the present-day Museo Nacional Centro de Arte Reina Sofía.
