= The Brazen Serpent (Jusepe Leonardo) =

Painting by Jusepe Leonardo

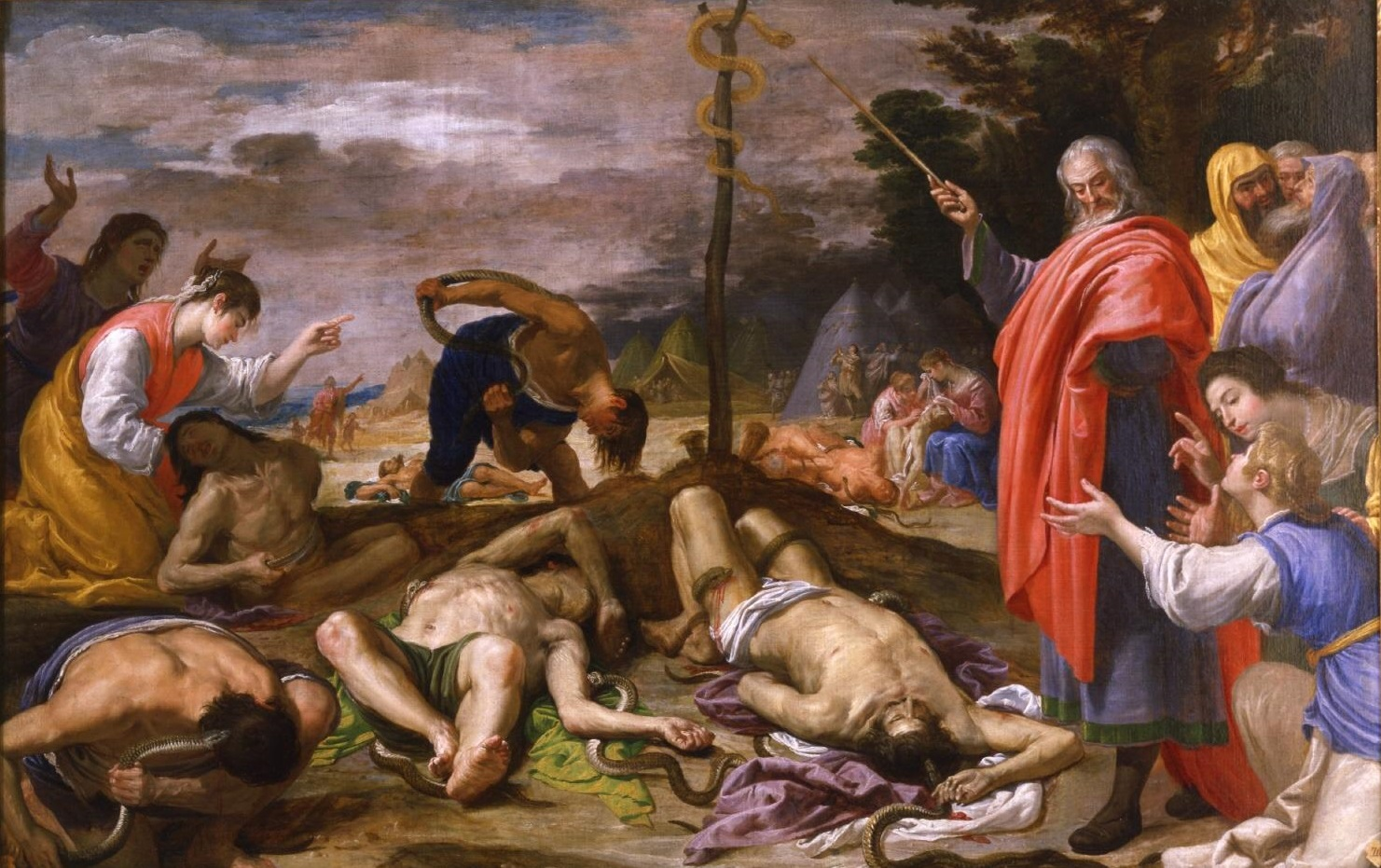
- Artist: Jusepe Leonardo
- Year: 1630–1640
- Medium: oil on canvas
- Dimensions: 132 cm × 203 cm (52 in × 80 in)
- Location: Real Academia de Bellas Artes de San Fernando, Madrid

The Brazen Serpent is a 1630–1640 painting by the Aragonese artist Jusepe Leonardo, now in the Real Academia de Bellas Artes de San Fernando in Madrid. It shows the story from Book of Numbers 21: 6–9. In one of the recurrent protests of the Israelites against God and Moses, they are punished by sending poisonous snakes that cause the death of many by their bite. Repentant, they beg Moses to help them. God commands Moses to make a metal sculpture (copper or bronze depending on the version) and for those bitten to fix their eyes on it. Those who do are cured of the sting. Moses, wearing a red tunic, indicates with his rod the saving action offered to the wounded.
