= Casón del Buen Retiro =

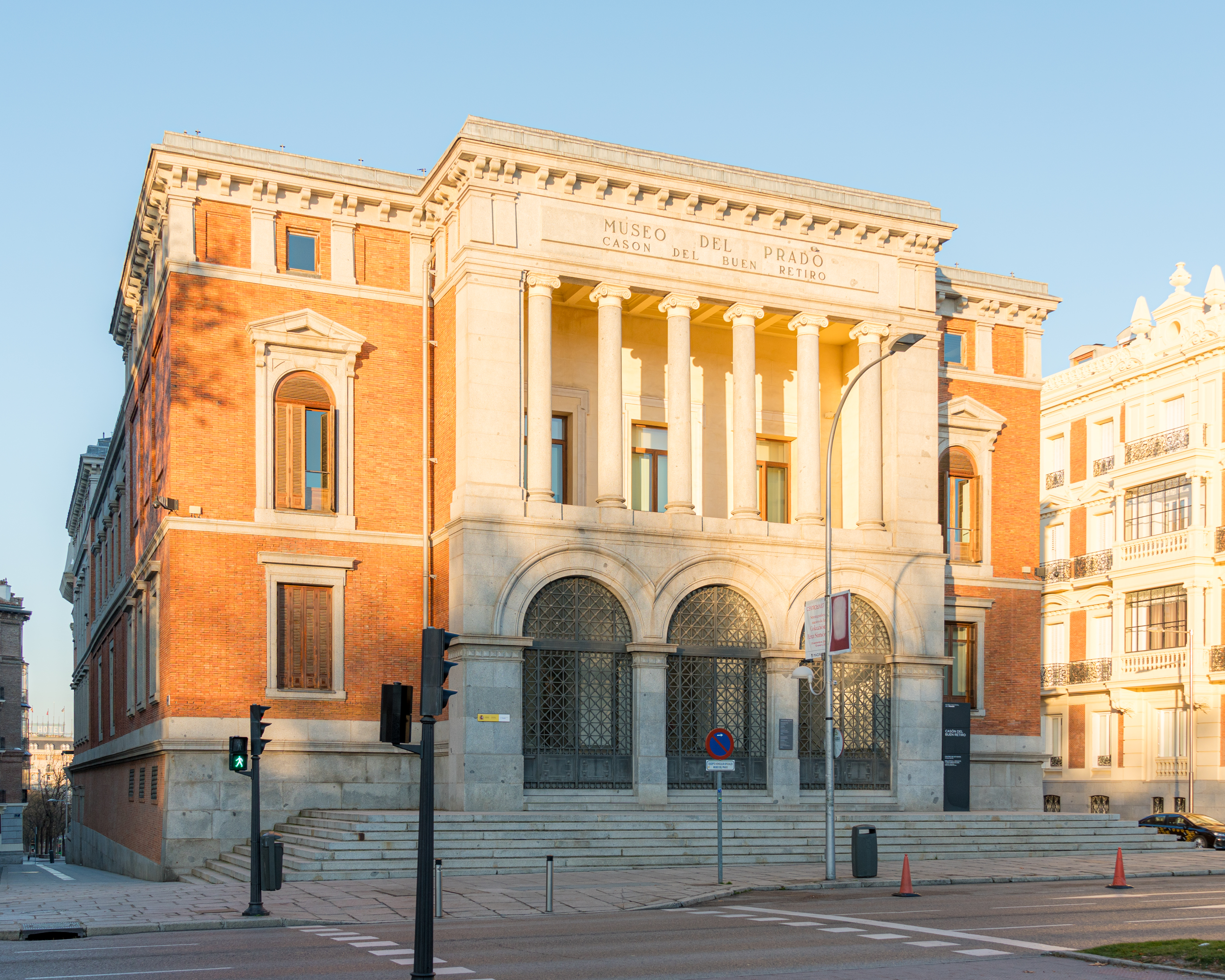
- East façade
- Interactive map of the Casón del Buen Retiro area

General information
- Architectural style: Baroque
- Location: Madrid, Spain, 28, Alfonso XII Street
- Coordinates: 40.41525°N 3.689569°W
- Completed: 1637
- Renovated: 19th Century
- Management: Museo del Prado

Design and construction
- Architect: Alonso Carbonel

Renovating team
- Architects: Mariano Carderera, Ricardo Velázquez Bosco

Website
- museodelprado.es

UNESCO World Heritage Site
- Criteria: Cultural: (ii), (iv), (vi)
- Designated: 2021 (44th session)
- Part of: Paseo del Prado and Buen Retiro, a Landscape of Arts and Sciences
- Reference no.: 1618

The Casón del Buen Retiro is an annex of the Museo del Prado complex in Madrid. Following major restoration work, which was completed in October 2007, it now houses the museum's study centre (the Escuela del Prado) and library.

Picasso's 1937 Guernica canvas, and the sketches associated with its creation, were displayed at the Casón from 1981, when it was delivered to Spain from New York's Museum of Modern Art (MoMA), to 1992, when it was moved to its current permanent location in a purpose-built gallery at the Museo Nacional Centro de Arte Reina Sofía.

== History ==
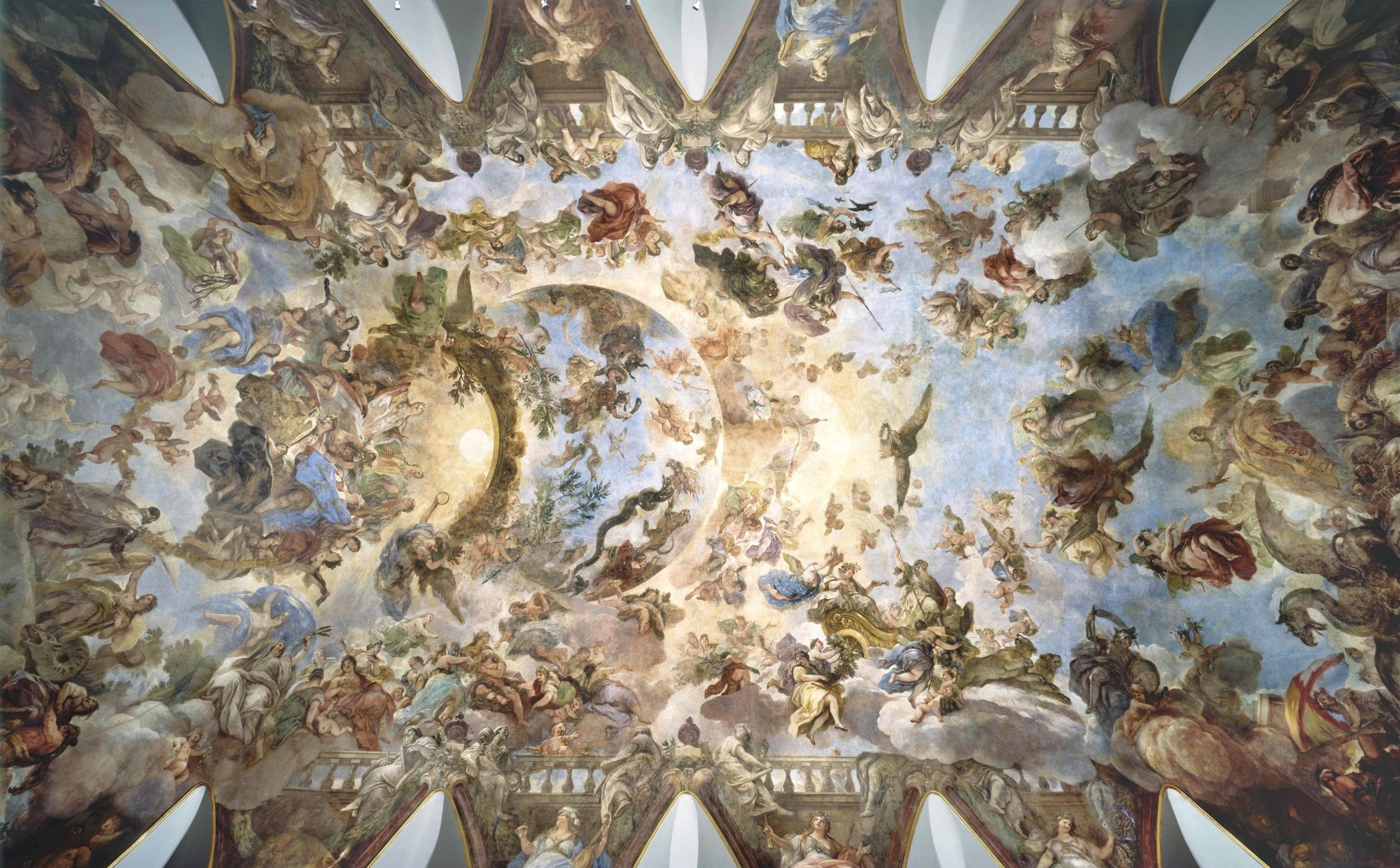
The Allegory of the Golden Fleece, c. 1694 by Luca Giordano.

The Casón del Buen Retiro was originally built as the ballroom in the 17th century, the Salón de Baile, of the Buen Retiro Palace, of which now only two buildings, the Casón and the Salón de Reinos still remain. The Casón is located in front of the Puerta de Felipe IV entrance on the west side of Retiro Park.

The artistic importance of Luca Giordano's The Allegory of the Golden Fleece, a c. 1694 fresco on the ceiling of the Casón commissioned by King Charles II of Spain, is one of the possible reasons given for the building having survived when most of the other Bueno Retiro palace complex buildings were demolished in the 19th century. The fresco is considered one of the masterpieces of the Prado's collection.

=== Museums ===
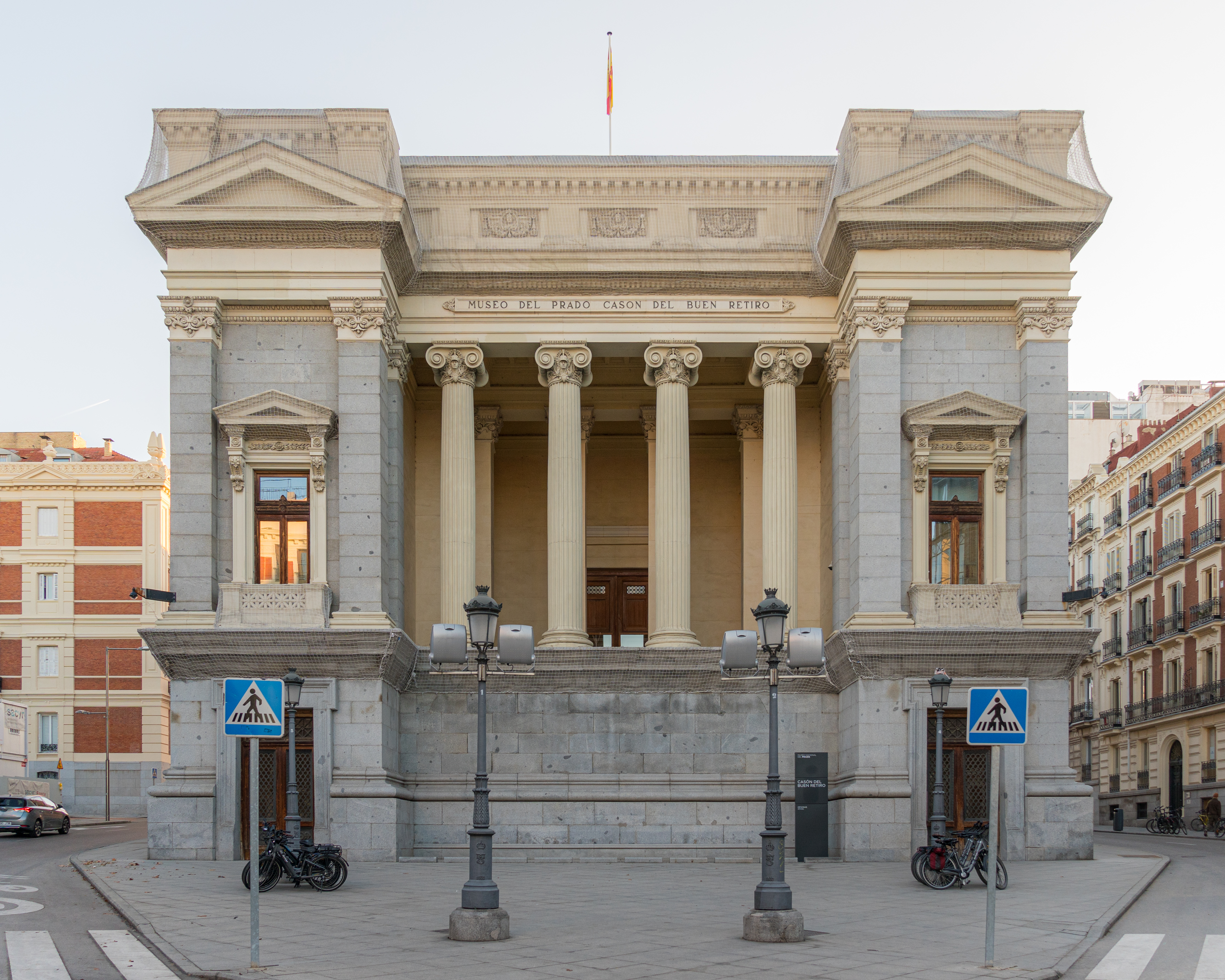
The west façade

From 1877 to 1960 the Casón was used as the Museo de Reproducciones Artísticas, set up by the then President of the Government, Antonio Canovas del Castillo, until it was moved to the Museo de América. The building was then used as a temporary exhibition space until 1971. From 1971 to 1981 it was used by the Museo del Prado for the 19th-century collections paintings and sculptures which had formerly been in the Museo de Arte Moderno. From 1981 to 1992 the Casón housed Picasso’s Guernica painting, now in the Museo Reina Sofía.

== Library ==
The library of the Museo del Prado, on the ground floor of the Casón building, consists of the Reading Room for the use of researchers, the museum's technical staff and students of the Escuela del Prado, and the book stores located in the basements. It comprises some 70,000 books, including those acquired from two private collections, those of José María Cervelló and of the Daza-Madrazo family, the latter mostly books belonging to the painter José de Madrazo, director of the Museo del Prado from 1838 to 1851.

== Escuela del Prado ==
The Escuela del Prado is a school of the Museo del Prado housed in the Casón building.

=== Restoration work ===
From 1997 to 2007, the Casón building was closed for remodelling and enlargement. Projects included the excavation of two new floors, resulting in almost double the preexisting space.
