= José Leonardo =

Spanish painter

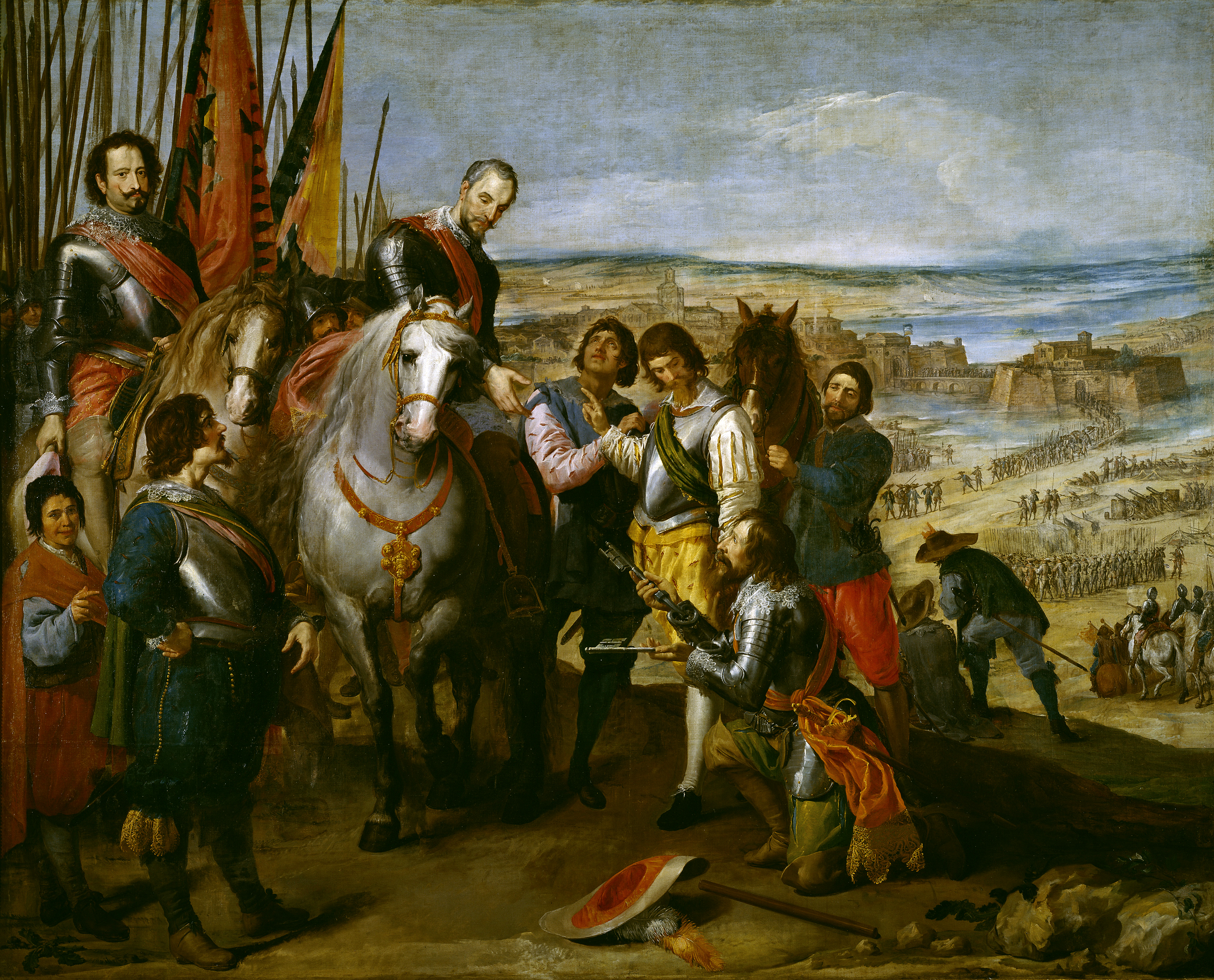
José Leonardo, The Surrender of Juliers, Museo del Prado, Madrid, 1636

José Leonardo, known also as Jusepe Leonardo (1601–1652), was a Spanish painter of the Baroque period, active during his maturity in the royal court in Madrid.

== Biography ==
Leonardo was born at Calatayud in the Province of Zaragoza, and was a pupil of Eugenio Caxés. He trained with Pedro de las Cuevas, and became known for his battle paintings. He was painter to the king, and executed for the palace of Buen Retiro works worthy of celebrity; among them the Surrender of Juliers and the March of the Duke of Feria's Troop upon Acqui. There is also a portrait of Alaric the Goth in the Royal collections. His The Brazen Serpent is still in Madrid.

Leonardo was one of the artists used to decorate the Royal Alcazar of Madrid, restored by King Philip IV of Spain. Félix Castello and Leonardo painted the vaults of the Sacristy of the Royal Chapel. He was unable to finish the Reliquary in the same chapel and, in 1648, another painter was contracted. He apparently became an alcoholic, demented, and died at Zaragoza. His enemies were accused of having poisoned him.
