= Buen Retiro Palace =

Palace in Madrid, Spain

Coordinates: 40°24′49.23″N 3°40′54.08″W

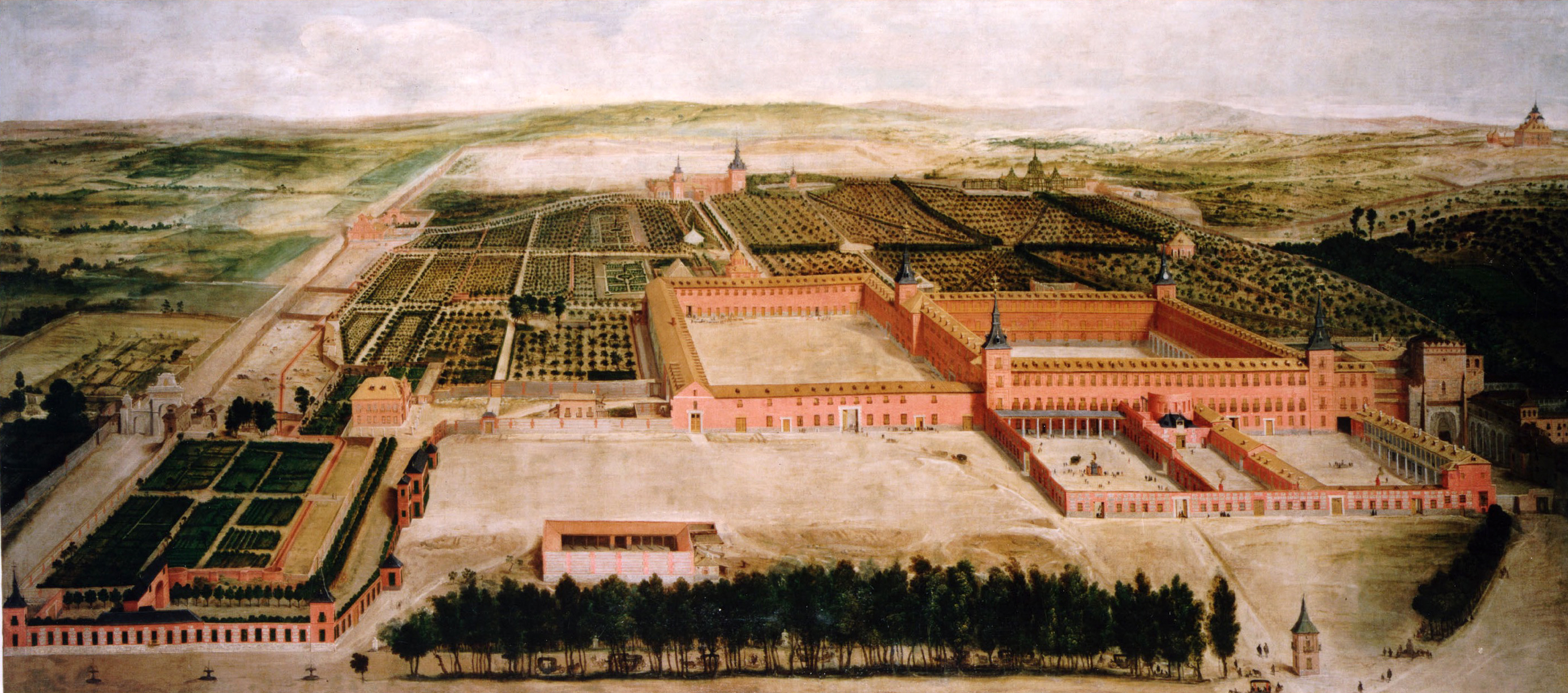
Buen Retiro Palace in 1637 — painting attributed to Jusepe Leonardo

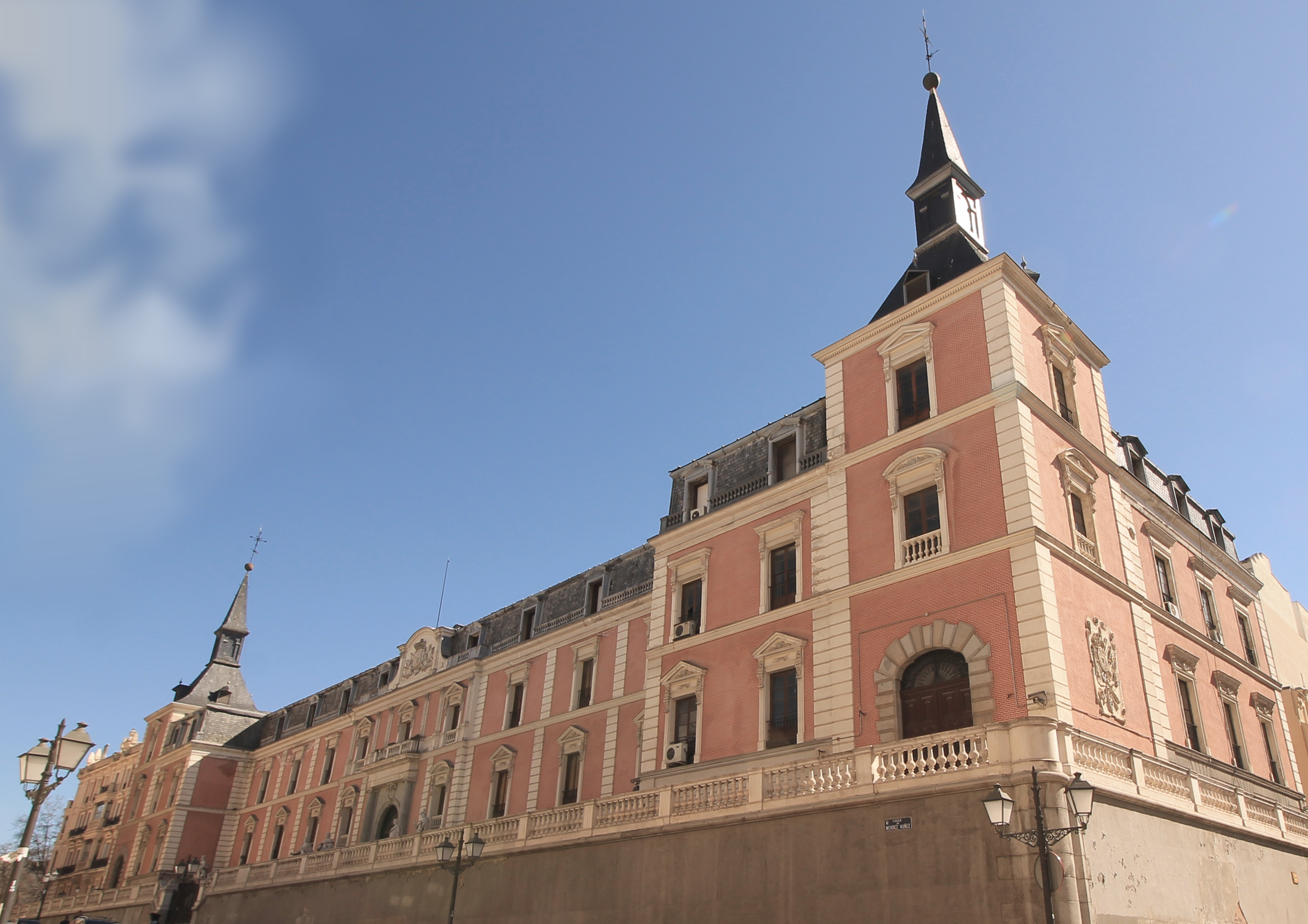
Exterior of the Salón de Reinos

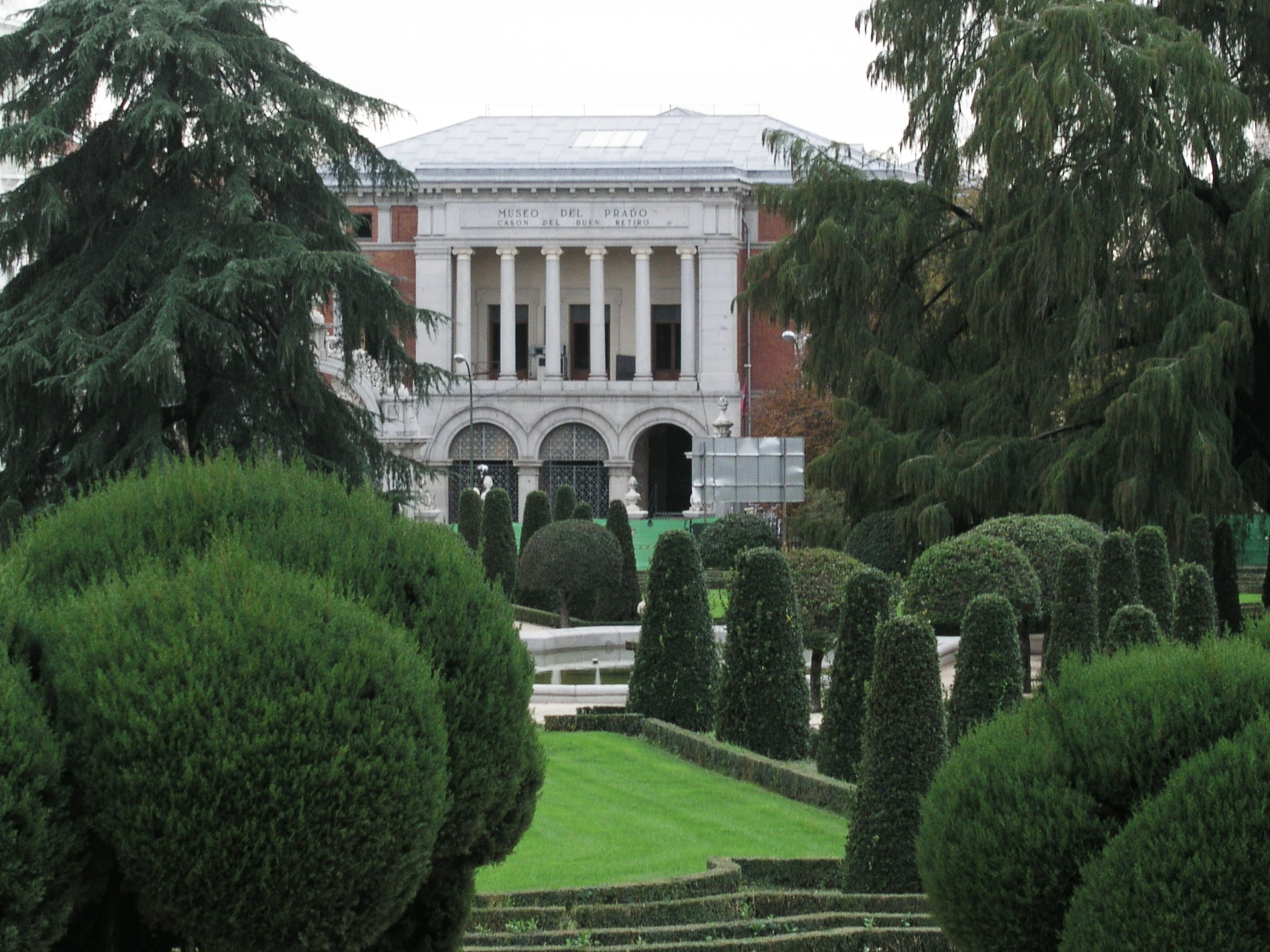
Casón del Buen Retiro

Buen Retiro Palace (Spanish: Palacio del Buen Retiro) in Madrid was a large palace complex designed by the architect Alonso Carbonell (c. 1590–1660) and built on the orders of Philip IV of Spain as a secondary residence and place of recreation (hence its name). It was built in what was then the eastern limits of the city of Madrid. Today, what little remains of its buildings and gardens forms the Retiro Park.

== History ==
Philip IV used to stay occasionally in some rooms annexed to the monastery of San Jerónimo el Real (close to the current location of the Prado Museum, which received the name of the Royal Quarters. The reason for these frequent visits could be that the so-called Planet King particularly enjoyed walking in the attached farm, property of the Count-Duke of Olivares, his royal favourite and minister.

Olivares, with the intention of pleasing the monarch, planned in 1629 and started in 1630 the construction of a series of offices and pavilions as an extension of the Royal Quarters, which ended up forming the Buen Retiro Palace. The building of the palace was not something planned from the start, but occurred over a period of seven years (until 1640 during which further additions were built successively). Once finished, the palace consisted of more than 20 buildings and two large open squares used for court entertainments and various other acts. The palace complex was surrounded by a large expanse of gardens and ponds, giving it a playful character.

The king only used to spend a few days per year, usually in the summer, in his second home, but a large campaign was still carried out to provide the palace with an artistic ornamental level that would match that of the Royal Alcazar of Madrid, his main residence. The lack of antique paintings in the market led to the commission of a series of paintings from Rome and Naples, which required the management of ambassadors and others of Philip IV's workers. Several of these pictures remain in the Prado Museum; some highlights are the landscapes of Claude Lorrain, Nicolas Poussin and Gaspard Dughet, Biblical and mythological scenes by Massimo Stanzione and several paintings of ancient Rome by Giovanni Lanfranco, among other artists.

For the Salón de Reinos (royal reception room; until recently the Army Museum) a commemorative series of Spanish military triumphs was commissioned, including Diego Velázquez' famous painting The Surrender of Breda. Other paintings of the series are due to Francisco Zurbarán, Antonio de Pereda, Juan Bautista Maíno and Vicente Carducho.

The palace remained a royal residence until the late 18th century. After the fire of the Royal Alcazar of Madrid in December 1734, the Buen Retiro Palace became the main seat of the royal court until the construction of the new Royal Palace of Madrid, which was finished in 1764.

Due to its hasty design and construction, the building of the palace was low-quality, including the materials used, and this was the cause of its end. During the Peninsular War, in 1808 French troops stationed in Madrid used the palace and its annexes as barracks. Powder kegs were stored in the gardens and a bunker was built for them, causing irreparable damage to the area. Furthermore, the buildings were seriously damaged, so much so that when Isabella II tried to begin its restoration, it was decided that nothing could be done but to demolish it almost completely.

== Today ==
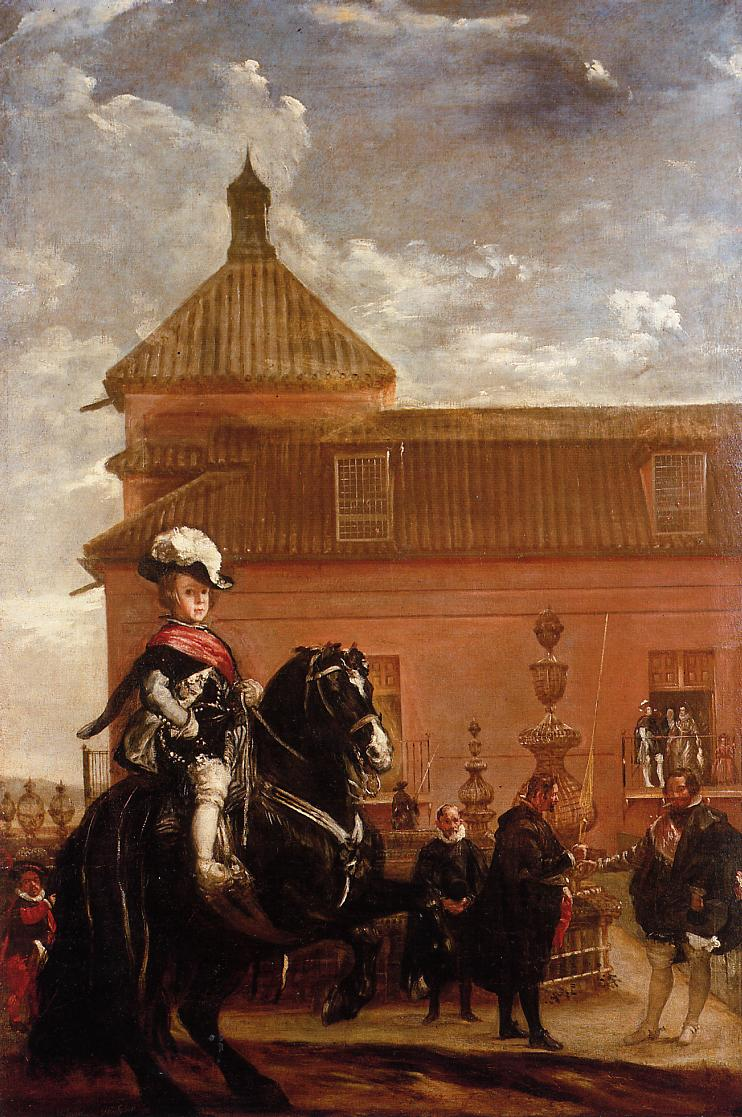
Prince Baltasar Carlos with the Count-Duke of Olivares outside the Buen Retiro Palace, by Diego Velázquez, 1636

The main remaining trace of the Palace complex is the gardens of Retiro Park, although these have no resemblance to the original design of the gardens, and encompass only half the original extent. Two other buildings remain, much altered from their original exteriors, both now destined to become part of the Prado Museum complex:

- The Hall of Realms or Salón de Reinos, originally the royal reception room with throne, was outfitted with paintings glorifying the generals under the Duke of Olivares. Later it became part of the museum complex surrounding the Prado. For decades in the 20th century it housed the army museum or Museo del Ejército until it moved to the Alcázar de Toledo in 2010–12.
- The Salón de Baile (originally the ballroom), now known as the Casón del Buen Retiro, once housing the 19th-century Prado collections, now hosts the Study Center of the Prado Museum. The ceiling of the main room is decorated by a magnificent fresco by the Italian artist Luca Giordano, painted around 1696–1697 for King Charles II of Spain and depicting The Apotheosis of the Spanish Monarchy.

== See also ==
- List of missing landmarks in Spain
