= Cavillargues medallion =

Roman Empire artefact

Cavillargues medallion Nîmes medallion
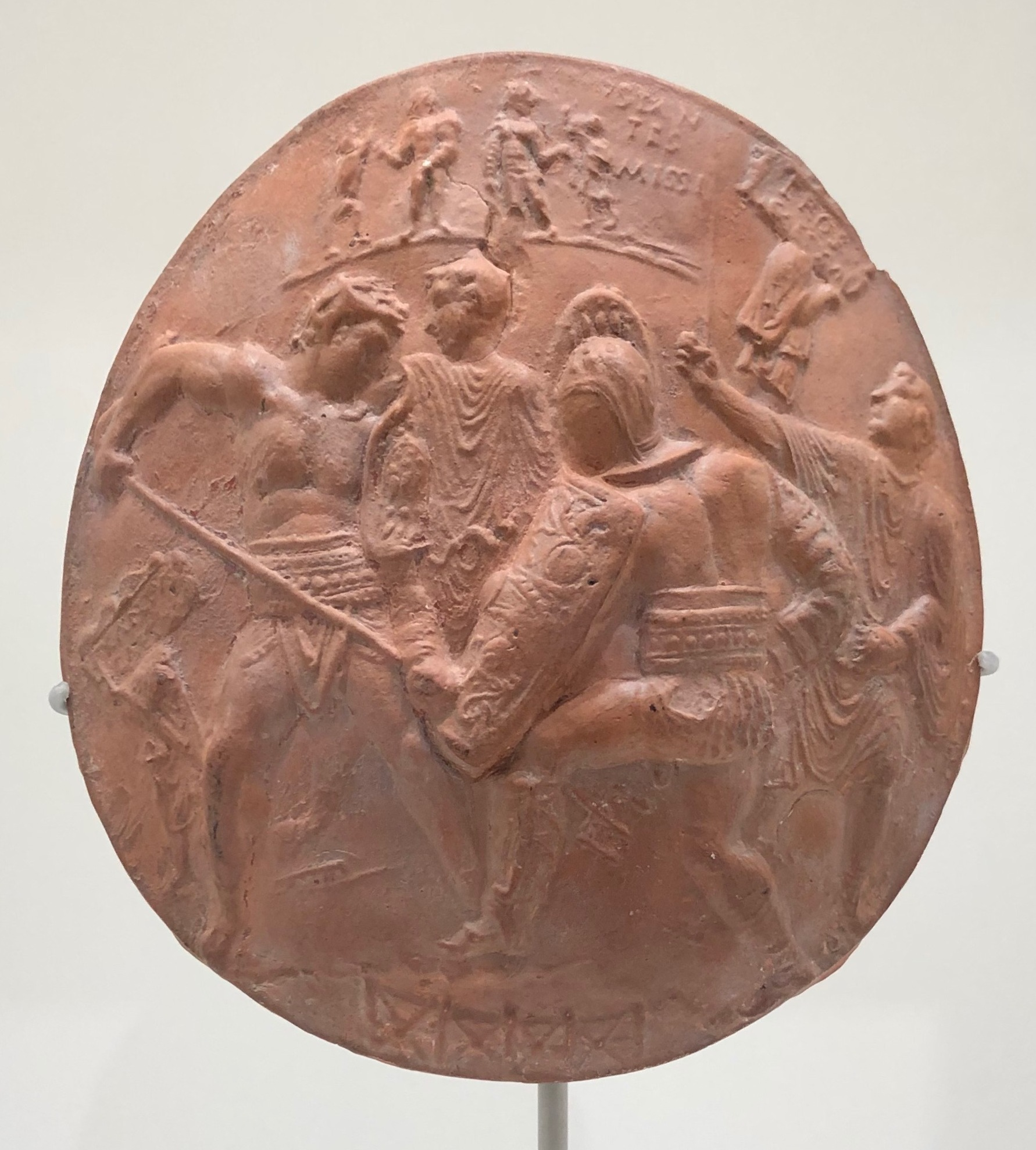
- Obverse of the medallion
- Type: Medallion
- Material: Terracotta
- Width: 16 centimetres (6.3 in)
- Created: Late 2nd–early 3rd century CE
- Discovered: Cavillargues, France; 44°06′54″N 4°31′22″E
- Present location: Musée de la Romanité, Nîmes
- Identification: GD 188
- Culture: Ancient Roman

The Cavillargues medallion (also called the Nîmes medallion) is a Roman Imperial terracotta relief medallion of the 2nd or 3rd century, 16 centimetres (6.3 in) across, found at Cavillargues in southern France. It depicts a gladiatorial combat between a retiarius and a secutor. The medallion has been studied by American historian Anthony Corbeill and he believes it shows a games official signalling pollicēs premere, the granting of mercy to fighters whose combat ends in a draw.

== Description ==
The medallion is made of terracotta and measures 16 centimetres (6.3 in) in diameter. Originally intended as a decorative attachment for the front of a vase, it was found reused as a cover on a cremation urn in Cavillargues, in the Gard department of southern France, sometime in the first half of the 19th century. It is now part of the collection of the Musée de la Romanité in Nîmes.

The medallion is dated by subject matter and style and to the period of the Roman empire, probably the late second or early third century. The foreground depicts, at the left, a lightly armed retiarius, equipped with a net and trident, fighting a more heavily armed and armoured secutor at the right. Inscriptions carried on placards by small figures at the lower left and upper right identify the retiarius as Xantus, winner of 15 competitions, and the secutor as Eros, winner of 16 competitions. Behind and between the fighters stands an arena official; to the right is another official making a hand gesture. At the top of the medallion, in the background, are four figures accompanied by the inscription STANTES MISSI ("released [while still] standing"). At the bottom of the medallion is a representation of the barricade that separated the arena from the audience. The medallion depicts no crowd, but places the viewer within the front row of the audience, amongst the most elite of spectators.

== Interpretation ==
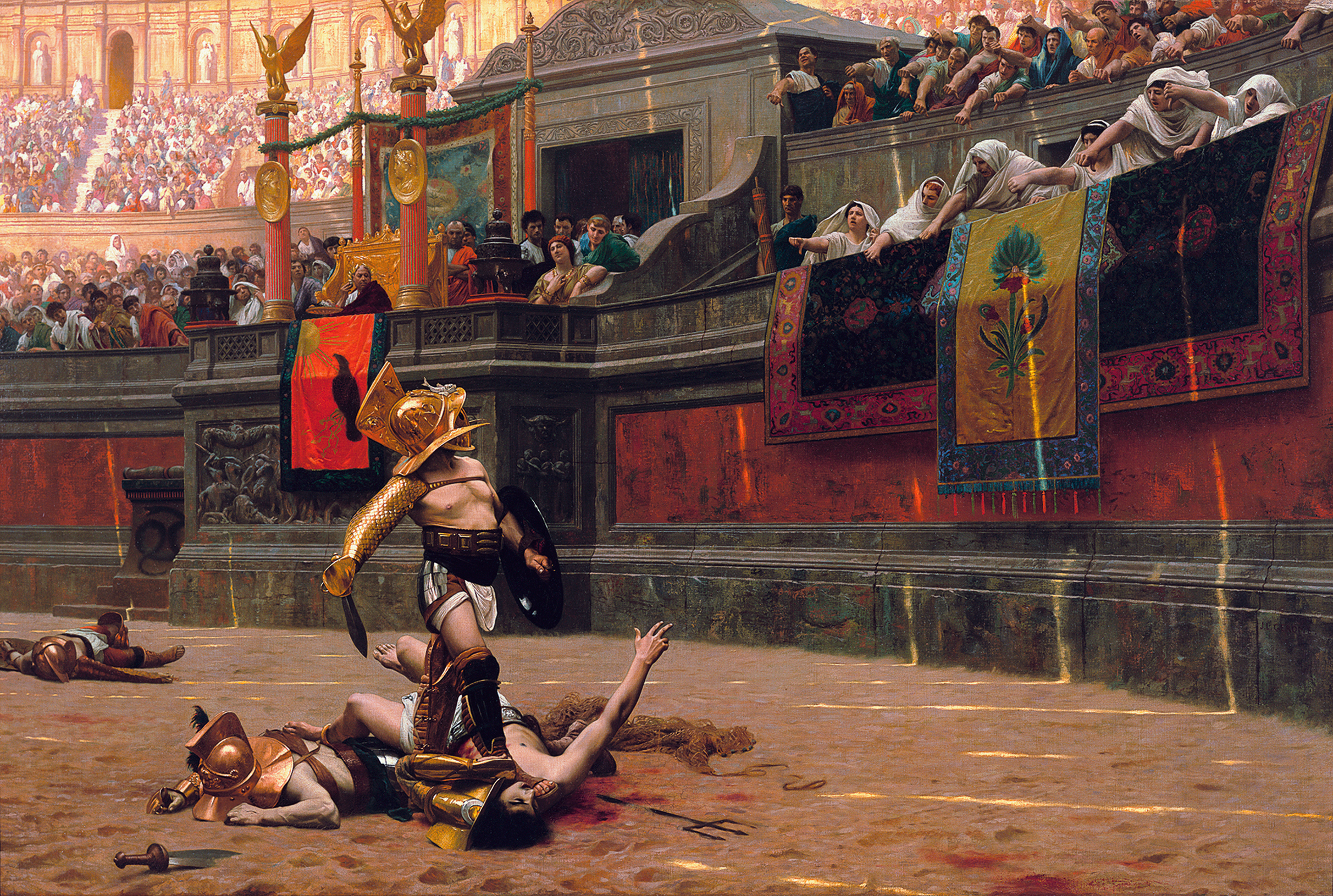
Pollice Verso (1872) by Gérôme

The medallion has been studied by American historian Anthony Corbeill, who has a particular interest in the Roman gestures, including those associated with gladiatorial combats. Corbeill notes there are a number of published interpretations of the medallion. These centre on the interpretation of the granting of the stantēs missī, a ruling that a fight was drawn and both gladiators granted mercy. Such rulings are known to have occurred in the Roman era and are mentioned, for example, in poetry by Martial.

The first interpretation is that "stantēs missī!" is a shout from the audience for the fight in the foreground to be declared over. Another is that the text relates to the figures in the background who are gladiators already reprieved by this means. The third interpretation, and the one that Corbeill favours, is that the background is a separate scene to the foreground and shows the future with the two fighters being reprieved. Corbeill notes that the two central background figures are wearing armour similar to those in the foreground. The two outer figures are depicted as being small, possibly to indicate their lower status. Corbeill proposes that these men are attendants to the gladiators and are removing their arms or presenting honours such as a garland or palm. He notes that a depiction of the past and future in the same piece is also seen in contemporary mosaics.

Corbeill has written on the role of gesture in Roman society and believes the medallion shows the pollices premere, the hand signal that mercy was to be granted. Corbeill believes the figure at the right of the medallion to be an official signalling the pollices premere. This signal is stated by Corbeill to have been a clenched fist with the thumb atop and wrapped around. The pollices premere was contrasted with the pollice verso, a thumbs up signal that indicated that a fighter was to be killed. Corbeill holds that the figure between the two fighters is an umpire and that he looks for the signal to end the fight, given by a person positioned off the scene to the left.

Corbeill considers that the medallion shows that officials (specifically the games' producer, the ēditor) made the decision on whether to grant mercy not the victorious gladiator who seeks approval from the crowd, as is often depicted in popular culture such as the late 19th-century Jean-Léon Gérôme painting Pollice Verso.

French historian Héron de Villefosse considered the vertical line at the right of the medallion to be a baton held by the official on the right. Such batons are known from other Roman depictions of gladiatorial combats and were used by officials to separate the fighters. Corbeill considers that the line, if it depicts a baton, cannot be associated with the right hand figure as his hand is incorrectly positioned to hold it. Corbeill considers the line may serve to separate the background scene from the righthand placard holder, who is associated with the foreground scene, or is a baton held by the official in the centre of the scene. Corbeill favours the latter interpretation.

== Bibliography ==
- Cook, Theodore Andrea (2001). Old Provence. Signal Books. ISBN 978-1-902669-18-2.
- Corbeill, Anthony (1997). "Thumbs in Ancient Rome: "Pollex" as Index". Memoirs of the American Academy in Rome. 42: 1–21. doi:10.2307/4238745. ISSN 0065-6801. JSTOR 4238745.
- Corbeill, Anthony (5 June 2018). Nature Embodied: Gesture in Ancient Rome. Princeton University Press. ISBN 978-0-691-18780-8.
- de Vic, C.; Vaissete, J. (1892). Histoire générale de Languedoc: avec des notes et les pièces justificatives (in French). Vol. 15. Édouard Privat.
- Pelet, Auguste (1850–1851). "Essai sur un bas-relief découvert en 1845, dans le territoire de Cavillargues près Bagnols (Gard)". Mémoires de l'Académie du Gard: 39–41.
