= Titucia gens =

Ancient Roman family

The gens Titucia, occasionally spelled Tituccia, was an obscure plebeian family at ancient Rome. Few members of this gens are mentioned in history, of whom the most illustrious was Titucius Roburrus, praefectus urbi in AD 283. Others are known from inscriptions.

== Origin ==
Most of the inscriptions of the Titucii are from Sabinum and adjoining regions of Samnium, indicating that the Titucii were probably Sabines, Samnites, or belonged to some other Oscan-speaking people of central Italy. The nomen Titucius is presumably derived from the cognomen Titucus, found in an inscription of the Flavia gens.

== Praenomina ==
The praenomina known from the epigraphy of the Titucii are Titus, Gaius, Marcus, Quintus, and Manius. All of these were common throughout Roman history, although Manius, found in a filiation of this gens, was more distinctive than the others—perhaps due to its association with the Manes, the spirits of the dead.

== Members ==
This list includes abbreviated praenomina. For an explanation of this practice, see filiation.

- Gaius Titucius T. f., one of the quattuorvirs of Alba Fucens in Sabinum, where his ashes were deposited in a first-century cinerarium.
- Titus Titucius, named in a first-century inscription from Marruvium in Sabinum.
- Titus Titucius Florianus, together with Teia Galla, perhaps his wife, dedicated a first-century monument at Venafrum in Samnium for Narcissus, a slave and vilicus, or steward, aged twenty-five.
- Titucia Grata, buried in a first-century tomb at Marruvium.
- Titus Titucius Ɔ. l. Sota, a freedman buried in a first-century tomb at Lucus Angitiae in Sabinum.
- Titucia M'. f., buried at Alba Fucens, in a tomb dating from the latter half of the first century.
- Marcus Tituccius Daphnus, dedicated a second-century tomb at Rome for two slave-children of his household: Lucana, aged nine years, three months, thirteen days, and four hours, and her brother, Macedo, aged five years, two months, one day, and three hours.
- Titucia Q. l. Felicula, a freedwoman buried at Astigi in Hispania Baetica, aged fifty, in a tomb dating from the latter half of the second century.
- Titucius Roburrus, (Note: Perhaps his surname should be "Reburrus".) praefectus urbi in AD 283, according to the Chronography of 354.

=== Undated Titucii ===
- Marcus Tituccius Saturninus, a member of the collegio tibicinum, or flute-players' guild, at Rome.
- Quintus Titucius Silvinus, buried at the site of modern Cavillargues, formerly part of Aquitania.

== See also ==
- List of Roman gentes

== Bibliography ==
- Chronography of 354.
- Theodor Mommsen et alii, Corpus Inscriptionum Latinarum (The Body of Latin Inscriptions, abbreviated CIL), Berlin-Brandenburgische Akademie der Wissenschaften (1853–present).
- George Davis Chase, "The Origin of Roman Praenomina", in Harvard Studies in Classical Philology, vol. VIII, pp. 103–184 (1897).
- Paul von Rohden, Elimar Klebs, & Hermann Dessau, Prosopographia Imperii Romani (The Prosopography of the Roman Empire, abbreviated PIR), Berlin (1898).
