= Thumb signal =

Hand gesture indicating approval or disapproval

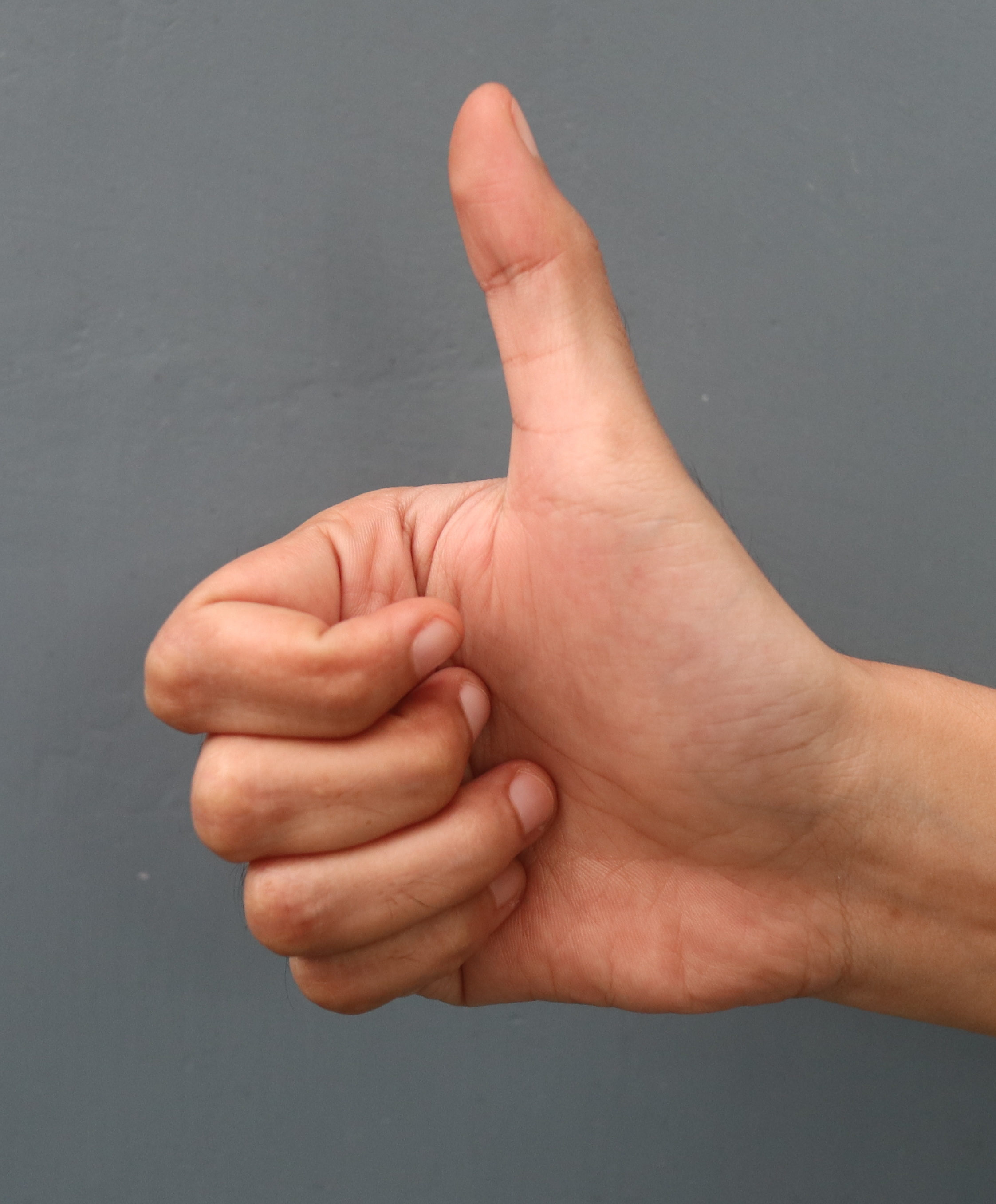
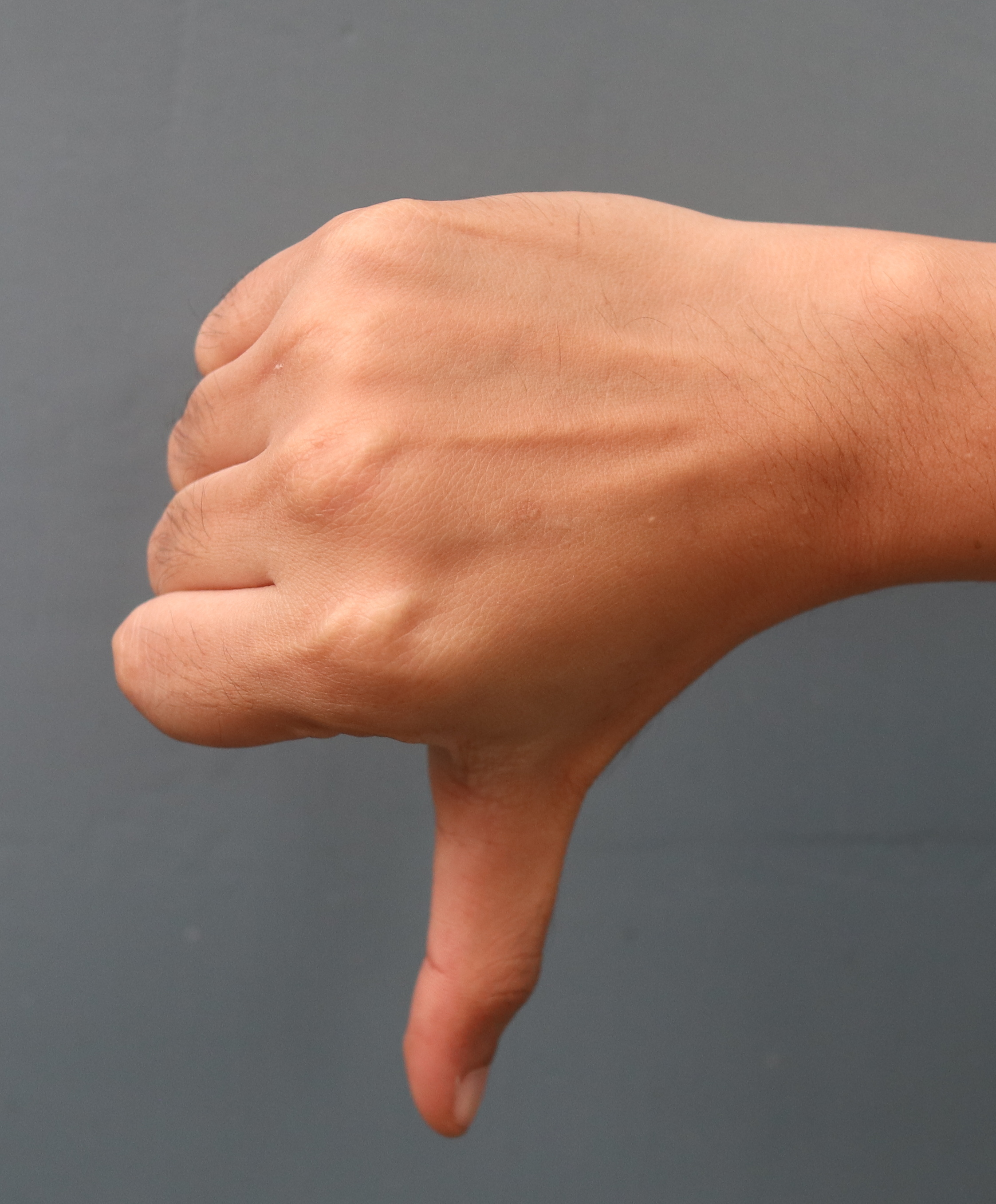
A thumbs-up and a thumbs-down

A thumb signal, usually described as a thumbs-up or thumbs-down, is a common hand gesture achieved by a closed fist held with the thumb extended upward or downward, respectively. The thumbs-up gesture is associated with positivity, approval, achievement, satisfaction and solidarity, while the thumbs-down gesture is associated with concern, disapproval, dissatisfaction, rejection and failure.

== History ==
=== Ancient Rome ===
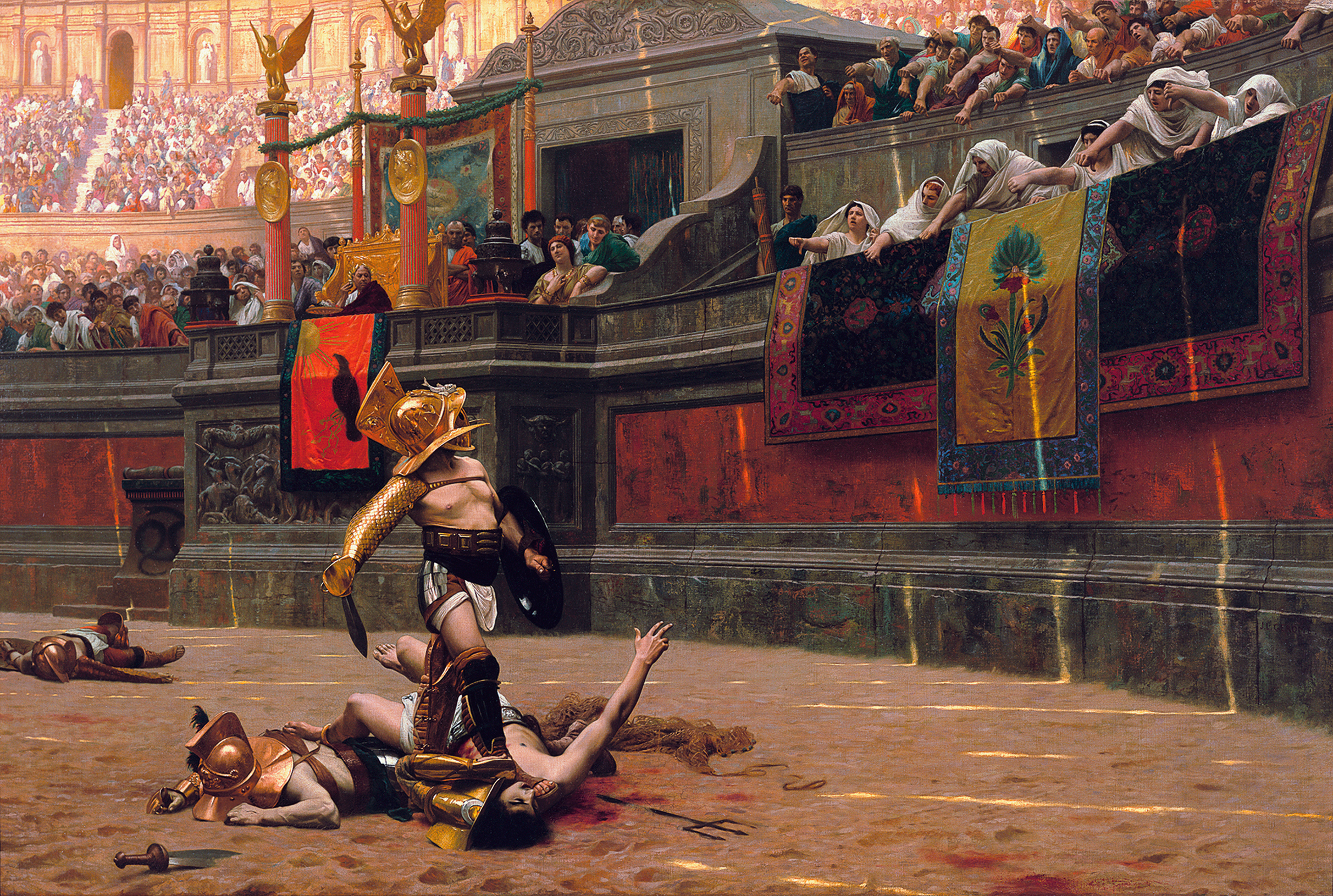
Pollice Verso (1872) by Jean-Léon Gérôme is one of the sources of the "thumbs down" gesture in modern popular culture, but is not based on historical data from Ancient Rome.

The Latin phrase pollice verso is used in the context of gladiatorial combat for a hand gesture used by Ancient Roman crowds to pass judgment on a defeated gladiator.

Now they give shows of their own. Thumbs up! Thumbs down! And the killers, spare or slay, and then go back to concessions for private privies.

— Juvenal, Against the City of Rome (c. 110–127 A.D.)

While it is clear that the thumb was involved, the precise type of gesture described by the phrase pollice verso and its meaning are unclear in the historical and literary record. According to Anthony Corbeill, a classical studies professor who has extensively researched the practice, thumbs up signalled killing the gladiator while "a closed fist with a wraparound thumb" meant sparing him. In modern popular culture it is wrongly presumed that "thumbs down" was the signal that a defeated gladiator should be condemned to death; "thumbs up", that he should be spared.

=== Middle Ages ===
It has been suggested that 'thumbs up' was a signal from English archers preparing for battle that all is well with their bow and they are ready to fight. Before use, the fistmele (or the "brace height") was checked, that being the distance between the string and the bow on an English longbow. This fistmele should be about 7 inches (18 cm), which is about the same as a fist with a thumb extended. The term fistmele is a Saxon word that refers to that measurement.

Desmond Morris in Gestures: Their Origins and Distribution traces the practice back to a medieval custom used to seal business transactions, suggesting that over time, the mere sight of an upraised thumb came to symbolize harmony and kind feelings. For example, see the seventeenth-century Diego Velázquez painting The Lunch.

=== 20th century ===
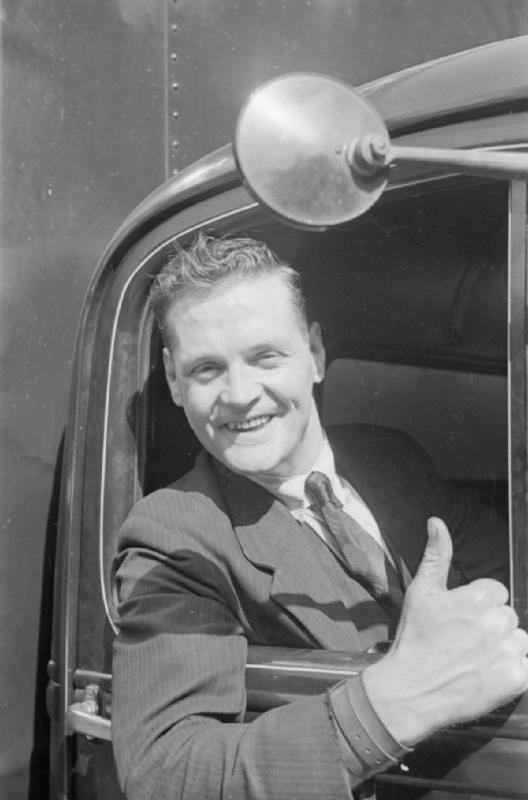
A truck driver giving a thumb sign in Britain, 1940

The Oxford English Dictionary cites the earliest written instance of "thumbs-up" (with a positive meaning) as being from Over the Top, a 1917 book written by Arthur Guy Empey. Empey was an American who served in the British armed forces during World War I. He wrote: "Thumbs up, Tommy’s expression which means ‘everything is fine with me'." A visual example of the British use of "thumbs up" having a positive meaning (or, "okay") from the 1920s can be seen 19 minutes into the British-made silent 1927 film The Lodger: A Story of the London Fog, where the younger man examines some paper money for the older man and declares it "good" (not counterfeit) with a "thumbs up" using both hands.

Popularization in the United States is generally attributed to the practices of World War II pilots, who used the thumbs up to communicate with ground crews before take-off. This custom may have originated with the China-based Flying Tigers, who were among the first American flyers involved in World War II. The appreciative Chinese would say ting hao de (挺好的) meaning "very good", and gesture with a thumbs up, which in Chinese means "you're number one". High officials in the Chinese government see it as a sign of respect.

During World War II, pilots on US aircraft carriers adopted the thumbs-up gesture to alert the deck crew that they were ready to go and that the wheel chocks could be removed. On modern US carriers, specific deck crew hold a thumb up to signal to the pilot and control tower that their station is OK for take-off. American GIs are reputed to have picked up on the thumb gesture and spread it throughout Europe as they marched toward Berlin. According to Luís da Câmara Cascudo, Brazilians adopted the thumbs up from watching American pilots based in northern Brazil during World War II.

=== 21st century ===
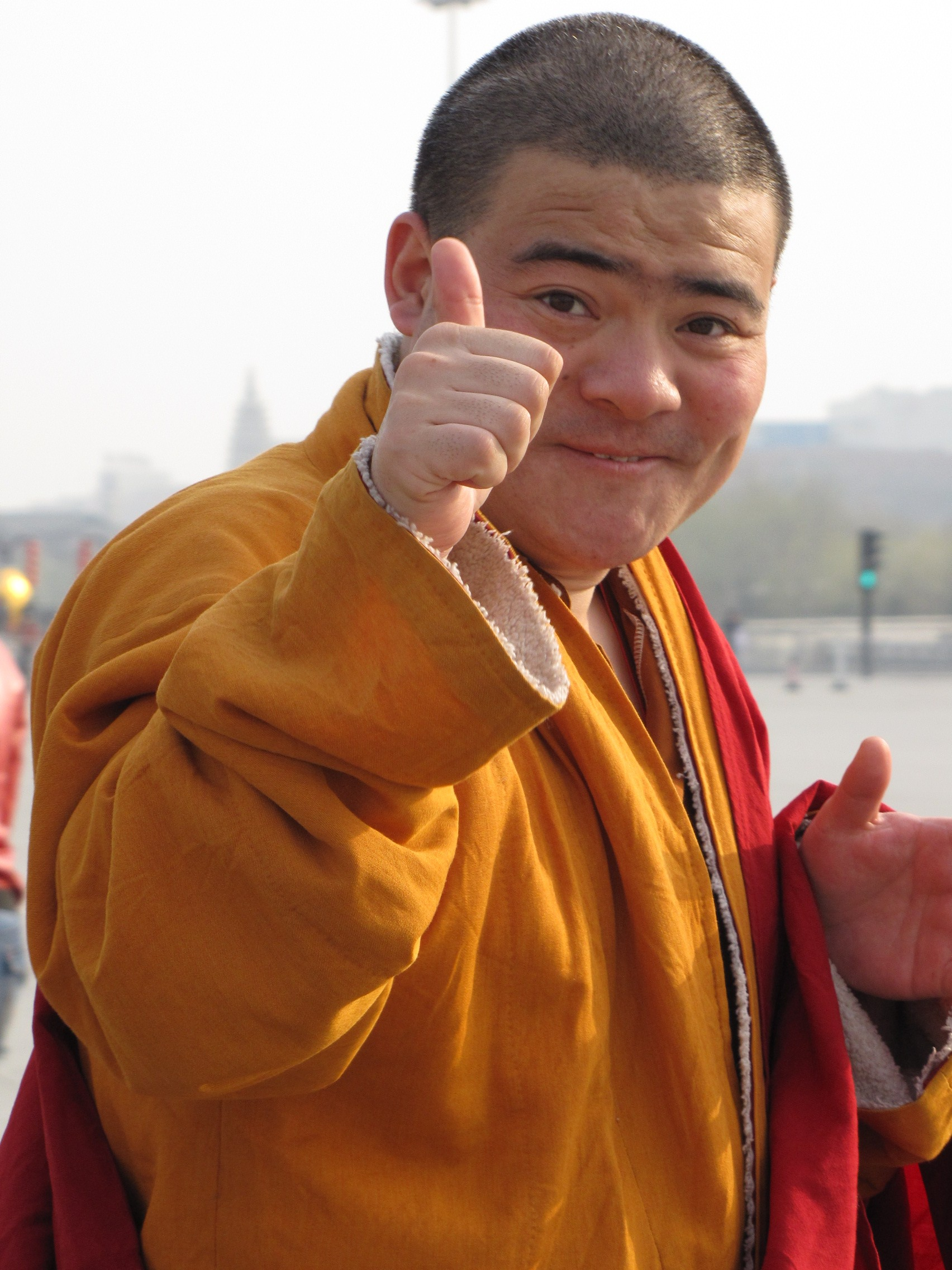
A Buddhist monk giving the common thumb sign of approval

On July 28, 2017, when Senator John McCain of Arizona cast the deciding vote that derailed a Republican repeal attempt of the Affordable Care Act ("Obamacare"), he used the thumbs down gesture. On March 5, 2021 Kyrsten Sinema used the thumbs down gesture while voting against an amendment which would have increased the federal minimal wage to $15 by 2025 during a vote on a Covid-19 relief package.

In 2023, a farmer in Canada was fined $82,000 CAD (around $64,500 in 2025 USD), having used a thumbs-up emoji in response to a text message contract, which was ruled as a binding agreement. The farmer failed to fulfill the contract by not delivering the expected amount of flax, leading to the penalty. The judge considered the emoji's meaning of assent or approval, concluding that it can serve as a digital signature. The ruling recognized the use of non-traditional methods, like emojis, in confirming contracts in today's technological landscape.

== Cultural meanings ==
The thumbs-up signal has a generally positive connotation in English-speaking countries. However, its perceived meaning varies significantly from culture to culture.

In Tibet, the thumbs-up gesture is a traditional way of begging for mercy.

The gesture is an insult in Iran, where it means "sit on this!"

In Germany, France and Hungary the gesture can simply indicate the number one, in the right context.

The thumbs-up gesture is used on the logo of Thums Up, a popular brand of cola from India. Starting in 2007, the thumbs-up also appeared on India's one-rupee coin.

== Context-specific usage ==
=== Film reviews ===
More recently, these gestures are associated with film reviews, having been popularized by critics Gene Siskel and Roger Ebert on their televised review show Siskel & Ebert; the thumb up meaning a positive opinion of a film; the thumb down meaning a negative one. The trademarked phrase "two thumbs up", originally meaning a positive review from both reviewers, has come to be used as an indication of very high quality or unanimity of praise.

=== Social media ===
The Facebook like button

By extension from the film review usage, many websites (including Facebook) allow users to approve or disapprove of items, such as comments in a forum, products in a store, or even other people's reviews of movies, books, products, etc., by choosing to click either a thumbs-up or thumbs-down button. In the aggregate, this serves as an evaluation system. Other users may then see the total number of thumbs up and thumbs down given to an item or the number produced by subtracting thumbs down from thumbs up. In the latter case, an item that received exactly ten of each would read as having a rating of zero, rather than one of +10/-10. Often, users may view a list of items in order of popularity, as ranked by this metric.

On the social media site Facebook, the thumbs-up gesture is shown as an icon and is associated with the term "like"—which within that context means to follow or subscribe to the page, posts, or profile of another individual or company. On YouTube, individual videos may be voted on positively or negatively by clicking the thumbs-up or thumbs-down icons respectively (which in some previous versions of the site, used to be accompanied by "Like" and "Dislike" labels, and are still referred as such nowadays), and in the case of a thumbs-up, the video gets added to the user's "Liked videos" playlist.

=== Hitchhiking ===
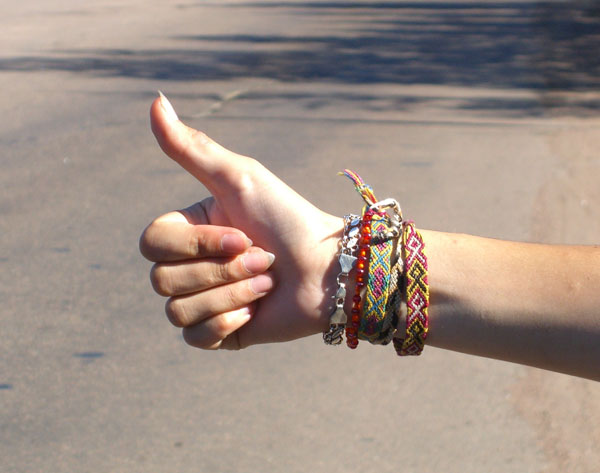
A typical hitchhiker's thumb gesture

Hitchhikers in the West traditionally use a thumb gesture to solicit rides from oncoming vehicles. However, in this presentation, the arm is generally outstretched with the palm and closed fingers facing the motorist. The gesture is usually performed with the hand nearest the motorist and points down the road, indicating the hopeful destination. A hitchhiker may wave their hand, emphasizing the directional meaning. This is similar to the "thumb towards the door" gesture, for "get out of here!"

=== Sports ===
In basketball, when a held ball occurs, an official will jerk both thumbs in the air, signalling that a jump ball is in order.

In baseball, umpires will sometimes jerk a thumbs-up over their shoulder as an "out" signal

Texas A&M University uses a thumbs-up as their Gig 'em hand signal, as it represents the action of gigging. The gesture and corresponding slogan "Gig 'em, Aggies!" were popularized in the early 20th century, becoming the first hand sign of the Southwest Conference.

In underwater diving signals, thumb up means "let's go up".

=== Safety ===
In scuba diving, the thumbs-up gesture is a specific diving signal given underwater, in which the diver indicates that he or she is about to stop his or her dive and ascend. This occasionally confuses new divers, who might automatically gesture thumbs-up when trying to indicate approval—actually indicating a desire to stop diving and to ascend. The diving signal for approval is the A-ok sign.

Amusement park rides such as roller coasters are usually cleared for departure using a thumbs-up signal from the workers after inspection that all safety precautions have been taken.

== Unicode ==
Unicode code points related to thumb signals include:

- U+1F44D 👍 THUMBS UP SIGN (glyph displayed as 👍︎ with variation selector-15, if supported by browser)
- U+1F44E 👎 THUMBS DOWN SIGN (glyph displayed as 👎︎ with variation selector-15, if supported by browser)
- U+1F592 🖒 REVERSED THUMBS UP SIGN
- U+1F593 🖓 REVERSED THUMBS DOWN SIGN
- U+1FAF9 🫹 Leftwards Thumb Sign
- U+1FAFA 🫺 Rightwards Thumb Sign

== Other encodings ==
Many keyboard emoticons utilize the shapes of lowercase "b" and "d" to represent a thumbs-up sign. Simple versions incorporate a dash for the wrist: -b or =b (right hand) and d- or d= (left hand). Many Japanese kaomoji icons place the thumbs beside a face constructed from punctuation marks, such as d(＾＾)ｂ or b(~_^)d. Various instant messaging services use (y) and (n) as a shortcut for thumbs up and thumbs down emoji.

== See also ==
- OK (gesture)
- Finger (gesture)
- Finger-counting, in which the thumb can indicate the number one.
- The finger
