= The Lunch (Velázquez) =

1617 painting by Spanish artist Diego Velázquez

- Tres hombres a la mesa (El almuerzo) (Spanish)
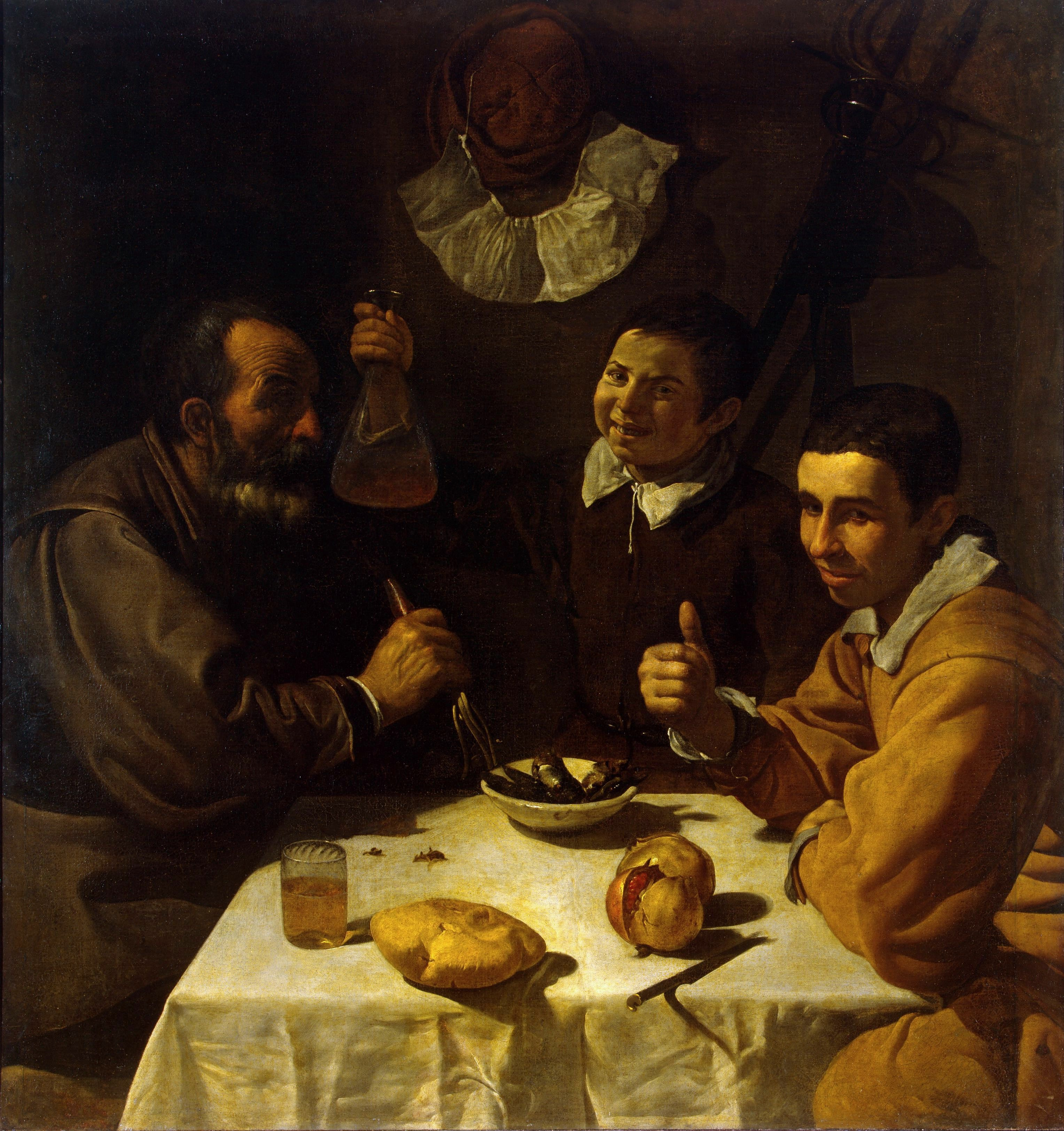
- Artist: Diego Velázquez
- Year: c. 1617
- Medium: Oil on canvas
- Dimensions: 108.5 cm × 102 cm (42.7 in × 40 in)
- Location: Hermitage Museum, Saint Petersburg

The Lunch is a very early painting by Spanish artist Diego Velázquez, finished c. 1617. The work, an oil painting on canvas, is in the Hermitage Museum of Saint Petersburg.

The painting portrays a table covered by a creased cloth, on which lie two pomegranates and a piece of bread. People attending the lunch include an aged man on the left and a young man on the right, while, in the background, an apparently carefree boy pours wine into a jug. The smiling man on the right appears to be giving the thumb signal.

On the wall in the background hang a white neck-band, a leather bag and, on the right, a sword.

The Lunch is nearly identical to another painting by Velázquez, The Farmers' Lunch (1618).

The painting was on public display as The Breakfast from February 2 to August 25, 2019 at the H'ART Museum in Amsterdam, the Netherlands, as part of the 'De Schatkamer!' exhibition.

== See also ==
- List of works by Diego Velázquez
