= Musée de la Romanité =

- Coordinates: 43.8339°N 4.3595°E
- Type: Archeological museum, historic site
- Website: museedelaromanite.fr

Musée de la Romanité is an archeological museum in the French city of Nîmes, opened on 2 June 2018.

== Description ==
The museum is located in front of the Arena of Nîmes and has been designed by the French–Brazilian architect Elizabeth de Portzamparc. Its collection covers several periods of the history of Nîmes, including:

- The pre-Roman era, with the possibility for visitors to discover Gallic houses,
- The Roman era, with some well preserved mosaics, such the mosaic of Pentheus,
- The medieval era

== Photo gallery ==
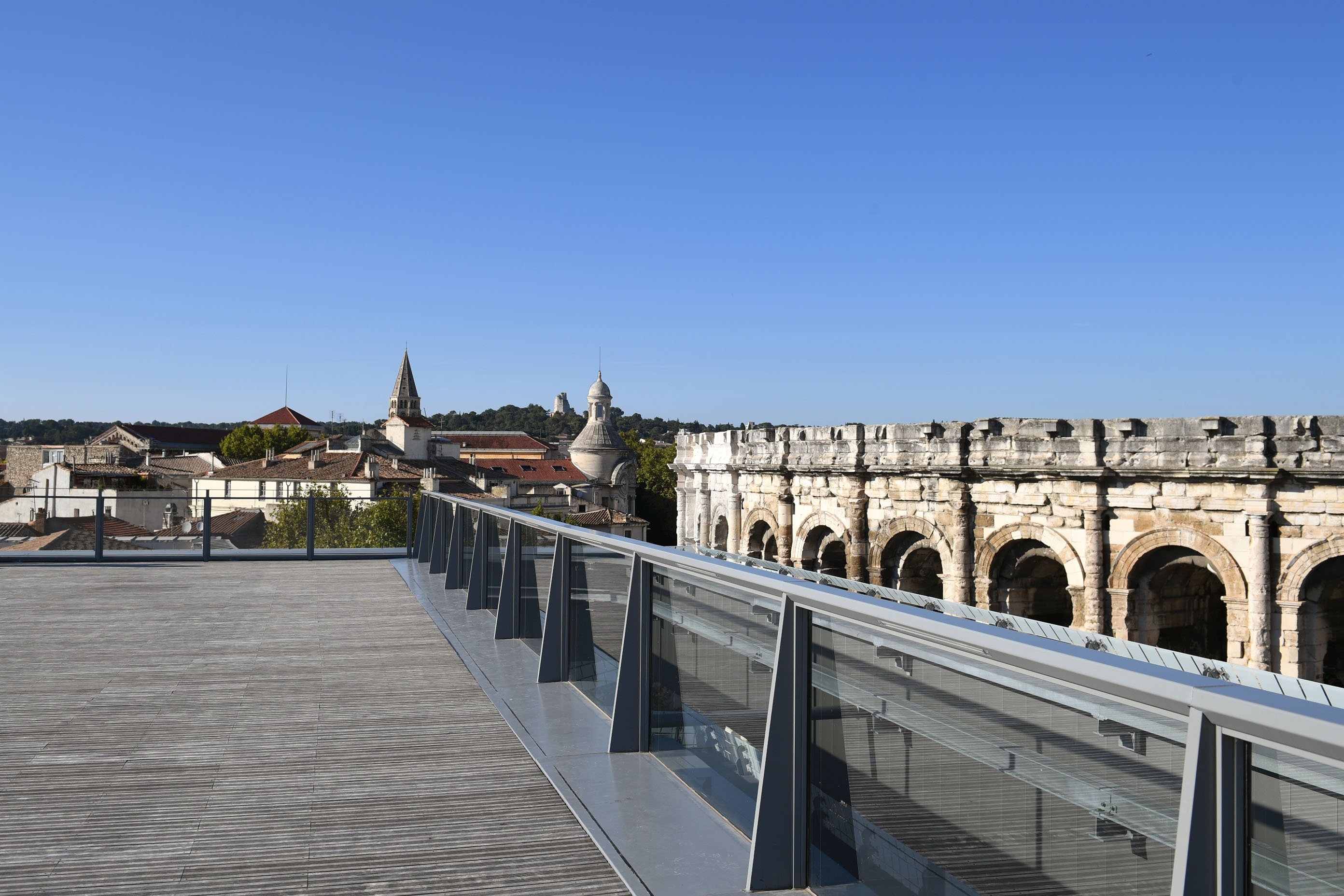
View from the museum towards the Arena of Nîmes

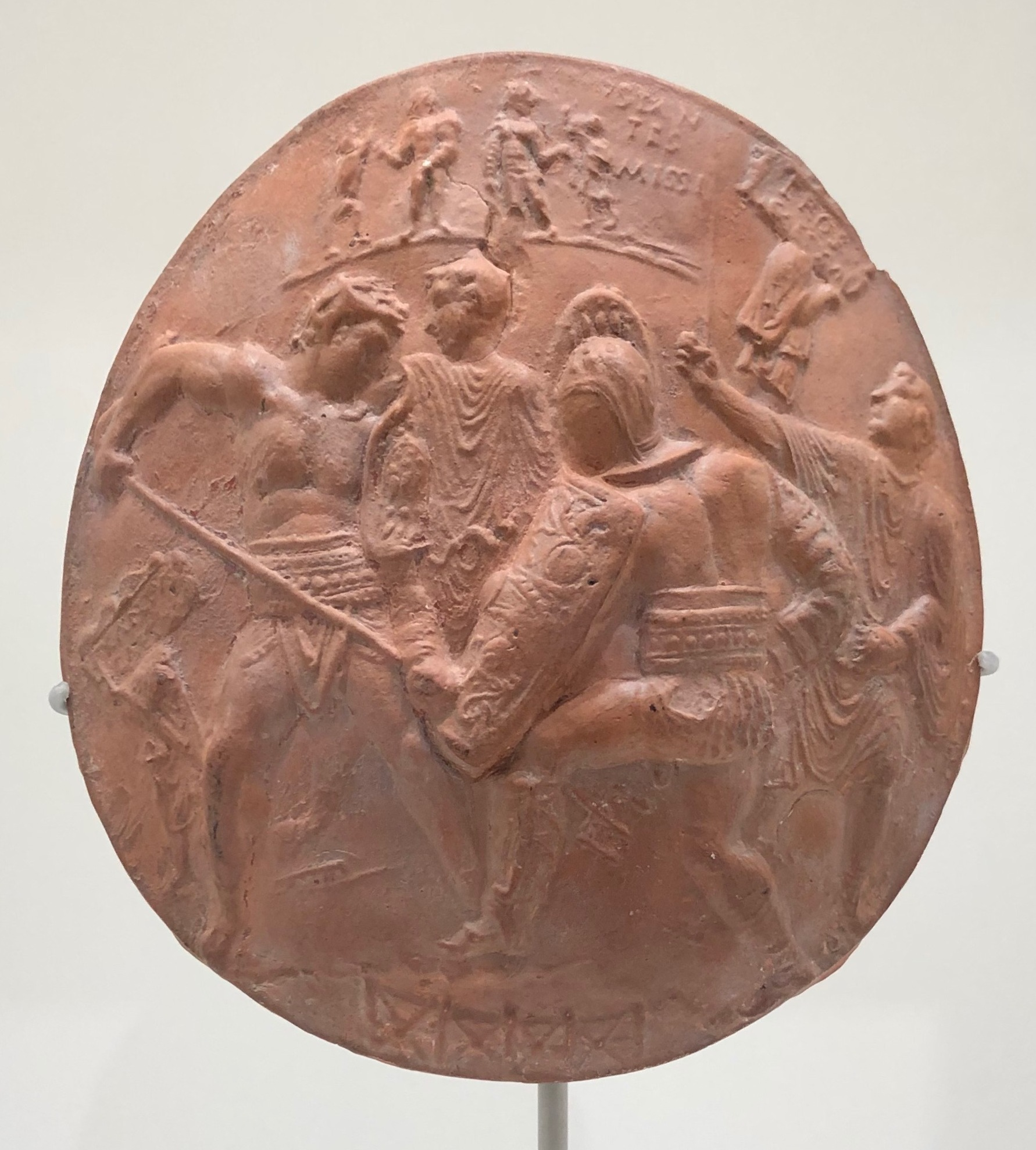
Cavillargues medallion

A cenotaph to a Gallo-Roman knight who died at 24, erected by his mother in the second half of the second century C.E.
