= Pollice verso =

Thumb gesture used in the context of gladiatorial combat

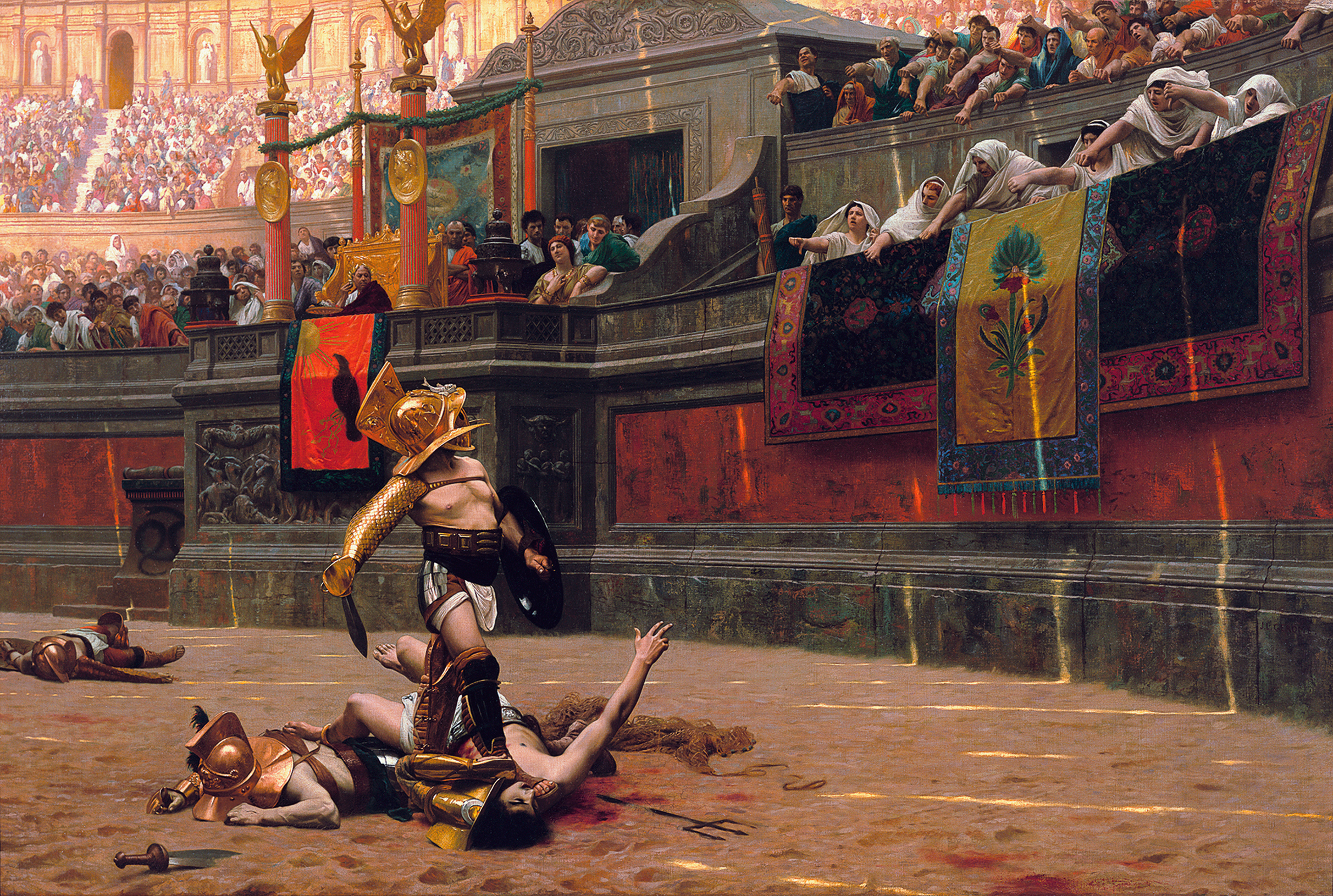
Pollice Verso, an 1872 painting by Jean-Léon Gérôme (Phoenix Art Museum), was the subject of great debate regarding its historical accuracy

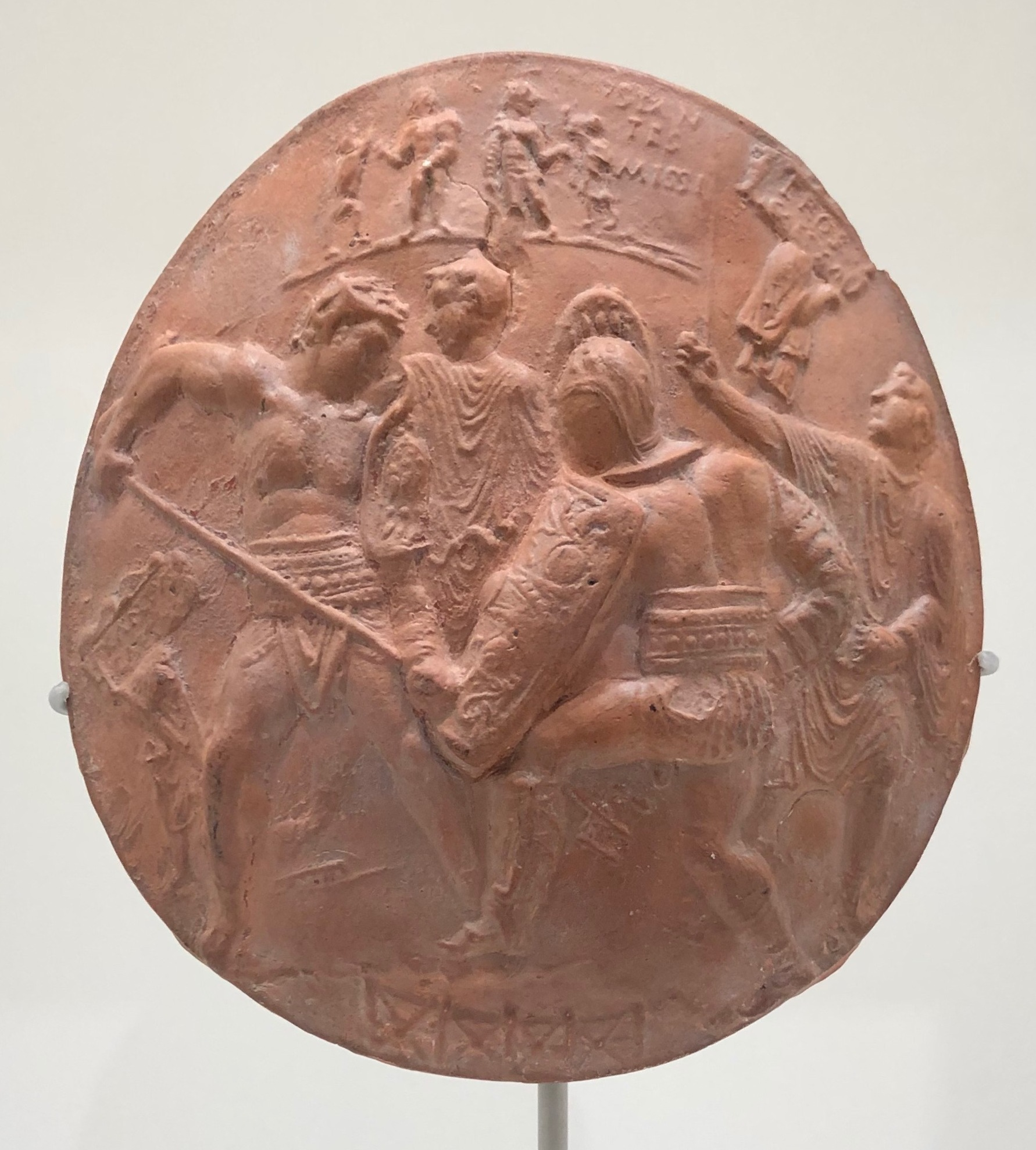
The Cavillargues medallion (c. AD 200) depicts the ēditor (games manager) showing a closed fist with wraparound thumb, meaning "spare him."

Pollice verso or verso pollice (Classical Latin: [ˈpɔlːɪkɛ ˈu̯ɛrs̠oː]) is a Latin phrase, meaning "with a turned thumb", that is used in the context of gladiatorial combat. It refers to a hand gesture or thumb signal used by Ancient Roman crowds to pass judgment on a defeated gladiator following duels in colosseums.

The precise gesture described by the phrase pollice verso, and its meaning, are the subject of scholarly debate.

According to Anthony Corbeill, a classical studies professor who has extensively researched the practice, thumbs up signalled killing a gladiator, while "a closed fist with a wraparound thumb" meant sparing him.

Zoologist Desmond Morris describes human gestures of this type to be culturally determined and transmitted.

== Meaning ==
The reason for the supremacy of the thumb over the other digits was debated even in ancient times. Roman provincial Macrobius observed that the name of the thumb (pollex) was derived from the Latin word for power (polleo). Another explanation is based on the thumb's unsuitability for the adornment of rings, thereby making it morally superior to the other fingers. Lactantius emphasized its utility and functionality, along with its strength and size. According to Fulgentius, the outstretched thumb paralleled other organs which were considered apatropaic, and like them it was seen as capable of warding off evil.

== Ancient Rome ==
The exact gesture described by the phrase pollice verso is unclear. From historical, archaeological, and literary records it is uncertain whether the thumb was turned up, turned down, held horizontally, or concealed inside the hand to indicate positive or negative opinions. Horace writes of a gesture using both thumbs to applaud a sporting event, though his exact meaning is unclear. According to Encyclopaedia Romana, Corbeill, who gave the most extensive discussion of the topic, translates Pliny's pollices premere as "pressing of the thumbs". According to his conclusion a merciful gesture consisted of the pressing of the thumb on the index finger of a closed fist, and a negative gesture signifying death, called infesto pollice by Quintilian, consists of an "erect thumb pointing upward". The definition of pollex in the Latin dictionary of Lewis and Short follows Corbeill's conclusion.

Juvenal uses verso pollice in the Satires:

Quondam hi cornicines et municipalis harenae
perpetui comites notaeque per oppida buccae
munera nunc edunt et, verso pollice vulgus
cum iubet, occidunt populariter ...

These men once were horn-blowers, who went the round of every provincial show,
and whose puffed-out cheeks were known in every village;
to-day they hold shows of their own, and win applause by slaying
whomsoever the crowd with a turn of the thumb bids them slay.

Prudentius mentions the thumb gesture (converso pollice), used by a Vestal virgin who delights in the carnage:

inde ad consessum caveae pudor almus et expers sanguinis it pietas hominum visura cruentos congressus mortesque et vulnera vendita pastu spectatura sacris oculis. sedet illa verendis vittarum insignis phaleris fruiturque lanistis. o tenerum mitemque animum! consurgit ad ictus et, quotiens victor ferrum iugulo inserit, illa delicias ait esse suas, pectusque iacentis virgo modesta iubet converso pollice rumpi, ne lateat pars ulla animae vitalibus imis altius inpresso dum palpitat ense secutor.

Then on to the gathering in the amphitheatre passes this figure of life-giving purity and bloodless piety [the Vestal], to see bloody battles and deaths of human beings and look on with holy eyes at wounds men suffer for the price of their keep. There she sits conspicuous with the awe-inspiring trappings of her head-bands and enjoys what the trainers have produced. What a soft, gentle heart! She rises at the blows, and every time a victor stabs his victim’s throat she calls him her pet; the modest virgin with a turn of her thumb bids him pierce the breast of his fallen foe so that no remnant of life shall stay lurking deep in his vitals while under a deeper thrust of the sword the fighter lies in the agony of death.

== In popular culture ==
The notion of the pollice verso thumb signal was brought to modern popular attention by an 1872 painting by French history painter Jean-Léon Gérôme entitled Pollice Verso (usually translated into English as Thumbs Down). It is a large canvas that depicts the Vestal Virgins signifying to a murmillo that they decree death on a fallen gladiator in the arena. The picture was purchased from Gérôme by U.S. department-store magnate Alexander Turney Stewart, who exhibited it in New York City, and it is now in the Phoenix Art Museum in Arizona.

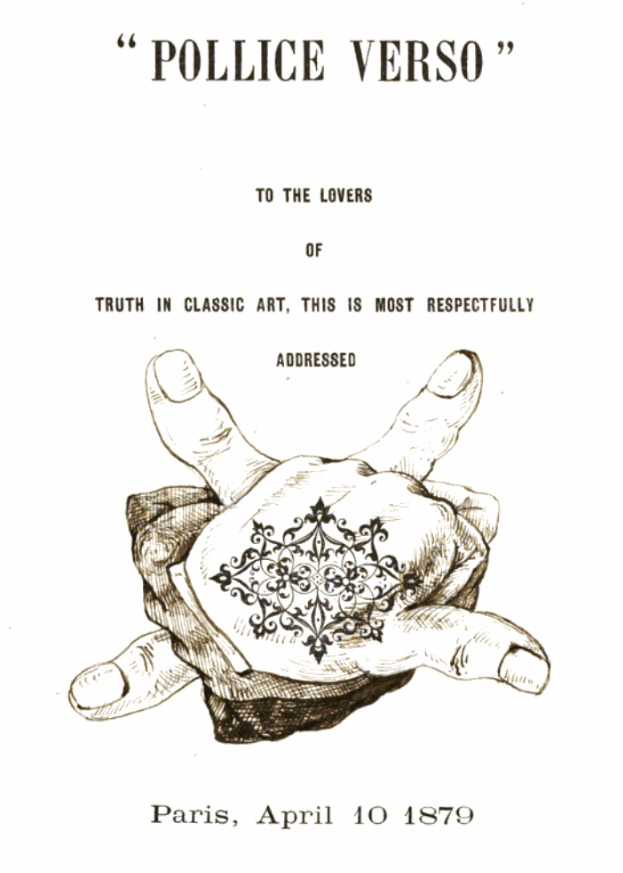
Title page with illustration from "Pollice Verso": To the Lovers of Truth in Classic Art, This is Most Respectfully Addressed, 1879

The painting almost immediately kicked off a controversy over the accuracy of Gerome's use of the thumbs-down gesture by spectators in the Colosseum. A 26-page pamphlet published in 1879, "Pollice Verso": To the Lovers of Truth in Classic Art, This is Most Respectfully Addressed, reprinted evidence for and against the accuracy of the painting, including a letter dated 8 December 1878 from Gérôme himself. Gérôme's painting greatly popularized the idea that thumbs up signaled life, and thumbs down signaled death, for a defeated gladiator. The gesture is used in many movies about Ancient Rome, including the 2000 film Gladiator, in which the Roman emperor Commodus uses a thumbs-up to spare the life of the film's hero, Maximus.

Pollice Verso is also the title of a controversial 1904 drawing of the Crucifixion by Australian artist Norman Lindsay, depicting Christ being rejected by nude pagans.
