= Cavillargues =

Commune in Occitanie, France

- Commune
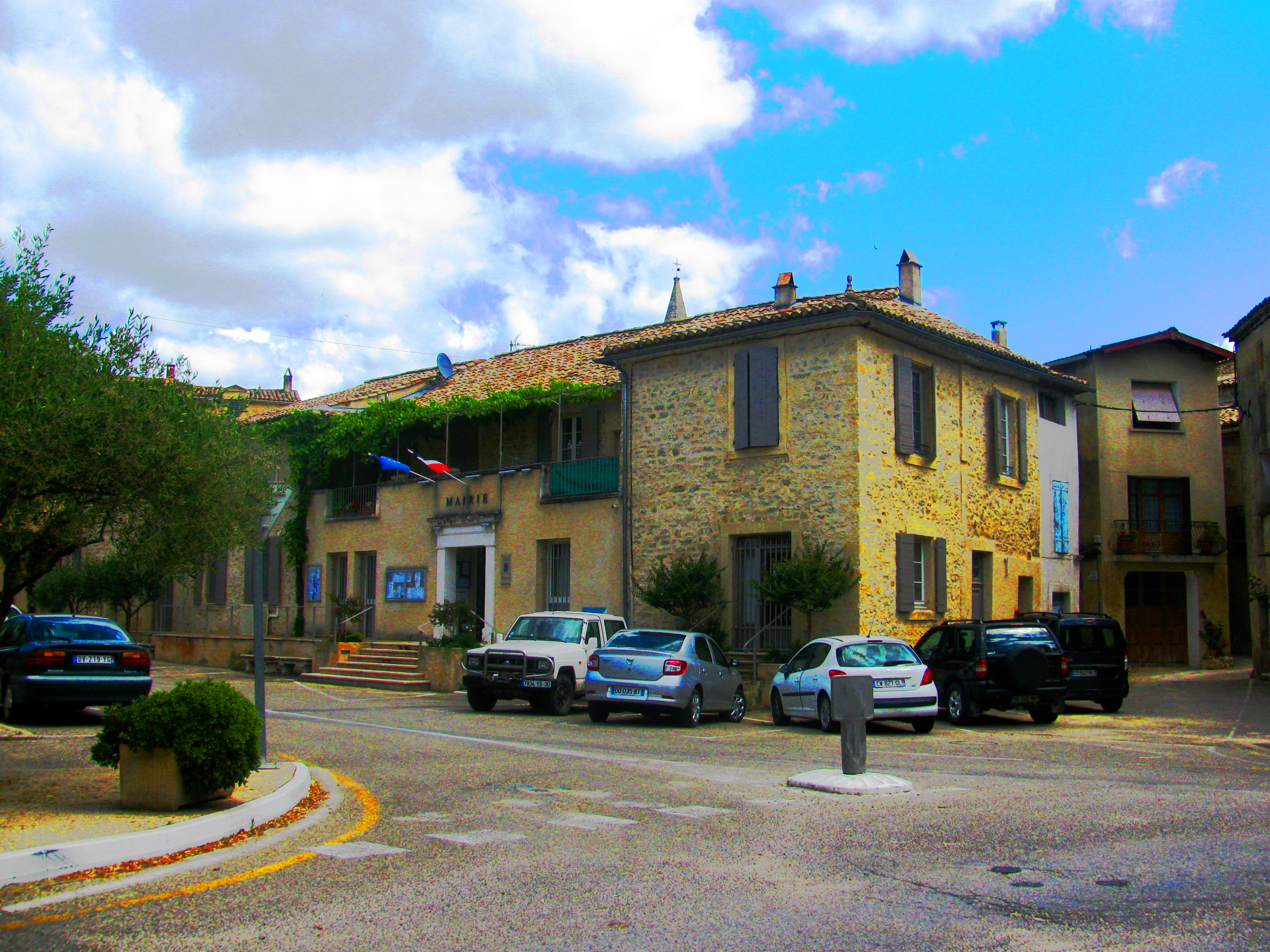
- The town hall of Cavillargues

- Coat of arms
- Location of Cavillargues
- Location within France Location within Occitanie
- Coordinates: 44°06′54″N 4°31′22″E
- Country: France
- Region: Occitania
- Department: Gard
- Arrondissement: Nîmes
- Canton: Bagnols-sur-Cèze
- Intercommunality: CA Gard Rhodanien

Government
  - Mayor (2020–2026): Laurent Nadal
- Area^{1}: 11.27 km^{2} (4.35 sq mi)
- Elevation: 137 m (449 ft)
- Highest elevation: 262 m (860 ft)
- Lowest elevation: 105 m (344 ft)
- Population (2023): 849
  - Density: 75.3/km^{2} (195/sq mi)
- Time zone: UTC+01:00 (CET)
  - Summer (DST): UTC+02:00 (CEST)
- INSEE/Postal code: 30076 /30330
- ^{1} French Land Register data, which excludes lakes, ponds, glaciers > 1 km^{2} (0.386 sq mi or 247 acres) and river estuaries.

Cavillargues (French pronunciation: [kavijaʁɡ]; Occitan: Cavilhargas) is a commune in the Gard department in southern France.

== Geography ==
=== Climate ===
Cavillargues has a hot-summer Mediterranean climate (Köppen climate classification Csa). The average annual temperature in Cavillargues is 14.1 °C (57.4 °F). The average annual rainfall is 845.8 mm (33.30 in) with November as the wettest month. The temperatures are highest on average in August, at around 23.4 °C (74.1 °F), and lowest in January, at around 5.8 °C (42.4 °F). The highest temperature ever recorded in Cavillargues was 41.5 °C (106.7 °F) on 28 June 2019; the coldest temperature ever recorded was −15.0 °C (5.0 °F) on 5 January 1971.

Climate data for Cavillargues (1991−2020 normals, extremes 1961−present)
Month	Jan	Feb	Mar	Apr	May	Jun	Jul	Aug	Sep	Oct	Nov	Dec	Year
Record high °C (°F)	21.6 (70.9)	24.2 (75.6)	28.0 (82.4)	30.5 (86.9)	34.2 (93.6)	41.5 (106.7)	39.8 (103.6)	41.0 (105.8)	36.2 (97.2)	31.1 (88.0)	24.0 (75.2)	21.1 (70.0)	41.5 (106.7)
Mean daily maximum °C (°F)	10.3 (50.5)	11.9 (53.4)	16.2 (61.2)	19.2 (66.6)	23.5 (74.3)	27.9 (82.2)	30.8 (87.4)	30.8 (87.4)	25.4 (77.7)	20.1 (68.2)	14.1 (57.4)	10.7 (51.3)	20.1 (68.2)
Daily mean °C (°F)	5.8 (42.4)	6.7 (44.1)	10.1 (50.2)	12.9 (55.2)	16.9 (62.4)	20.9 (69.6)	23.3 (73.9)	23.4 (74.1)	18.9 (66.0)	14.8 (58.6)	9.6 (49.3)	6.4 (43.5)	14.1 (57.4)
Mean daily minimum °C (°F)	1.3 (34.3)	1.4 (34.5)	4.0 (39.2)	6.6 (43.9)	10.3 (50.5)	13.9 (57.0)	15.9 (60.6)	15.9 (60.6)	12.4 (54.3)	9.5 (49.1)	5.0 (41.0)	2.0 (35.6)	8.2 (46.8)
Record low °C (°F)	−15.0 (5.0)	−14.0 (6.8)	−10.6 (12.9)	−3.6 (25.5)	−0.2 (31.6)	4.0 (39.2)	6.2 (43.2)	5.6 (42.1)	1.9 (35.4)	−2.5 (27.5)	−8.4 (16.9)	−14.0 (6.8)	−15.0 (5.0)
Average precipitation mm (inches)	74.3 (2.93)	44.0 (1.73)	51.7 (2.04)	73.3 (2.89)	66.6 (2.62)	45.2 (1.78)	38.0 (1.50)	47.0 (1.85)	107.0 (4.21)	119.0 (4.69)	120.8 (4.76)	58.9 (2.32)	845.8 (33.30)
Average precipitation days (≥ 1.0 mm)	6.6	5.1	4.9	7.1	6.9	5.1	3.6	4.4	5.7	7.2	8.5	6.6	71.6
Source: Météo-France

== Population ==
Historical population
Year	Pop.	±% p.a.
1968	510	—
1975	445	−1.93%
1982	492	+1.44%
1990	601	+2.53%
1999	645	+0.79%
2007	758	+2.04%
2012	807	+1.26%
2017	843	+0.88%
2023	849	+0.12%
Source: INSEE

== See also ==
- Communes of the Gard department
- Cavillargues medallion
