= Pollice Verso (Gérôme) =

1872 painting by Jean-Léon Gérôme

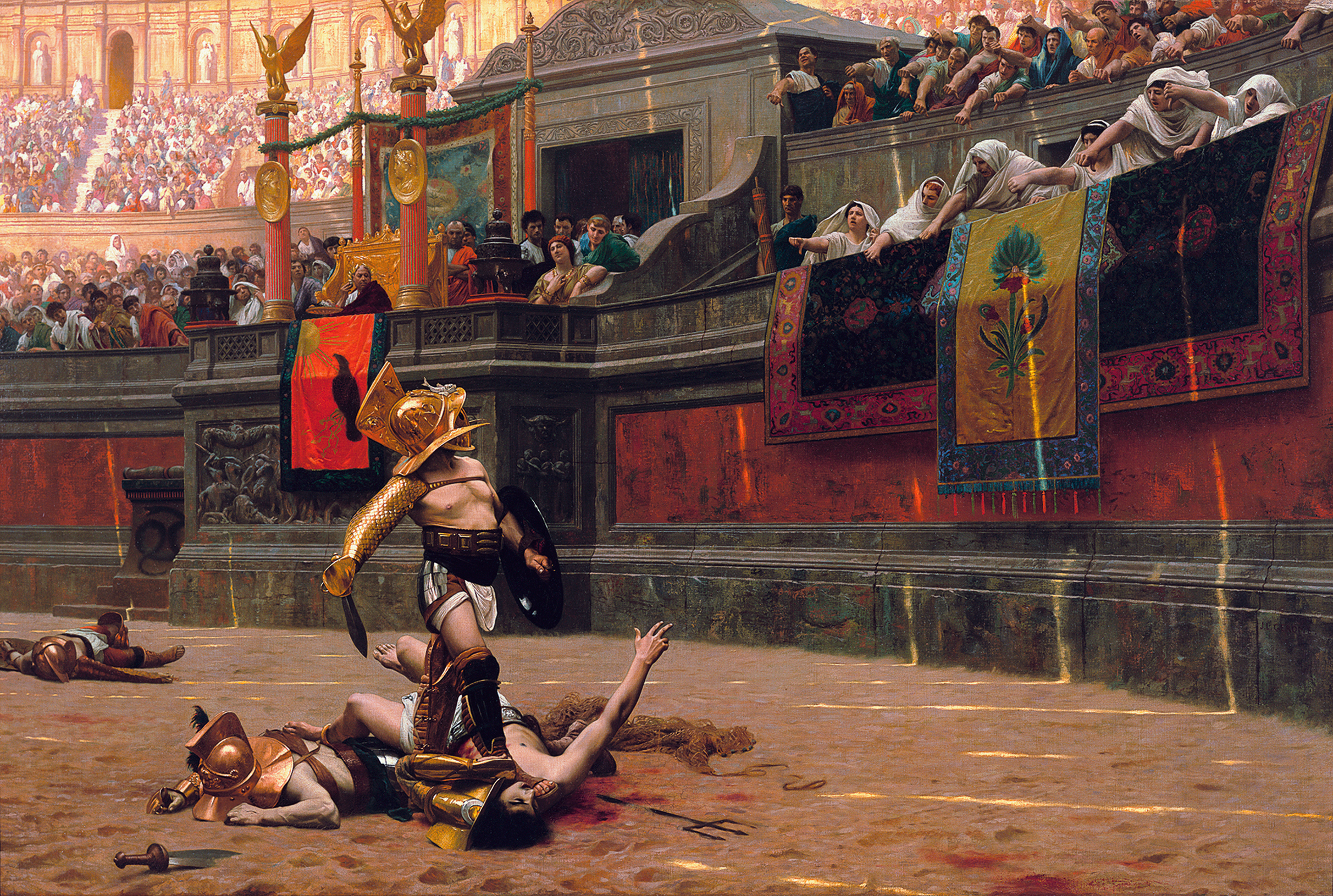
- Artist: Jean-Léon Gérôme
- Year: 1872
- Medium: Oil on canvas
- Dimensions: 96.5 cm × 149.2 cm (38.0 in × 58.7 in)
- Location: Phoenix Art Museum, Phoenix, Arizona

Pollice Verso (from Latin: with a turned thumb) is an 1872 painting by French artist Jean-Léon Gérôme, featuring the eponymous Roman gesture directed to the winning gladiator.

The thumbs-down gesture in the painting is given by spectators at the Colosseum, including the Vestals, to the victorious murmillo, while the defeated retiarius raises two fingers to plead for mercy. The painting was an inspiration for the 2000 film Gladiator, where Commodus holds out a raised thumb to spare the film's hero, Maximus.

== The painting ==
Along with gladiators, Vestals, and spectators, the picture shows the emperor in his box.

Alexander Turney Stewart purchased the painting from Gérôme at a price of 80,000 francs, setting a new record for the artist, and exhibited it in New York City. It is now in the Phoenix Art Museum in Arizona.

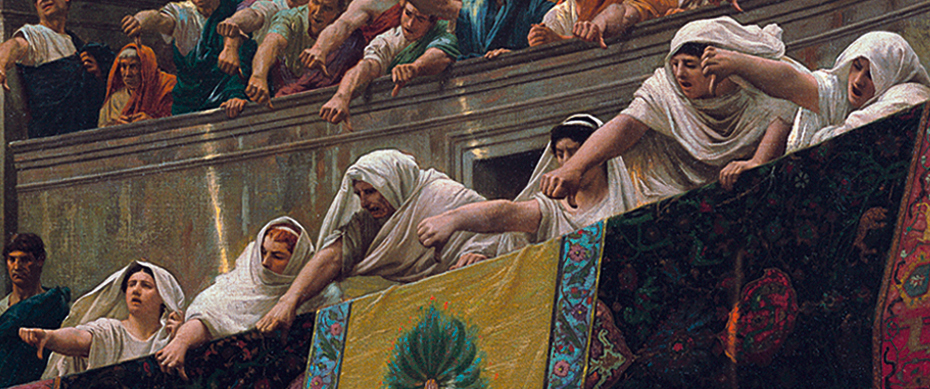
Detail: the Vestal virgins signal death for the defeated gladiator.

=== Historical accuracy ===
The painting almost immediately kicked off a controversy over the accuracy of Gérôme's use of the thumbs-down gesture by spectators in the Colosseum. A 26-page pamphlet published in 1879, "Pollice Verso": To the Lovers of Truth in Classic Art, This is Most Respectfully Addressed, reprinted evidence for and against the accuracy of the painting, including a letter dated 8 December 1878 from Gérôme himself.

The controversy remains unsettled. The exact gesture described by the phrase pollice verso is not known. From historical, archaeological and literary records from ancient Rome, it remains uncertain whether the thumb was turned up, turned down, held horizontally, or concealed inside the hand to indicate positive or negative opinions. Gérôme's painting greatly popularized the idea that thumbs up signaled life, and thumbs down signaled death, for a defeated gladiator.

Gérôme's depiction of the Colosseum's architecture is based on accurate drawings, and the armor of the gladiators follows the design of those found in Pompeii, although there are some inaccuracies in the murmillo's armor. His depiction of blood-thirsty Vestal virgins demanding death may have been inspired by a passage by the ancient Christian author Prudentius, who disapproved of the carnage in the arena:

Then on to the gathering in the amphitheatre passes this figure of life-giving purity and bloodless piety [the Vestal], to see bloody battles and deaths of human beings and look on with holy eyes at wounds men suffer for the price of their keep. There she sits conspicuous with the awe-inspiring trappings of her head-bands and enjoys what the trainers have produced. What a soft, gentle heart! She rises at the blows, and every time a victor stabs his victim’s throat she calls him her pet; the modest virgin with a turn of her thumb bids him pierce the breast of his fallen foe so that no remnant of life shall stay lurking deep in his vitals while under a deeper thrust of the sword the fighter lies in the agony of death.

=== Influence on cinema ===
This painting and others by Gérôme (including his earlier Ave Caesar! Morituri te Salutant) had a strong influence on the visual portrayal of the ancient world by later filmmakers, beginning with silent movies. The painting was a catalyst for director Ridley Scott; when the producers of Gladiator showed him a reproduction of the painting before he read the script, Scott recalls, "That image spoke to me of the Roman Empire in all its glory and wickedness. I knew right then and there I was hooked."

== Sculpture ==
In his Thirties, Gérôme took up sculpture. His first work was a large bronze statue of a gladiator holding his foot on his victim, based on Pollice Verso and first shown to the public at the Universal Exhibition of 1878 in Paris. After Gérôme's death, in 1909, his son-in-law Aimé Morot created Gérôme Sculpting "The Gladiators": Monument to Gérôme, which comprised a new casting of Gérôme's statue along with Morot's portrait sculpture of Gérôme at work. Morot's sculpture resides in the Musée d'Orsay in Paris.

== Gallery ==
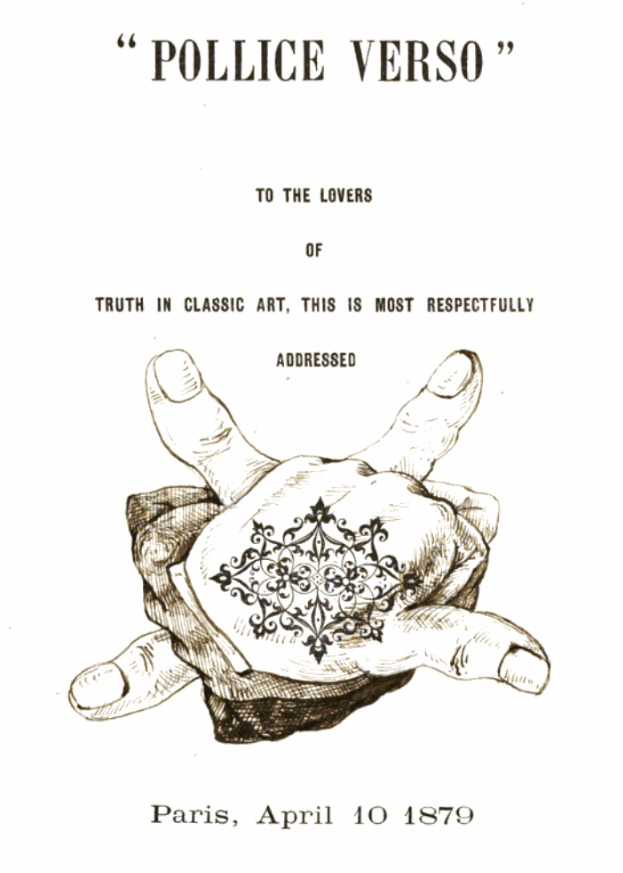
Title page with illustration from "Pollice Verso": To the Lovers of Truth in Classic Art, This is Most Respectfully Addressed, 1879.

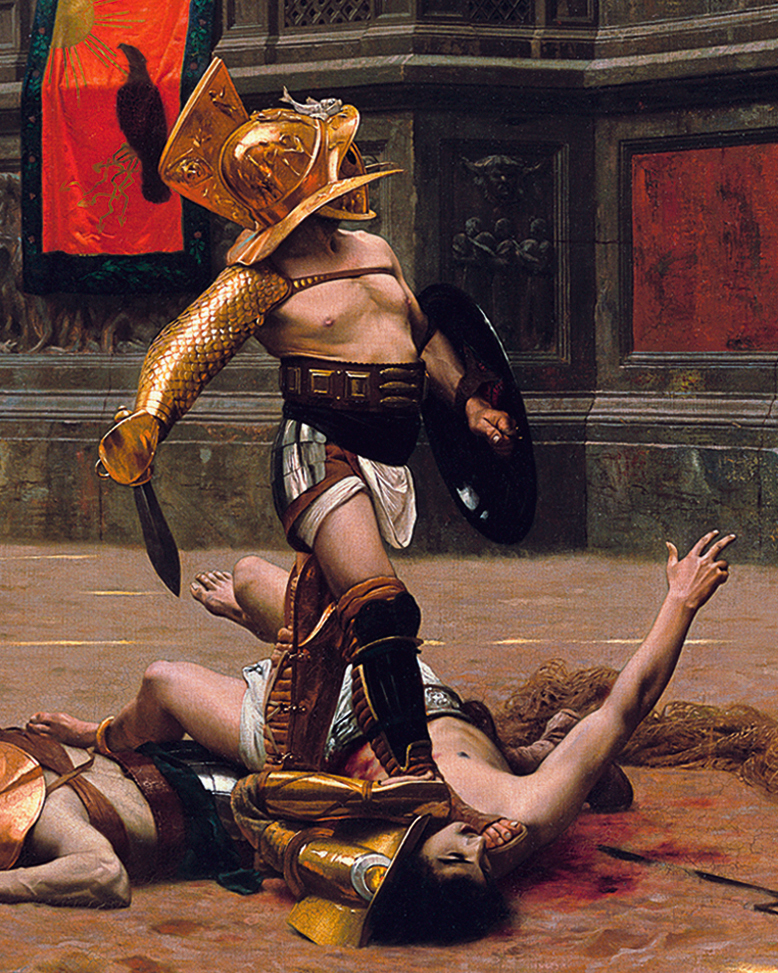
Detail: close-up of the gladiators

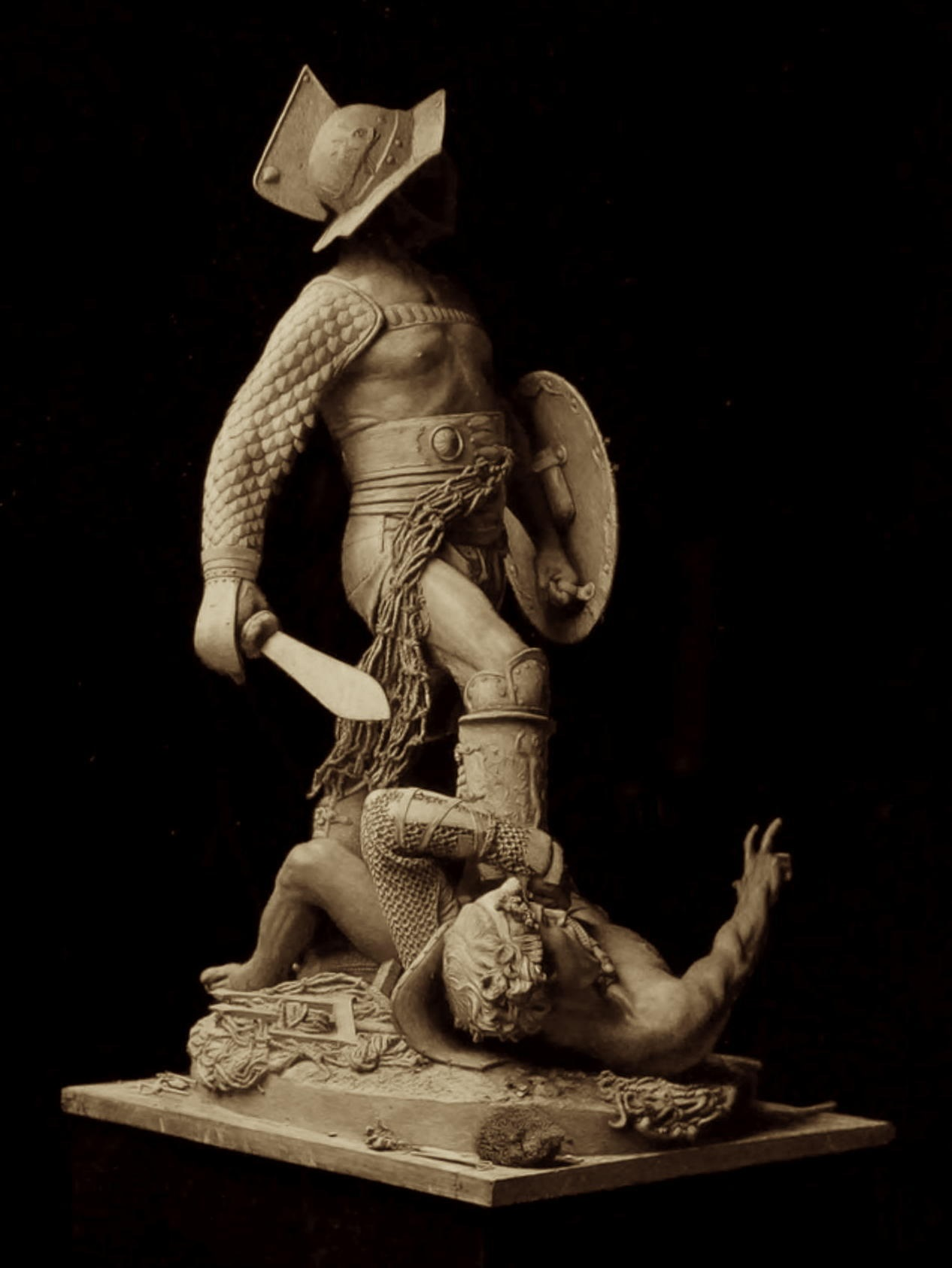
The Gladiators, bronze, 1878, by Jean-Léon Gérôme; photogravure Goupil c. 1892

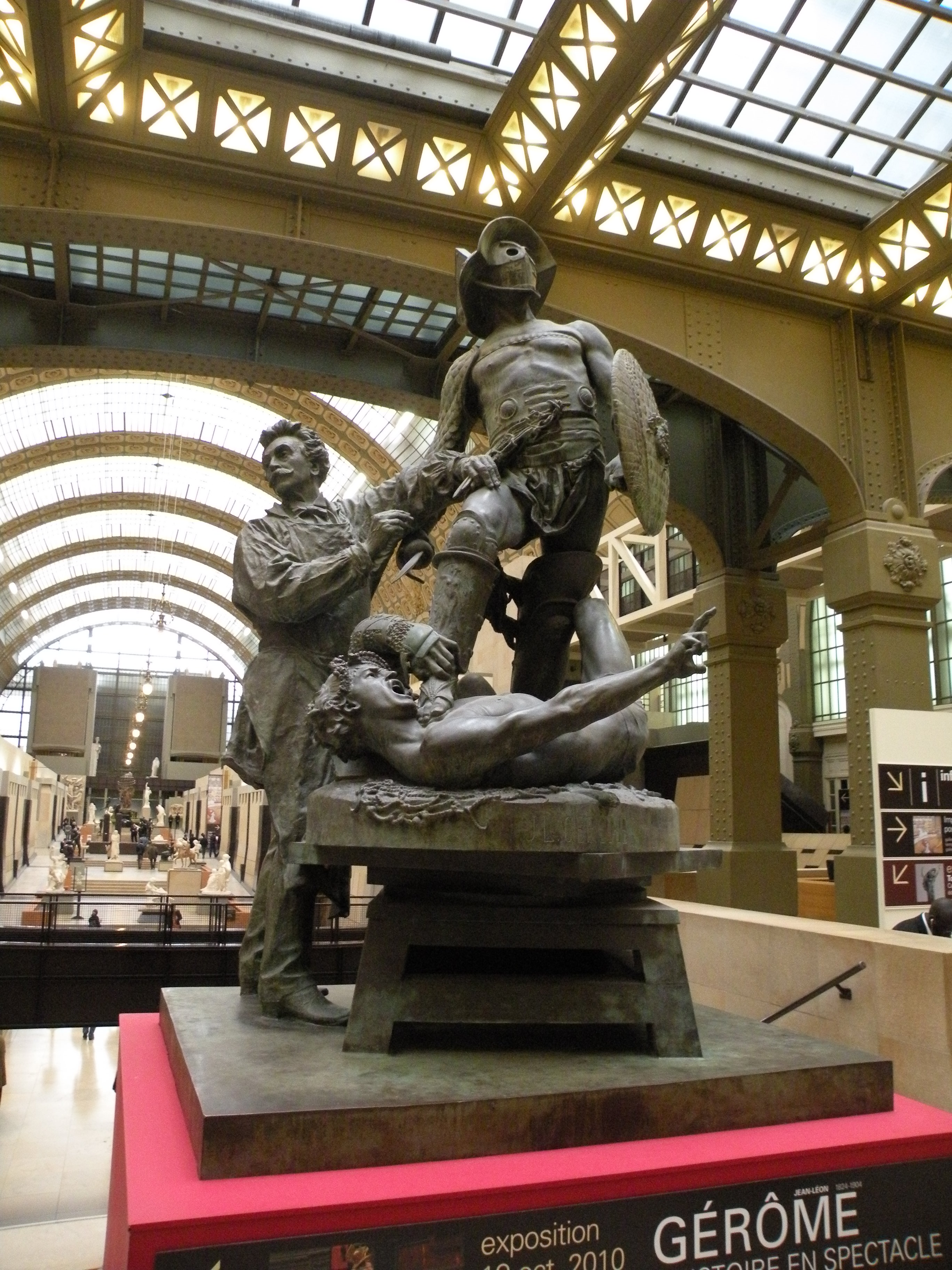
Gérôme Sculpting "The Gladiators": Monument to Gérôme, 1909, by Aimé Morot, Musée d'Orsay

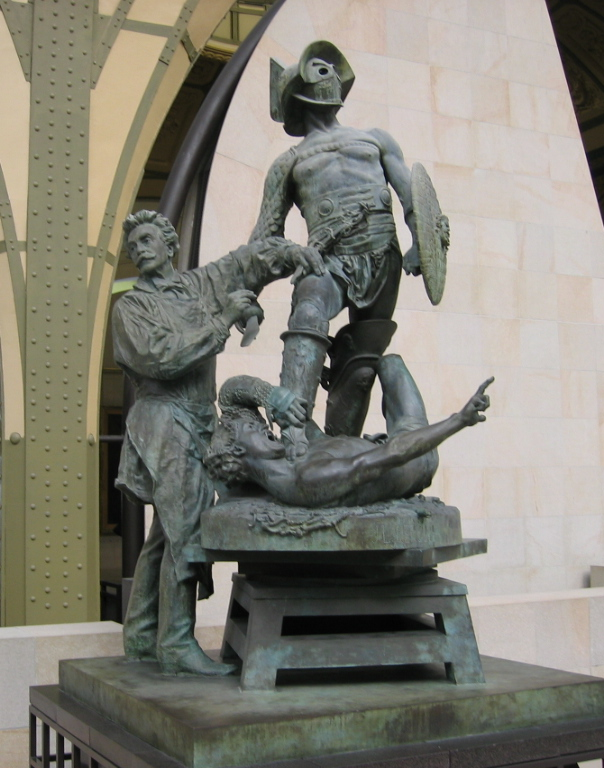
Another view of the Morot sculpture

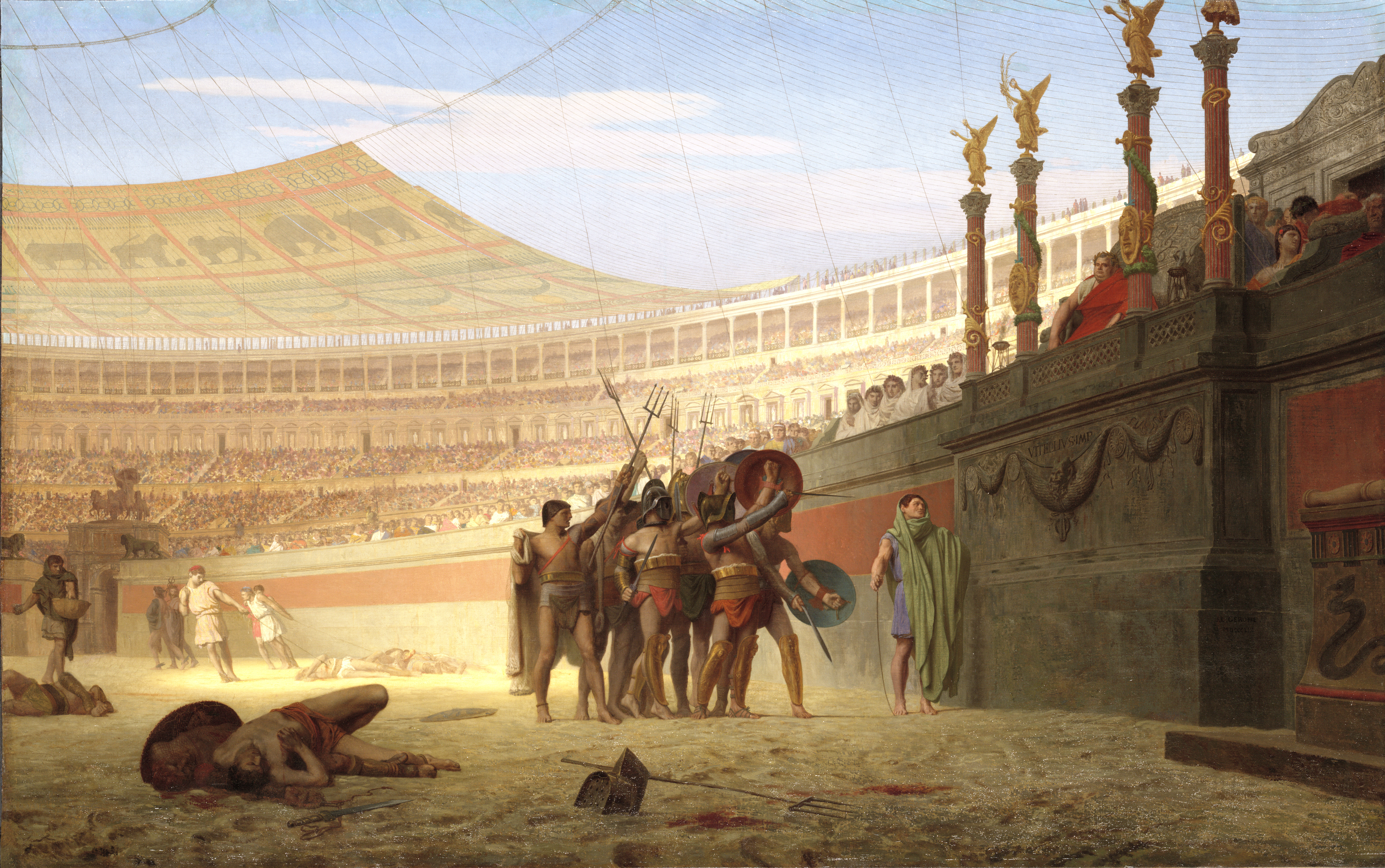
Ave Caesar! Morituri te Salutant, 1859, by Jean-Léon Gérôme, Yale University Art Gallery

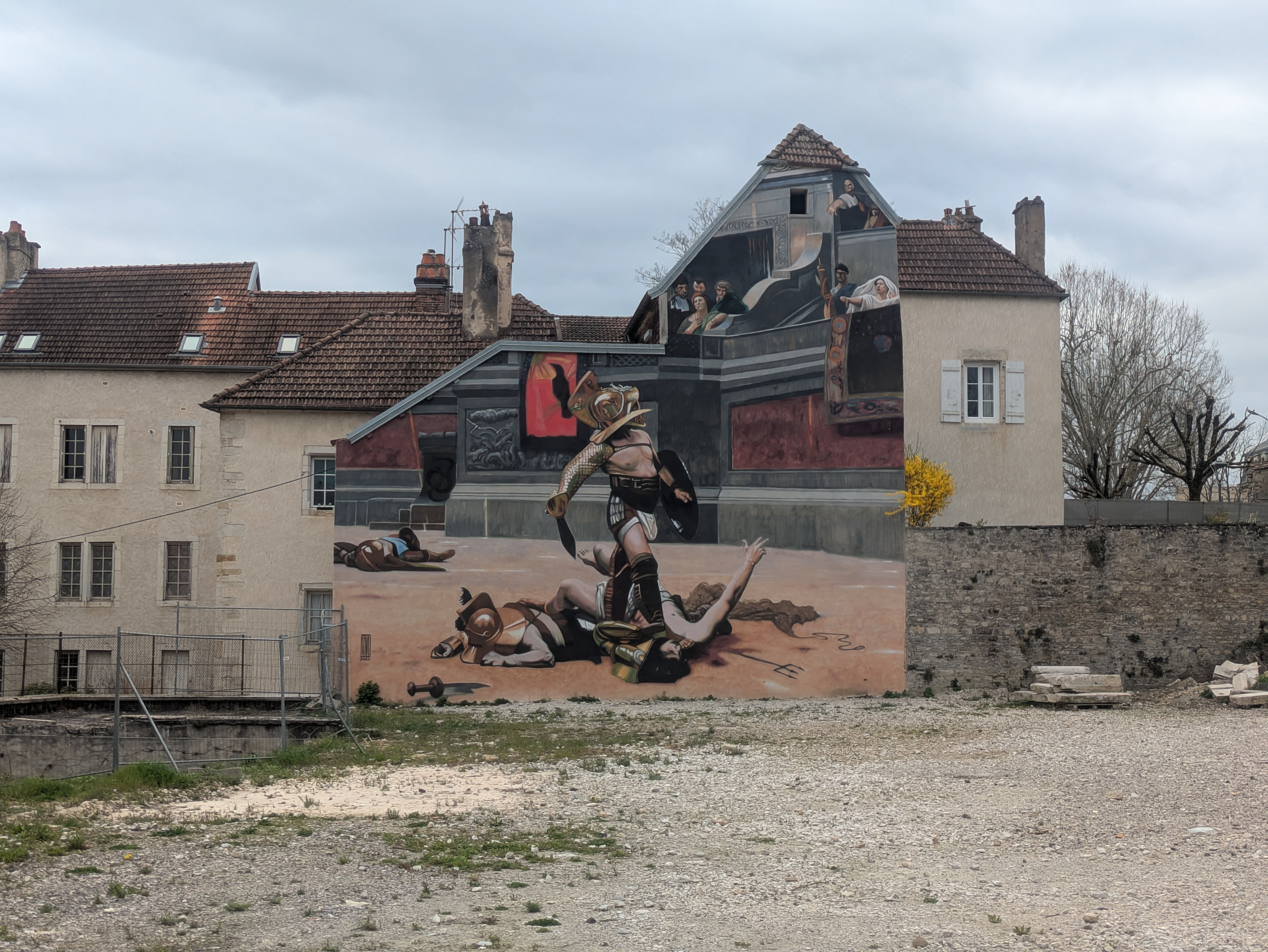
Pollice Verso fresco in Vesoul, France
