= Anthony Corbeill =

American professor of Classics

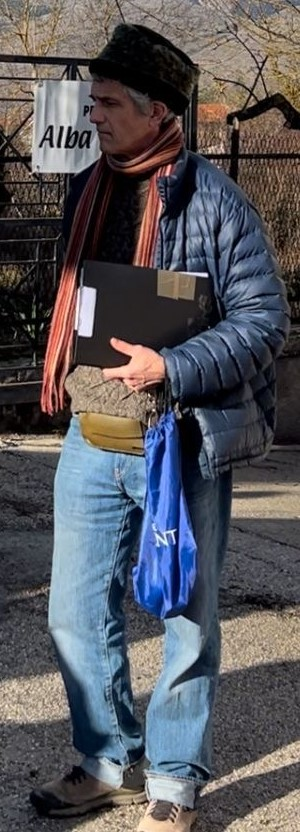
- Corbeill in 2024
- Born: 30 December 1960 (age 65)
- Title: Basil L. Gildersleeve Professor of Classics

Academic background
- Education: University of Michigan (BA); University of California at Berkeley (MA, Ph.D.)

Anthony Philip Corbeill (born 30 December 1960) is an American professor of classics. He is currently the Basil L. Gildersleeve Professor of Classics at the University of Virginia. He was formerly a professor at the University of Kansas.

== Academic history ==
Corbeill was born on 30 December 1960. He received his B.A. from the University of Michigan and his M.A. and Ph.D. in Classical Languages from the University of California at Berkeley in 1990. In addition, he has held fellowships working on the Thesaurus Linguae Latinae in Munich, Germany, the American Academy in Rome, the Institute for Research in the Humanities at the University of Wisconsin–Madison, and All Souls College, Oxford.

== Work ==
Corbeill has published three books, Controlling Laughter. Political Humor in the Late Roman Republic (1996), Nature Embodied. Gesture in Ancient Rome (2004), and Sexing the World: Grammatical Gender and Biological Sex in Ancient Rome (2015). He is best known for his research concerning Roman literature and cultural history, as well as publishing articles concerning grammatical gender and gesture (such as the pollice verso, of which it has been argued that Corbeill "provides the most thorough review").

In January 2016, he won the Society for Classical Studies' Goodwin Award for his work on Sexing the World.

== Bibliography ==
Corbeill has released the following books:

- Controlling Laughter. Political Humor in the Late Roman Republic (1996) Princeton, NJ: Princeton University Press. ISBN 9780691027395.
- Nature Embodied. Gesture in Ancient Rome (2004) Princeton, NJ: Princeton University Press. ISBN 9780691074948.
- Sexing the World: Grammatical Gender and Biological Sex in Ancient Rome (2015) Princeton, NJ: Princeton University Press. ISBN 9780691163222.
- Cicero, De Haruspicum Responsis: Introduction, Text, Translation, and Commentary (2023) Oxford, UK: Oxford University Press. ISBN 9780192868954.
