= Las Meninas =

1656 painting by Diego Velázquez

- Artist: Diego Velázquez
- Year: 1656
- Medium: Oil on canvas
- Dimensions: 318 cm × 276 cm (125.2 in × 108.7 in)
- Location: Museo del Prado, Madrid

Las Meninas (Spanish: [las meˈninas]; Spanish for 'The Ladies-in-waiting') (Note: The name is sometimes given in print as Las Meniñas, but there is no word *meniña in Spanish. The word means 'girl from a noble family brought up to serve at court' and comes from menina (Portuguese for 'girl').) is a 1656 oil painting in the Museo del Prado in Madrid, by Diego Velázquez, the leading artist in the court of King Philip IV of Spain and Portugal, and of the Spanish Golden Age. It has become one of the most widely analysed works in Western painting for the way its complex and enigmatic composition raises questions about reality and illusion, and for the uncertain relationship it creates between the viewer and the figures depicted.

The painting is believed by the art historian F. J. Sánchez Cantón to depict a room in the Royal Alcázar of Madrid during the reign of Philip IV, and presents several figures, most of them identifiable from the Spanish court, captured in a particular moment as if in a snapshot. (Note: In 1855, William Stirling wrote in Velázquez and his works: "Velázquez seems to have anticipated the discovery of Daguerre and, taking a real room and real people grouped together by chance, to have fixed them, as it were, by magic, for all time, on canvas".) Some of the figures look out of the canvas towards the viewer, while others interact among themselves. The five-year-old Infanta Margaret Theresa is surrounded by her entourage of maids of honour, chaperone, bodyguard, two dwarfs and a dog. Just behind them, Velázquez portrays himself working at a large canvas. Velázquez looks outwards beyond the pictorial space to where a viewer of the painting would stand. The mirror in the background reflects the upper bodies of the king and queen. They appear to be placed outside the picture space in a position similar to that of the viewer, although some scholars have speculated that their image is a reflection from the painting on which Velázquez is shown working.

The Italian Baroque painter Luca Giordano described Las Meninas as the "theology of painting", and in 1827 the president of the Royal Academy of Arts in London Sir Thomas Lawrence called the work "the true philosophy of the art". The painting has since become a focal point for scholarly debates about representation, spectatorship, and the social status of the artist. Michel Foucault opened The Order of Things (1966) with an extended analysis of its treatment of classical representation; Svetlana Alpers read it as Velázquez's claim for painting as a liberal art; and Leo Steinberg (1981) and Joel Snyder (1985) have offered competing accounts of its spatial logic and the function of the mirror on the back wall.

== Background ==
=== Court of Philip IV ===
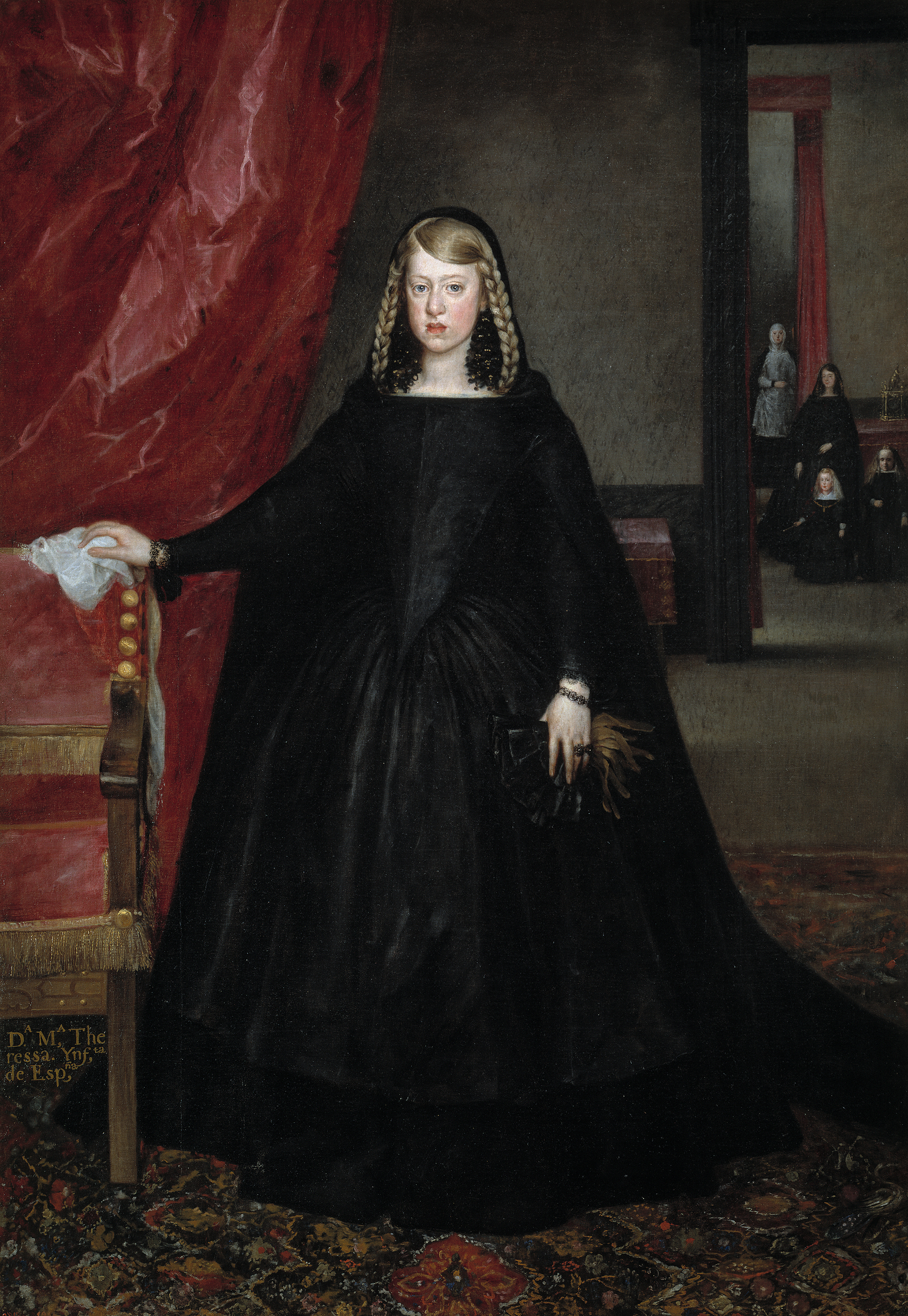
The Infanta Margaret Theresa (1651–1673), in mourning dress for her father in 1666, by del Mazo. The background figures include her young brother Charles II and the dwarf Maria Bárbola, also in Las Meninas. She left Spain for her marriage in Vienna the same year.

In 17th-century Spain, painters rarely enjoyed high social status. Painting was regarded as a craft, not an art such as poetry or music. Nonetheless, Velázquez worked his way up through the ranks of the court of Philip IV, and in February 1651 was appointed palace chamberlain (aposentador mayor del palacio). The post brought him status and material reward, but its duties made heavy demands on his time. During the remaining eight years of his life, he painted only a few works, mostly portraits of the royal family.

Philip IV's first wife, Elizabeth of France, died in 1644, and their only son, Balthasar Charles, died two years later. Lacking an heir, Philip married Mariana of Austria in 1649, (Note: Mariana of Austria was betrothed to Balthasar Charles in 1646.) and Margaret Theresa (1651–1673) was their first child, and their only one at the time of the painting. Subsequently, she had a short-lived brother Philip Prospero (1657–1661), and then Charles (1661–1700) arrived, who succeeded to the throne as Charles II at the age of three. Velázquez painted portraits of Mariana and her children, and although Philip himself resisted being portrayed in his old age, he allowed Velázquez to include him in Las Meninas. In the early 1650s he gave Velázquez the Pieza Principal (main room) of the late Balthasar Charles's living quarters, by then serving as the palace museum, to use as his studio, where Las Meninas is set. Philip had his own chair in the studio and would often sit and watch Velázquez at work. Although constrained by rigid etiquette, the art-loving king seems to have had a close relationship with the painter. After Velázquez's death, Philip wrote "I am crushed" in the margin of a memorandum on the choice of his successor.

During the 1640s and 1650s, Velázquez served as both court painter and curator of Philip IV's expanding collection of European art. He appears to have been granted an unusual degree of autonomy in the role. He supervised the decoration and interior design of the rooms holding the most valued paintings, adding mirrors, statues and tapestries. He was also responsible for the sourcing, attribution, hanging and inventory of many of the Spanish king's paintings. By the early 1650s, Velázquez was widely respected in Spain as a connoisseur. Much of the collection of the Museo del Prado today—including works by Titian, Raphael and Rubens—was acquired and assembled under Velázquez's curatorship.

=== Provenance and condition ===
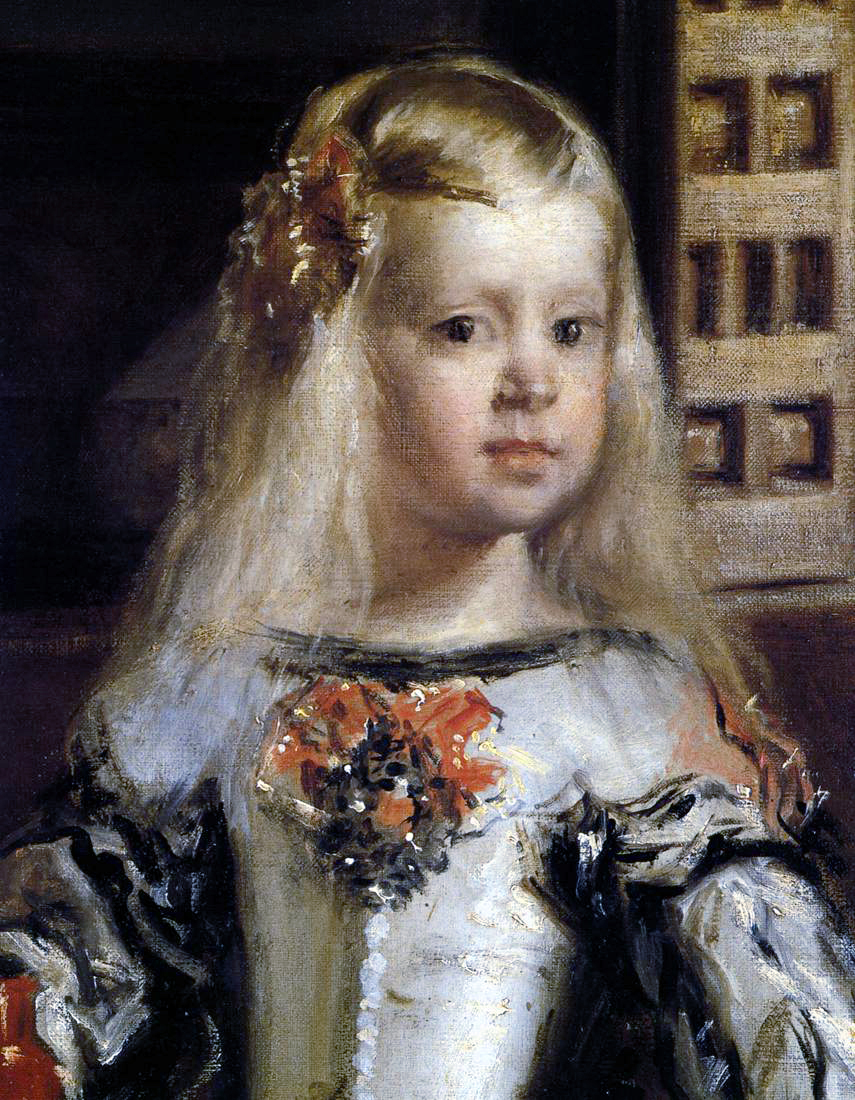
Detail showing Philip IV's daughter, the Infanta Margaret Theresa. Most of her left cheek was repainted after being damaged in the fire of 1734.

The painting was referred to in the earliest inventories as La Familia ("The Family"). Las Meninas is described in the inventory of 1666 by García de Medrano. A detailed description of Las Meninas, which provides the identification of several of the figures, was published by Antonio Palomino ("the Giorgio Vasari of the Spanish Golden Age") in 1724. Examination under infrared light reveals minor pentimenti, that is, there are traces of earlier working that the artist himself later altered. For example, at first Velázquez's own head inclined to his right rather than his left.

The painting has been cut down on both the left and right sides. (Note: There is no documentation as to the dates or reasons for the trimming. López-Rey states that the truncation is more notable on the right.) It was damaged in the 1734 fire that destroyed the Alcázar, and was restored by court painter Juan García de Miranda (1677–1749). The left cheek of the infanta was almost completely repainted to compensate for a substantial loss of pigment. (Note: Records of 1735 show that the original frame was lost during the painting's rescue from the fire. The appraisal of 1747–48 refers to the painting as having been "lately restored".) After its rescue from the fire the painting was inventoried as part of the royal collection in 1747–48, and the infanta was misidentified as Maria Theresa, Margaret Theresa's older half-sister, an error that was repeated when the painting was inventoried at the new Madrid Royal Palace in 1772. A 1794 inventory reverted to a version of the earlier title, The Family of Philip IV, which was repeated in the records of 1814. The painting entered the Museo del Prado's collection upon its founding in 1819. In 1843, the Prado catalogue listed the work for the first time as Las Meninas.

In recent years, the picture has lost texture and hue. Due to exposure to pollution and crowds of visitors, the once-vivid contrasts between blue and white pigments in the costumes of the meninas have faded. It was last cleaned in 1984 under the supervision of the British conservator John Brealey to remove a "yellow veil" of dust that had gathered since the previous restoration in the 19th century. The cleaning provoked, according to the art historian Federico Zeri, "furious protests, not because the picture had been damaged in any way, but because it looked different". In addition, "[t]he Spanish press criticized Brealey at every opportunity, arguing that only someone born and raised in Spain could truly comprehend, and be allowed to handle, such an iconic piece of their culture. One day, a small riot broke out outside the room where Brealey was working". However, in the opinion of the Velázquez expert José López-Rey, the "restoration was impeccable". Due to its size, importance and value, the painting is not lent out for exhibition. (Note: The work was evacuated to Geneva by the Republican Government, together with much of the Prado's collection, during the last months of the Spanish Civil War, where it hung in an exhibition of Spanish paintings in 1939.)

=== Painting materials ===
A thorough technical investigation including a pigment analysis was conducted around 1981 in the Museo del Prado. The analysis revealed the usual pigments of the Baroque period frequently used by Velázquez. The main pigments used for this painting were lead white, azurite (for the skirt of the kneeling menina), vermilion and red lake, ochres and carbon blacks.

== Description ==
=== Subjects ===
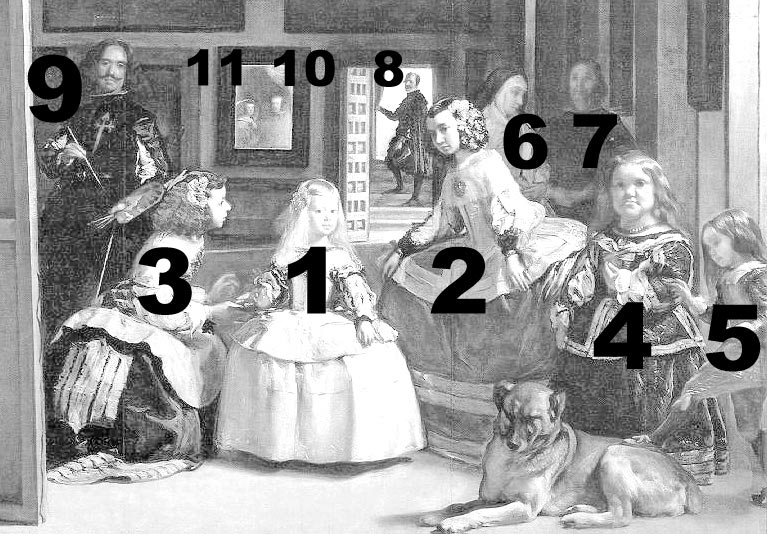
Key to the people represented: see text

Las Meninas is set in Velázquez's studio in Philip IV's alcázar palace in Madrid. The high-ceilinged room is presented, in the words of Silvio Gaggi, as "a simple box that could be divided into a perspective grid with a single vanishing point". In the centre of the foreground stands the Infanta Margaret Theresa (1). The five-year-old infanta, who later married Holy Roman Emperor Leopold I, was at this point Philip and Mariana's only surviving child. (Note: Maria Theresa was by then queen of France as wife of Louis XIV. Philip Prospero, Prince of Asturias, was born the following year, but died at four, shortly before his brother Charles II was born. One daughter from this marriage, and five from Philip's first marriage, died in infancy.) She is attended by two ladies-in-waiting, or meninas: Doña Isabel de Velasco (2), who is poised to curtsy to the princess, and Doña María Agustina Sarmiento de Sotomayor (3), who kneels before Margaret Theresa, offering her a drink from a red cup, or búcaro, that she holds on a golden tray. To the right of the infanta are two dwarves: the achondroplastic Austrian Mari Bárbola (4), and the Italian Nicolás Pertusato (5), who playfully tries to rouse a sleepy mastiff with his foot. Doña Marcela de Ulloa (6), the princess's chaperone, stands behind them, dressed in mourning and talking to a bodyguard (or guardadamas) (7), Diego Ruiz Azcona.

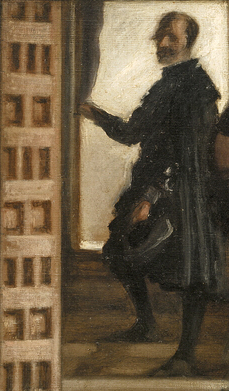
Detail showing Don José Nieto Velázquez at the door in the background of the painting

To the rear and at right stands Don José Nieto Velázquez (8)—the queen's chamberlain during the 1650s, and head of the royal tapestry works—who may have been a relative of the artist. Nieto is shown standing but in pause, with his right knee bent and his feet on different steps. As the art critic Harriet Stone observes, it is uncertain whether he is "coming or going". He is rendered in silhouette and appears to hold open a curtain on a short flight of stairs, with an unclear wall or space behind. Both this backlight and the open doorway reveal space behind: in the words of the art historian Analisa Leppanen, they lure "our eyes inescapably into the depths". The royal couple's reflection pushes in the opposite direction, forward into the picture space. The vanishing point of the perspective is in the doorway, as can be shown by extending the line of the meeting of wall and ceiling on the right. Nieto is seen only by the king and queen, who share the viewer's point of view, and not by the figures in the foreground. In the footnotes of Joel Snyder's article, the author recognises that Nieto is the queen's attendant and was required to be at hand to open and close doors for her. Snyder suggests that Nieto appears in the doorway so that the king and queen might depart. In the context of the painting, Snyder argues that the scene is the end of the royal couple's sitting for Velázquez and they are preparing to exit, explaining that is "why the menina to the right of the Infanta begins to curtsy".

Velázquez (9) is pictured to the left of the scene, looking outward past a large canvas supported by an easel. On his chest is the red cross of the Order of Santiago, which he did not receive until 1659, three years after the painting was completed. According to Palomino, Philip ordered this to be added after Velázquez's death, "and some say that his Majesty himself painted it". From the painter's belt hang the symbolic keys of his court offices.

A mirror on the back wall reflects the upper bodies and heads of two figures identified from other paintings, and by Palomino, as King Philip IV (10) and Queen Mariana (11). The most common assumption is that the reflection shows the couple in the pose they are holding for Velázquez as he paints them, while their daughter watches; and that the painting therefore shows their view of the scene.

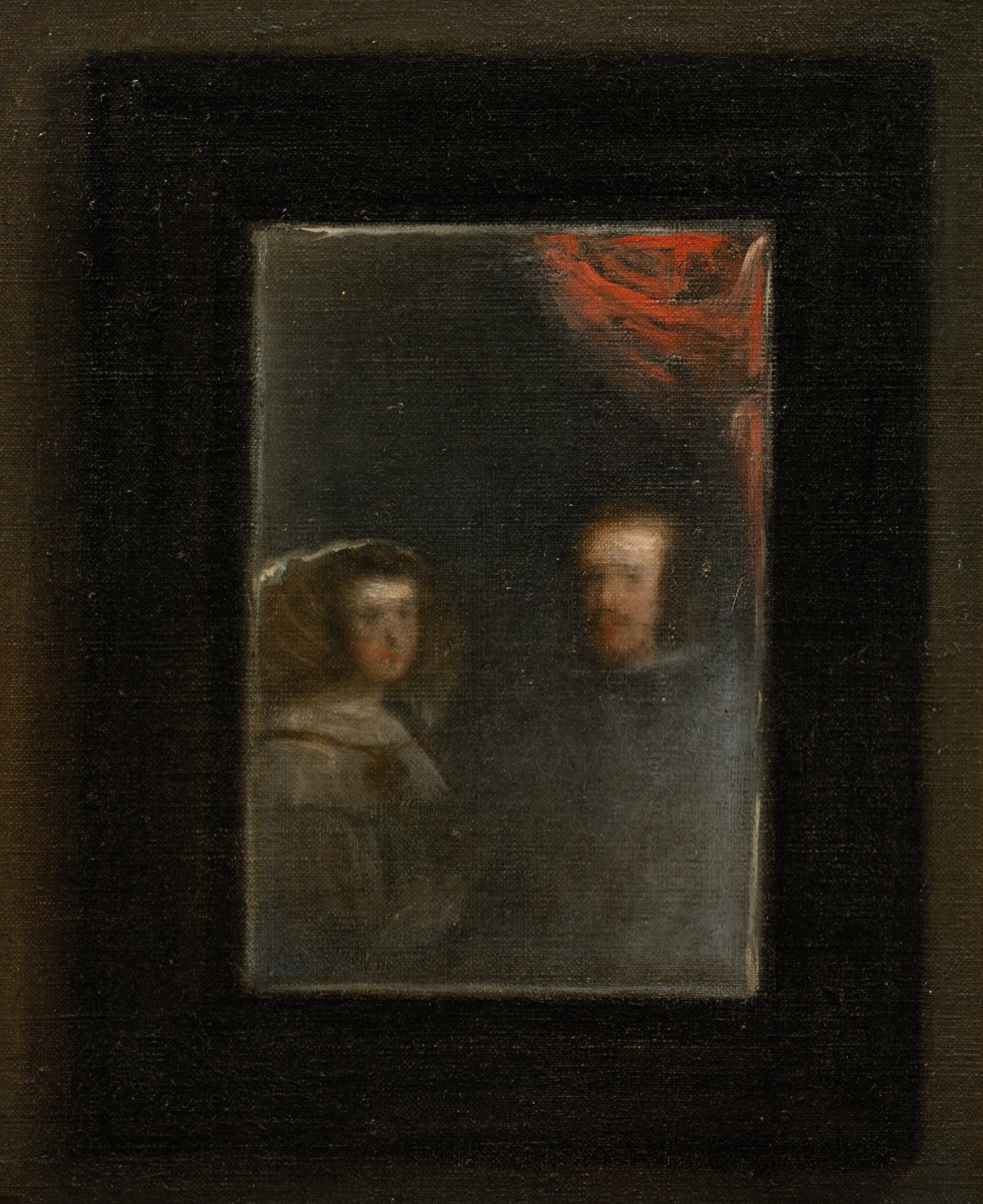
Detail of the mirror hung on the back wall, showing the reflected images of Philip IV and his wife, Mariana of Austria

Of the nine figures depicted, five are looking directly out at the royal couple or the viewer. Their glances, along with the king and queen's reflection, affirm the royal couple's presence outside the painted space. Alternatively, art historians H. W. Janson and Joel Snyder suggest that the image of the king and queen is a reflection from Velázquez's canvas, the front of which is obscured from the viewer. Other writers say the canvas Velázquez is shown working on is unusually large for one of his portraits, and note that it is about the same size as Las Meninas. The painting contains the only known double portrait of the royal couple painted by the artist.

The point of view of the picture is approximately that of the royal couple, though this has been widely debated. Many critics suppose that the scene is viewed by the king and queen as they pose for a double portrait, while the infanta and her companions are present only to make the process more enjoyable. Ernst Gombrich suggested that the picture might have been the sitters' idea:

Perhaps the princess was brought into the royal presence to relieve the boredom of the sitting and the King or the Queen remarked to Velazquez that here was a worthy subject for his brush. The words spoken by the sovereign are always treated as a command, and so we may owe this masterpiece to a passing wish which only Velazquez was able to turn into reality.

No single theory, however, has found universal agreement. Leo Steinberg suggests that the king and queen are to the left of the viewer and the reflection in the mirror is that of the canvas, a portrait of the king and queen. Clark suggests that the work depicts a scene in which the ladies-in-waiting attempt to cajole the Infanta Doña Margarita to pose with her mother and father. In his 1960 book Looking at Pictures, Clark writes:

Our first feeling is of being there. We are standing just to the right of the King and Queen, whose reflections we can see in the distant mirror, looking down an austere room in the Alcázar (hung with del Mazo's copies of Rubens) and watching a familiar situation. The Infanta Doña Margarita doesn't want to pose...She is now five years old, and she has had enough. [It is] an enormous picture, so big that it stands on the floor, in which she is going to appear with her parents; and somehow the Infanta must be persuaded. Her ladies-in-waiting, known by the Portuguese name of meninas... are doing their best to cajole her, and have brought her dwarves, Maribarbola and Nicolasito, to amuse her. But in fact they alarm her almost as much as they alarm us.

The back wall of the room is in shadow and hung with rows of paintings, including one of a series of scenes from Ovid's Metamorphoses by Rubens, and copies, by Velázquez's son-in-law and principal assistant del Mazo, of works by Jacob Jordaens. The paintings are shown in the exact positions recorded in an inventory taken around this time. The wall to the right is hung with a grid of eight smaller paintings, visible mainly as frames owing to their angle from the viewer. They can be identified from the inventory as more Mazo copies of paintings from the Rubens Ovid series, though only two of the subjects can be seen. The paintings are recognized as representing Minerva Punishing Arachne and Apollo's Victory Over Marsyas. Both stories involve Minerva, the goddess of wisdom and patron of the arts. These two legends are both stories of mortals challenging gods and the dreadful consequences. One scholar points out that the legend dealing with two women, Minerva and Arachne, is on the same side of the mirror as the queen's reflection, while the male legend, involving the god Apollo and the satyr Marsyas, is on the side of the king.

=== Composition ===
The painted surface is divided into quarters horizontally and sevenths vertically; this grid is used to organise the elaborate grouping of characters, and was a common device at the time. Velázquez presents nine figures—eleven if the king and queen's reflected images are included—yet they occupy only the lower half of the canvas. According to López-Rey, the painting has three focal points: the Infanta Margaret Theresa, the self-portrait, and the half-length reflected images of King Philip IV and Queen Mariana. In 1960, Clark observed that the success of the composition is a result first and foremost of the accurate handling of light and shade:

Each focal point involves us in a new set of relations; and to paint a complex group like the Meninas, the painter must carry in his head a single consistent scale of relations which he can apply throughout. He may use all kinds of devices to help him do this—perspective is one of them—but ultimately the truth about a complete visual impression depends on one thing, truth of tone. Drawing may be summary, colours drab, but if the relations of tone are true, the picture will hold.

The focal points are widely debated. According to Leo Steinberg, the painting's orthogonals are intentionally disguised so that the picture's focal centre shifts. Similar to Lopez-Rey, he describes three foci. The man in the doorway, however, is the vanishing point. More specifically, the crook of his arm is where the orthogonals of the windows and lights of the ceiling meet.

Depth and dimension are rendered by the use of linear perspective, by the overlapping of the layers of shapes, and in particular, as stated by Clark, through the use of tone. This compositional element operates within the picture in a number of ways. First, there is the appearance of natural light within the painted room and beyond it. The pictorial space in the midground and foreground is lit from two sources: thin shafts of light from the open door and broad streams coming through the window to the right. The 20th-century French philosopher and cultural critic Michel Foucault observed that the light from the window illuminates both the studio foreground and the unrepresented area in front of it, in which the king, the queen, and the viewer are presumed to be situated. For José Ortega y Gasset, light divides the scene into three distinct parts, with foreground and background planes strongly illuminated, between which a darkened intermediate space includes silhouetted figures.

Velázquez uses this light not only to add volume and definition to each form but also to define the focal points. As the light streams from the right, it brightly glints on the braid and golden hair of the female little person, who is nearest the light source. But because her face is turned from the light and into shadow, its tonality does not make it a point of particular interest. Similarly, the light glances obliquely on the cheek of the lady-in-waiting near her, but not on her facial features. Much of her lightly coloured dress is dimmed by shadow. The infanta, however, stands in full illumination, and with her face turned towards the light source, even though her gaze is not. Her face is framed by the pale gossamer of her hair, setting her apart from everything else in the picture. The light models the volumetric geometry of her form, defining the conic nature of a small torso bound rigidly into a corset and stiffened bodice, and the panniered skirt extending around her like an oval candy-box, casting its own deep shadow which, by its sharp contrast with the bright brocade, both emphasises and locates the small figure as the main point of attention.

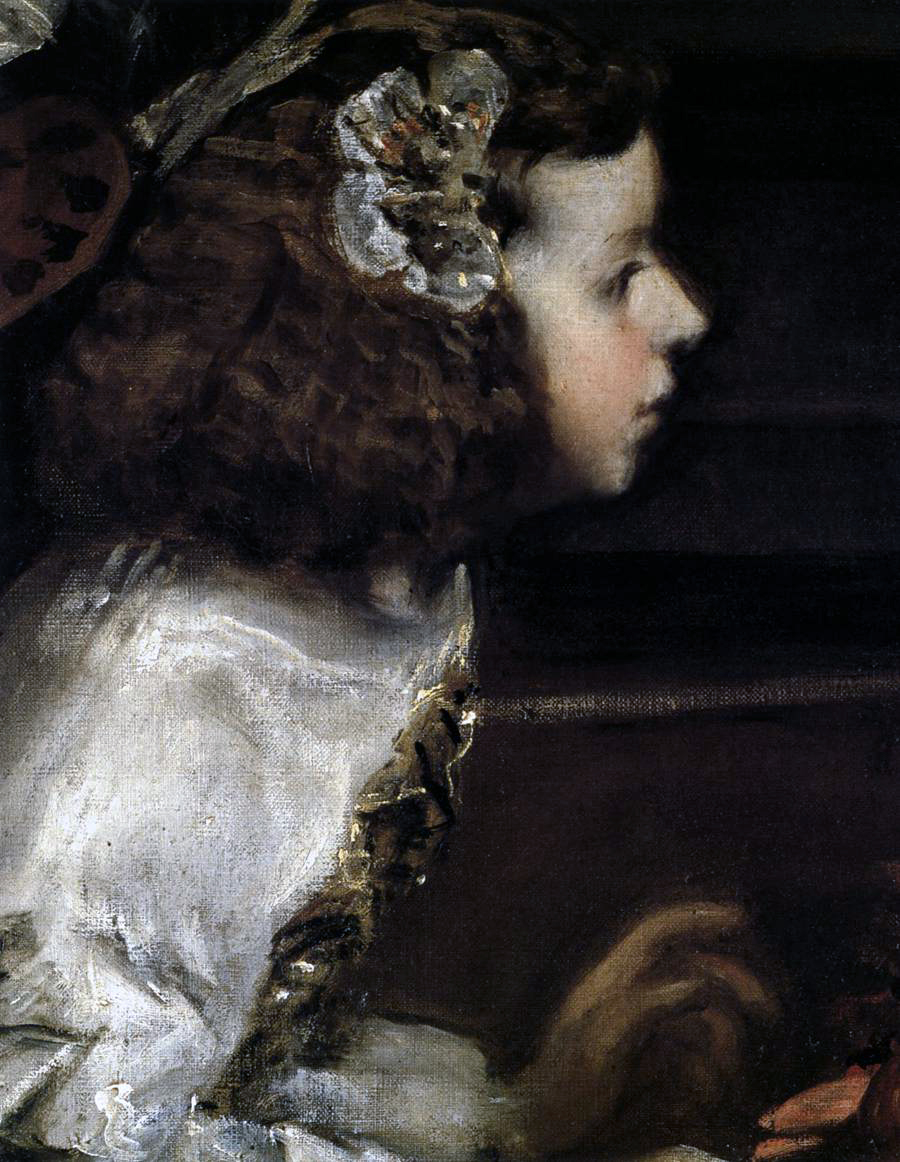
Detail of Doña María de Sotomayor, showing Velázquez's free brushwork on her dress

Velázquez further emphasises the infanta by his positioning and lighting of her maids of honour, who are set opposite one another: before and behind the infanta. The maid on the viewer's left is depicted in a brightly lit profile, while her sleeve forms a diagonal. Her opposite figure creates a broader but less defined reflection of her attention, making a diagonal space between them, in which their charge stands protected. (Note: "The composition is anchored by the two strong diagonals that intersect at about the spot where the Infanta stands ...")

A further internal diagonal passes through the space occupied by the infanta. There is a similar connection between the female little person and the figure of Velázquez himself, both of whom look towards the viewer from similar angles, creating a visual tension. The face of Velázquez is dimly lit by reflected, rather than direct, light. For this reason, his features, though not as sharply defined, are more visible than those of the little person who is much nearer the light source. This appearance of a total face, full-on to the viewer, draws attention, and its importance is marked tonally by the contrasting frame of dark hair, the light on the hand and brush, and the skilfully placed triangle of light on the artist's sleeve, pointing directly to the face.

The mirror is a perfectly defined, unbroken pale rectangle within a broad black rectangle. A clear geometric shape, like a lit face, draws the viewer's attention more than a broken geometric shape such as the door, or a shadowed or oblique face such as that of the little person in the foreground or that of the man in the background. The viewer cannot distinguish the features of the king and queen, but in the opalescent sheen of the mirror's surface, the glowing ovals are plainly turned directly to the viewer. Jonathan Miller pointed out that apart from "adding suggestive gleams at the bevelled edges, the most important way the mirror betrays its identity is by disclosing imagery whose brightness is so inconsistent with the dimness of the surrounding wall that it can only have been borrowed, by reflection, from the strongly illuminated figures of the King and Queen".

As the maids of honour are reflected in each other, so too do the king and queen have their doubles within the painting, in the dimly lit forms of the chaperone and guard, the two who serve and care for their daughter. The positioning of these figures sets up a pattern, one man, a couple, one man, a couple, and while the outer figures are nearer the viewer than the others, they all occupy the same horizontal band on the picture's surface.

Adding to the inner complexities of the picture is the male little person in the foreground, whose raised hand echoes the gesture of the figure in the background, while his playful demeanour and distraction from the central action are in complete contrast with it. The informality of his pose, his shadowed profile, and his dark hair all serve to make him a mirror image of the kneeling attendant of the Infanta. However, the painter has set him forward of the light streaming through the window, and so minimised the contrast of tone on this foreground figure.

Despite certain spatial ambiguities, this is the painter's most thoroughly rendered architectural space, and the only one in which a ceiling is shown. According to López-Rey, in no other composition did Velázquez so dramatically lead the eye to areas beyond the viewer's sight: both the canvas he is seen painting, and the space beyond the frame where the king and queen stand can only be imagined. The bareness of the dark ceiling, the back of Velázquez's canvas, and the strict geometry of framed paintings contrast with the animated, brilliantly lit and sumptuously painted foreground entourage. Stone writes:

We cannot take in all the figures of the painting in one glance. Not only do the life-size proportions of the painting preclude such an appreciation, but also the fact that the heads of the figures are turned in different directions means that our gaze is deflected. The painting communicates through images which, to be understood, must thus be considered in sequence, one after the other, in the context of a history that is still unfolding. It is a history that is still unframed, even in this painting composed of frames within frames.

According to Kahr, the composition could have been influenced by the traditional Dutch Gallery Pictures such as those by Frans Francken the Younger, Willem van Haecht, or David Teniers the Younger. Teniers' work was owned by Philip IV and would have been known by Velázquez. Like Las Meninas, they often depict formal visits by important collectors or rulers, a common occurrence, and "show a room with a series of windows dominating one side wall and paintings hung between the windows as well as on the other walls". Gallery Portraits were also used to glorify the artist as well as royalty or members of the higher classes, as may have been Velázquez's intention with this work

=== Mirror and reflection ===
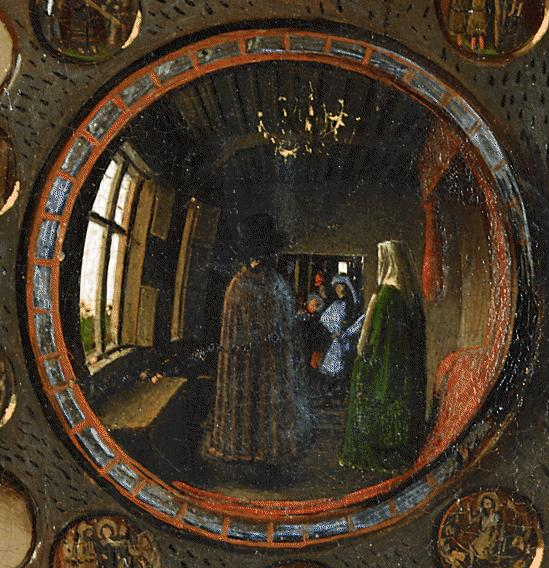
Detail of the mirror in van Eyck's Arnolfini Portrait. Van Eyck's painting shows the pictorial space from "behind", and two further figures in front of the picture space, like those in the reflection in the mirror in Las Meninas.

The spatial structure and positioning of the mirror's reflection are such that Philip IV and Mariana appear to be standing on the viewer's side of the pictorial space, facing the infanta and her entourage. According to Janson, not only is the gathering of figures in the foreground for Philip and Mariana's benefit, but the painter's attention is concentrated on the couple, as he appears to be working on their portrait. Although they can only be seen in the mirror reflection, their distant image occupies a central position in the canvas, in terms of social hierarchy as well as composition. As spectators, the viewer's position in relation to the painting is uncertain. It has been debated whether the ruling couple are standing beside the viewer or have replaced the viewer, who sees the scene through their eyes. Lending weight to the latter idea are the gazes of three of the figures—Velázquez, the infanta, and Maribarbola—who appear to be looking directly at the viewer.

The mirror on the back wall indicates what is not there: the king and queen, and in the words of Harriet Stone, "the generations of spectators who assume the couple's place before the painting". Writing in 1980, the critics Joel Snyder and Ted Cohen observed:

Velázquez wanted the mirror to depend upon the useable [sic] painted canvas for its image. Why should he want that? The luminous image in the mirror appears to reflect the king and queen themselves, but it does more than just this: the mirror outdoes nature. The mirror image is only a reflection. A reflection of what? Of the real thing—of the art of Velázquez. In the presence of his divinely ordained monarchs ... Velázquez exults in his artistry and counsels Philip and Maria not to look for the revelation of their image in the natural reflection of a looking glass but rather in the penetrating vision of their master painter. In the presence of Velázquez, a mirror image is a poor imitation of the real.

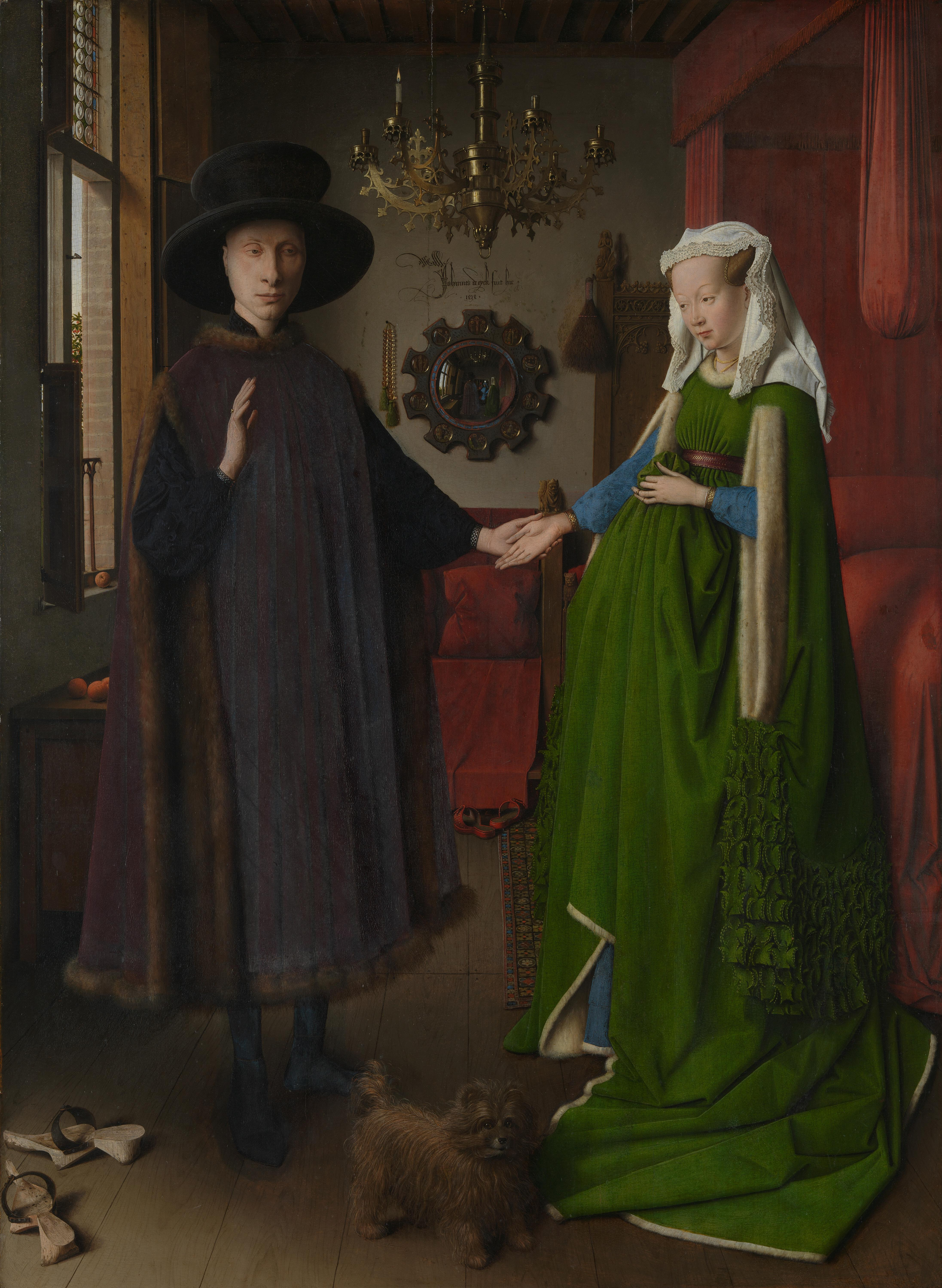
In the Arnolfini Portrait (1434), Jan van Eyck uses an image reflected in a mirror in a manner similar to Velázquez in Las Meninas.

In Las Meninas, the king and queen are supposedly "outside" the painting, yet their reflection in the back wall mirror also places them "inside" the pictorial space. Snyder proposes that the painting is "a mirror of majesty" or an allusion to the mirror for princes. While it is a literal reflection of the king and queen, Snyder writes "it is the image of exemplary monarchs, a reflection of ideal character". Later he focuses his attention on the princess, writing that Velázquez's portrait is "the painted equivalent of a manual for the education of the princess—a mirror of the princess".

The painting was likely influenced by Jan van Eyck's Arnolfini Portrait, of 1434. At the time, van Eyck's painting hung in Philip's palace, and would have been familiar to Velázquez. The Arnolfini Portrait also has a mirror positioned at the back of the pictorial space, reflecting two figures who would have the same angle of vision as does the viewer of Velázquez's painting; they are too small to identify, but it has been speculated that one may be intended as the artist himself, though he is not shown in the act of painting. According to Lucien Dällenbach:

The mirror [in Las Meninas] faces the observer as in Van Eyck's painting. But here the procedure is more realistic to the degree that the "rearview" mirror in which the royal couple appears is no longer convex but flat. Whereas the reflection in the Flemish painting recomposed objects and characters within a space that is condensed and deformed by the curve of the mirror, that of Velázquez refuses to play with the laws of perspective: it projects onto the canvas the perfect double of the king and queen positioned in front of the painting.

== Interpretation ==
The elusiveness of Las Meninas, according to Dawson Carr, "suggests that art, and life, are an illusion". The relationship between illusion and reality was a central concern in Spanish culture during the 17th century, figuring largely in Don Quixote, the best-known work of Spanish Baroque literature. In this respect, Calderón de la Barca's play Life is a Dream is commonly seen as the literary equivalent of Velázquez's painting:

What is a life? A frenzy. What is life?
A shadow, an illusion, and a sham.
The greatest good is small; all life, it seems
Is just a dream, and even dreams are dreams.

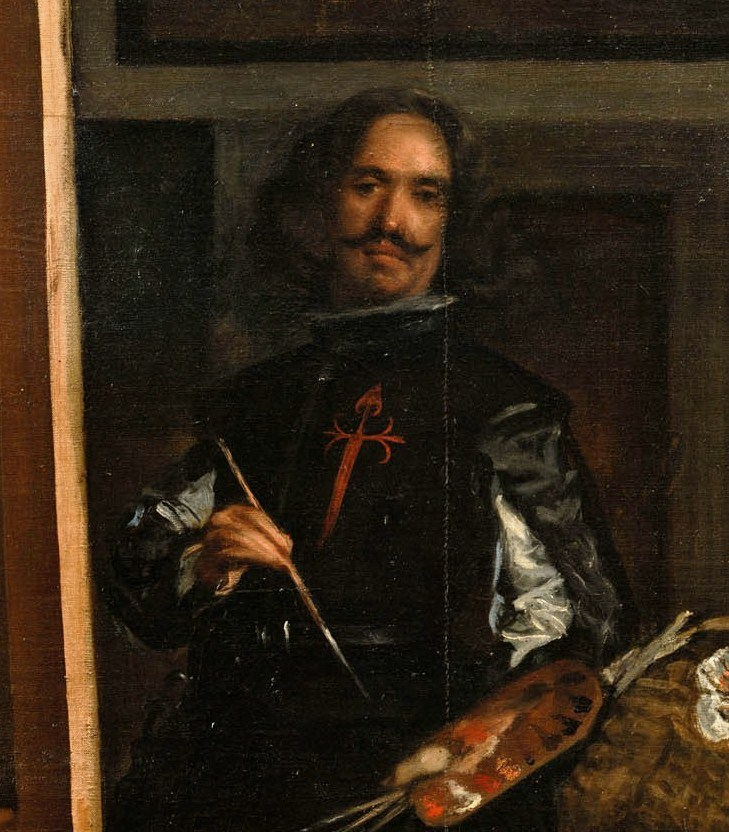
Detail showing the red cross of the Order of Santiago painted on the breast of Velázquez. Presumably this detail was added at a later date, as the painter was admitted to the order by the king's decree on 28 November 1659.

Jon Manchip White notes that the painting can be seen as a résumé of the whole of Velázquez's life and career, as well as a summary of his art to that point. He placed his only confirmed self-portrait in a room in the royal palace surrounded by an assembly of royalty, courtiers, and fine objects that represent his life at court. The art historian Svetlana Alpers suggests that, by portraying the artist at work in the company of royalty and nobility, Velázquez was claiming high status for both the artist and his art, and in particular to propose that painting is a liberal rather than a mechanical art. This distinction was a point of controversy at the time. It would have been significant to Velázquez, since the rules of the Order of Santiago excluded those whose occupations were mechanical. Kahr asserts that this was the best way for Velázquez to show that he was "neither a craftsman or a tradesman, but an official of the court". Furthermore, this was a way to prove himself worthy of acceptance by the royal family.

Michel Foucault devoted the opening chapter of The Order of Things (1996) to an analysis of Las Meninas. Foucault describes the painting in meticulous detail, but in a language that is "neither prescribed by, nor filtered through the various texts of art-historical investigation". Foucault viewed the painting without regard to the subject matter, nor to the artist's biography, technical ability, sources and influences, social context, or relationship with his patrons. Instead, he analyses its conscious artifice, highlighting the complex network of visual relationships between painter, subject-model, and viewer:

We are looking at a picture in which the painter is in turn looking out at us. A mere confrontation, eyes catching one another's glance, direct looks superimposing themselves upon one another as they cross. And yet this slender line of reciprocal visibility embraces a whole complex network of uncertainties, exchanges, and feints. The painter is turning his eyes towards us only in so far as we happen to occupy the same position as his subject.

For Foucault, Las Meninas illustrates the first signs of a new episteme, or way of thinking. It represents a midpoint between what he sees as the two "great discontinuities" in European thought, the classical and the modern: "Perhaps there exists, in this painting by Velázquez, the representation as it were of Classical representation, and the definition of the space it opens up to us ... representation, freed finally from the relation that was impeding it, can offer itself as representation in its pure form."

Now he (the painter) can be seen, caught in a moment of stillness, at the neutral centre of his oscillation. His dark torso and bright face are half-way between the visible and the invisible: emerging from the canvas beyond our view, he moves into our gaze; but when, in a moment, he makes a step to the right, removing himself from our gaze, he will be standing exactly in front of the canvas he is painting; he will enter that region where his painting, neglected for an instant, will, for him, become visible once more, free of shadow and free of reticence. As though the painter could not at the same time be seen on the picture where he is represented and also see that upon which he is representing something."

In his 2015 analysis, Xavier d'Hérouville brings the painting closer to its first name, namely "The Family of Philippe IV", which at the time earned it the term "theology of painting" by Luca Giordano, a contemporary painter of Velázquez. Through this representation, the painter would have conceptualised the divine view of his creation. When the spectator places himself in front of the canvas, in place of the king's study for which this painting was very exclusively intended, he finds himself instantly invested with the divine power, that of "seeing without being seen" in the Family of Philip IV. The interface that constitutes this canvas must therefore be considered as a "one-way mirror" in which each of the protagonists of this representation looks at themselves, and behind which the monarch invests divine power, and his wife, can at leisure and in complete discretion contemplate their life's work, their "Family", in the broadest sense of the term. Further still, this canvas can be seen not only as a summary of the state of advancement of his art at the time of painting, but also as a curriculum vitæ of Velázquez's life and career. The latter having gone so far as to represent himself in this "fresco" at three key periods of his own existence within the Court of Spain: in the background and to the left, as the king's painter, then to the right this time, at the very heart of the Family of Philip IV, alongside the governess, as valet of the king's bedroom, and finally at the back and in the center, camped on the stairs, as Aposentador or Marshal of the Palace, the supreme function he exercised as the king's best friend and confidant.

== Las Meninas as culmination of themes in Velázquez ==
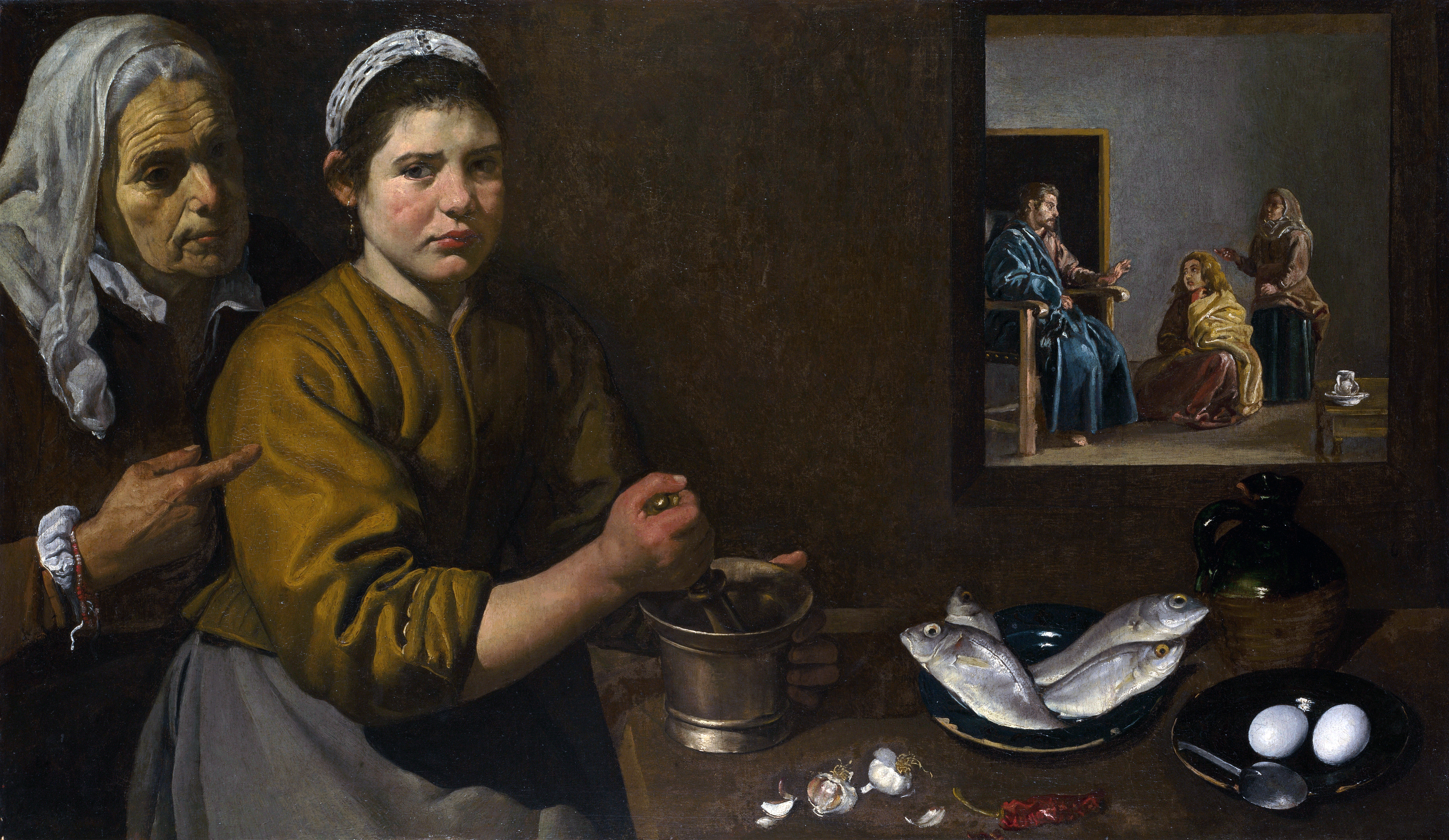
Velázquez's Christ in the House of Martha and Mary, 1618. The smaller image may be a view to another room, a picture on the wall, or a reflection in a mirror.

Many aspects of Las Meninas relate to earlier works by Velázquez in which he plays with conventions of representation. In the Rokeby Venus—his only surviving nude—the face of the subject is visible, blurred beyond any realism, in a mirror. The angle of the mirror is such that although "often described as looking at herself, [she] is more disconcertingly looking at us". In the early Christ in the House of Martha and Mary of 1618, (Note: According to López-Rey, "[The Arnolfini Portrait] has little in common with Velázquez' composition, the closest and most meaningful antecedent to which is to be found within his own oeuvre in Christ in the House of Martha and Mary, painted almost forty years earlier, in Seville, before he could have seen the Arnolfini portrait in Madrid".) Christ and his companions are seen only through a serving hatch to a room behind, according to the National Gallery (London), who are clear that this is the intention, although before restoration many art historians regarded this scene as either a painting hanging on the wall in the main scene, or a reflection in a mirror, and the debate has continued. (Note: The restoration was in 1964, and removed earlier "clumsy repainting".) (Note: Jonathan Miller, for example, in 1998, continued to regard the inset picture as a reflection in a mirror.) The dress worn in the two scenes also differs: the main scene is in contemporary dress, while the scene with Christ uses conventional iconographic biblical dress.

In Las Hilanderas, believed to have been painted the year after Las Meninas, two different scenes from Ovid are shown: one in contemporary dress in the foreground, and the other partly in antique dress, played before a tapestry on the back wall of a room behind the first. According to the critic Sira Dambe, "aspects of representation and power are addressed in this painting in ways closely connected with their treatment in Las Meninas". In a series of portraits of the late 1630s and 1640s—all now in the Prado—Velázquez painted clowns and other members of the royal household posing as gods, heroes, and philosophers; the intention is certainly partly comic, at least for those in the know, but in a highly ambiguous way.

== Influence ==
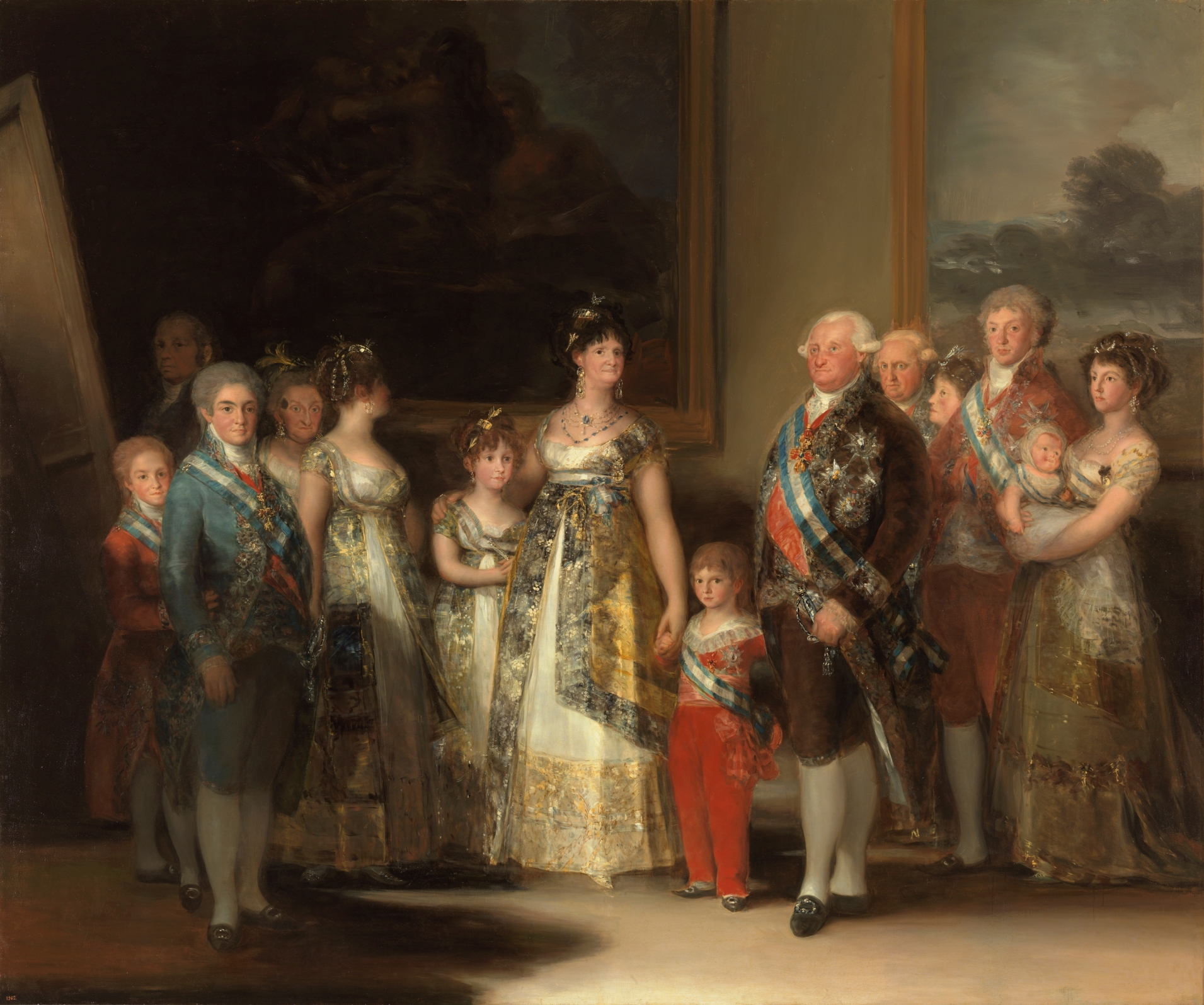
Francisco Goya's Charles IV of Spain and His Family references Las Meninas, but is less sympathetic towards its subjects.

An almost immediate influence can be seen in the two portraits by del Mazo of subjects depicted in Las Meninas, which in some ways reverse the motif of that painting. Ten years later, in 1666, Mazo painted Infanta Margaret Theresa, who was then 15 and just about to leave Madrid to marry the Holy Roman Emperor. In the background are figures in two further receding doorways, one of which was the new King Charles (Margaret Theresa's brother), and another the little person Maribarbola. A Mazo portrait of the widowed Queen Mariana again shows, through a doorway in the Alcázar, the young king with little people, possibly including Maribarbola, and attendants who offer him a drink. Mazo's painting of The Family of the Artist also shows a composition similar to that of Las Meninas.

In 1692, Luca Giordano became one of the few allowed to view paintings in Philip IV's private apartments, and was greatly impressed by Las Meninas. Giordano described the work as the "theology of painting", and was inspired to paint A Homage to Velázquez, which is now in the National Gallery, London. Francisco Goya etched a print of Las Meninas in 1778, and used Velázquez's painting as the model for his Charles IV of Spain and His Family. As in Las Meninas, the royal family in Goya's work is apparently visiting the artist's studio. In both paintings, the artist is shown working on a canvas, of which only the rear is visible. Goya, however, replaces the atmospheric and warm perspective of Las Meninas with what Pierre Gassier calls a sense of "imminent suffocation". Goya's royal family is presented on a "stage facing the public, while in the shadow of the wings the painter, with a grim smile, points and says: 'Look at them and judge for yourself!' "

By the early 18th century his oeuvre was gaining international recognition, and later in the century British collectors ventured to Spain in search of acquisitions. Since the popularity of Italian art was then at its height among British connoisseurs, they concentrated on paintings that showed obvious Italian influence, largely ignoring others such as Las Meninas. The 19th-century British art collector William John Bankes travelled to Spain during the Peninsular War (1808–1814) and acquired a copy of Las Meninas painted by Mazo, which he believed to be an original preparatory oil sketch by Velázquez—although Velázquez did not usually paint studies. Bankes described his purchase as "the glory of my collection", noting that he had been "a long while in treaty for it and was obliged to pay a high price".

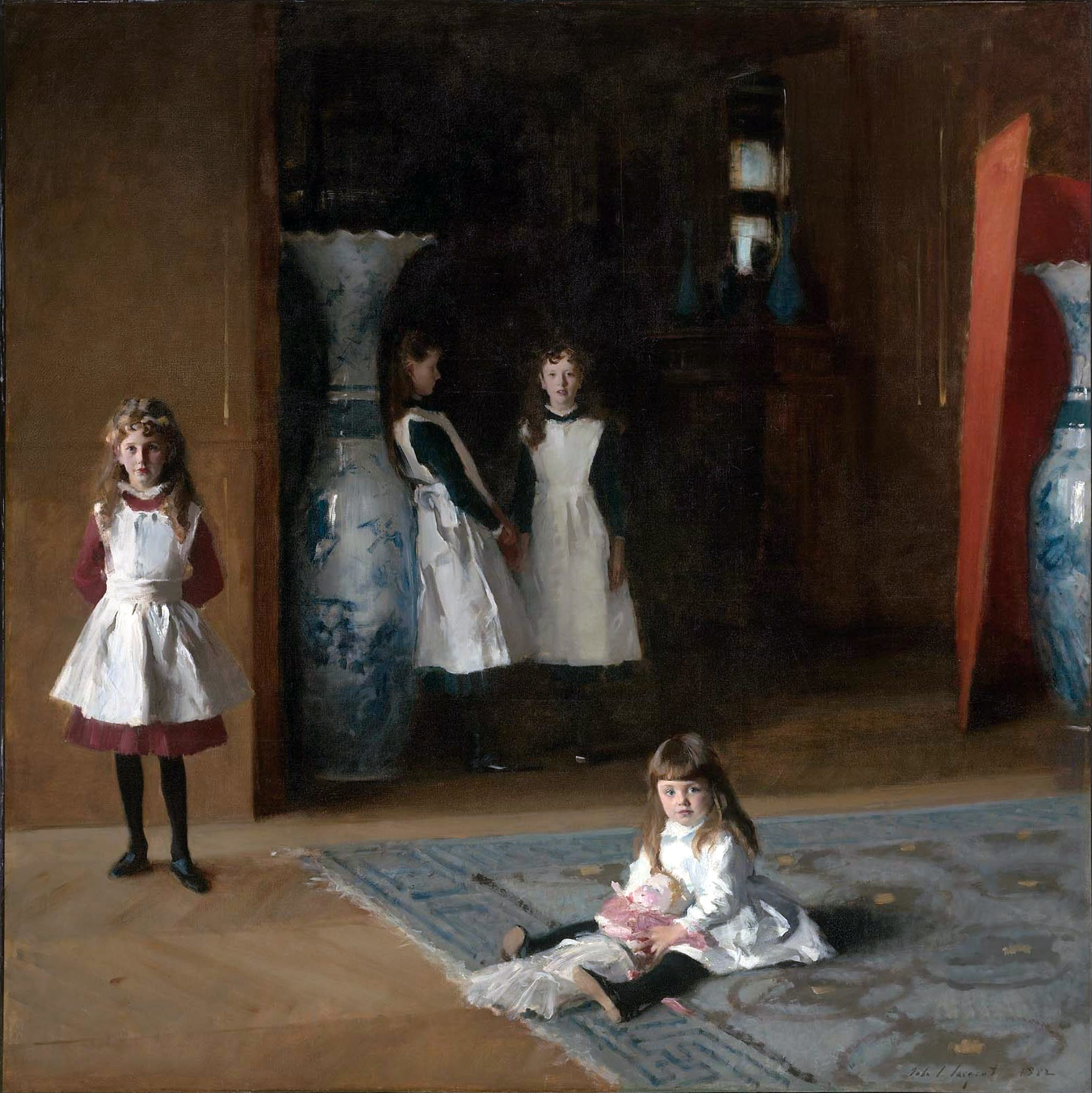
John Singer Sargent, The Daughters of Edward Darley Boit, 1882, Boston Museum of Fine Arts

An appreciation for Velázquez's less Italianate paintings developed after 1819, when Ferdinand VII opened the royal collection to the public. In 1879 John Singer Sargent painted a small-scale copy of Las Meninas, while his 1882 painting The Daughters of Edward Darley Boit is a homage to Velázquez's canvas. The Irish artist Sir John Lavery chose Velázquez's masterpiece as the basis for his 1913 portrait The Royal Family at Buckingham Palace. George V visited Lavery's studio during the execution of the painting and, perhaps recalling the legend that Philip IV had daubed the cross of the Knights of Santiago on the figure of Velázquez, asked Lavery if he could contribute to the portrait with his own hand. According to Lavery, "thinking that royal blue might be an appropriate colour, I mixed it on the palette, and taking a brush he [George V] applied it to the Garter ribbon."

Between August and December 1957, Pablo Picasso painted a series of 58 interpretations of Las Meninas and related figures, which currently fill the Las Meninas room of the Museu Picasso in Barcelona, Spain. Picasso did not vary the characters within the series, but largely retained the naturalness of the scene; according to the museum, his works constitute an "exhaustive study of form, rhythm, colour and movement".

== See also ==
- List of works by Diego Velázquez

== Sources ==
- Alpers, Svetlana (2005). The Vexations of art: Velázquez and others. New Haven: Yale University Press. ISBN 978-0-300-10825-5.
- Beaujean, Dieter (2001). Velasquez. London: Konemann. p. 90. ISBN 978-3-8290-5865-0.
- Brady, Xavier (2006). Velázquez and Britain. New Haven: Yale University Press. ISBN 978-1-85709-303-2.
- Campbell, Lorne (1998). The Fifteenth Century Netherlandish Paintings. London: National Gallery Catalogues (new series). p. 180. ISBN 978-1-85709-171-7.
- Canaday, John (1972) [1969]. "Baroque Painters". The Lives of the Painters. New York: Norton Library. ISBN 978-0-393-00665-0.
- Carr, Dawson W. (2006). "Painting and Reality: The Art and Life of Velázquez". In Carr, Dawson W.; Bray, Xavier (eds.). Velázquez. London: National Gallery. ISBN 978-1-85709-303-2.
- Clark, Kenneth (1960). Looking at Pictures (1961 reprint ed.). New York: Holt Rinehart and Winston. LCCN 60-10106. OCLC 1036517825. ISBN 978-0-7195-0232-3 (later reprint)
- Dällenbach, Lucien (1977). Le récit spéculaire: Essai sur la mise en abyme. Paris: Seuil. p. 21. ISBN 978-2-0200-4556-8.
- Dambe, Sira (December 2006). "Enslaved sovereign: aesthetics of power in Foucault, Velázquez and Ovid". Journal of Literary Studies. 22 (3–4): 229–256. doi:10.1080/02564710608530402. S2CID 143516350.
- d'Hérouville, Xavier (2015). Les Ménines ou l'art conceptuel de Diego Vélasquez (in French). L'Harmattan, collection Ouverture philosophique, série Esthétique. ISBN 978-2-343-07070-4.
- Editorial (January 1985). "The cleaning of 'Las Meninas'". The Burlington Magazine. 127 (982). Burlington Magazine Publications Ltd: 2–3, 41. JSTOR 881920.
- Foucault, Michel (1996). The Order of Things: An Archaeology of the Human Sciences. Paris: Gallimard. ISBN 978-0679-75335-3.
- Gaggi, Silvio (1989). Modern/Postmodern: A Study in Twentieth-century Arts and Ideas. Philadelphia: University of Pennsylvania Press. ISBN 978-0-8122-1384-3.
- Gassier, Pierre (1995). Goya: Biographical and Critical Study. New York: Skira. ISBN 978-0-7581-3747-0. Archived from the original on 27 February 2008.
- Gresle, Yvette (6 July 2007). "Foucault's 'Las Meninas' and Art-Historical Methods". Journal of Literary Studies. 22 (3–4). Taylor & Francis: 211–228. doi:10.1080/02564710608530401. S2CID 145488454.
- Greub, Thierry (2015). "Der Platz des Bildes und der »Platz des Königs«: Diego Velázquez' 'Las Meninas' Im Sommer-Arbeitszimmer Philipps IV". Zeitschrift für Kunstgeschichte. 78 (3/4): 441–487. JSTOR 24857047.
- Harris, E (1990). Velázquez y Gran Bretana. Seville: Symposium Internacional Velázquez. p. 127.
- Honour, Hugh; Fleming, John (1982). A World History of Art. London: Macmillan. ISBN 978-1-85669-451-3.
- Janson, H. W. (1977). History of Art: A Survey of the Major Visual Arts from the Dawn of History to the Present Day (2nd ed.). New Jersey: Prentice-Hall. p. 433. ISBN 978-0-13-389296-3.
- Kahr, Madlyn Millner (June 1975). "Velazquez and Las Meninas". The Art Bulletin. 57 (2). College Art Association: 225–246. doi:10.2307/3049372. JSTOR 3049372.
- Kubler, George (1966). "Three Remarks on the Meninas". The Art Bulletin. 48 (2): 212–214. doi:10.2307/3048367. JSTOR 3048367.
- Levey, Michael (1971). Painting at Court. London: Weidenfeld & Nicolson. p. 147. ISBN 978-0-8147-4950-0.
- López-Rey, José (1999). Velázquez: Catalogue Raisonné. Cologne: Taschen. ISBN 978-3-8228-8277-1.
- Lowrie, Joyce (1999). "Barbey D'Aurevilly's Une Page D'Histoire: A poetics of incest". Romanic Review. 90 (2).
- MacLaren, Neil (1970). The Spanish School, National Gallery Catalogues. Revised by Allan Braham. London: National Gallery. ISBN 978-0-947645-46-5.
- McKim-Smith, G.; Andersen-Bergdoll, G.; Newman, R. (1988). Examining Velazquez. New Haven: Yale University Press. ISBN 978-0-300-03615-2.
- Miller, Jonathan (1998). On Reflection. London: National Gallery Publications Limited. ISBN 978-0-300-07713-1.
- Museo del Prado (1996). Museo del Prado, Catálogo de las pinturas [Prado Museum, Catalog of paintings] (in Spanish). Madrid: Ministerio de Educación y Cultura, Madrid. ISBN 978-84-7483-410-9.
- Ortega y Gasset, José (1953). Velázquez. New York: Random House. p. XLVII.
- Palomino, Antonio (1715–1724). El museo pictorico y escala optica [The pictorial museum and optical scale] (in Spanish). Vol. 2. Madrid. Archived from the original on 24 March 2021.
- Rafart i Planas, Claustre (2001). Picasso's Las Meninas. Translated by Collins, Valerie. Barcelona: Editorial Meteora. ISBN 978-84-95623-15-7.
- Snyder, Joel (June 1985). "Las Meninas and the Mirror of Prices". Critical Inquiry. 11 (4). The University of Chicago Press: 539–572. doi:10.1086/448307. JSTOR 1343417. S2CID 162111194.
- Snyder, Joel; Cohen, Ted (June 1980). "Reflexions on Las Meninas: paradox los". Critical Inquiry. 7 (2). The University of Chicago Press. doi:10.1086/448307.
- Steinberg, Leo (Winter 1981). "Velázquez' Las Meninas". October. 19. The MIT Press: 45–54. doi:10.2307/778659. JSTOR 778659.
- Stone, Harriet (1996). The Classical Model: Literature and Knowledge in Seventeenth-Century France. Ithaca: Cornell University Press. ISBN 978-0-8014-3212-5.
- White, Jon Manchip (1969). Diego Velázquez: Painter and Courtier. London: Hamish Hamilton Ltd. ISBN 978-0241-0-1624-4.
- Zeri, Federico (1990). Behind the Image, the art of reading paintings. London: Heinemann. ISBN 978-0-4348-9688-2.
