= Portrait of Philip IV in Fraga =

1644 painting by Velázquez

- Felipe IV en Fraga (Spanish)
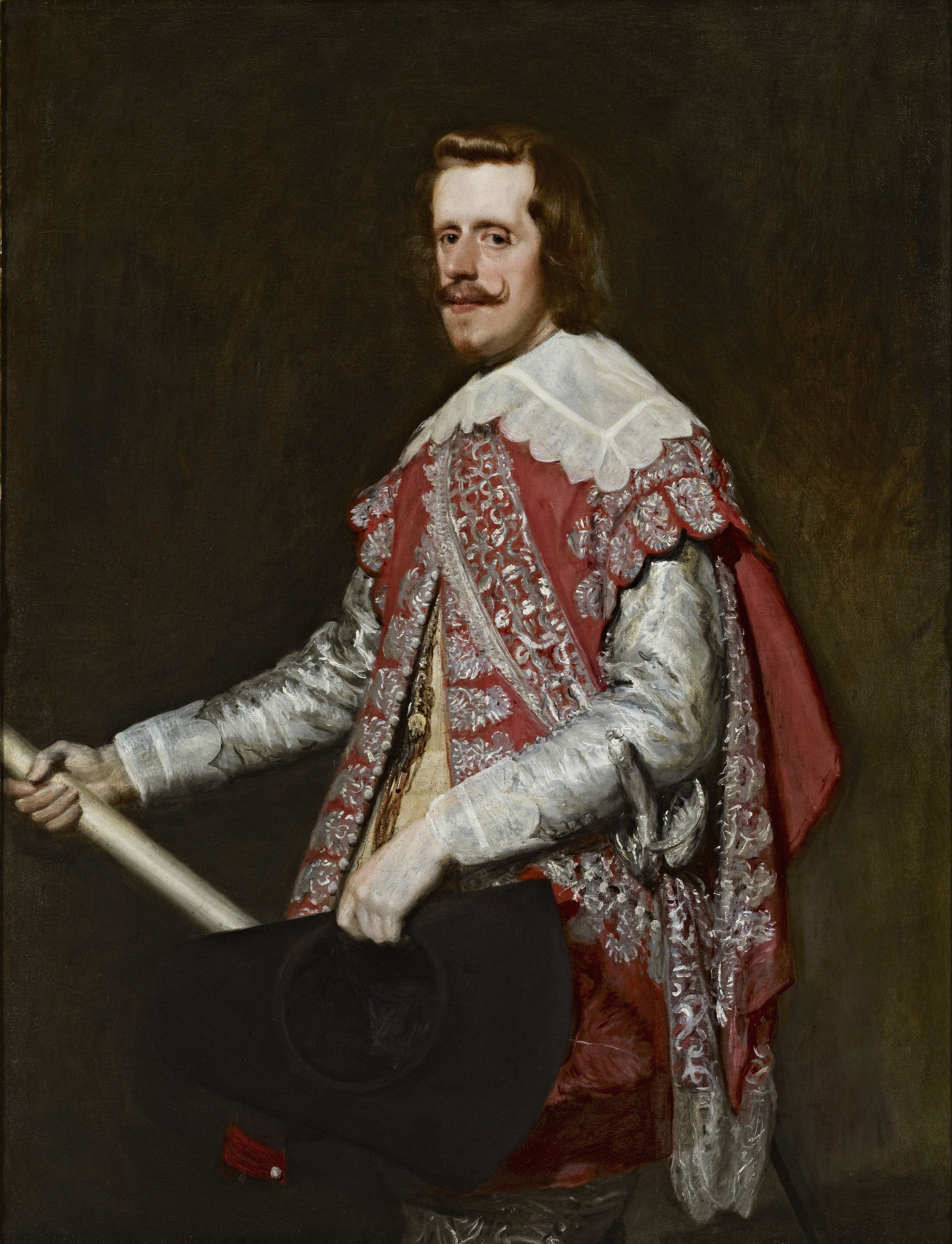
- Artist: Diego Velázquez
- Year: 1644
- Medium: Oil on canvas
- Dimensions: 129.8 cm × 99.4 cm (51.1 in × 39.1 in)
- Location: Frick Collection; New York City

The Portrait of Philip IV in Fraga is a mid-length portrait of Philip IV of Spain by Diego Velázquez. It was painted over the course of three sessions in June 1644 in Fraga, where Philip IV had moved the royal court as part of the "Jornada de Aragón" which resulted in the recovery of Lérida from France, which had occupied the city earlier during the Reapers' War. The portrait was gifted by Philip V to his son, the future Philip, Duke of Parma, and the painting left Spain along with him in 1748. In 1911 it was acquired by the Frick Collection, where it is currently on display.

This is almost certainly the same painting which Antonio Palomino said Velázquez painted of the king in a natural manner "in the way he entered Lérida, wielding a military staff, and dressed in crimson plush, with such a beautiful air, so much grace, and majesty, that the painting looked like another living Philip".

Much is known of the circumstances surrounding the painting of the portrait due to extant expense accounts, including masonry costs related to the creation of two windows in the throne room where the king was to pose, as well as expenses related to the renovation of the facilities that Velázquez used as a studio, which had been in a ruinous state. At the same time he worked on this painting, he worked on another painting, one of the court dwarf Diego de Acedo, known as El Primo, which was sent to Madrid in June. The painting appears to have been different than the painting of Sebatian De Morra, which is currently at the Prado.

The painting was finished before the end of June, and was sent to Philip IV's wife Elisabeth, who ordered its public exhibition. José Pellicer in his Avisos históricos noted that on August 16, 1644 that a painting of the king portrayed "in the same way that he is in the field", dressed in red and silver, had been exhibited in the church of San Martín, "under a canopy embroidered with gold, where many people came to see it and copies are being made of it".

Jonathan Brown suggests that Velázquez's composition might have been inspired by Anthony van Dyck's, Cardinal-Infante Ferdinand of Austria, which had been in Madrid since 1636.

Among the known copies, the most esteemed is held in the Dulwich College of London, which had previously mistakenly been considered Velasquez's original, before it was attributed to Juan Bautista Martínez del Mazo in 1911 by Aureliano de Beruete, leading to the copy in New York being identified as the original.

== In popular culture ==
The painting (most likely a copy) appears in the 1941 film, The Maltese Falcon.

== See also ==
- List of works by Diego Velázquez

== Bibliography ==
- Brown, Jonathan (1986). Velázquez. Pintor y cortesano. Madrid: Alianza Editorial. ISBN 84-206-9031-7.
- Corpus velazqueño (2000). Corpus velazqueño. Documentos y textos, 2 vols., bajo la dirección de J. M. Pita Andrade. Madrid. ISBN 84-369-3347-8.
- López-Rey, José (1996). Velázquez. Catalogue raisonné, vol. II. Colonia: Taschen Wildenstein Institute. ISBN 3-8228-8731-5.
- Palomino, Antonio (1988). El museo pictórico y escala óptica III. El parnaso español pintoresco laureado. Madrid : Aguilar S.A. de Ediciones. ISBN 84-03-88005-7.
