= Pallas and Arachne =

1636-37 painting by Peter Paul Rubens

- Pallas und Arachne (German)
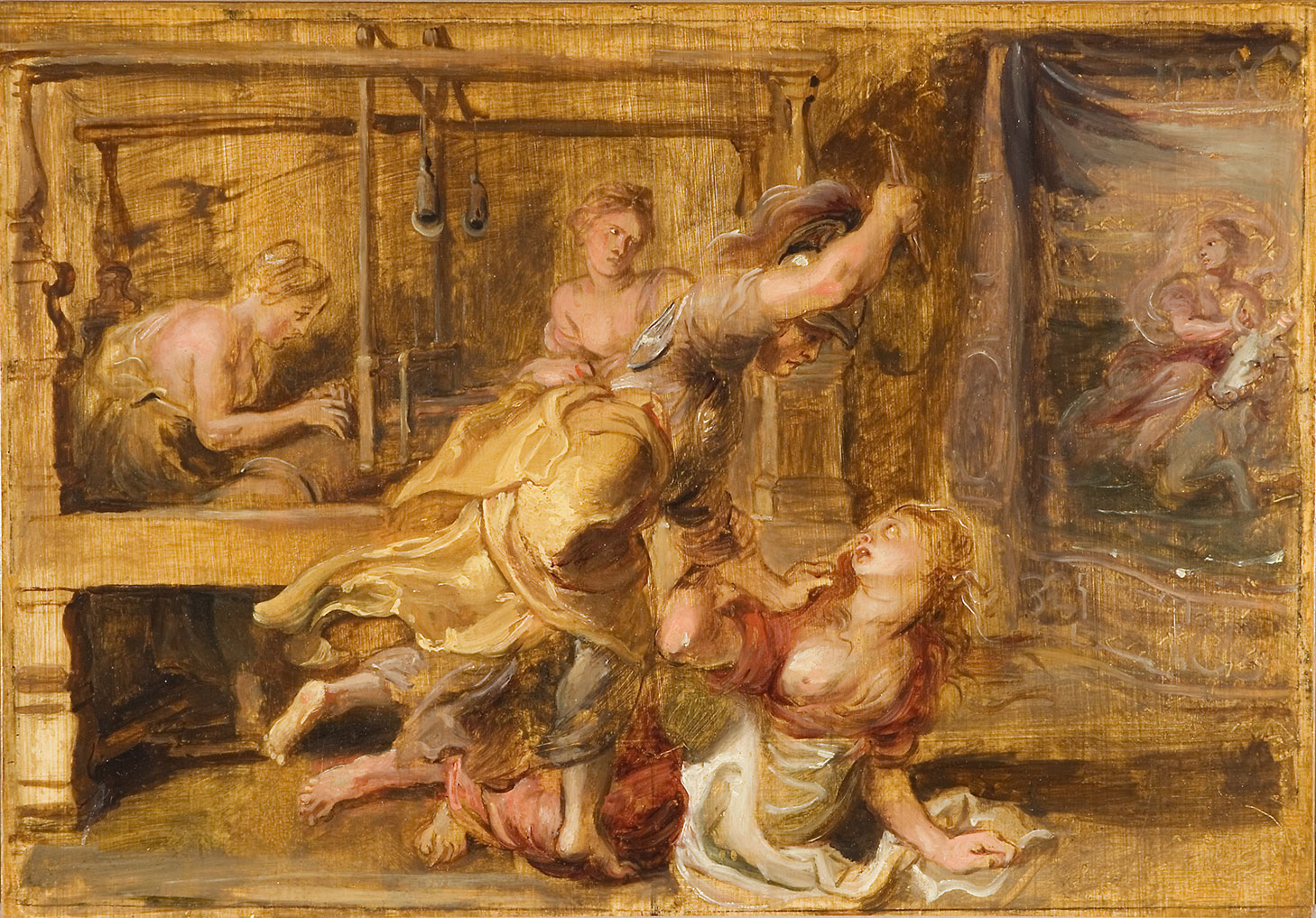
- Artist: Peter Paul Rubens
- Year: 1636-37
- Medium: Oil on wood
- Movement: Flemish Baroque
- Dimensions: 26.67 cm × 38.1 cm (10.50 in × 15.0 in)
- Location: Virginia Museum of Fine Arts, Richmond, Virginia
- Owner: Collection of the Duke of Infantado; Collection of the Duc de Pastrana; Collection of the Duc d'Osuna; Collection of Michel van Galder; Newhouse Galleries by 1958; Virginia Museum of Fine Arts, 1958-present
- Accession: Accessioned May 14, 1958
- Website: www.vmfa.museum/piction/6027262-8059131/

Pallas and Arachne (German: Pallas und Arachne), also known as Minerva Punishing Arachne and occasionally referred to as Arachne Punished by Pallas, is an oil-on-board oil study by the Flemish artist Peter Paul Rubens completed in 1636 or 1637.

It was a study for one of the series of paintings Rubens and his workshop painted for the Torre de la Parada, which is now lost.

== Description ==
The painting depicts the story from Ovid's Metamorphoses of the weaving contest between the god Athena and the mortal Arachne. In the original myth, Athena challenges Arachne and loses, but Athena punishes Arachne anyway for insulting the gods by not recognizing the divine source of Athena's artistic skill and for creating a more beautiful work than her own.

In the background of the canvas hangs a partially visible tapestry of Titian's The Rape of Europa which, according to Ovid's version of the story, was the theme of the tapestry woven by Arachne during the contest with Athena.

== Influence ==
Rubens's Pallas and Arachne was copied by Juan Bautista Martínez del Mazo, the Spanish Baroque painter and son-in-law of Diego Velázquez. Velázquez positioned Mazo's copy of Pallas and Arachne behind him during his composition of Las Meninas, which he paired with another painting about different contest of the arts between gods and mortals (Apollo as Victor over Pan). The copy of Pallas and Arachne was then painted into the background of the scene in Las Meninas, which would go on to be one of the most recognized and analyzed canvases in the history of western art.

A copy by Rubens of Velázquez's favorite work, Titian's The Rape of Europa, was owned by The Royal Collection of Philip IV. The work can be seen in the background of Pallas and Arachne, which in turn can be seen in the background of Las Meninas.
