= Nicolás Pertusato =

Italian court dwarf at the Spanish court (c. 1635–1710)

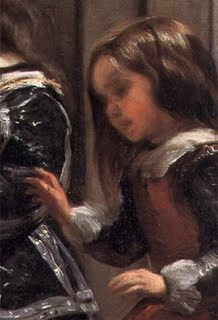
Detail of Velázquez's Las Meninas, showing Nicolás Pertusato

Nicolás Pertusato, also known as Nicola Pertusato and Nicolasito Pertusato (Alessandria, c. 1635 – Madrid, 21 June 1710), was an Italian court dwarf in the service of the Spanish court during the reigns of Philip IV and Charles II.

== Biography ==
Pertusato came from a noble Italian family. His name, like that of many foreigners, was transcribed imprecisely by the scribes of the palace, and over time many researchers split him into two people, so that Nicolás de Pertusato was taken to be the valet and Nicolás Portosato the dwarf. Sánchez Portillo argues that these were one and the same man, and that he is the figure portrayed by Diego Velázquez in Las Meninas. In that painting the artist emphasizes the differences between Pertusato's pituitary dwarfism, or proportionate dwarfism, and the achondroplastic dwarfism of Maria Bárbola, who appears beside him.

He entered palace service in 1650, and found his principal patron in Queen Mariana of Austria. The documentation of his employment as a dwarf ends in 1660. From 1664 onward writers hesitate over whether to call him Nicolasito or Don Nicolás, and it is around that date that the king added another grant to the two he already held: an infirmary allowance and a new ration as a servant of the Chamber.

In 1675 Charles II promoted him to valet de chambre as a personal favour.

Pertusato died at around the age of 75 with no forced heirs, leaving his property to Paula de Esquivias, who granted power of attorney for litigation to Jorge de Esquivias, priest of the parish of San Nicolás near the palace, who was probably her brother. He had made his will in 1703 before Sebastián Navarro, notary to the king; since it was a sealed will, it was opened before Manuel Riguero, deputy magistrate of Madrid, on 20 June 1710. His birthplace is known from the opening clause of the will.

== In fiction ==
Pertusato is the protagonist of Eliacer Cansino's novel El misterio Velázquez, winner of the Premio Lazarillo in 1997.
