= Apollo as Victor over Pan =

Painting by Jacob Jordaens

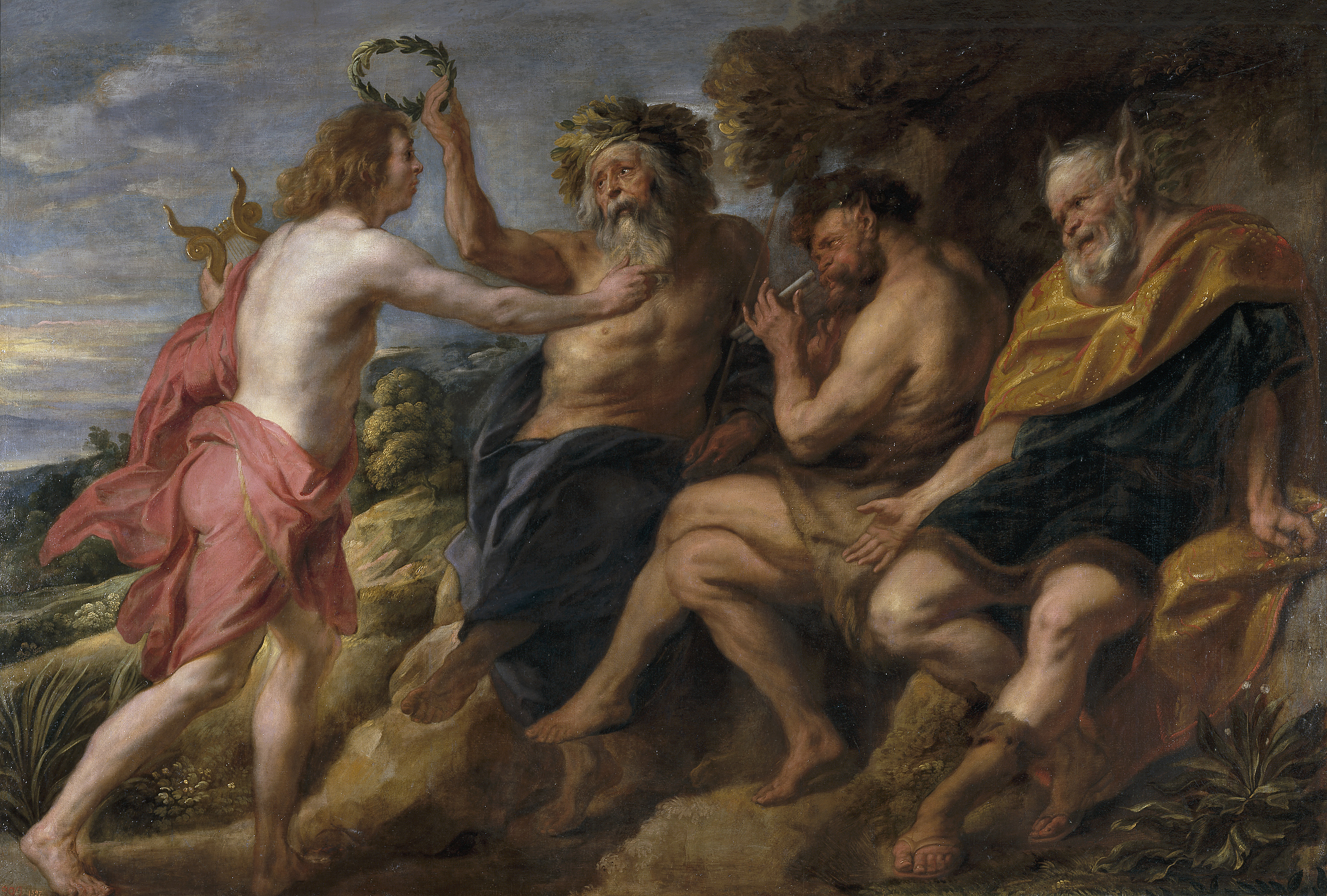
- Artist: Jacob Jordaens
- Year: 1636 - 1638
- Medium: Oil on canvas
- Movement: Flemish Baroque
- Dimensions: 180 cm × 270 cm (71 in × 110 in)
- Location: Museo del Prado, Madrid

Apollo as Victor over Pan (German: Apoll als Sieger über Pan, Spanish: Apolo, vencedor de Pan, Dutch: Het oordeel van Midas (Ovidius, Met. XI, 146-179)), also known as Apollo's Victory over Marsyas, Tmolus declaring Apollo winner in musical competition with Pan (Ovid, Metamorphoses XI) and Apollo and Pan, is a 1637 oil-on-canvas painting by Flemish Baroque painter, draughtsman and tapestry designer Jacob Jordaens.

Jordaens participated in a collaborative effort to decorate the Torre de la Parada near Madrid, done between 1636 and 1681, with one of the two paintings he contributed being Apollo as Victor over Pan (the other was Vertumnus and Pomona).

== Description ==
The subject is taken from Ovid's Metamorphoses, XI: 146-179. It depicts the flute playing contest between the god Apollo and the satyr Marsyas, which Marsyas ultimately loses. The painting shows the moments following the competition when Apollo furiously berates Midas, one of the contest's judges, for favoring the flute-playing ability of Marsyas over himself. Marsyas is presented in the canvas with human legs despite being a satyr.

== Influence ==
The canvas is Jordaens' interpretation of an earlier painting by Peter Paul Rubens entitled Apollo and Marsyas. Jordaens' painting of the Rubens canvas was then copied by Juan Bautista Martínez del Mazo, the Spanish Baroque painter and son-in-law of Diego Velázquez, the royal painter for King Philip IV of Spain. As chamberlain of the palace, Velázquez was responsible for acquisition, management and distribution of royal collections of paintings, tapestries, and sculpture which allowed him to decorate the Pieza Principal chambers of the Royal Alcázar of Madrid with Mazo's copy of the original Jordaens painting. Velázquez himself then depicted the copy of Apollo as Victor over Pan in the background of his own canvas, Las Meninas, which has been recognized as one of the most important paintings in Western art history, effectively creating a painting within a painting.

In 2014 the Museo del Prado loaned the painting, along with nine other works from its collection by Peter Paul Rubens, Anthony van Dyck, Frans Francken the Younger and others, to the Museo Carlos de Amberes in Madrid for the period of one year.
