= Benito Manuel Agüero =

Spanish painter (1626–1668)

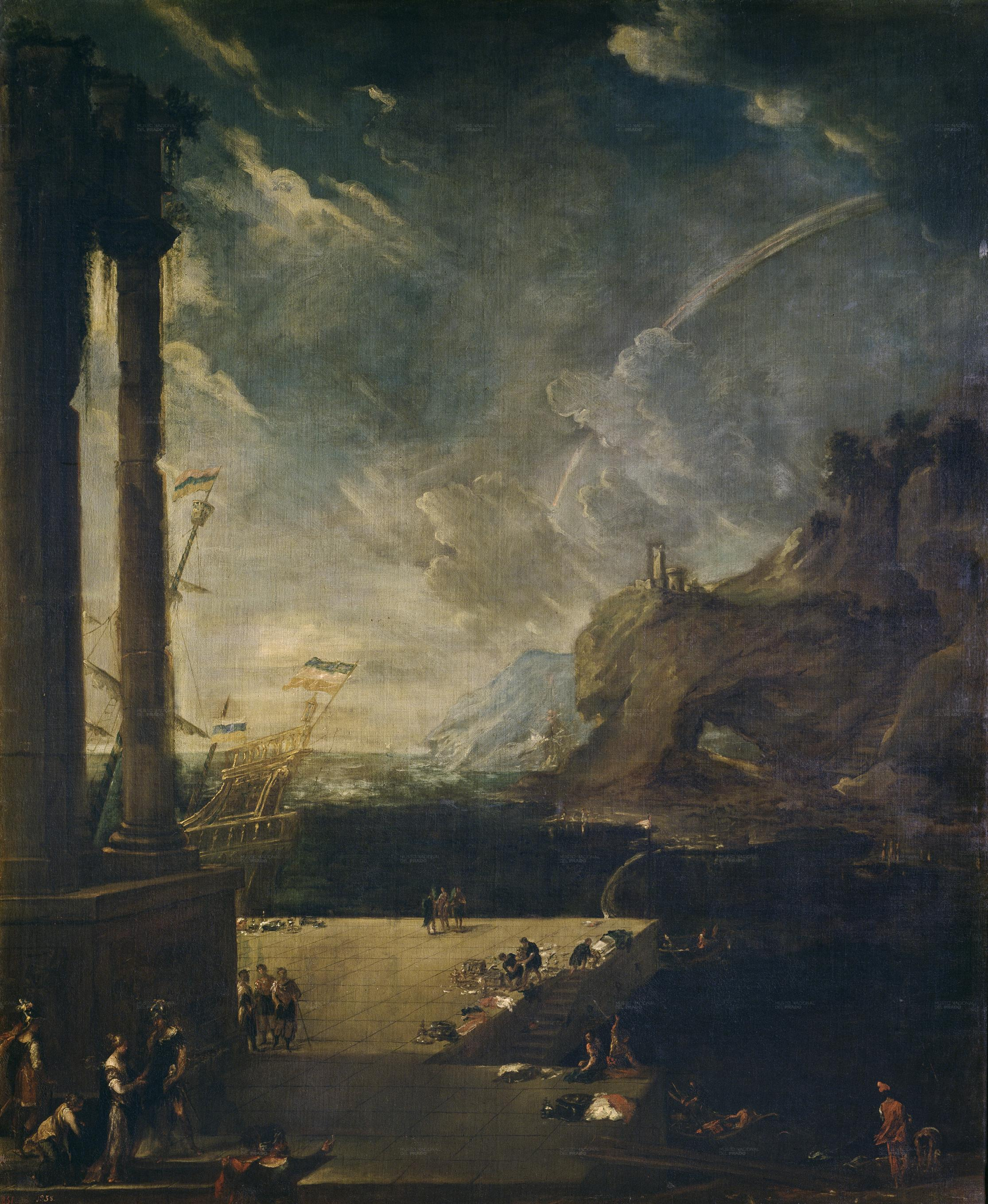
Benito Manuel Agüero, Landscape with Aeneas leaving Carthage.

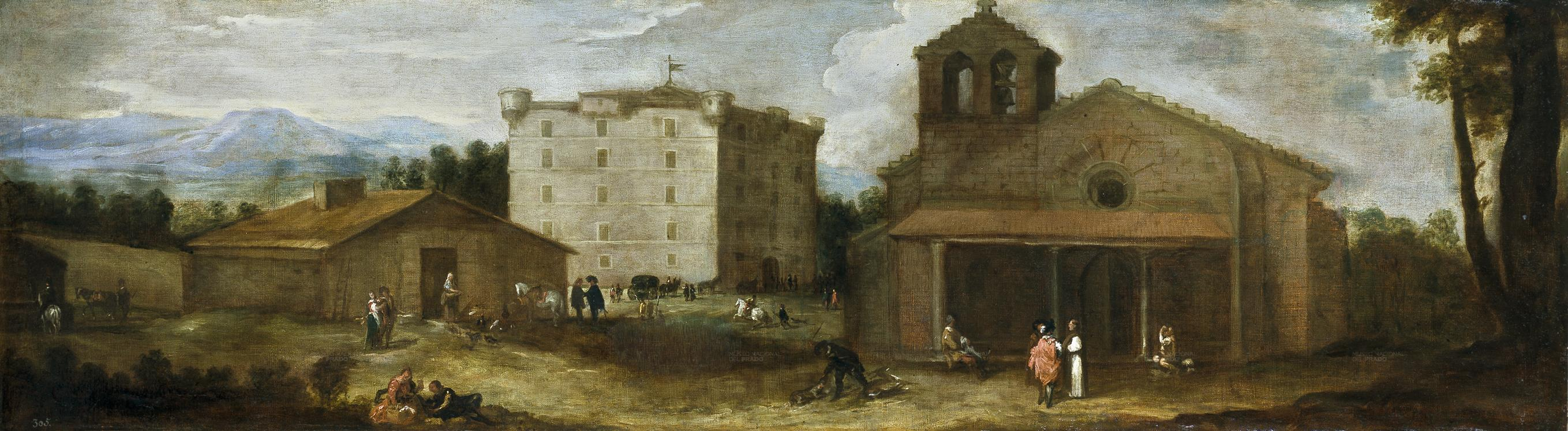
Vista del Campillo, oil on canvas (55 x 198 cm.), El Escorial, now deposited at the Museo del Prado.

Benito Manuel Agüero (1626–1668) was a Spanish painter of the Baroque period, active mainly in Madrid as a landscape and battle painter.

== Career ==
Agüero was born in Burgos and was trained under Alonso Cano. Agüero's work included landscapes and representations of mythology and religion. He also contributed to the Buen Retiro and Aranjuez palace decorations.

He was a favorite of the King Philip IV. He was a pupil of Juan Bautista Martínez del Mazo. He died in Madrid.
