= José Nieto Velázquez =

17th-century Spanish courtier

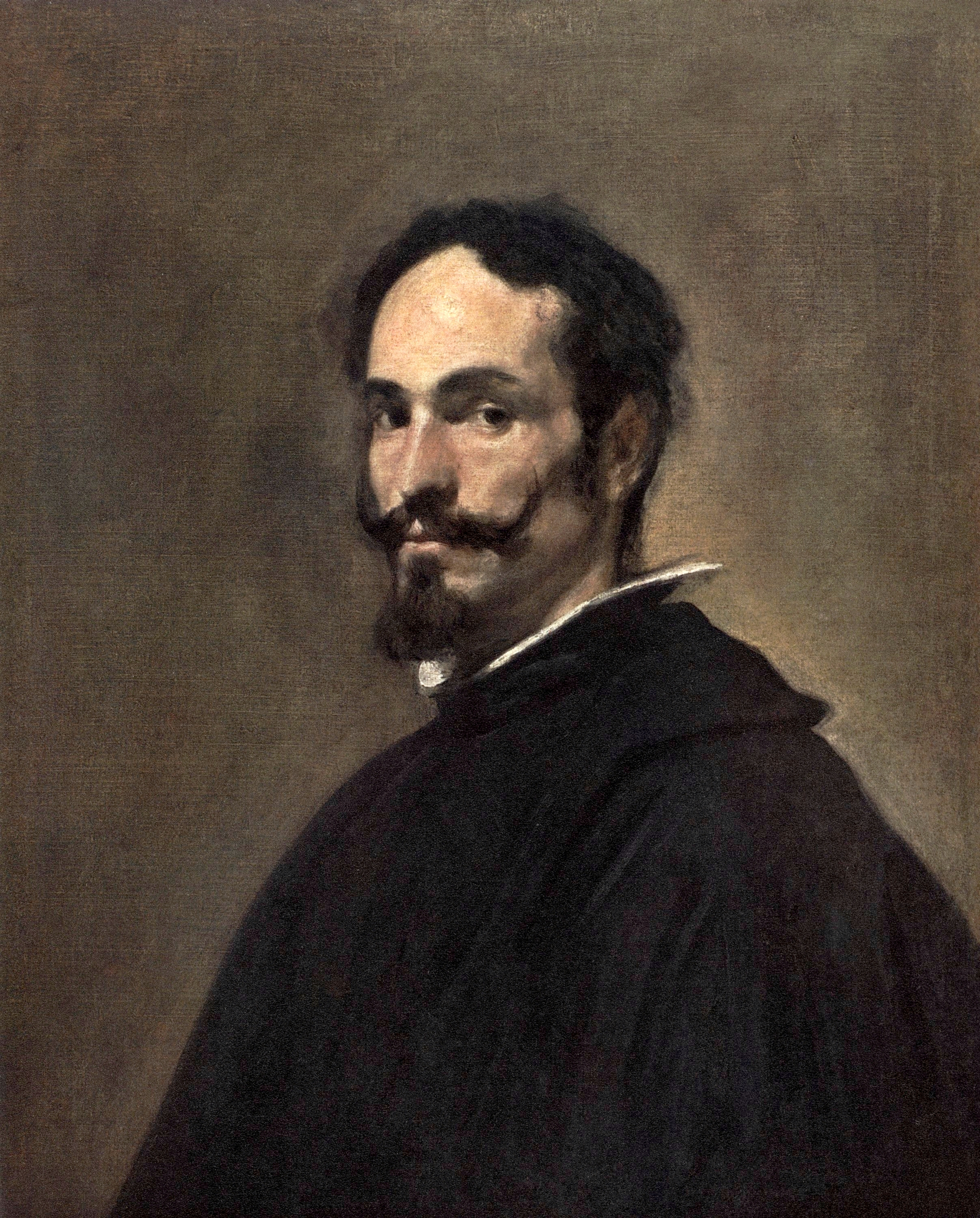
Diego Velázquez, Portrait of a Man (possibly José Nieto), c. 1635–45. Oil on canvas, Apsley House, London.

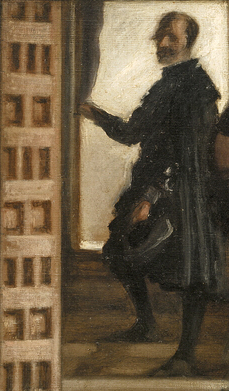
Detail of Las Meninas showing José Nieto Velázquez at the door in the background of the painting.

José Nieto Velázquez was the King's Chamberlain (Felipe IV of Spain), during the 1650s, and he was also in charge of the royal tapestry works.

He is also the figure in the doorway in Diego Velázquez's painting Las Meninas. Although the focus of Las Meninas is highly debated, the vanishing point of the whole painting is José Nieto Velázquez as he stands in the staircase. More specifically, the crook of his arm is the exact vanishing point. He seems to be paused, one foot resting on a step while his weight is on his other leg on a different step. It is unknown if he is coming or going from the stairs.
