= Analisa Leppanen =

American art historian

Analisa Leppanen (born 1971) (has also published as Analisa Leppanen-Guerra) is an American writer, art historian and curator living in Saint Joseph, Michigan. As a scholar, she works on the art and visual culture of the nineteenth and twentieth centuries, with a focus on the historical avant-garde, in particular Dada and Surrealism. She has written on Diego Velázquez, Francisco Goya, Hugo Ball, Antonin Artaud, Lee Miller, Man Ray, Marcel Duchamp and others. She has published and lectured widely on the work of American artist Joseph Cornell.

== Biography ==
Leppanen is the daughter of John R. Leppanen and American artist Marianne Leppanen. She grew up in Chicago, IL. Leppanen graduated from the International Baccalaureate program at Lincoln Park High School in 1988. She received her B.A. in English in 1991, graduating from the Honors program at DePaul University. Her first master's degree was from the Divinity School at the University of Chicago (1994). She also received her M.A. in Art History in 1998 from the University of Illinois at Chicago, and went on to graduate with a Ph.D. in Visual Studies with an emphasis in Critical Theory from the University of California, Irvine (2004).

In 2002–03, Leppanen was awarded a fellowship from the Luce Foundation/ American Council of Learned Societies.

In 1993, Leppanen and her mother Marianne founded Gallery E.G.G., a not-for-profit tax-exempt art gallery and museum devoted to ecological art, in Chicago's West Loop district. Active until the year 2000, Gallery E.G.G. was Chicago's first environmental art gallery.

Leppanen has taught art history courses at the University of California, Irvine; Columbia College, Chicago; the University of Illinois at Chicago; and DePaul University.

== Publications ==
Leppanen's first book was Children's Stories and 'Child-Time' in the Works of Joseph Cornell and the Transatlantic Avant-Garde (Ashgate, 2011), which was awarded the College Art Association Andrew Wyeth Foundation for American Art Publication Grant. Art History describes how Leppanen uses themes of childhood and stories in order to interpret Cornell's art in such a way that his work is better understood in terms of historical and cultural references.

Leppanen co-edited with Dickran Tashjian and contributed two essays for the multi-media publication Joseph Cornell's Manual of Marvels (Thames & Hudson Press, 2012). Joseph Cornell's Manual of Marvels is based on Cornell's complex and pioneering book-object Untitled (Journal d'Agriculture Pratique) (c.1930s-40s), a French agricultural yearbook dating from 1911, which Cornell altered through cut-outs, drawings, collaged material, and origami. The project includes a volume of scholarly essays (by Dickran Tashjian, Dawn Ades, and Leppanen-Guerra), partial facsimile, and interactive CD-ROM digitally reproducing the pages of the book along with commentary – all packed in a wood-grain box.

== Bibliography ==
- Leppanen-Guerra, Analisa. "Into the House of Mirrors: the Carnivalesque in Las Meninas." Aurora: The Journal of the History of Art 1(Nov. 2000): 60–77.
- Leppanen-Guerra, Analisa. "Upside-Down and Inside-Out: the Carnivalesque in the Works of Francisco Goya." The Northwestern Journal of Art History 1 (Fall 2001): 22–28.
- Leppanen-Guerra, Analisa. " 'A Stage of His Own Making': Child-Time and Dream-Space in Joseph Cornell's Theatre of Hans Christian Andersen." In Joseph Cornell: Opening the Box, edited by Stephanie L. Taylor and Jason Edwards. Oxfordshire, UK: Peter Lang Publishers, 2007.
- Leppanen-Guerra, Analisa. Children's Stories and 'Child-Time' in the Works of Joseph Cornell and the Transatlantic Avant-Garde. Surrey, UK and Burlington, VT: Ashgate Press, 2011.
- Leppanen-Guerra, Analisa and Dickran Tashjian, editors. Joseph Cornell's Manual of Marvels. Volume of essays accompanied by interactive CD-ROM and facsimile edition of Joseph Cornell's Untitled Book-Object Journal d'Agriculture Pratique. New York, NY: Thames & Hudson Press, 2012.
- Leppanen-Guerra, Analisa. "Immortal Dancers: Joseph Cornell's Pacifism During the Second World War." In Dance! American Art: 1830–1960, edited by Jane Dini. Exh. cat. New Haven: Yale University Press, Detroit Institute of Arts, 2016.
