= The Royal Family at Buckingham Palace =

Painting by Sir John Lavery

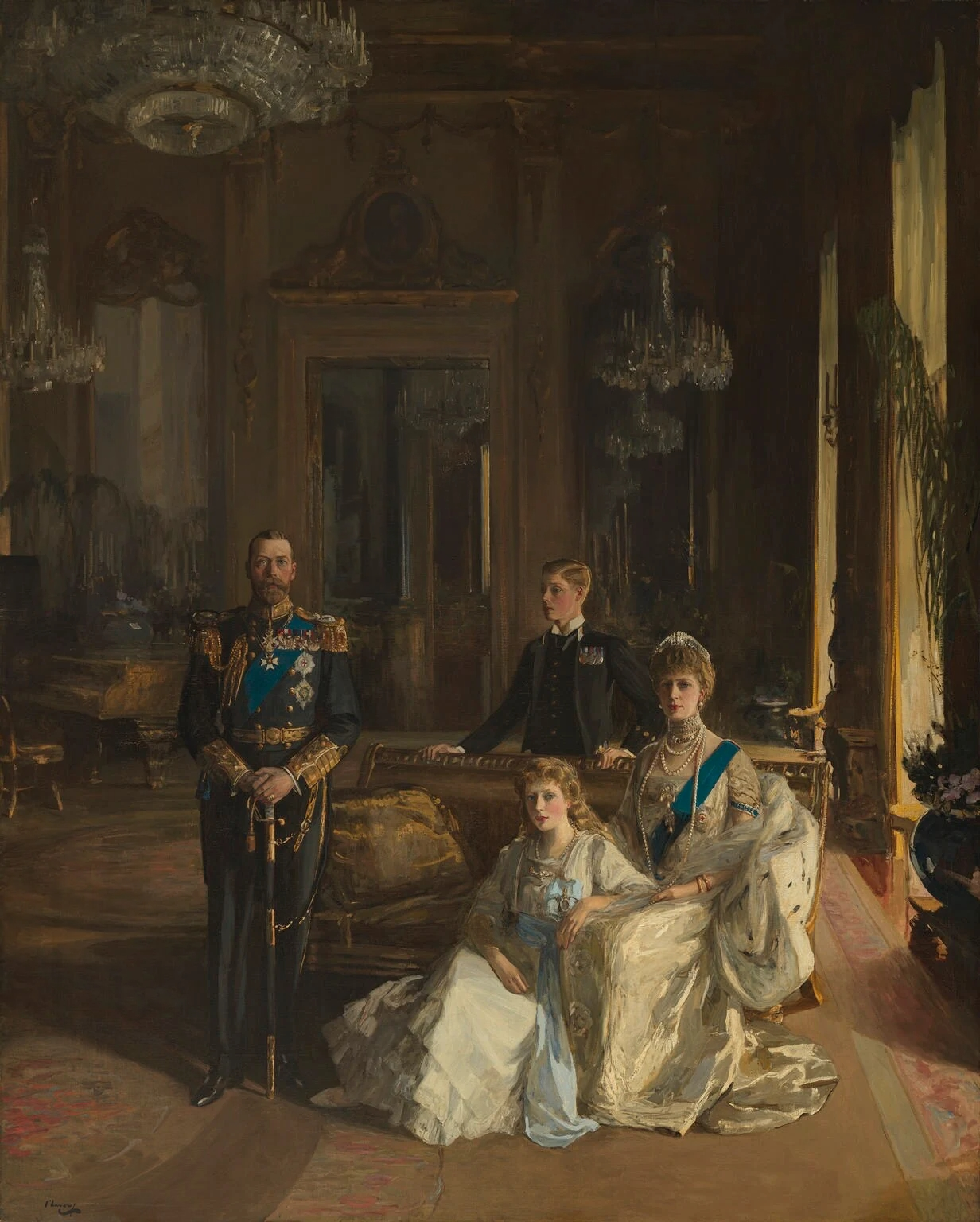
- Artist: John Lavery
- Year: 1913
- Medium: Oil on canvas
- Dimensions: 340.3 cm × 271.8 cm (134.0 in × 107.0 in)
- Location: National Portrait Gallery, London

The Royal Family at Buckingham Palace is an oil-on-canvas painting by John Lavery. It is part of the collection of the National Portrait Gallery, in London. The painting depicts King George V and Queen Mary and two of their six children, Edward, Prince of Wales and Princess Mary, in the White Drawing Room at Buckingham Palace. It was commissioned by William Hugh Spottiswoode for the NPG in 1912.

== Description ==
The painting was commissioned by William Hugh Spottiswoode for the NPG in 1912. The aim was to produce a painting that would mimic the 1846 portrait of Queen Victoria and her family by Franz Xaver Winterhalter. Sittings at Buckingham Palace were granted in early 1913, with King George V and Queen Mary sitting five and four times for the artist, respectively. They were both involved in the process leading up to the painting's final version and applied blue paint to a Garter riband during one of their visits to the artist's studio. In addition to the approved sketch, several other large-scale and group studies were produced, which initially had the King placing his right hand on a table but it the idea was dispensed with for the final version. The first group study was then given by the artist to the Queen and is in the Royal Collection.

The painting is an oil-on-canvas painting that depicts the British monarch King George V with his consort Queen Mary and two of their six children, Edward, Prince of Wales and Princess Mary, taking afternoon tea in the White Drawing Room at Buckingham Palace. The King and Queen's second son Prince Albert was not featured as was pursuing his military training at sea. The King is depicted isolated standing in his military uniform, which put emphasis on duty and service to the nation. Unveiled months before the outbreak of the First World War, it was first displayed at the Royal Academy of Arts in 1913. It was noted for its "romantic impressionism" but also the lack of "intimacy and the spontaneity of young children".
