= Maria Bárbola =

Spanish courtier (died after 1700)

Maria Bárbola, as depicted in Las Meninas, by Diego Velázquez

Maria Bárbola, also known as Mari, Mariabárbola and Mariabárbola Asquín (died after 1700), was a Spanish courtier, foremost known from the famous painting Las Meninas.

== Life ==
She was from Austria and from 1651 onward employed as a court dwarf in the household of the queen regent of Spain, Mariana of Austria, with the official title Enana de la Reina, and a companion to Margaret Theresa of Spain.

On 30 March 1700, King Phillip V reorganized the Spanish royal court in accordance with then-modern principles and as a consequence, the offices of court dwarf, fool and several other positions deemed outdated were abolished, and Maria Bárbola returned to her native Austria.

== Legacy ==
In Las Meninas, Maria Bárbola is depicted in an unusual way for a person in her position at the time. While people with dwarfism normally did not enjoy much respect in the 17th century and were often depicted in an insulting fashion, Maria Bárbola is depicted in a dignified position, standing upright beside the princess, with a thoughtful and controlled expression, meeting the eyes of the viewer.
