= José López-Rey =

Spanish art hostorian (born 1905)

- Born: 1905; Madrid, Spain
- Died: 1991 (aged 85–86)
- Awards: Doctor honoris causa from Southern Methodist University; Medalla de Oro al mérito en las Bellas Artes (1987)

Academic work
- Discipline: Art history

José López-Rey (Madrid, 1905–1991) was a Spanish art historian, known for his expertise regarding the works of Goya and Velázquez.

== Biography ==
Born in Madrid in 1905, he studied in Florence and worked in the Spanish Ministry of Education during the Second Spanish Republic. Forced into exile by the Guerra Civil, he fled to the United States in 1939 and began teaching, first at Smith College and then at the New York University Institute of Fine Arts, where he became a professor emeritus.

In 1979 he was awarded an honorary doctorate from Southern Methodist University (a Doctor of Humane Letters, honoris causa) for his contributions to art history and academic understanding of the works of Goya and Velázquez. In 1987, the Spanish Ministry of Culture awarded him the Medalla al Mérito en las Bellas Artes.

== Works ==
According to the Dictionary of Art Historians, López-Rey is the author of the following works, among others:

- Goya’s Caprichos: Beauty, Reason & Caricature, Princeton, Princeton University Press, 1953.
- A Cycle of Goya’s Drawing: the Expression of Truth and Liberty, Londres, Faber and Faber, 1956;
- Velázquez: A Catalogue Raisonné of His Oeuvre, with an Introductory Study, Londres, Faber and Faber, 1963, en colaboración con Angelica Mayer, hija de August L. Mayer;
- Velázquez' Work and World, Londres, 1968;
- Velázquez the Artist as a Maker with a Catalogue Raisonné of the Extant Works, Lausana, Bibliothèque des Arts, 1979;
- Francisco de Goya, Londres, 1951;
