= Juan Bautista Martínez del Mazo =

Spanish painter

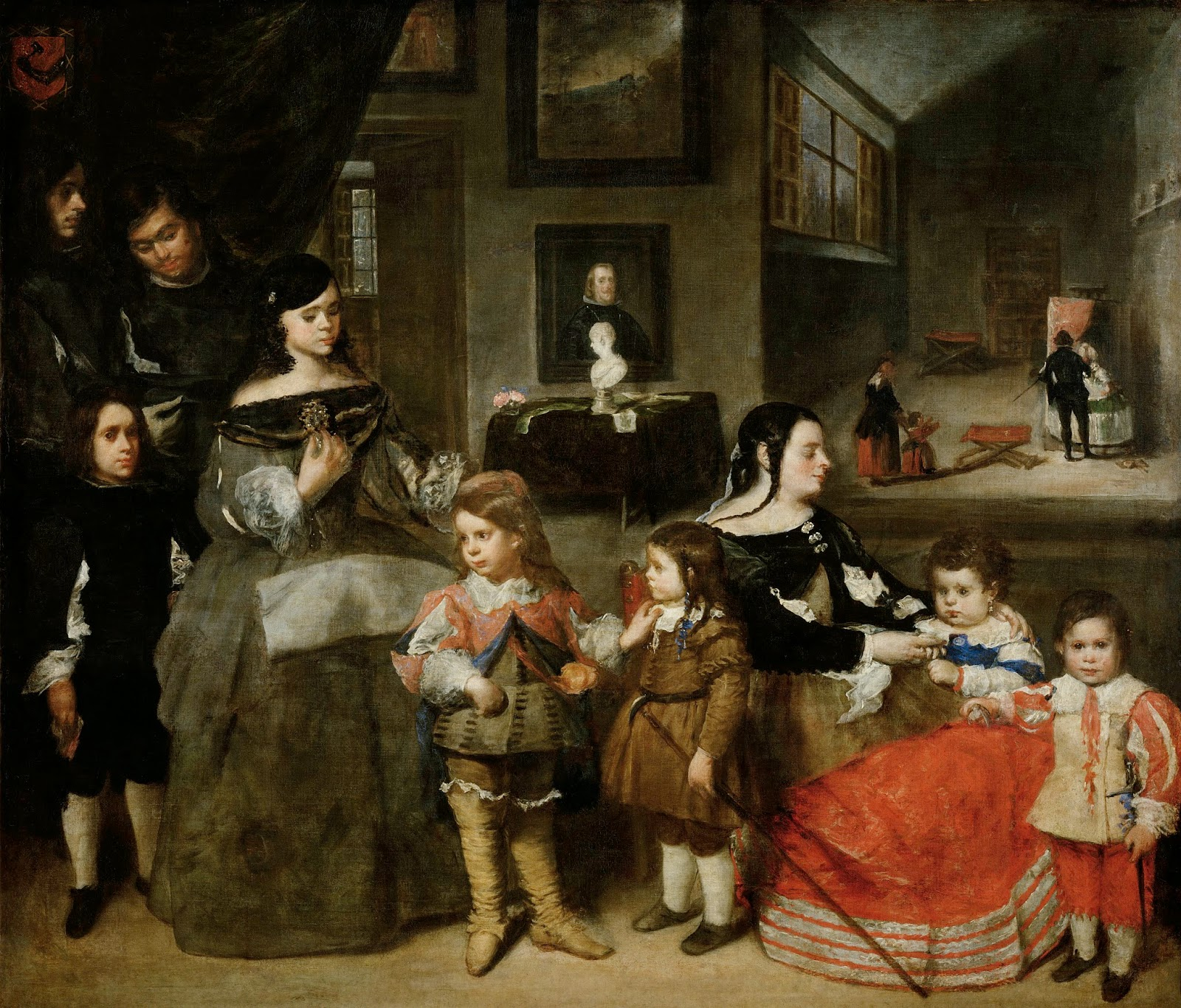
- Family of the Painter, c. 1660–1665, Kunsthistorisches Museum, Vienna, Austria
- Born: Juan Bautista Martínez del Mazo c. 1612; Cuenca, Spain
- Died: 10 February 1667 (aged 54–55); Madrid, Spain
- Known for: Painting

Juan Bautista Martínez del Mazo (c.1612 – February 10, 1667) was a Spanish Baroque portrait and landscape painter, the most distinguished of the followers of his father-in-law Velázquez, whose style he imitated more closely than did any other artist. A fine painter himself, Mazo was a master of landscape, as proven by his most celebrated work View of Saragossa.

== Life ==
Little is really known about del Mazo's early life. The date and place of his birth are uncertain. Apparently, he was born in Cuenca, as his parents, Hernando Martínez and Lucia Bueno del Mazo, were from that province. However, some sources consider Madrid as his native city. The date of his birth has been estimated around 1612 since it is known that his mother was born in 1596 and he married in 1633 when he probably was in his early twenties.

The whereabouts of his training remain a mystery. He must have been in Velázquez's workshop sometimes before his marriage, so it is quite possible that he had been his future father-in-law's apprentice. Del Mazo married the famous painter's only surviving daughter, Francisca de Silva Velázquez y Pacheco, on August 21, 1633, at the Church of Santiago in Madrid. Philip IV and the Prime Minister, the Count-Duke of Olivares, served as the couple's sponsors. The marriage was the event that guaranteed Mazo's future success at Court. Velázquez immediately arranged a royal appointment and on February 23, 1634, he transferred to del Mazo his position of Usher of the King's Chamber, with the permission of the King. From this it can be assumed that del Mazo was then already a disciple of the famous painter, and from that date he was closely associated with his father-in-law with whom he lived and collaborated. Velázquez furthered del Mazo's career with a steady hand and secured palace appointments for him and later for del Mazo's children.

== Early career ==
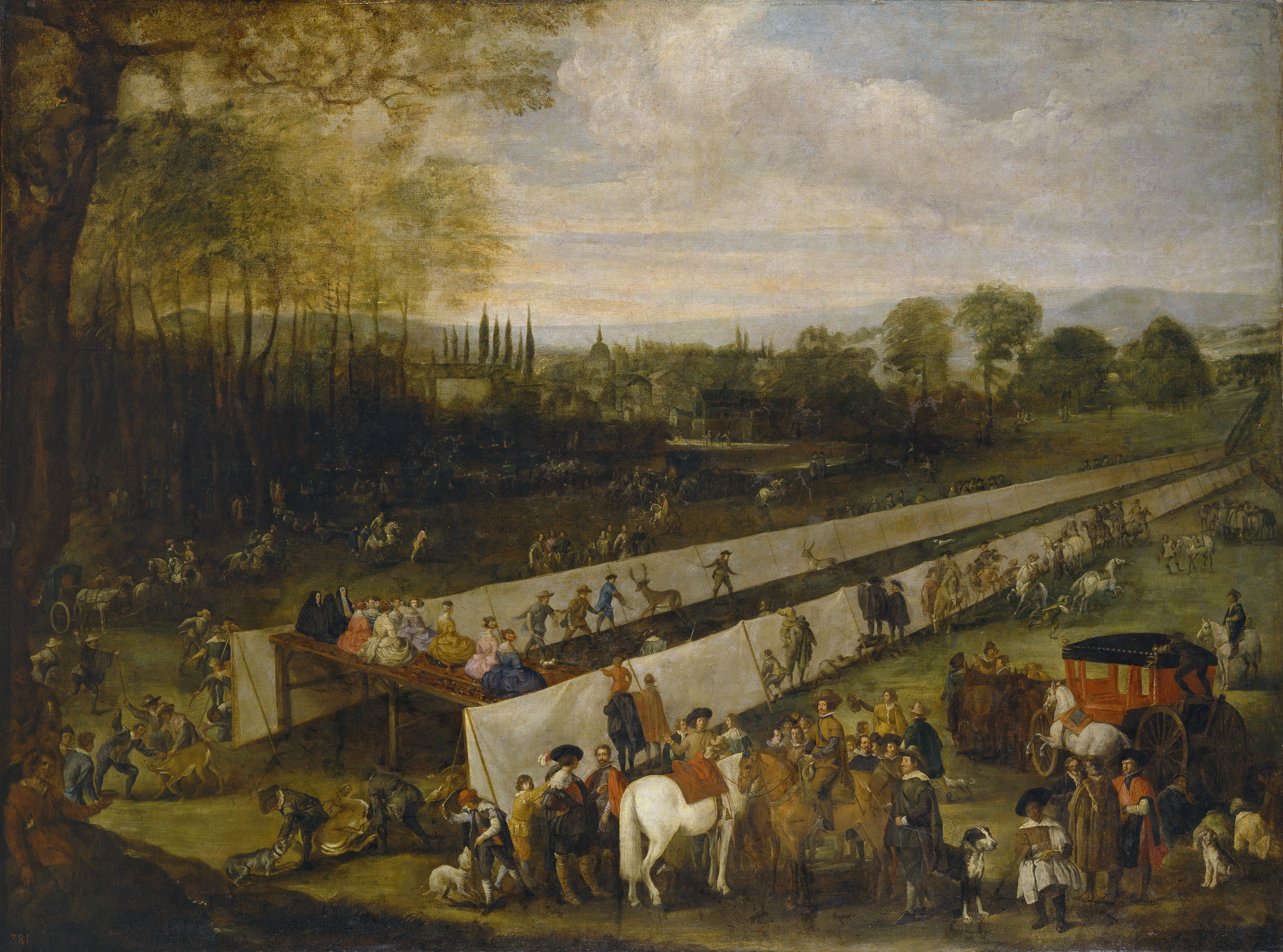
Stag Hunt at Aranjuez, Museo del Prado, Madrid

In 1643, Mazo became Master of Drawing and personal painter of the heir to the Spanish Crown, Baltasar Carlos, Prince of Asturias, who in 1645 became godfather of his fifth child. Prince Baltasar Carlos commissioned him to copy hunt scenes by Paul de Vos, Rubens, Jordaens and other Flemish painters. Mazo accompanied the prince to Aragón in 1646. During this trip, he painted the famous View of Saragossa and a last portrait of the young prince who died unexpectedly at the age of sixteen. After the death of the prince, Philip IV decreed that the perquisites that Mazo had been receiving be continued, and kept him employed as a painter.

Mazo first expressed his talent copying works of Venetian masters in the royal collections, such as Tintoretto, Titian, and Paul Veronese, a task that he performed with assiduity and success. His colorful work as a copyist opened his way to the secrets of the great masters of his time, especially Rubens and Jordaens. Such copies must have considerably cut down the time available for his original work, as did the production of replicas of Velázquez's royal portraits that he painted; an example would be his portrait of Infanta Margaret Theresa that today is exhibited next to the Velázquez original in a Viennese museum. Nevertheless, Mazo still felt free to follow his own bent for brilliancy of execution and true-to-life naturalism.

Mazo rarely signed his works, which furthered the confusion with the work of Velázquez, making it difficult to separate the authorship of their paintings. In fact, there are few extant paintings that scholars agree are his; these include View of Saragossa (1646, Prado); Portrait of Queen Mariana in Mourning Dress (1666, National Gallery, London); and The Family of the Painter (c. 1660–1665, Kunsthistorisches Museum, Vienna). He has some of his works in the Prado, near those of his mentor.

Although Mazo acquired great skills as a portrait painter, some of his most interesting works are hunting pieces and landscapes in which he developed a more personal style with a respect for reality. They are animated with a multitude of figures treated with extreme detail. His landscapes are works of great observation as exemplified by his paintings View of Saragossa and Stag Hunt at Aranjuez – both were commissioned by Philip IV. He also painted some still lifes. In 1657 Mazo traveled to Italy trying to recover the dowry of his eldest daughter Ines who had become a widow in Naples. During this trip, Mazo painted The Arch of Tito that shows the influence of Roman landscapes.

== Personal style ==
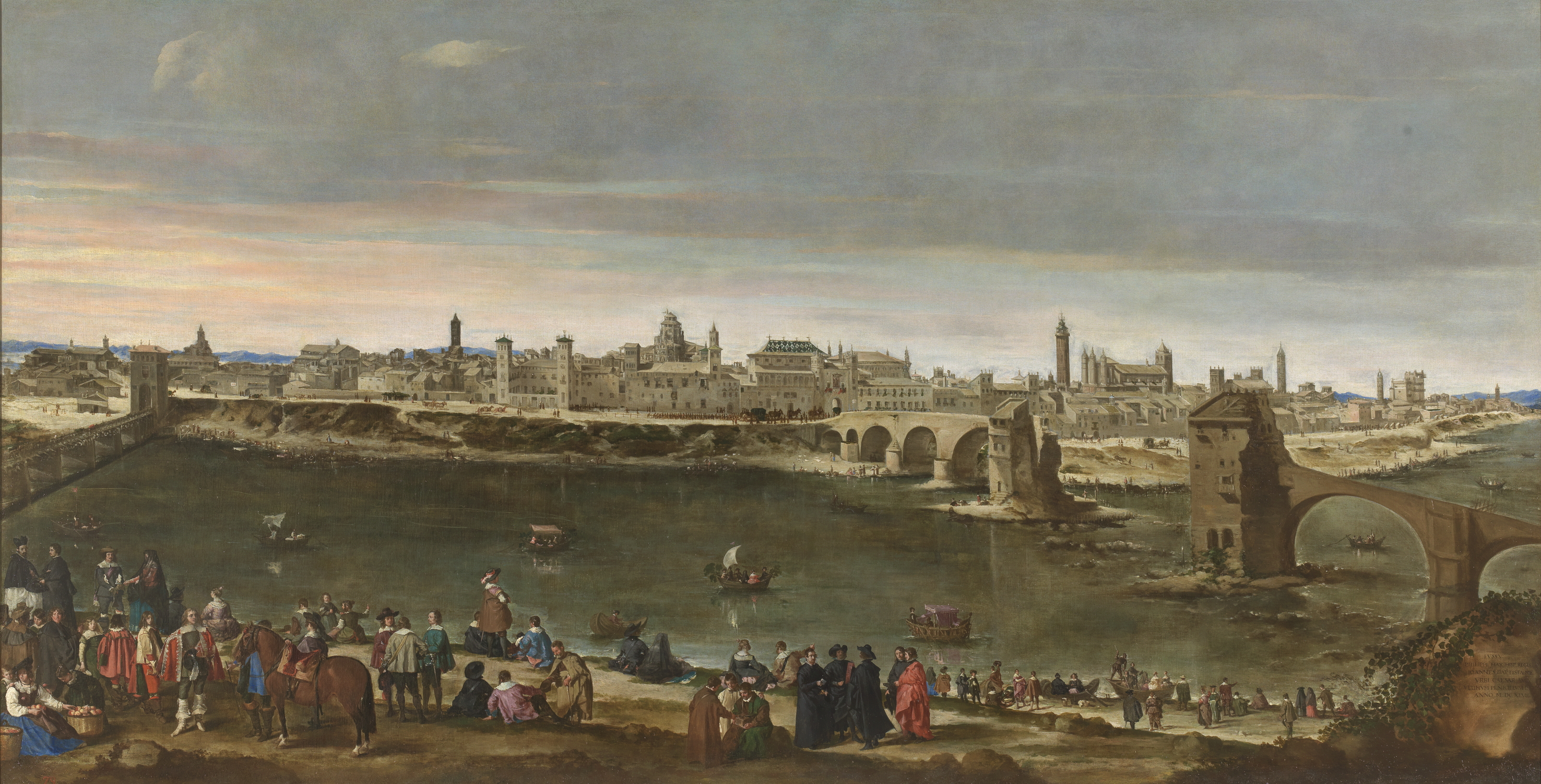
View of Saragossa, 1647, Museo del Prado, Madrid

Mazo's works owe credit above all to Velázquez, whose style he was long compelled to emulate in Court portraits. However, Mazo shows in his paintings a personality of his own. His portraits exhibit startling naturalism and marvelous execution. Mazo was particularly skillful in painting small figures, a cardinal element in both his hunting scenes and the landscapes he painted as in his most celebrated work View of Saragossa.

Mazo's palette was rather like that of Velázquez, except for a penchant often shown for stressing blue or bluish tints. The departure from his master's style is reflected in his way of shaping people and things by highlights which flash the pictorial image towards the surface of the painting, even from the background. As a counterbalance, an explicit, even emphatic, perspective design marks out the spatial confines of the composition, making it appear squarish. A further departure from Velázquez is his luxurious depiction of detail or incident which he achieved with brilliant, depthless strokes, whether on the figure of a sitter, a curtain on a wall, a floor, the surface of a river, or on plain earthen grounds. These stylistic traits reveal Mazo's own personality as an artist. For centuries, Mazo's paintings were attributed to Velázquez, but modern art criticism, techniques, and knowledge have been able to separate their works.

Among his pupils was Benito Manuel Agüero (1626–1672).

== Official Court Painter ==
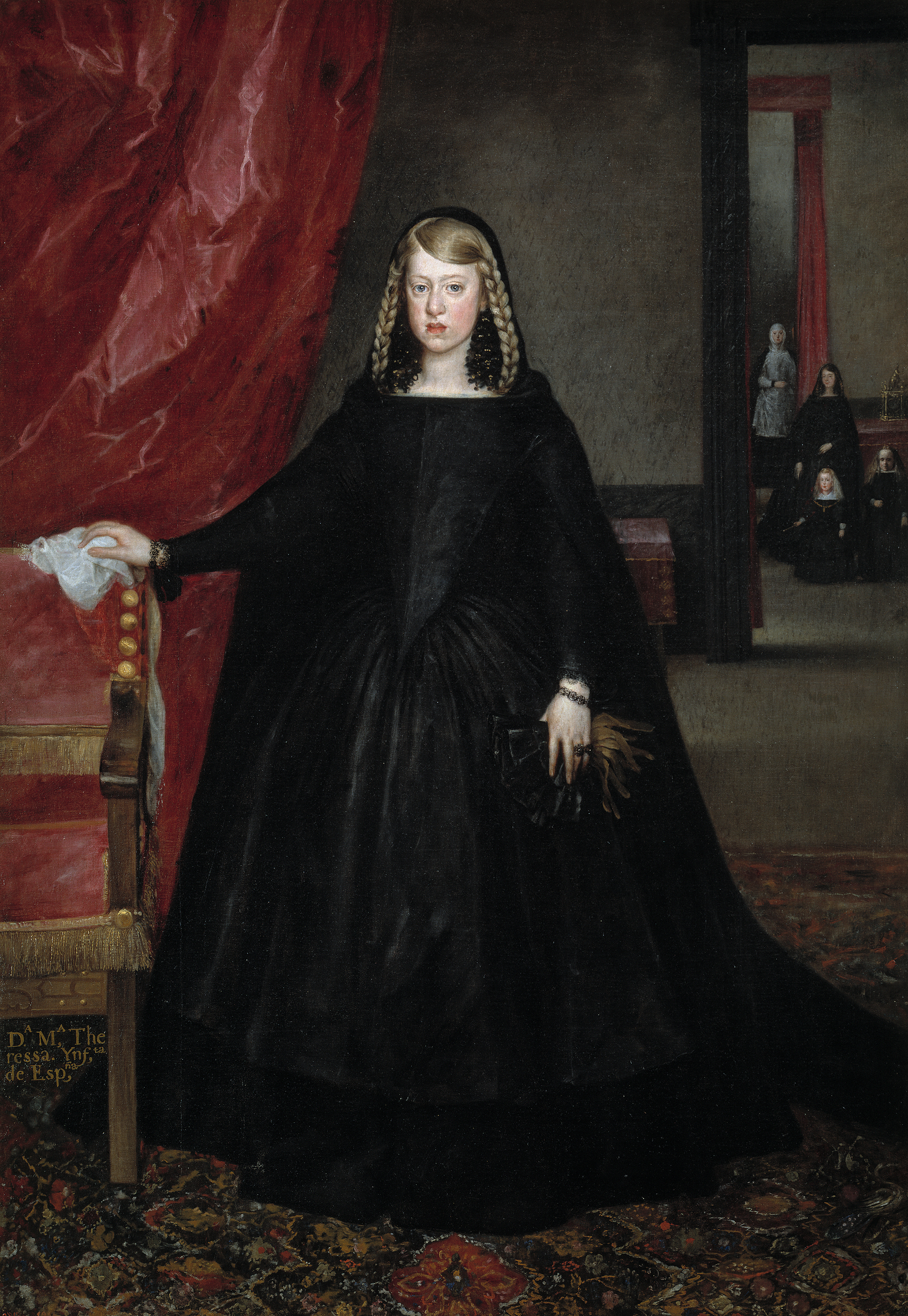
Infanta Margarita Teresa of Spain in Mourning Dress, 1666, Prado

As long as Velázquez lived, Mazo wrought all of his art in his father-in-law's studio. After Velázquez's death in 1660, Philip IV appointed him as the official Court painter on April 19, 1661, while his son Gaspar took his former position as Usher to the Chamber. At the death of Philip IV in 1665, Mazo kept his position at Court under the regency of Queen Mariana, whose portrait in mourning dress (National Gallery, London, 1666) is one of his few signed works. In this period, he painted a portrait of Infanta Margarita Teresa, also in mourning dress, before she left Spain to marry the Austrian Emperor. Mazo held his position as official Court painter until his death in Madrid on February 9, 1667.

== Descendants ==
Mazo's first wife, Francisca de Silva Velázquez y Pacheco (1619–1658), gave him six children; she died shortly after the last child was born. His second wife, Francisca de La Vega, shown in his painting The Family of the Painter, died in 1665; they had four sons. His third wife was his sister-in-law, Ana de la Vega, who survived him and remarried. Through his daughter María Teresa Martínez del Mazo y Velázquez (1648–1692), he is an ancestor of the Marquesses of Monteleone, including Enriquetta (Henrietta) Casado de Monteleone (1725–1761) who in 1746 married Heinrich VI, Count Reuss zu Köstritz (1707–1783). Through them, most of today's European royalty descend, including: Queen Sofía of Spain, Queen Beatrix of the Netherlands, King Carl XVI Gustaf of Sweden, King Albert II of Belgium, Queen Margrethe II of Denmark, Hans-Adam II, Prince of Liechtenstein, and Henri, Grand Duke of Luxembourg.

== Bibliography ==
- López-Rey, José, Velázquez, Taschen, 1999. ISBN 3-8228-6533-8.
- Mallory, Nina A, El Greco to Murillo: Spanish painting in the Golden Age, 1556–1700 , Icon Editions,1990. ISBN 0-06-435531-4.
- Madrazo, Pedro de (1872). Catálogo Descriptivo e Histórico del Museo del Prado de Madrid (Parte Primera: Escuelas Italianas y Españolas). Calle del Duque de Osuna #3; Original from Oxford University, Digitized May 1, 2007: M. Rivadeneyra. pp. 442–444.
