= Lump (dog) =

Dog that lived with Picasso

- Species: Canis familiaris
- Breed: Dachshund
- Sex: Male
- Born: 1956; Stuttgart, Germany
- Died: 29 March 1973 (aged 16-17)
- Nationality: West Germany
- Known for: Pablo Picasso's muse
- Owner: David Douglas Duncan

Lump (1956 – 29 March 1973), was a Dachshund owned by David Douglas Duncan who lived with artist Pablo Picasso for six years, and featured in several of his works.

== Early life ==
Born in Stuttgart, Germany, and named after the German word for "rascal", the dog was acquired by David Douglas Duncan, an American photographer. Lump was purchased at the age of three months from a German family in order to act as a companion for Duncan's Afghan Hound, Kubla. The two dogs did not get along well, with the larger Afghan treating Lump much like a toy, rolling him around Duncan's apartment.

== Pablo Picasso ==
One of Picasso's recreations of Las Meninas, featuring Lump in place of the original dog

Lump first met Picasso on 19 April 1957 at La Californie, Picasso's hillside mansion in Cannes. His owner, David Douglas Duncan, had photographed Picasso for the first time during the previous year. On this occasion he chose to bring along Lump, as the Dachshund didn't get along with his other dog. While having lunch with his future wife Jacqueline Roque and Duncan, Picasso enquired if the dog had ever had a plate of his own. When Duncan responded no, Picasso picked up a brush and paint that were on the table and painted a portrait of Lump on his own dinner plate. With the work dated and inscribed to Lump, he handed the plate to Duncan as a gift. The dog felt immediately at home and stayed with Picasso for the next six years at La Californie, living with Picasso's Boxer Yan and a goat named Esmeralda. Duncan spoke of Lump and Picasso, "This was a love affair. Picasso would take Lump in his arms. He would feed him from his hand. Hell, that little dog just took over. He ran the damn house."

Duncan would return to visit Picasso during this time, and photographed the artist with Lump on several occasions along with Picasso's children. While Picasso preferred to work alone, he would often be accompanied by Lump. In one series of photographs, he made a rabbit out of a sugar impregnated cardboard cake box for the dog, who carried it into the garden to eat.

Duncan spoke of Lump's stay with Picasso, "Lump had an absolutely pampered life there. Picasso once said, ‘Lump, he’s not a dog, he’s not a little man, he’s somebody else.’ Picasso had many dogs, but Lump was the only one he took in his arms."

In 1964, during a visit with Picasso, Duncan was informed that Lump was unwell. The dog was suffering from a spinal condition leaving him without the use of his back legs and was being looked after by a local vet in Cannes. Duncan visited the vet and was informed that the condition could not be cured, and the vet was no longer feeding him. Duncan sought a second opinion, taking back the dog, he drove it to Stuttgart, Germany, where he found a vet who was willing to treat Lump. The treatment took several months, but Lump would go on to live for another ten years, albeit walking as Duncan would describe "a bit like a drunken sailor". He died only ten days before Picasso, on 29 March 1973.

== Legacy ==
In 2006, the book Picasso & Lump: A Dachshund's Odyssey by David Douglas Duncan was published by Thames & Hudson. The 100-page book consists of photographs taken by Duncan of Lump and Picasso at La Californie, in 1957.

Picasso painted 44 studies of Diego Velázquez's 1656 painting Las Meninas between 17 August and 30 December 1957; Lump appeared in 15 of them. The series were donated to the Museu Picasso in Barcelona.

The painted plate that Picasso created on their first meeting was donated to the Harry Ransom Center at the University of Texas at Austin by Duncan in 2011. Similar painted plates have sold at auction for between $20,000 and $90,000.

== See also ==
- List of individual dogs
