= Picasso & Lump =

2006 book by David Douglas Duncan

- Author: David Douglas Duncan
- Language: English
- Genre: Non-fiction
- Publisher: Thames & Hudson
- Publication date: 2006
- ISBN: 0821258109

Picasso & Lump: A Dachshund's Odyssey (ISBN 0821258109) is a 2006 book by David Douglas Duncan that features professional photographs of Pablo Picasso and his dachshund, Lump. The book, published by Thames & Hudson, gives an insight into Picasso's later life, and Picasso the man, not the image. The book contrasts black-and-white photos of Picasso, his wife Jacqueline, and Lump with Picasso's colourful interpretations, which feature Lump, of Diego Velázquez's 1656 painting Las Meninas.

The book is alternatively known as, Lump: The Dog Who Ate a Picasso.
