= Dachshund =

German breed of dog

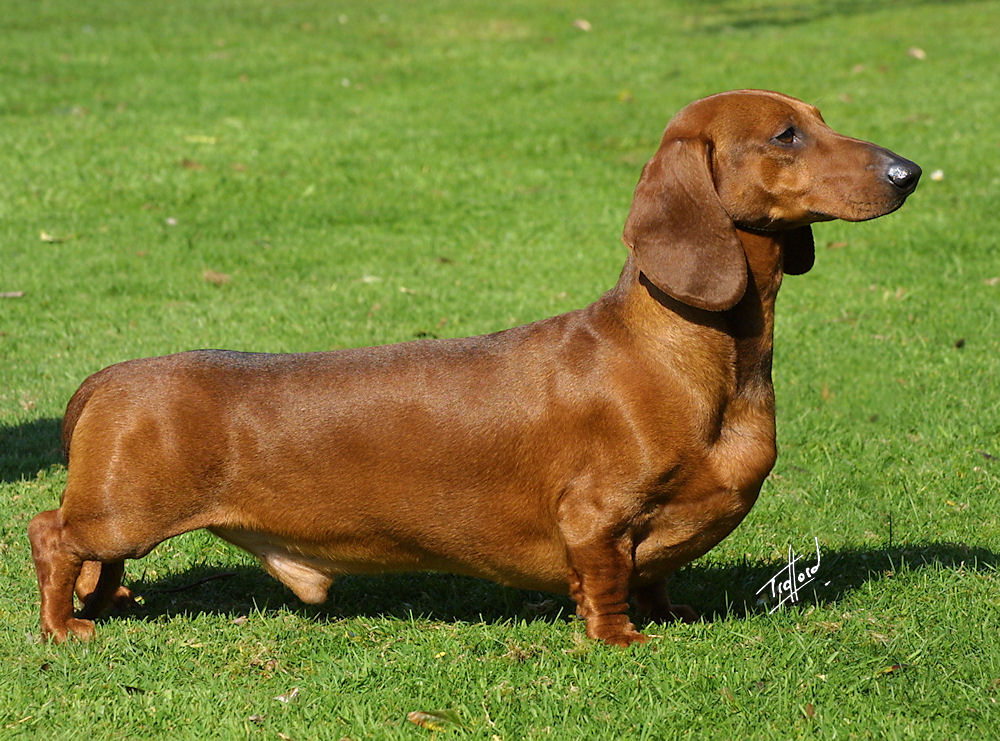
- Origin: Germany
Traits
- Height: Miniature Dachshund: 5–6 in (13–15 cm) at the withers Standard Dachshund: 8–9 in (20–23 cm) at the withers
- Weight: Miniature Dachshund: up to 11 pounds (5.0 kg) Standard Dachshund: 16–32 lb (7.3–14.5 kg)
- Coat: Smooth-haired, Long-haired, Wire-haired
- Colour: Solid red, black & tan, chocolate & tan, dapple, brindle, piebald or blue.
Kennel club standards
- Verband für das Deutsche Hundewesen: standard
- Fédération Cynologique Internationale: standard

The Dachshund, (Note: UK: /ˈdækshʊnd, -ənd, -hʊnt/ DAKS-huund, -ənd, -huunt or US: /ˈdɑːkshʊnt, -hʊnd, -ənt/ DAHKS-huunt, -huund, -ənt;) also known as the Dackel or Teckel, is a German breed of short-legged, long-bodied dog of hound type. It may be smooth-haired, wire-haired, or long-haired, in various colors.

It was bred to scent, chase, and flush out badgers and other burrow-dwelling animals. The miniature Dachshund was bred to hunt small animals such as rabbits.

== Etymology ==
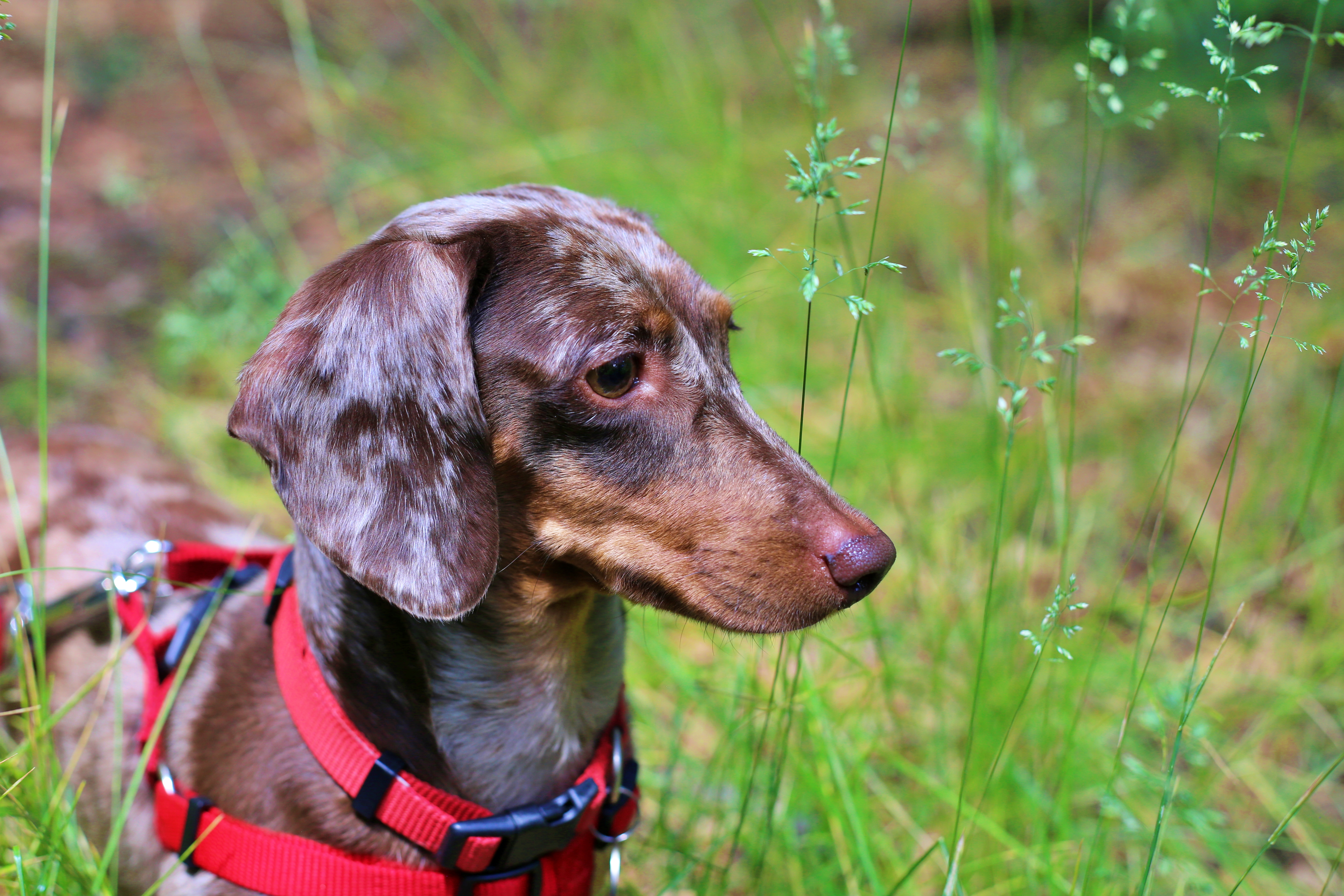
Dapple Dachshund with spotted coat

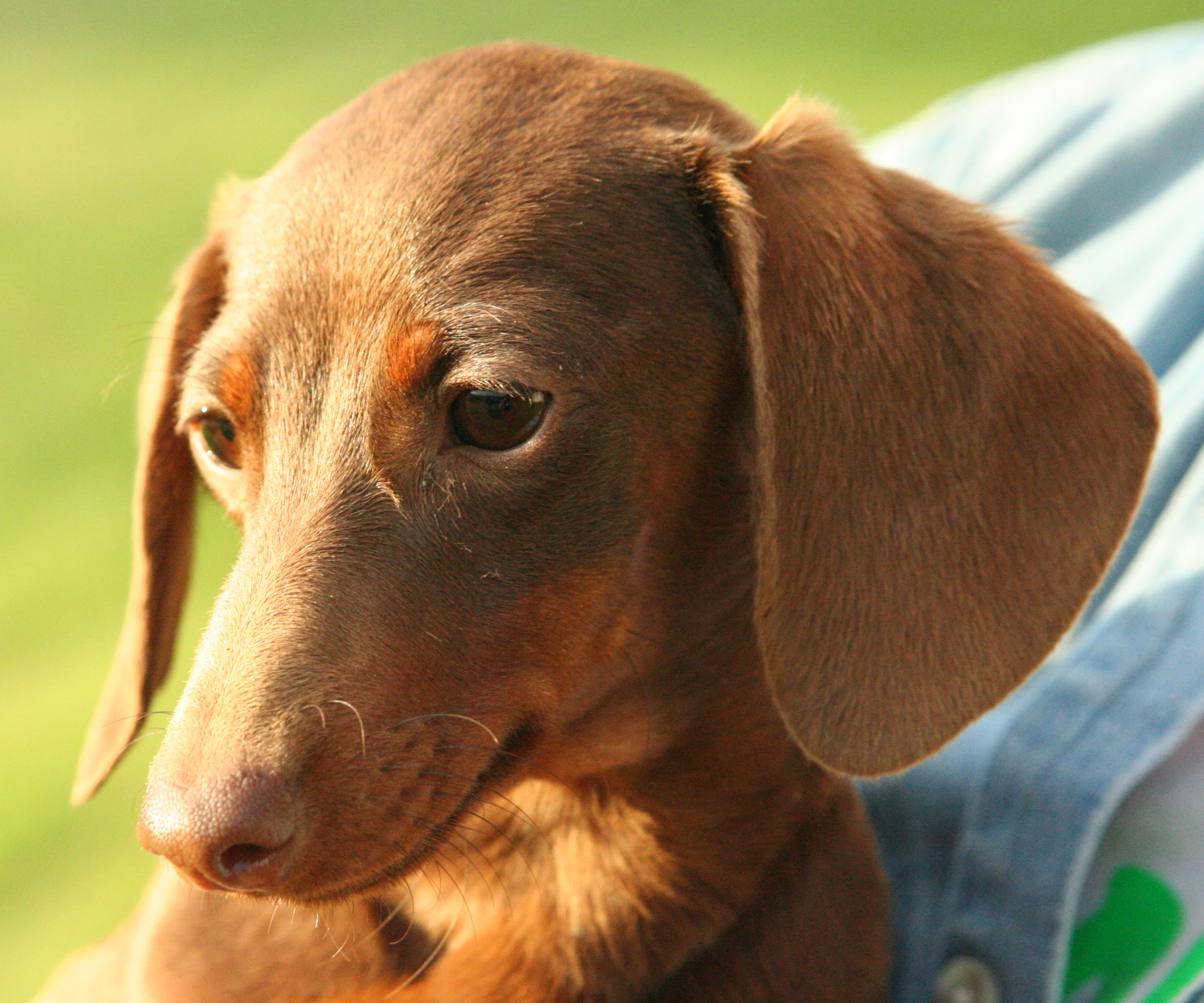
A smooth Dachshund

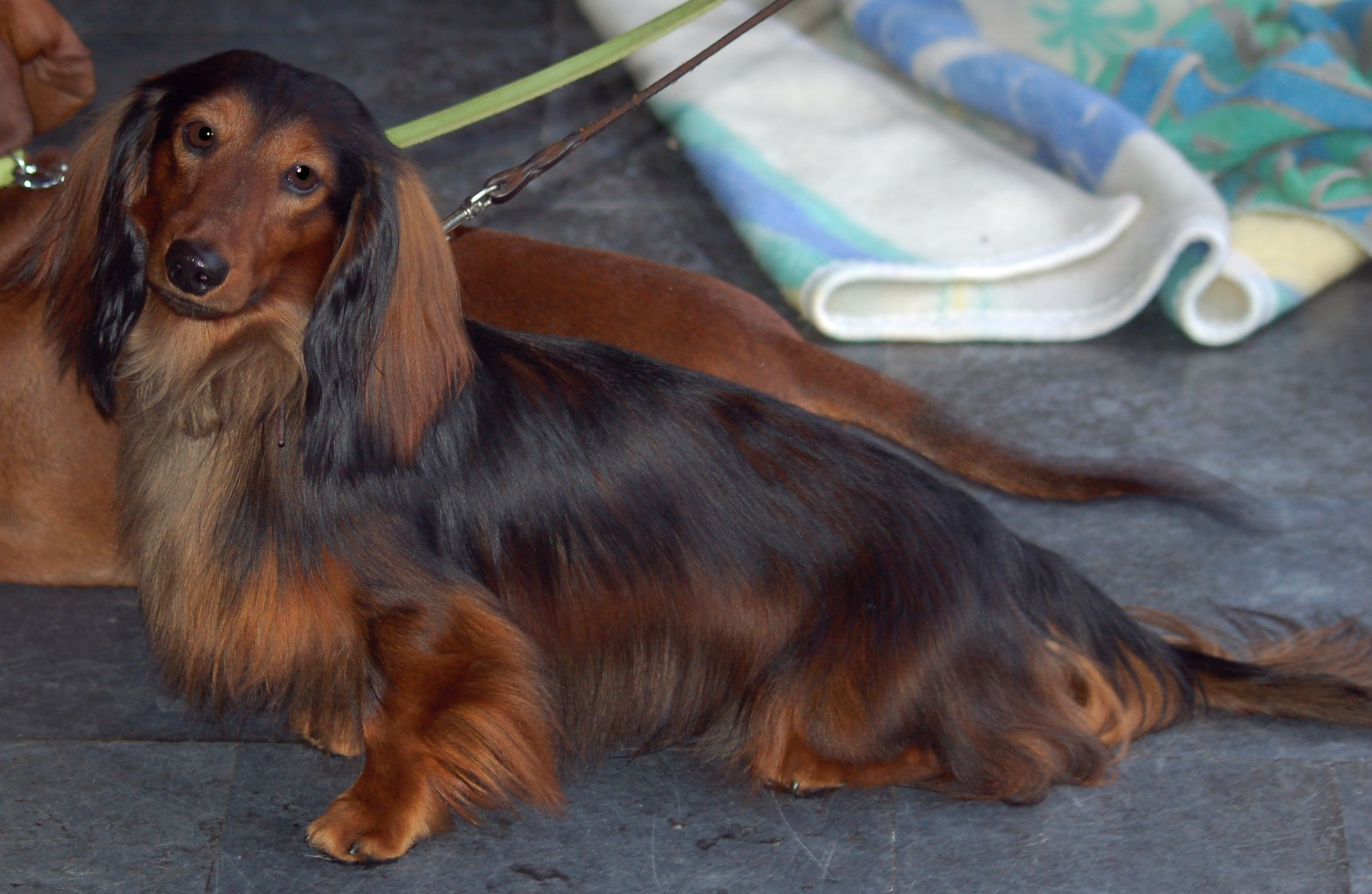
A standard long-haired Dachshund

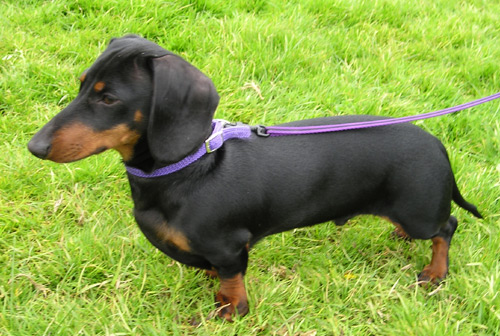
A black-and-tan miniature Dachshund

The name Dachshund is of German origin, and means 'badger dog', from Dachs ('badger') and Hund ('dog, hound'). The German word Dachshund is pronounced [ˈdaks.hʊnt]. The pronunciation varies in English: variations of the first and second syllables include /ˈdɑːks-/, /ˈdæks-/ and /-hʊnt/, /-hʊnd/, /-ənd/. The first syllable may be pronounced as /ˈdæʃ-/ by some English speakers. Although Dachshund is a German word, in modern Germany, the dogs are more commonly known by the short name Dackel. Working dogs are less commonly known as Teckel.

Because of their long, narrow build, they are often nicknamed the wiener dog in the US and Canada or the sausage dog in the British Isles and Australasia.

== History ==
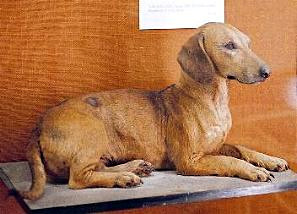
A dachshund taxidermy from the early 20th century

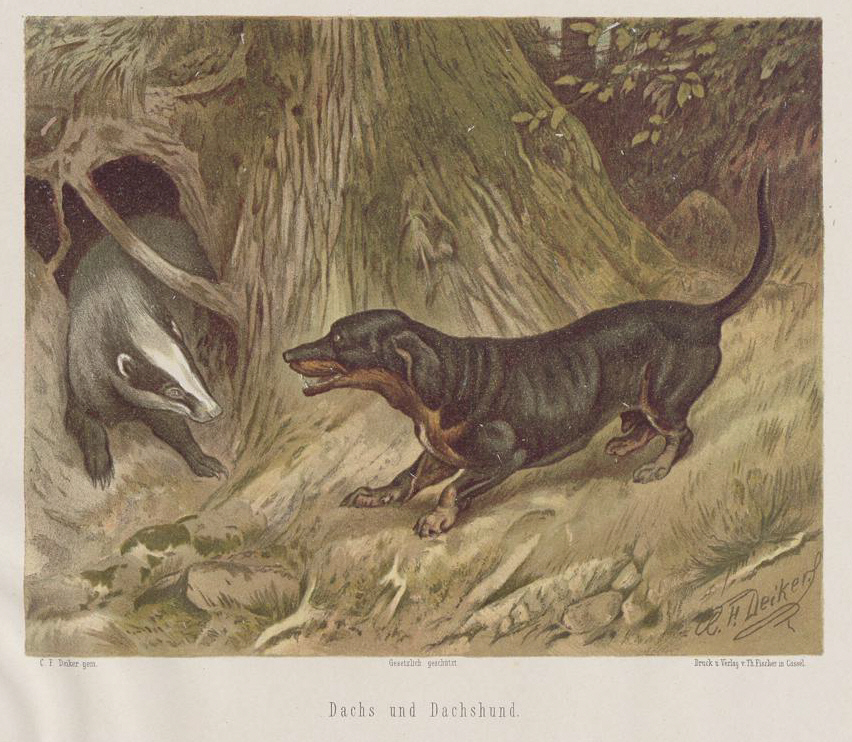
Illustration of a Dachshund baying a European badger

The Dachshund is a creation of German breeders and includes elements of German, French, and English hounds and terriers. Dachshunds have been kept by royal courts all over Europe, including that of Queen Victoria, who was particularly enamored of the breed.

The first verifiable references to the Dachshund, originally named the "Dachs Kriecher" ("badger crawler") or "Dachs Krieger" ("badger warrior"), came from books written in the early 18th century. Prior to that, there exist references to "badger dogs" and "hole dogs", but these likely refer to purposes rather than to specific breeds. The original German Dachshunds were larger than the modern full-size variety, weighing between 14 and 18 kg (31 and 40 lb), and originally came in straight-legged and crook-legged varieties (the modern Dachshund is descended from the latter). Though the breed is famous for its use in exterminating badgers and badger-baiting, Dachshunds were also commonly used for rabbit and fox hunting, for locating wounded deer, and in packs were known to hunt game as large as wild boar and as fierce as the wolverine.

There are huge differences of opinion as to when Dachshunds were specifically bred for their purpose of hunting badger, as the American Kennel Club states the Dachshund was bred in the 15th century, while the Dachshund Club of America states that the dogs were first described in the 18th and 19th centuries. The Dachshund was officially recognized as a breed by the American Kennel Club in 1885.

Double-dapple Dachshunds, which are prone to eye disease, blindness, or hearing problems, are generally believed to have been introduced to the United States between 1879 and 1885.

The flap-down ears and famous curved tail of the Dachshund have deliberately been bred into the dog. In the case of the ears, this is to keep grass seeds, dirt, and other matter from entering the ear canal. The curved tail is dual-purposed: to be seen more easily in long grass and, in the case of burrowing Dachshunds, to help haul the dog out if it becomes stuck in a burrow. The smooth-haired Dachshund, the oldest style, may be a cross between the German Shorthaired Pointer, a Pinscher, and a Bracke (a type of bloodhound), or to have been produced by crossing a short Bruno Jura Hound with a pinscher. Others believe it was a cross from a miniature French pointer and a pinscher; others claim that it was developed from the St. Hubert Hound, also a bloodhound, in the 18th century, and still others believe that they were descended from Basset Hounds, based upon their scent abilities and general appearance.

The exact origins of the Dachshund are therefore unknown. According to William Loeffler, from The American Book of the Dog (1891), in the chapter on Dachshunds: "The origin of the Dachshund is in doubt, our best authorities disagreeing as to the beginning of the breed." What can be agreed on, however, is that the smooth Dachshund gave rise to both the long-haired and the wire-haired varieties.

There are two theories about how the standard long-haired Dachshund came about. One theory is that smooth Dachshunds would occasionally produce puppies which had slightly longer hair than their parents. By selectively breeding these animals, breeders eventually produced a dog which consistently produced long-haired offspring, and the long-haired Dachshund was born. Another theory is that the standard long-haired Dachshund was developed by breeding smooth Dachshunds with various land and water spaniels. The long-haired Dachshund may be a cross among any of the small dog breeds in the spaniel group, including the German Stoeberhund, and the smooth Dachshund.

The wire-haired Dachshund, the last to develop, was bred in the late 19th century. There is a possibility the wire-haired Dachshund was a cross between the smooth Dachshund and various hard-coated terriers and wire-haired pinschers, such as the Schnauzer, the Dandie Dinmont Terrier, the German Wirehaired Pointer, or perhaps the Scottish Terrier.

In art

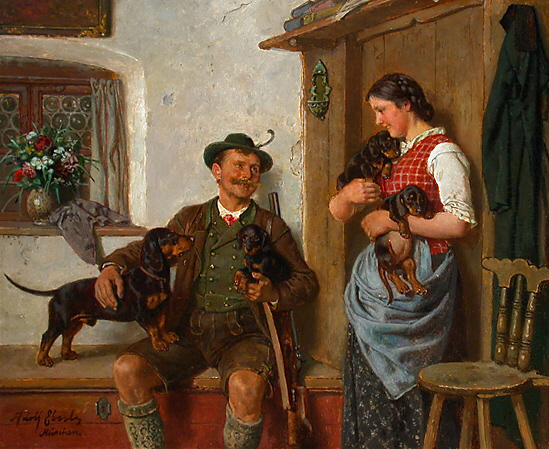
Die Dackelfamilie mit Jäger und Magd (The Dachshund family with Hunter and Maid) by Adolf Eberle

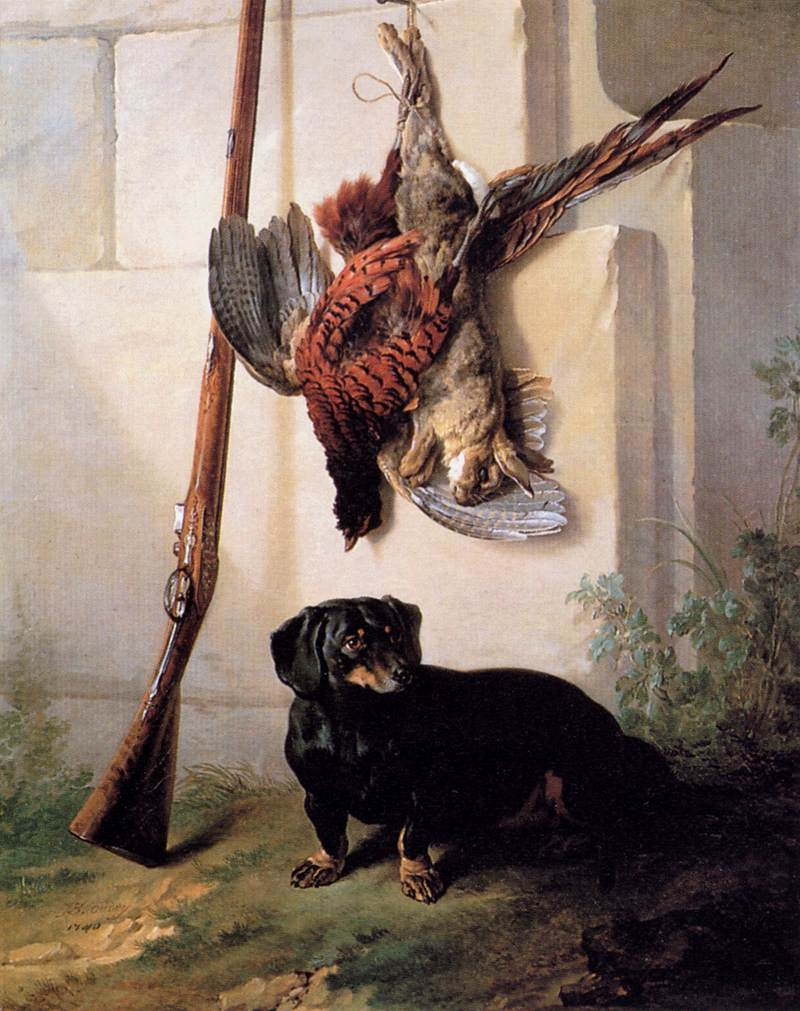
Jean-Baptiste Oudry – Dachshund with Gun and Dead Game, 1740

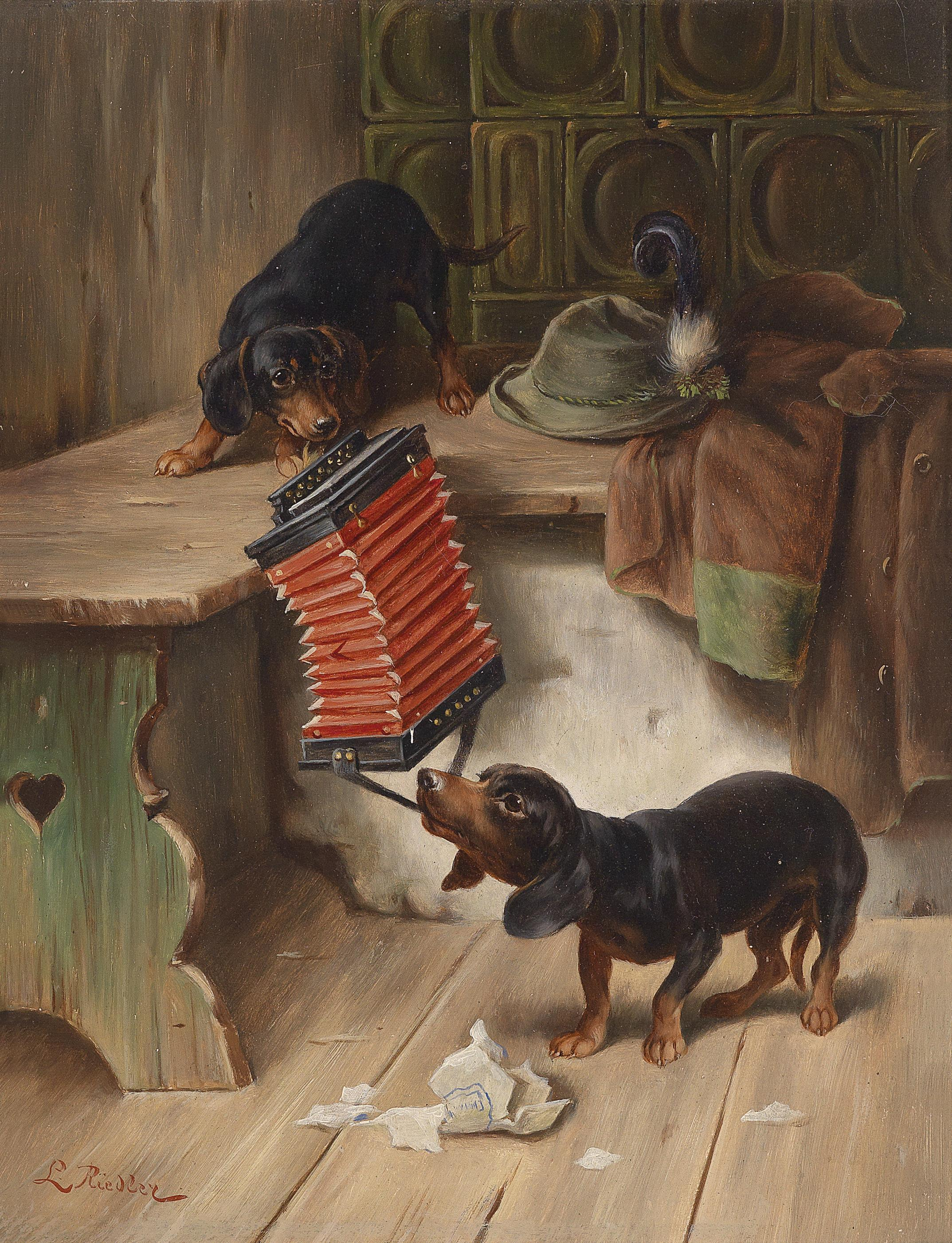
How will it end? Wie wird es enden?, c. 1900

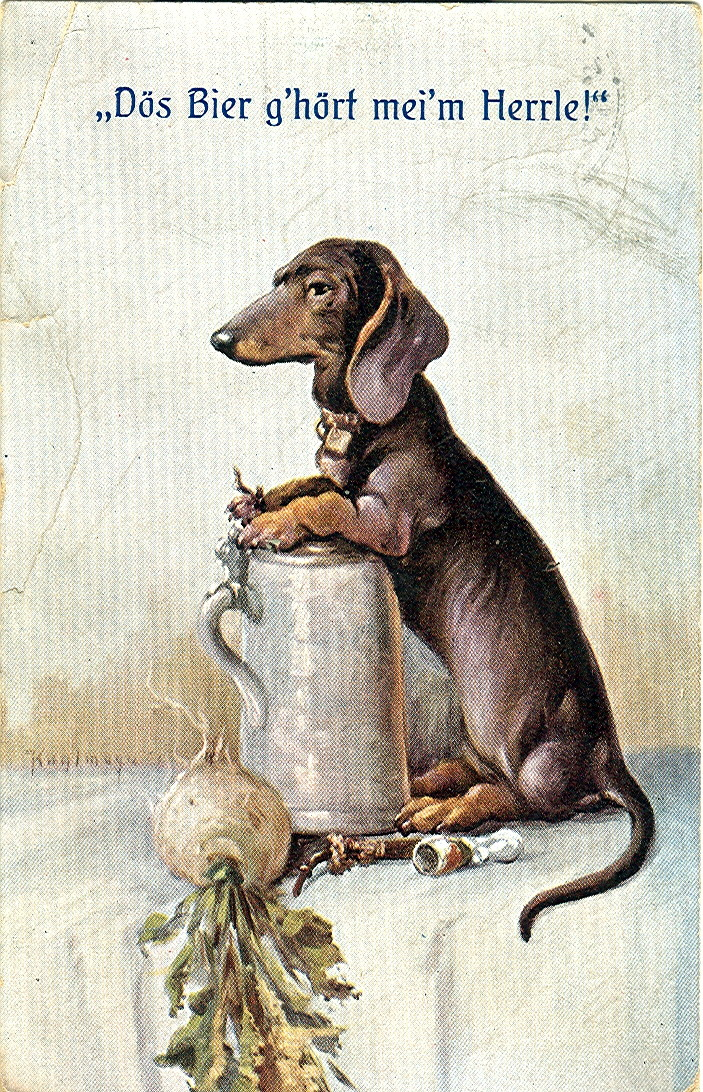
German (Swabian) postcard with inscription "This beer belongs to my master!", c. 1900

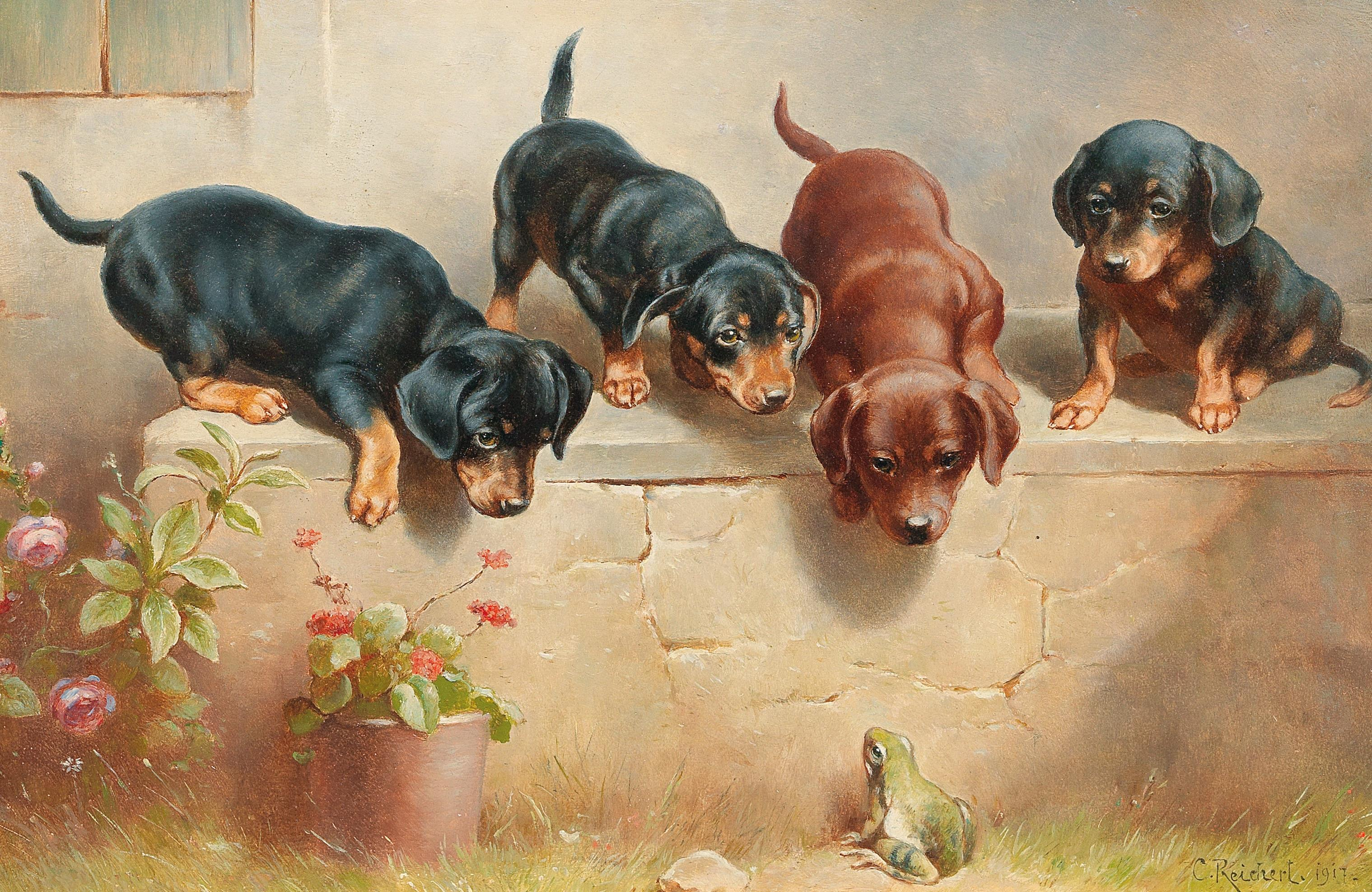
Curious Dachshund Puppies & A Frog. Carl Reichert

=== Symbol of Germany ===
Dachshunds have traditionally been viewed as a symbol of Germany. Political cartoonists commonly used the image of the Dachshund to ridicule Germany. During World War I, the Dachshund's popularity in the United States plummeted because of this association. As a result, they were often called "liberty hounds", just as "liberty cabbage" became a term for sauerkraut mostly in North America. The stigma of the association was revived to a lesser extent during World War II, though it was comparatively short-lived. Kaiser Wilhelm II and German field marshal Erwin Rommel were known for keeping Dachshunds.

Owing to the association of the breed with Germany, as well as its particular popularity among dog keepers in Munich at the time, the Dachshund was chosen as the first official mascot for the 1972 Summer Olympics in Munich, with the name Waldi.

In the German sitcom Hausmeister Krause, the main protagonist, Dieter Krause, is portrayed as a typical German square and fuddy-duddy, who embodies many German stereotypes, and his obsession for Dachshunds is one of them. The important role of Dachshunds in the series even led to a new rise in popularity of Dachshunds in Germany.

== Classification ==
While classified in the hound group or scent hound group in the United States and Great Britain, the breed has its own group in the countries which belong to the Fédération Cynologique Internationale (World Canine Federation). Many Dachshunds, especially the wire-haired subtype, may exhibit behavior and appearance similar to the terrier group of dogs. An argument can be made for the scent (or hound) group classification because the breed was developed to use scent to trail and hunt animals, and probably descended from the Saint Hubert Hound like many modern scent hound breeds such as bloodhounds and Basset Hounds; but with the persistent personality and love for digging that probably developed from the terrier, it can also be argued that they could belong in the terrier, or "earth dog", group.

== Characteristics ==
=== Appearance ===
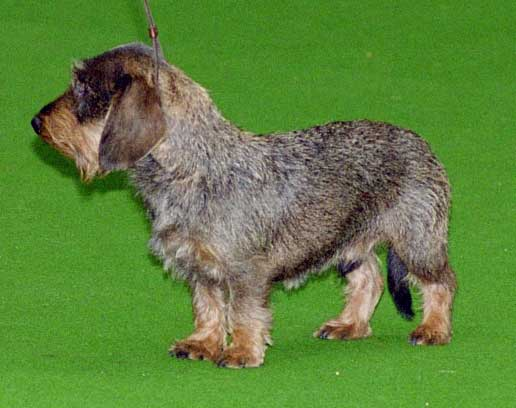
A wire-haired Dachshund

A typical Dachshund is long-bodied and muscular with short stubby legs. Its front paws are disproportionately large, being paddle-shaped and particularly suitable for digging. Its skin is loose enough not to tear while tunneling in tight burrows to chase prey. Its snout is long. Its ears are disproportionately big and droopy.

==== Coat and color ====
There are three Dachshund coat varieties: smooth coat (short hair), long-haired, and wire-haired. Longhaired Dachshunds have a silky coat and short featherings on legs and ears. Wire-haired Dachshunds are the most common coat variety in Germany and the most recent coat to appear in breeding standards. Short-haired Dachshunds have two types of coats, silky and smooth. Silky short hairs have a very shiny, glossy, and soft to the touch coat, while smooth short hairs have more of a coarse and prickly coat. Dachshunds have a wide variety of colors and patterns, the most common one being red. Their base coloration can be single-colored (either red, cream, or brown), tan pointed (black and tan, chocolate and tan, blue and tan, or isabella and tan), and in wire-haired dogs, a color referred to as wild boar. Patterns such as dapple (merle), sable, brindle and piebald also can occur on any of the base colors. Dachshunds in the same litter may be born in different coat colors depending on the genetic makeup of the parents.

The Dachshund Club of America (DCA) and the American Kennel Club (AKC) consider Double Dapple to be out of standard and a disqualifying color in the show ring. Piebald is now a recognized color in the Dachshund Club of America (DCA) breed standard.

Dogs that are double-dappled have the merle pattern of a dapple, but with distinct white patches that occur when the dapple gene expresses itself twice in the same area of the coat. The DCA excluded the wording "double-dapple" from the standard in 2007 and now strictly uses the wording "dapple" as the double dapple gene is commonly responsible for blindness and deafness.

==== Size ====
Dachshunds come in three sizes: standard, miniature, and kaninchen (German for "rabbit"). Although the standard and miniature sizes are recognized almost universally, the rabbit size is not recognized by clubs in the United States and the United Kingdom. The rabbit size is recognized by the Fédération Cynologique Internationale (World Canine Federation) (FCI), which contain kennel clubs from 83 countries all over the world. An increasingly common size for family pets falls between the miniature and the standard size; these are frequently referred to as "tweenies," which is not an official classification.

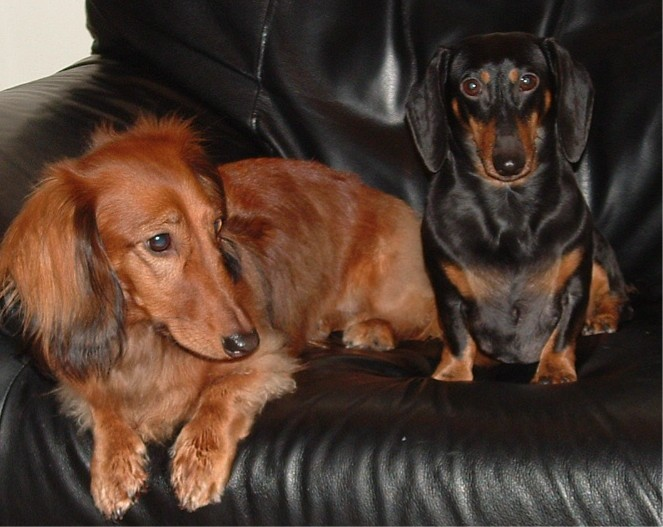
Size difference between a standard (left) and a miniature (right) dachshund

A full-grown standard Dachshund typically weighs 7.5 to 14.5 kg (16 to 32 lb), while the miniature variety normally weighs less than 5.5 kg (12 lb). The kaninchen weighs 3.5 to 5 kg (8 to 11 lb). According to kennel club standards, the miniature (and kaninchen, where recognized) differs from the full-size only by size and weight, thus offspring from miniature parents must never weigh more than the miniature standard to be considered a miniature as well. While many kennel club size divisions use weight for classification, such as the American Kennel Club, other kennel club standards determine the difference between the miniature and standard by chest circumference; some kennel clubs, such as in Germany, even measure chest circumference in addition to height and weight.

==== Eye color ====
Light-colored Dachshunds can sport amber, light brown, or green eyes; however, kennel club standards state that the darker the eye color, the better. Dapple and double dapple Dachshunds can have multi-coloured "wall" eyes with fully blue, partially blue or patched irises owing to the effect of the dapple gene on eye pigmentation expression. "Wall" eye is permissible according to DCA standards but undesirable by AKC standards.

=== Temperament ===
Dachshunds can be stubborn and refuse commands, especially if chasing a small animal which they have a propensity for. As Dachshunds were originally used as badger hunters they have a keen sense for chasing smaller animals. Dachshunds are often stubborn, making them a challenge to train.

Being the owner of Dachshunds, to me a book on dog discipline becomes a volume of inspired humor. Every sentence is a riot. Some day, if I ever get a chance, I shall write a book, or warning, on the character and temperament of the Dachshund and why he can't be trained and shouldn't be. I would rather train a striped zebra to balance an Indian club than induce a Dachshund to heed my slightest command. When I address Fred I never have to raise either my voice or my hopes. He even disobeys me when I instruct him in something he wants to do.

— E. B. White

Dachshunds are rated in the intelligence of dogs as an average working dog with a persistent ability to follow trained commands 50% of the time or more. They can have a loud bark. Some bark quite a lot and may need training to stop, while others will not bark much at all. Dachshunds can be standoffish toward strangers. A Japanese study found the Miniature Dachshund to have higher rates of refusing to move whilst on a walk, barking at outside noises whilst inside, barking at strangers visiting their home, separation anxiety, inappropriate elimination (faecal and urinary incontinence), hesitancy to approach unknown humans and canines, and aggression towards family members, highlighting the breed's stubbornness and aggression.

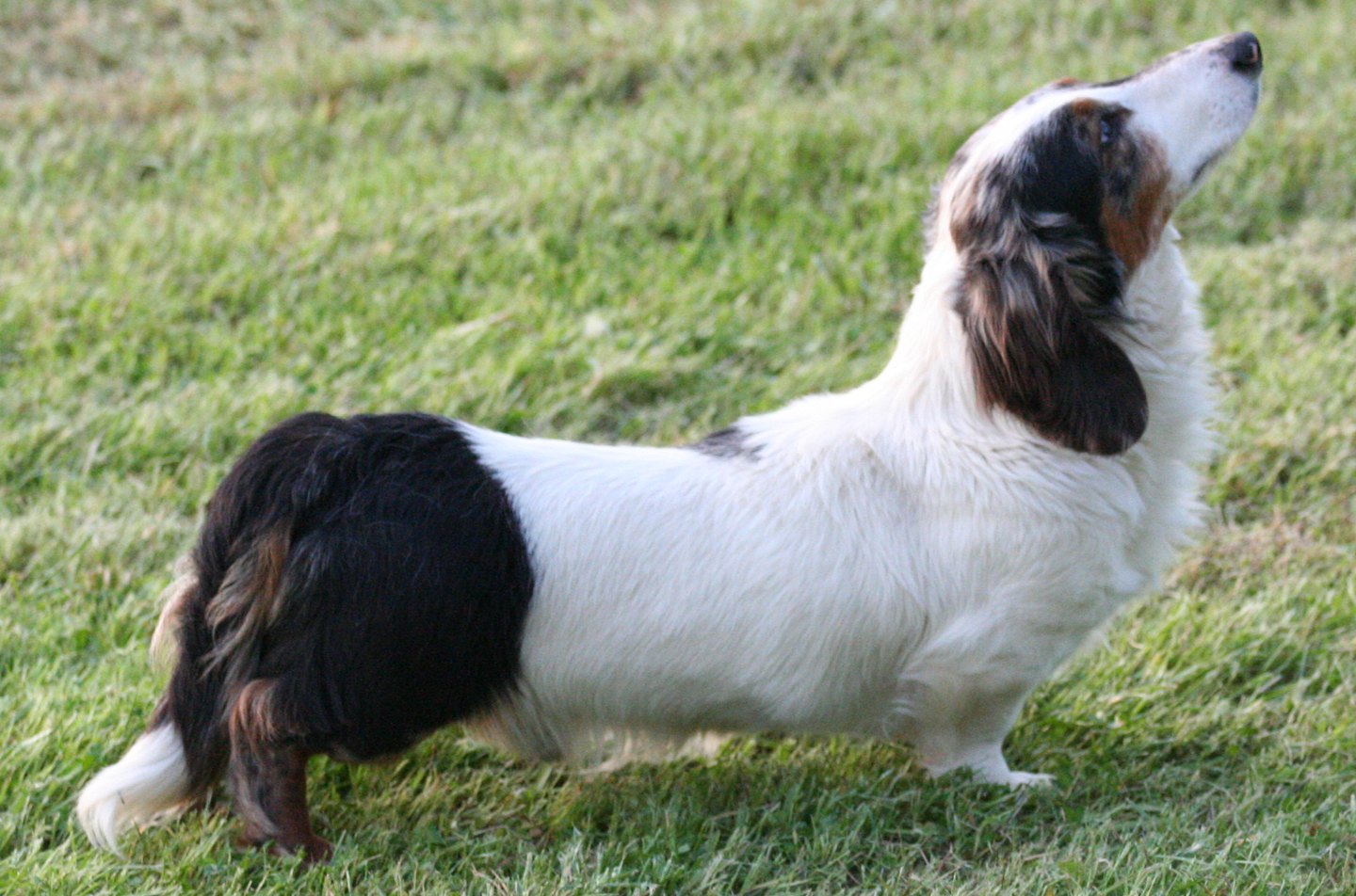
A double dapple long-haired Dachshund

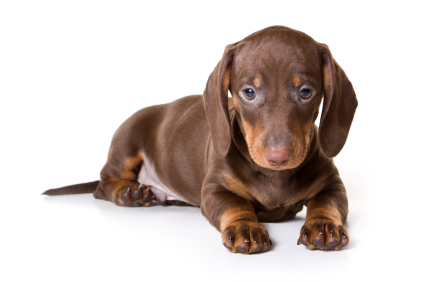
Dachshund puppy

According to the American Kennel Club's breed standards, "the Dachshund is clever, lively and courageous to the point of rashness, persevering in above and below ground work, with all the senses well-developed. Any display of shyness is a serious fault." Their temperament and body language give the impression that they do not know or care about their relatively small size. Like many small hunting dogs, they will challenge a larger dog. Indulged Dachshunds may become snappy or extremely obstinate.

A 2008 University of Pennsylvania study of 6,000 dog owners who were interviewed indicated that dogs of smaller breeds were more likely to be "genetically predisposed toward aggressive behaviour". Dachshunds were rated the most aggressive, with 20% having bitten strangers, as well as high rates of attacks on other dogs and their owners. The study noted that attacks by small dogs were unlikely to cause serious injuries and because of this were probably under-reported.

== Health ==
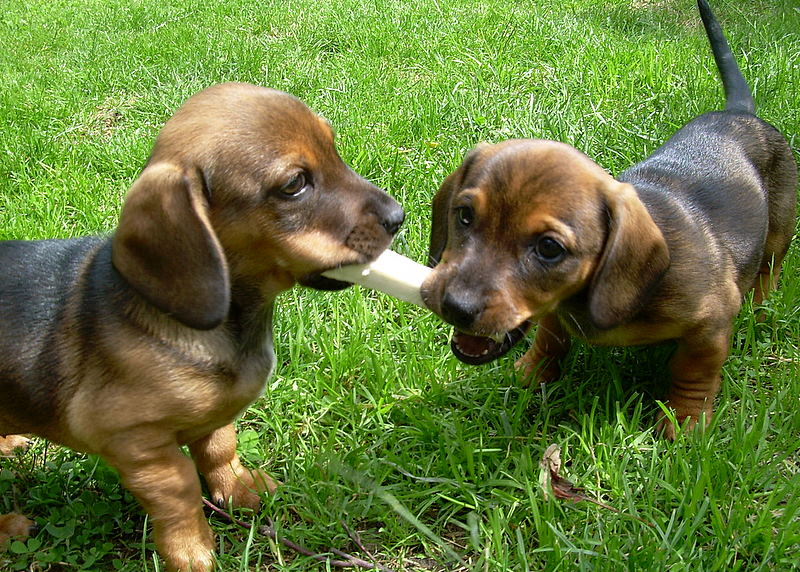
Two Dachshund puppies

The breed is prone to spinal problems, especially intervertebral disk disease (IVDD), due in part to an extremely long spinal column and short rib cage. The risk of injury may be worsened by obesity, jumping, rough handling, or intense exercise, which place greater strain on the vertebrae. About 20–25% of Dachshunds will develop IVDD. Dachshunds with a number of calcified intervertebral discs at a young age have a higher risk of developing disc disease in later life. In addition, studies have shown that development of calcified discs is highly heritable in the breed. An appropriate screening programme for IVDD has been identified by Finnish researchers and a UK IVDD screening programme has been developed for breeders with the aim to reduce prevalence of spinal problems. A study done in 2024 about 154 female Dachshunds undergoing surgery for IVDD (intervertebral disc) extrusion found no significant differences in age or disease severity among the dogs that were neutered before 12 months, after 12 months or older, or ones that remain unneutered.

Treatment consists of combinations of crate confinement and courses of anti-inflammatory medications (steroids and non-steroidal anti-inflammatory drugs like carprofen and meloxicam), or chronic pain medications, like tramadol. Serious cases may require surgery to remove the troublesome disk contents. A dog may need the aid of a cart to get around if paralysis occurs.

A minimally invasive procedure called "percutaneous laser disk ablation" has been developed at the Oklahoma State University Veterinary Hospital. As of 2003, the procedure was used in clinical trials only on Dachshunds that had suffered previous back incidents.

In addition to back problems, the breed is prone to patellar luxation where the kneecap can become dislodged. Dachshunds may also be affected by osteogenesis imperfecta (brittle bone disease). The condition seems to be mainly limited to wire-haired Dachshunds, with 17% being carriers. A genetic test is available to allow breeders to avoid breeding carriers to carriers. In such pairings, each puppy will have a 25% chance of being affected.

In some double dapples, there are varying degrees of vision and hearing loss, including reduced or absent eyes. Not all double dapples have problems with their eyes and/or ears, which may include degrees of hearing loss, full deafness, malformed ears, congenital eye defects, reduced or absent eyes, partial or full blindness, or varying degrees of both vision and hearing problems; but heightened problems can occur owing to the genetic process in which two dapple genes cross, particularly in certain breeding lines. Dapple genes, which are dominant genes, are considered "dilution" genes, meaning whatever color the dog would have originally carried is lightened, or diluted, randomly; two dominant "dilution" genes can cancel each other out, or "cross", removing all color and producing a white recessive gene, essentially a white mutation. When occurring genetically within the eyes or ears, this white mutation can be detrimental to development, causing hearing or vision problems.

Other Dachshund health problems include hereditary epilepsy, granulomatous meningoencephalitis, dental issues, Cushing's syndrome, thyroid and autoimmune problems, various allergies and atopies, and various eye conditions including cataracts, glaucoma, progressive retinal atrophy, corneal ulcers, nonulcerative corneal disease, sudden acquired retinal degeneration, and cherry eye. Dachshunds are also 2.5 times more likely than other breeds of dogs to develop patent ductus arteriosus, a congenital heart defect. Dilute color dogs (Blue, Isabella, and Cream) are very susceptible to color dilution alopecia, a skin disorder that can result in hair loss and extreme sensitivity to sun. Since the occurrence and severity of these health problems is largely hereditary, breeders are working to eliminate these.

Factors influencing the litter size of puppies and the proportion of stillborn puppies per litter were analyzed in normally sized German Dachshunds. The records analyzed contained data on 42,855 litters. It was found that as the inbreeding coefficient increased, litter size decreased and the percentage of stillborn puppies increased, thus indicating inbreeding depression. It was also found that young and older dams had smaller litter sizes and more stillborn puppies than middle-aged dams.

A study in Japan found the Miniature Dachshund to have lower rates of glaucoma than other breeds, with 2.4% of cases belonging to the breed but the breed making up 10.1% of visits to the veterinary hospital.

Dachshunds are predisposed to hypothyroidism.

=== Life expectancy ===
A 2018 study in Japan of pet cemetery data put the Miniature Dachshund life expectancy at 13.9 years compared to 13.7 overall and 15.1 for crossbreeds. A 2024 study in the UK found a life expectancy of 13.2 years for the breed compared to an average of 12.7 for purebreeds and 12 for crossbreeds with the Miniature Dachshund found to have a life expectancy of 14 years. A 2024 Italian study found a life expectancy of 11.5 years for the breed compared to 10 years overall. A 2005 Swedish study of insurance data found 28% of Dachshund died by the age of 10, less than the overall rate of 35% of dogs dying by the age of 10.

== Sports ==
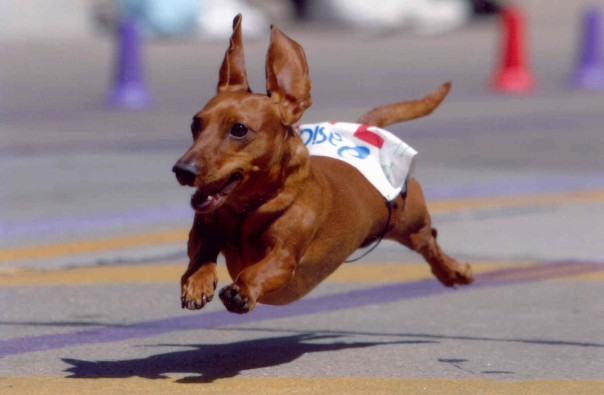
A smooth Dachshund in an organized race

Some people train and enter their Dachshunds to compete in Dachshund races, such as the Wiener Nationals. Several races across the United States routinely draw several thousand attendees.

Despite the popularity of these events, the Dachshund Club of America opposes "wiener racing", as many greyhound tracks use the events to draw large crowds to their facilities. The DCA is also worried about potential injuries to dogs, owing to their predisposition to back injuries. Another favorite sport is earthdog trials, in which Dachshunds enter tunnels with dead ends and obstacles attempting to locate either an artificial bait or live but caged (and thus protected) rats.

== Dackel versus Teckel ==
In Germany, Dachshunds are widely called Dackel (both singular and plural). Among hunters, they are mainly referred to as Teckel. There are kennels which specialize in breeding hunting Dachshunds, the so-called jagdliche Leistungszucht ("hunting-related performance breeding") or Gebrauchshundezucht ("working dog breeding"), as opposed to breeding family dogs. Therefore, it is sometimes incorrectly believed that Teckel is either a name for the hunting breed or a mark for passing the test for a trained hunting dog (called "VGP", "Verband-Gebrauchsprüfung") in Germany.

== Popularity ==
Dachshunds are one of the most popular dogs in the United States, ranking 12th in the 2018 AKC registration statistics. They are popular with urban and apartment dwellers, ranking among the top 10 most popular breeds in 76 of 190 major US cities surveyed by the AKC.

There are organized local Dachshund clubs in most major American cities, including New York, New Orleans, Portland, Los Angeles, and Chicago. As of 2024, the American Kennel Club found the Dachshund to be the 6th most popular dog breed.

== Notable dogs and owners ==
- John F. Kennedy bought a Dachshund puppy while touring Europe in 1937 for his then-girlfriend Olivia. The puppy, named Dunker, never left Germany after Kennedy started to get allergic reactions.
- Grover Cleveland, the 22nd and 24th President, had a Dachshund in the White House.
- William Randolph Hearst was an avid lover of Dachshunds. When his own Dachshund Helena died, he eulogized her in his "In The News" column.
- Fred, E. B. White's Dachshund, appeared in many of his famous essays.
- Chekhov kept two Dachshunds, Bromide and Quinine; their statues have been installed at his former estate in the village of Melikhovo.
- Lump (pronounced [lʊmp]; German for "rascal"), a Dachshund owned by David Douglas Duncan, lived with Pablo Picasso for several years and is thought to have inspired some of his artwork. The book Picasso & Lump recounts the relationship between the artist and the dog.
- Jack Ruby, the killer of Lee Harvey Oswald, had a Dachshund named Sheba, which he often referred to as his wife. At the time he murdered Oswald, he had four of them—although he once had as many as 10.

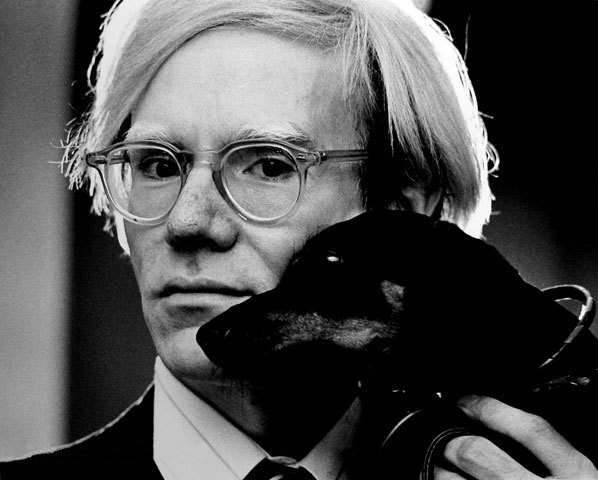
Andy Warhol and Archie by Jack Mitchell, 1973

- Andy Warhol and Jed Johnson had a pair of Dachshunds, Archie and Amos, whom Warhol depicted in his paintings. Archie was a socialite, frequently accompanying Warhol on trips to Europe and appearing alongside him in advertisements.
- Rock musician Lou Reed had a pair of Dachshunds, Duke and Baron.
- Stanley and Boodgie, immortalized on canvas by owner David Hockney, and published in the book David Hockney's Dog Days.
- Wadl and Hexl, Kaiser Wilhelm II's famous ferocious pair. Upon arriving at Archduke Franz Ferdinand's country seat, Konopiště castle, on a semi-official visit, they promptly proceeded to do away with one of the Austro-Hungarian heir presumptive's priceless golden pheasants, thereby almost causing an international incident. Another one of his beloved Dachshunds, Senta, is currently buried at Huis Doorn, Wilhelm's manor in the Netherlands.
- In Zelenogorsk, Russia, a parade of Dachshunds pass by a Dachshund monument every July 25 to commemorate the day the city was founded.
- Joe was the Dachshund of General Claire Lee Chennault, commander of the Flying Tigers and then the China Air Task Force of the US Army Air Forces, and became the mascot of those organizations.
- Maxie, a Dachshund owned by actress Marie Prevost, tried to awaken his dead mistress, who was found with small bites on her legs. Maxie's barking eventually summoned neighbors to the scene. The incident inspired the 1977 Nick Lowe song "Marie Prevost".
- Liliane Kaufmann, wife of Edgar J. Kaufmann who commissioned the home Fallingwater from Frank Lloyd Wright in 1935, was a well-known breeder and owner of long-haired Dachshunds. At the Fallingwater bookstore, visitors are able to purchase a book titled Moxie, which is about one of the Dachshunds who lived at Fallingwater. Liliane raised long-haired Dachshunds and they traveled from Pittsburgh to Bear Run with her.
- The former Queen of Denmark, Margrethe II, is one of several Danish royals to keep Dachshunds. Margrethe of Denmark has a particular fondness of Dachshunds and has kept many throughout her life. Her 80th birthday, celebrated in 2020, was marked by posing with one of her favourites (Lilia) on the grounds of Fredensborg Castle.
- Obie is a Dachshund who became infamous for his obesity, weighing as much as 77 pounds (35 kilograms), more than twice a normal-weight standard Dachshund. He reached his target weight of 28 lb (13 kg) in July 2013.
- Carole Lombard and Clark Gable had a Dachshund named Commissioner.
- Crusoe the Celebrity Dachshund gained fame on social media. In 2015, Crusoe came out with his The New York Times best-selling book titled Crusoe: Adventures of the Wiener Dog Extraordinaire!. In 2018, Crusoe came out with another book titled Crusoe: The Worldly Wiener Dog. At the 9th annual Shorty Awards, Crusoe won the best animal category. In 2018, Crusoe won the People's Choice Awards Animal Star of 2018.
- As of 2011, English singer-songwriter Adele has a Dachshund named Louie, after Louis Armstrong.
- Valerie, an 8-pound Dachshund, gained media attention after surviving 529 days in wilderness. In November 2023, Valerie went missing from her owners in Kangaroo Island, South Australia. Despite extensive searches by her owners and locals, she was not found. Approximately 500 days after her disappearance, sightings of Valerie emerged. A volunteer rescue effort was coordinated by conservationists, which spanned more than 1,000 hours and covered more than 3,000 miles to capture the elusive pet dog. Valerie was finally caught alive and well in April 2025. It is hypothesized Valerie has survived remote conditions by subsisting on small carrion and fecal matter.
