= Valerie (dog) =

Australian formerly missing dog

- Species: Canis familiaris
- Breed: Miniature dachshund
- Sex: Female
- Born: 2021 or 2022 (age 3–4)
- Known for: Surviving 529 days on Kangaroo Island
- Owners: Georgia Gardner; Josh Fishlock
- Weight: 5.8 kg (13 lb) (April 2025)
- Height: 15 cm (5.9 in)

Valerie (born 2021 or 2022) is a miniature dachshund who was believed to be missing for 529 days on Kangaroo Island, South Australia between 13 November 2023 and 25 April 2025. Taken on a holiday to the island with her owners Georgia Gardner and Josh Fishlock, Valerie escaped her pen at a campsite at Stokes Bay and ran into the scrub when camp-goers attempted to recapture her from under a car. She was confirmed to be alive in February 2025 through first-hand accounts and a photograph. Following an estimated 1,000 hours of volunteer effort, she was captured by Kangala Wildlife Rescue with a remote-activated cage around 30 miles from where she had gone missing, before being returned to Gardner and Fishlock in May 2025.

The manner in which Valerie survived on Kangaroo Island is debated. During her time on the island, University of Sydney professor Paul McGreevy as well as Kangala speculated that Valerie survived by eating carrion and fecal matter, and drinking water from a dam, though local residents of the island including its mayor believe that Valerie may have been fed by a human. When captured, she had a shiny coat and had gained 1.8 kilograms (4.0 lb) on the island, having arrived there at a weight of 4 kg (8.8 lb).

Following her recapture, Valerie has been made official ambassador for dog product company The Paws Room, and has been the subject of a themed beer. An Australian Story documentary about Valerie's escape and capture, titled Dog Gone: The Hunt for Valerie, was released in October 2025.

== Biography ==
Valerie was given to Georgia Gardner as a gift following her college graduation during the COVID-19 pandemic. Garner lives in Albury in New South Wales, Australia with her partner Josh Fishlock. The couple worked in Broken Hill. Gardner would later state that Valerie was "anxiously attached" to her and Fishlock, and "was not a very outside, rough-and-tough dog", instead describing her as an "absolute princess". She had never slept outside. Valerie weighed under 4 kilograms (8.8 lb) prior to her escape, and was 15 centimetres (5.9 in) in height.

=== Escape on Kangaroo Island ===
Gardner and Fishlock had gone fishing at Stokes Bay on Kangaroo Island when Valerie escaped

In November 2023, when Valerie was one year old, Gardner and Fishlock took Valerie with them on their holiday to Kangaroo Island, in South Australia. The island is 1,700 square miles (4,400 km^{2}) in size, and is home to 5,000 residents. It hosts as many as two species of venomous snake (black tigers and pygmy copperheads), as well as wedge-tailed eagles which can hunt wallabies, possums and lambs.

On 13 November, the second day of their trip, Gardner and Fishlock made the decision to go fishing at a beach nearby their campsite at Stokes Bay. At the campsite, they placed Valerie in a pen, accompanied by food and toys. At the time, Valerie was microchipped, and was wearing a pink collar on which was affixed an AirTag. Valerie ripped the pen open, escaped, and hid under a parked four-wheel drive car. Nearby campers noticed this and attempted to capture her, being fearful that she could be run over, but this caused her to run into the scrub. 500 metres away, a motorist saw Valerie run into another property. Around fifteen minutes after Gardner and Fishlock had left Valerie in the pen, a woman approached the couple to tell them Valerie had escaped.

==== Search ====
After attempting to find Valerie until dark, Gardner and Fishlock went to a cafe where its owner Matt Johnson posted about the incident on the cafe's Facebook page. Continuing to search, they encountered property manager Joe Sattin, who attempted to help them find the dog in an all-terrain vehicle. The couple searched for Valerie for a week, aided by locals on the island. Kangala Wildlife Rescue, a local nonprofit organization headed by Jared and Lisa Karran, volunteered to search for Valerie. On the fifth day of the search, the couple were forced to leave the island on the ferry so they could to their jobs in Broken Hill. Fishlock left a pair of his underwear on a fence post in the hopes that Valerie would recognise his scent. Local 50-year-old nurse Debbie Farnden made use of her own two dachshunds, Winnie and Ferb, to attempt to find Valerie.

Six to eight months following Valerie's escape, locals on Kangaroo Island began reporting the presence of a lost dog wearing a pink collar, though these claims lacked evidence. Sharon Tucker, a farmer, spotted Valerie on her farm but could not get close enough; she contacted Gardner and Fishlock about this, but the couple was sceptical of Tucker's legitimacy and "didn't want to get [their] hopes up".

In February 2025, over 450 days after Valerie had gone missing, a friend of Tucker and her fellow farm owner Ivan Smith took a photograph of a small black dog running across one of the farm's fields. Kangala have since said that this photograph "sparked the entire search." They publicised the knowledge that Valerie was alive on 21 March, and set up and monitored traps over a wide area. The search area was narrowed down to the Stokes Bay area by March 2025. Making use of tuna and roast chicken to entice Valerie. The first images of Valerie captured on Kangala cameras were taken on 24 March. International news outlets picked up on the story around this time. On 26 March, Kangala noted that Valerie was last seen 15 kilometres (9.3 mi) from her escape at the Stokes Bay campsite. Kangala noted that "She runs at the first sign of humans or vehicles, and despite the best efforts of dedicated Island locals, Valerie has been impossible to catch." Professor Paul McGreevy, in reference to this, noted that dachshunds tend to have significant back pain, speculating that this was possibly causing Valerie's reticence to interact with humans.

By April 2025, by which time Valerie had been missing for more than 500 days, some residents of Kangaroo Island suggested that she was now feral, and should be euthanised. On 9 April 2025, Kangala posted their camera footage of Valerie inside a cage at their "trap site", and on 15 April 2025, they posted further footage of Valerie sniffing around a trap and playing with a food box. Kangala stated that she was becoming more confident entering the area for food. Her visits took place only once every five or six days, and other wildlife kept entering the traps, making her capture difficult. In the mail, Gardner sent several of Valerie's old toys as well as a sweaty t-shirt to attract Valerie to the cage. While Lisa Karran has stated that she intended to coax Valerie into returning to domestic life slowly by reminding her of her former life, there was some criticism on social media accusing Kangala of lengthening the time taken to catch Valerie for publicity.

==== Capture ====
Valerie eventually became comfortable inside the cage, and was recorded playing with a teddy bear. At about 12:30 pm on 25 April 2025, Valerie unusually visited the cage during the daytime; Jared Karran pressed the button to activate the cage's remote-activated door, powered by a car's electric window motor, trapping Valerie. She subsequently curled up and went to sleep. Lisa and Jared approached the cage, Valerie came up to meet them, and was fitted with a pink anti-escape harness. Kangala announced the successful capture of Valerie the same day, 529 days after she had first escaped. This took place around 30 miles from where she had first gone missing, and ended an estimated 1,000 hours of volunteer effort and 5,000 kilometres (3,100 mi) travelled on the island to catch her.

=== Post-escape ===
After giving Valerie time to "decompress" before transporting her, Kangala returned Valerie to Gardner and Fishlock; she reunited with her owners on 6 May, and subsequently returned to domestic life with no issues, joining Gardner and Fishlock's other pets; rescue cat Lucy, red heeler Mason, and Dorothy, another dachshund the couple had obtained since losing Valerie.

By October 2025, Valerie was the official ambassador for The Paws Room, a dog product company. Valerie did a meet and greet for the company, raising money for the pet adoption service Pound Paws. A Valerie-themed beer was launched. An unauthorised book was written about Valerie. On 6 October, the Australian Broadcasting Corporation released an Australian Story documentary about Valerie's escape and capture, titled Dog Gone: The Hunt for Valerie. A company selling GPS trackers for dogs sponsored Valerie, jokingly titling her Chief Escape Officer.

== Debate on survival and health ==
During Valerie's time on the island, it was speculated by Jared Karran that she had survived on roadkill and dam water, while the University of Sydney professor Paul McGreevy suggested she most likely ate carrion and faecal material. Wildlife guide Craig Wickham concurred that she may have survived on roadkill. Once captured, it was found that Valerie had gained 1.8 kilograms (4.0 lb) in weight since her escape, weighing 5.8 kg (13 lb), and struggled to fit into her old harness. A vet found she was in "perfect health", according to Kangala, and her coat was shiny. This raised questions over whether Valerie had in fact been cared for during her time on Kangaroo Island, with the island's mayor Michael Pengilly stating that "ninety percent of people that have spoken to me have said someone must have been feeding and watering her for her to survive". Lisa Karran put forward that Valerie may have been groomed by possums or cats which exist on the island. The Guardian stated that Kangala had been reluctant to engage with most media outlets on the matter.
