= Blanche Reineke =

American photographer

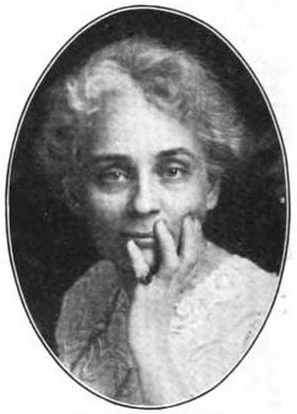
- Blanche Reineke, from a 1913 publication
- Born: Emma Blanche Reineke; January 8, 1863; Illinois, U.S.
- Died: August 9, 1935 (aged 72); Shawnee, Kansas, U.S.

Emma Blanche Reineke (January 8, 1863 – August 9, 1935) was an American photographer based in Kansas City, Missouri. She was elected president of the Women's Federation of the Photographers Association of America in 1914, but declined the position.

== Early life ==
Emma Blanche Reineke was born in Illinois, the daughter of John Reineke (1835–1924) and Eliza Jane Buckley Reineke (1844–1939). Her father was born in Germany, and her mother was born in Kentucky. She trained to be a school teacher, and later studied photography in New York.

== Career ==
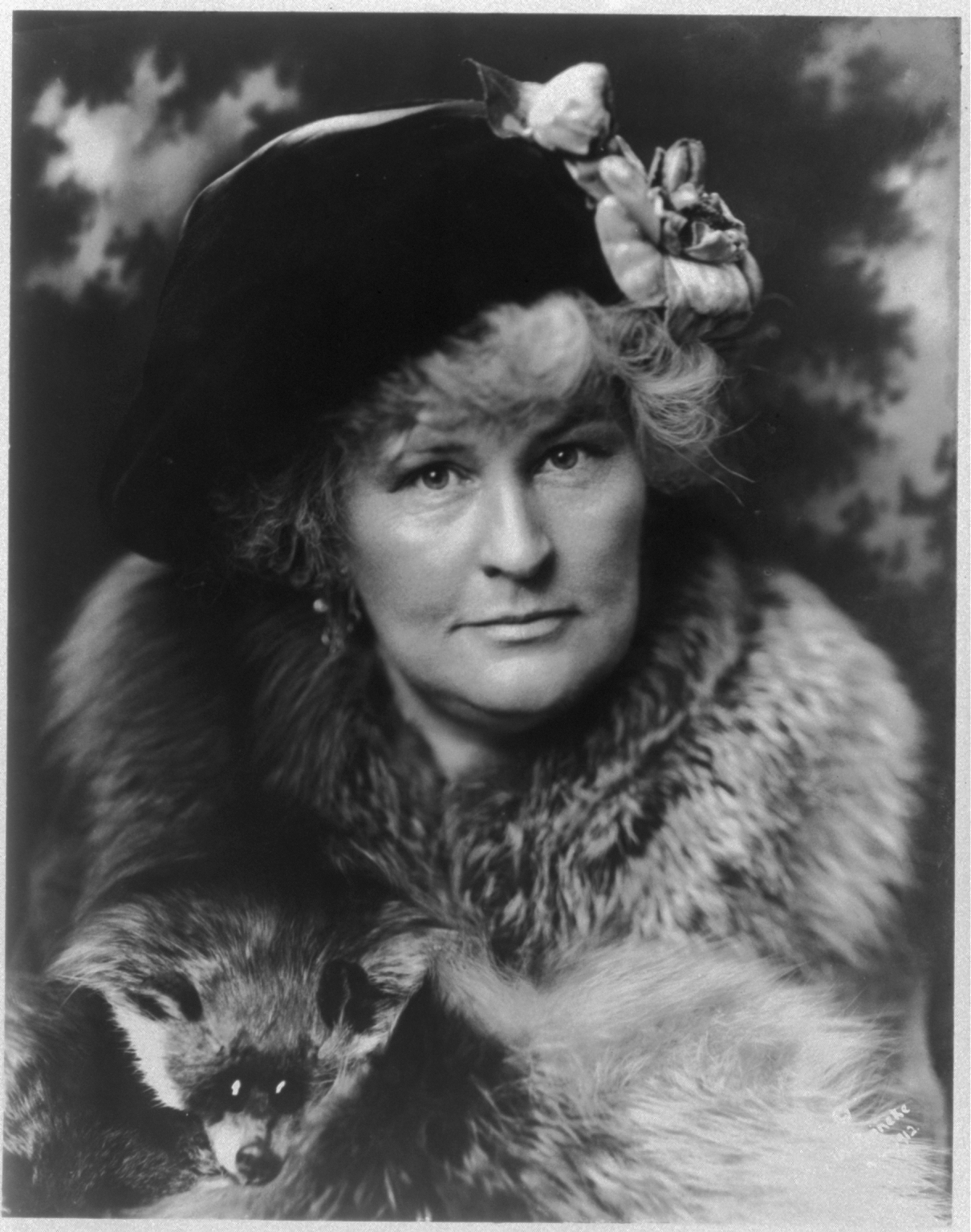
A portrait of writer Winifred Black (1869-1936) by Blanche Reineke

Reineke taught school in Girard, Illinois and Ottawa, Kansas as a young woman. She left teaching to become photographer E. H. Corwin's assistant. By 1903, she was speaking about photography on the Chautauqua platform. She built her own business in Kansas City, Missouri, as a portrait photographer specializing in children's portraits. "I never attempt to pose children before the camera," she explained, "because their every movement is full of unconscious, unaffected grace." Portraits of children by Reineke were exhibited in the Temple of Childhood at the Panama–Pacific International Exposition in San Francisco in 1915.

Reineke was elected president of the Women's Federation of the Photographers Association of America in 1913 and 1915, but declined the position both times. She accepted a position as regional chairman instead; she served as press representative in 1914, and as vice president of the federation in 1912 and 1917. In 1921, she was elected third vice president of the National Photographers Association.

== Personal life ==
Reineke was a charter member of the Women's Dining Club of Kansas City. She was president of the Kansas City Women's Commercial Club. In 1910, she attended the Third National Conservation Congress, held in Washington, D.C. In 1922, she was living on a small farm in Shawnee, Kansas. Emma Blanche Reineke died in Shawnee, Kansas in 1935, aged 72 years.
