= David Douglas Duncan =

American photojournalist (1916–2018)

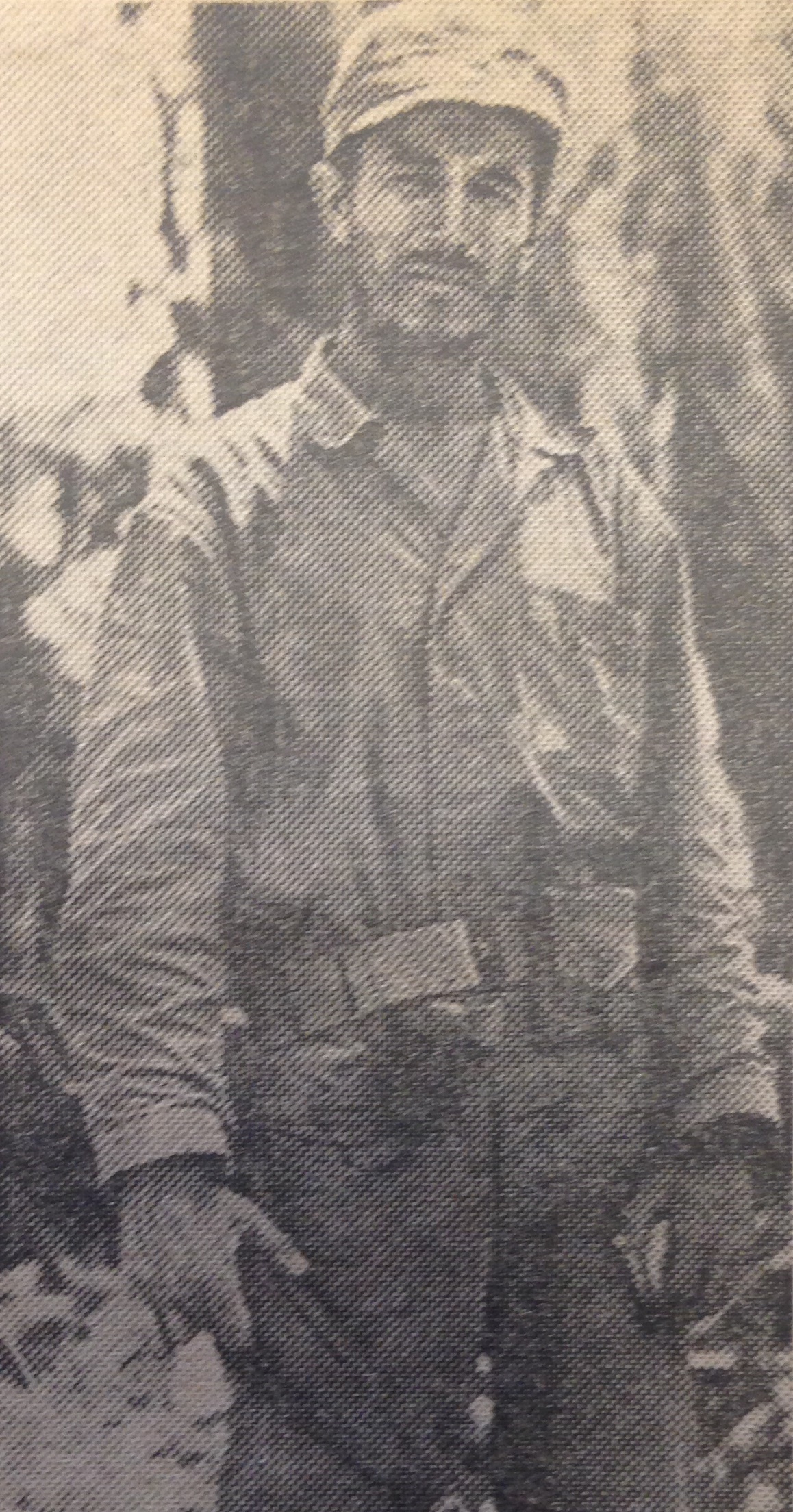
- Duncan in 1945
- Born: January 23, 1916; Kansas City, Missouri, U.S.
- Died: June 7, 2018 (aged 102); Grasse, France
- Military career
- Allegiance: United States
- Branch: United States Marine Corps
- Conflicts: World War II; *Battle of Bougainville; Korean War; *Battle of Pusan Perimeter; *Battle of Chosin Reservoir
- Other work: Photographer

David Douglas Duncan (January 23, 1916 – June 7, 2018) was an American photojournalist, known for his dramatic combat photographs, as well as for his extensive domestic photography of Pablo Picasso and his wife Jacqueline.

== Childhood and education ==
Duncan was born in Kansas City, Missouri, where his childhood was marked by interest in the outdoors, helping him earn the rank of Eagle Scout in the Boy Scouts at a relatively young age. A lantern-slide presentation by big-game hunter and physician Richard Lightburn Sutton, at Duncan's elementary school in Kansas City inspired an early interest in photography and world travel. Duncan briefly attended the University of Arizona, where he studied archaeology. While in Tucson, he inadvertently photographed John Dillinger trying to get into a hotel. Duncan eventually continued his education at the University of Miami, where he graduated in 1938, having studied zoology and Spanish. It was in Miami that his interest in photojournalism began in earnest. He worked as picture editor and photographer of the university paper.

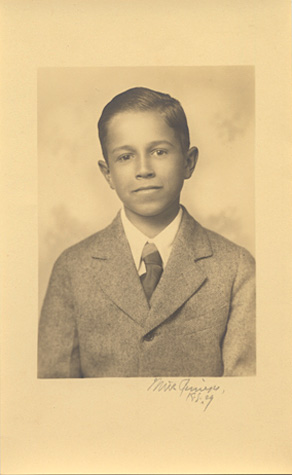
Duncan in eighth grade, photographed by Blanche Reineke

== Career ==
His career as a photojournalist began when he took photographs of a hotel fire in Tucson, Arizona, while he was then studying archaeology at nearby University of Arizona. His photos included one of a hotel guest who made repeated attempts to go back into the burning building for his suitcase. That photo proved to be newsworthy when the guest turned out to have been notorious bank robber John Dillinger and the suitcase to have contained the proceeds of a bank robbery in which he had shot a police officer. Unfortunately, after the film was turned over to the Tucson Citizen, it was lost forever, and the photos were never printed.

After college, Duncan began to freelance, selling his work to journals such as The Kansas City Star, Life and National Geographic.

After the attack on Pearl Harbor, Duncan joined the Marine Corps, earned an officer's commission, and became a combat photographer. After brief postings in California and Hawaii, he was sent to the South Pacific on assignment when the United States entered World War II. As a second lieutenant, he initially served with Marine Aircraft Group 23 and was later assigned to photograph operations of the South Pacific Combat Air Transport Command. Though combat photographers are often close to the action, they rarely fight. However, in a brief engagement at Bougainville Island, Duncan found himself fighting against the Japanese. Duncan also covered the Battle of Okinawa, and was on board the USS Missouri for the Japanese surrender.

Duncan's wartime photographs were so impressive that after the war he was hired by Life to join its staff at the urging of J. R. Eyerman, Life chief photographer. During his time with Life, Duncan covered many events, including the end of the British Raj in India and conflicts in Turkey, Eastern Europe, Africa, and the Middle East.

Perhaps his most famous photographs were taken during the Korean War. He compiled many of these into a book, This Is War!, (1951), with the proceeds going to widows and children of marines who had been killed in the conflict. Duncan is considered the most prominent combat photographer of the Korean War.

His photo and talk with marines in the Battle of Chosin Reservoir are notable:

"I asked him, 'If I were God, what would you want for Christmas?'" Duncan says. "He just looked up into the sky and said, 'Give me tomorrow.'"

Out of the Vietnam War, Duncan eventually compiled two additional books, I Protest! (1968) and War Without Heroes (1970). Here, Duncan abandoned impartiality and challenged the US government's handling of the war.

Aside from his combat photographs, Duncan is also known for his photographs taken informally at the homes of Pablo Picasso and his second wife Jacqueline Roque, initiated in 1956 on the suggestion of fellow photographer Robert Capa. He published seven books of photographs of Picasso in all. Duncan became a close friend of Picasso and was the only person allowed to photograph many of Picasso's private paintings. Duncan lived in Castellaras, France, close to Mougins, where Picasso spent the last 12 years of his life. Peruvian painter Herman Braun-Vega created several appropriations of Duncan's photographs of Picasso, integrating them into paintings that blend references to art history. In Don Pablo baila un huayno (danza andina de la sierra peruana) bajo la mirada sorprendida de Matisse (Matisse, Picasso, Velázquez, Duncan), Braun-Vega transforms a Duncan photograph showing Picasso dancing in his home in France into a scene where the Spanish artist performs a huayno, a traditional collective dance from the Peruvian Andes. The painter exploits the resemblance between the photographed gesture and that of the huayno, where the man invites the woman to dance, to place Picasso's art on the same level as Peruvian popular culture. Other works incorporating Duncan's photographs include La melancolia de Don Pablo (Velázquez, Rembrandt, Ingres, Duncan) and Laborando con Don Pablo (Velázquez, Ingres, Picasso y Duncan). The artist acknowledges these photographic borrowings by including Duncan's name in the titles of his paintings.

Duncan greatly assisted Nippon Kogaku (Nikon) during its early years, and in 1965 he was presented with the 200,000th Nikon F built in recognition for his use and popularization of their camera.

In 1966 he published Yankee Nomad, a visual autobiography that collected representative photographs from throughout his career. In 2003 this was revised and published under the title of Photo Nomad.

Duncan photographed both the 1968 Democratic and Republican national conventions, and published photographs from those conventions in a coffee-table book titled Self-Portrait U.S.A. in 1969.

Duncan traveled extensively in the Middle East, having been stationed there ten years after World War II for Life. He later published The World of Allah in 1982.

He turned 100 in January 2016 and died in June 2018 in Grasse, France, aged 102.

In 2021 Duncan was posthumously inducted into the International Photography Hall of Fame and Museum.

== Books ==
- This Is War! (1951)
- The Private World of Pablo Picasso (1958)
- The Kremlin (1960)
- Picasso's Picassos (1961)
- Yankee Nomad (1966)
- I Protest! (1968)
- Self-Portrait: USA (1969)
- War Without Heroes (1970)
- Prismatics (1972)
- David Douglas Duncan [portfolio] (1972?)
- Goodbye Picasso (1974)
- The Silent Studio (1976)
- Magic Worlds of Fantasy (1978)
- The Fragile Miracle of Martin Gray (1979)
- Viva Picasso (1980)
- The World of Allah (1982)
- New York/New York (1984)
- Sunflowers for Van Gogh (1986)
- Picasso and Jacqueline (1988)
- A Secret Garden (1992)
- Thor (1993)
- Picasso Paints a Portrait (1996)
- Yo-Yo (1999)
- Faceless (2001)
- Photo Nomad (2003)
- Picasso & Lump (2006)
- Grand Prix of Monaco (2013)
- Yesterday (2016)
- The Forest World of Ann West (2018)
