= Las Meninas (Picasso) =

Series of paintings by Pablo Picasso

- Artist: Pablo Picasso
- Year: 1957
- Type: Oil on canvas
- Location: Museu Picasso

Las Meninas is a series of 58 paintings that Pablo Picasso painted in 1957 by performing a comprehensive analysis, reinterpreting and recreating several times Las Meninas by Diego Velazquez. The suite is fully preserved at the Museu Picasso in Barcelona and is the only complete series of the artist that remains together. This is a very extensive survey work, which consists of 45 performances of the original picture, 9 scenes of a dove, 3 landscapes, and a portrait of his second wife Jacqueline.

Picasso himself understood this series as a whole, and as such gave them to the museum in Barcelona in May 1968, in memory of Jaume Sabartés, who died the same year. Picasso's famous phrase said to Sabartés in 1950:

If someone want to copy Las Meninas, entirely in good faith, for example, upon reaching a certain point and if that one was me, I would say: what if you put them a little more to the right or left? I'll try to do it my way, forgetting about Velázquez. The test would surely bring me to modify or change the light because of having changed the position of a character. So, little by little, that would be a detestable Meninas for a traditional painter, but would be my Meninas.

— Picasso, 1950

== The suite ==
#	Registry	Title	Date	Format	size (cm)	Zervos XVII
1	MPB 70.433	Las Meninas (conjunt)	17/08/1957	Oil on canvas	194 x 260	351
2	MPB 70.434	Las Meninas (infanta Margarita María)	20/08/1957	Oil on canvas	100 x 81	353
3	MPB 70.435	Las Meninas (María Agustina Sarmiento)	20/08/1957	Oil on canvas	46 x 37.5	352
4	MPB 70.436	Las Meninas (infanta Margarita María)	21/08/1957	Oil on canvas	100 x 81	356
5	MPB 70.437	Las Meninas (infanta Margarita María)	22/08/1957	Oil on canvas	33 x 24	354
6	MPB 70.438	Las Meninas (infanta Margarita María)	26/08/1957	Oil on canvas	41 x 32,5	357
7	MPB 70.439	Las Meninas (infanta Margarita María)	27/08/1957	Oil on canvas	40,5 x 33	355
8	MPB 70.440	Las Meninas (infanta Margarita María)	27/08/1957	Oil on canvas	33 x 24	361
9	MPB 70.441	Las Meninas (infanta Margarita María)	27/08/1957	Oil on canvas	33 x 24	359
10	MPB 70.442	Las Meninas (infanta Margarita María)	28/08/1957	Oil on canvas	18 x 14	358
11	MPB 70.443	Las Meninas (infanta Margarita María)	28/08/1957	Oil on canvas	18 x 14	360
12	MPB 70.444	Las Meninas (infanta Margarita María)	04/09/1957	Oil on canvas	35 x 27	365
13	MPB 70.445	Las Meninas (composició central)	04/09/1957	Oil on canvas	35 x 27	363
14	MPB 70.446	Las Meninas (conjunt)	04/09/1957	Oil on canvas	46 x 37,5	364
15	MPB 70.447	Las Meninas (infanta Margarita María)	05/09/1957	Oil on canvas	35 x 27	366
16	MPB 70.448	Las Meninas (infanta Margarita María)	06/09/1957	Oil on canvas	41 x 32,5	367
17	MPB 70.449	Las Meninas (infanta Margarita María)	06/09/1957	Oil on canvas	46 x 37,5	362
18	MPB 70.450	Els colomins	06/09/1957	Oil on canvas	100 x 80	394
19	MPB 70.451	Els colomins	06/09/1957	Oil on canvas	100 x 80	395
20	MPB 70.452	Els colomins	07/09/1957	Oil on canvas	33 x 24	398
21	MPB 70.453	Els colomins	07/09/1957	Oil on canvas	100 x 80	396
22	MPB 70.454	Els colomins	07/09/1957	Oil on canvas	80 x 100	No catalogat
23	MPB 70.455	Els colomins	11/09/1957	Oil on canvas	129 x 97	397
24	MPB 70.456	Els colomins	14/09/1957	Oil on canvas	100 x 80	399
25	MPB 70.457	Els colomins	12/09/1957	Oil on canvas	100 x 80	400
26	MPB 70.458	Els colomins	12/09/1957	Oil on canvas	145 x 113	401
27	MPB 70.459	Las Meninas (infanta Margarita María)	14/09/1957	Oil on canvas	100 x 81	368
28	MPB 70.460	Las Meninas (conjunt sense Velázquez)	15/09/1957	Oil on canvas	129 x 161	369
29	MPB 70.461	Las Meninas (María Agustina Sarmiento i infanta Margarita María)	17/09/1957	Oil on canvas	32,5 x 41	371
30	MPB 70.462	Las Meninas (conjunt sense Velázquez)	17/09/1957	Oil on canvas	129 x 161	370
31	MPB 70.463	Las Meninas (conjunt)	18/09/1957	Oil on canvas	129 x 161	372
32	MPB 70.464	Las Meninas (conjunt)	19/09/1957	Oil on canvas	161 x 129	373
33	MPB 70.465	Las Meninas (conjunt)	02/10/1957	Oil on canvas	161 x 129	374
34	MPB 70.466	Las Meninas (conjunt)	03/10/1957	Oil on canvas	129 x 161	375
35	MPB 70.467	Las Meninas (Isabel de Velasco)	09/10/1957	Oil on canvas	65 x 54	377
36	MPB 70.468	Las Meninas (María Agustina Sarmiento)	09/10/1957	Oil on canvas	65 x 54	376
37	MPB 70.469	Las Meninas (María Agustina Sarmiento i infanta Margarita María)	10/10/1957	Oil on canvas	92 x 73	379
38	MPB 70.470	Las Meninas (María Agustina Sarmiento)	10/10/1957	Oil on canvas	73 x 55	378
39	MPB 70.471	Las Meninas (María Agustina Sarmiento)	10/10/1957	Oil on canvas	115 x 89	380
40	MPB 70.472	El Piano	17/10/1957	Oil on canvas	130 x 96	404
41	MPB 70.473	Las Meninas (Nicolasito Pertusato)	24/10/1957	Oil on canvas	61 x 50	382
42	MPB 70.474	Las Meninas (Isabel de Velasco, María Bárbola i Nicolasito Pertusato)	24/10/1957	Oil on canvas	130 x 96	383
43	MPB 70.475	Las Meninas (Isabel de Velasco, María Bárbola i Nicolasito Pertusato)	24/10/1957	Oil on canvas	130 x 96	384
44	MPB 70.476	Las Meninas (Isabel de Velasco, María Bárbola i Nicolasito Pertusato)	24/10/1957	Oil on canvas	130 x 96	381
45	MPB 70.477	Las Meninas (Isabel de Velasco i María Bárbola)	08/11/1957	Oil on canvas	130 x 96	385
46	MPB 70.478	Las Meninas (infanta Margarita María i Isabel de Velasco)	15/11/1957	Oil on canvas	130 x 96	386
47	MPB 70.479	Las Meninas (conjunt sense Velázquez)	15/11/1957	Oil on canvas	130 x 96	387
48	MPB 70.480	Las Meninas (conjunt sense Velázquez ni María Bárbola)	17/11/1957	Oil on canvas	35 x 27	388
49	MPB 70.481	Las Meninas (María Agustina Sarmiento)	17/11/1957	Oil on canvas	24 x 19	389
50	MPB 70.482	Las Meninas (Isabel de Velasco)	17/11/1957	Oil on canvas	24 x 19	392
51	MPB 70.483	Las Meninas (Isabel de Velasco)	17/11/1957	Oil on canvas	27 x 22	393
52	MPB 70.484	Las Meninas (Isabel de Velasco)	17/11/1957	Oil on canvas	24 x 19	390
53	MPB 70.485	Las Meninas (Isabel de Velasco i Nicolasito Pertusato)	17/11/1957	Oil on canvas	24 x 19	391
54	MPB 70.486	Paisatge	02/12/1957	Oil on canvas	14 x 17,5	407
55	MPB 70.487	Paisatge	02/12/1957	Oil on canvas	14 x 18	406
56	MPB 70.488	Paisatge	02/12/1957	Oil on canvas	16 x 22	405
57	MPB 70.489	Retrat de Jacqueline	03/12/1957	Oil on canvas	116 x 89	408
58	MPB 70.490	Las Meninas (Isabel de Velasco)	30/12/1957	Oil on canvas	33 x 24	444

== Exhibits ==
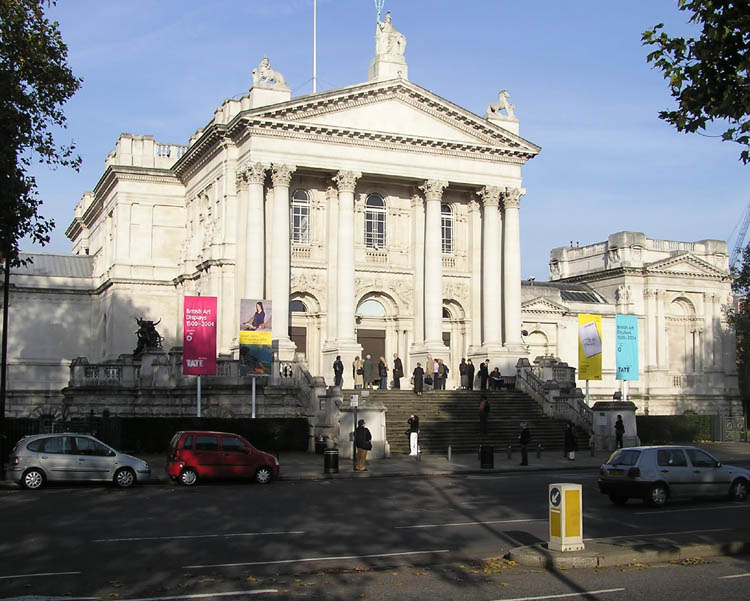
Tate Gallery

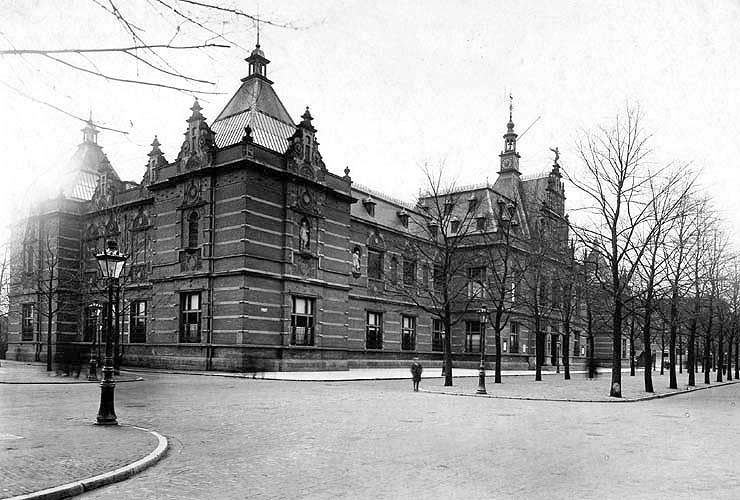
Stedelijk Museum

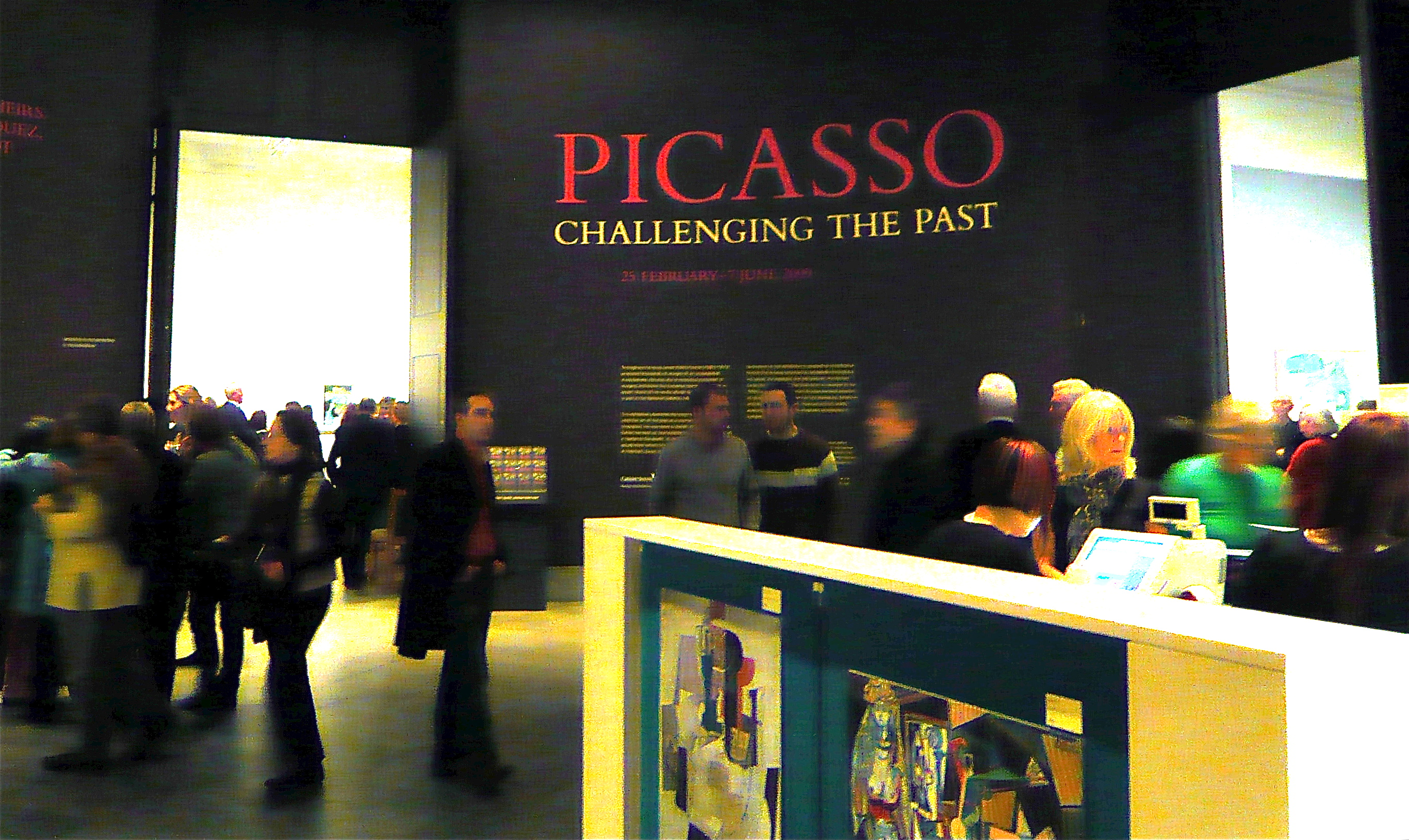
Picasso: Challenging the past exhibit in London

The Suite has been shown in the following exhibitions:

- 1959 - Les Menines, Galerie Louise Leiris, Paris.
- 1960 - Picasso, Tate Gallery, London.
- 1964 - Pablo Picasso. Exhibition Japan 1964, National Museum of Modern Art, Tokyo, Japan.
- 1964 - Pablo Picasso. Exhibition Japan 1964, National Museum of Modern Art, Kyoto, Japan.
- 1964 - Pablo Picasso. Exhibition Japan 1964, Nagoya City Art Museum, Japan.
- 1966 - 1967 - Hommage à Pablo Picasso, Grand Palais, Paris.
- 1967 - Stedelijk Museum Amsterdam.
- 1968 - Museu Picasso, Barcelona.
- 2008 - Forgetting Velázquez: Between 16 May and 28 September 2008, an exhibition at the Museu Picasso in Barcelona, which explains the influence of Velázquez and Picasso's work on other contemporary artists. The exhibition, divided into two sections, brought together works of the seventeenth century Spanish painters such as Velázquez, Juan Carreño de Miranda and Juan Bautista del Mazo, and some of the Las Meninas by Picasso next to more contemporary productions, with works by artists such as Francisco Goya, Michael Craig-Martin, Josep Maria Sert, Richard Hamilton and Thomas Struth. It was curated by Gertje Utley and Malén Gual.

However, there are several works from theSuite that have been part of other exhibitions, such as:

- 1980 - Picasso: A Retrospective, MoMA, Nova York.
- 1981 - Picasso 1881-1973. Exposición Antológica, Museo Español de Arte Contemporáneo, Madrid.
- 1985 - La peinture après 1940. Stedelijk Museum, Amsterdam
- 1988 - Picasso in the Soviet Union. Pushkin Museum, Moscou
- 2006 - Picasso. Tradición y vanguardia. Museo Nacional del Prado, Madrid
- 2008 - Picasso et les Maîtres. Grand Palais, Paris
- 2009 - Picasso: Challenging the past. National Gallery of London
- 2010 - Picasso: Peace and Freedom. Tate Liverpool

== Other versions ==
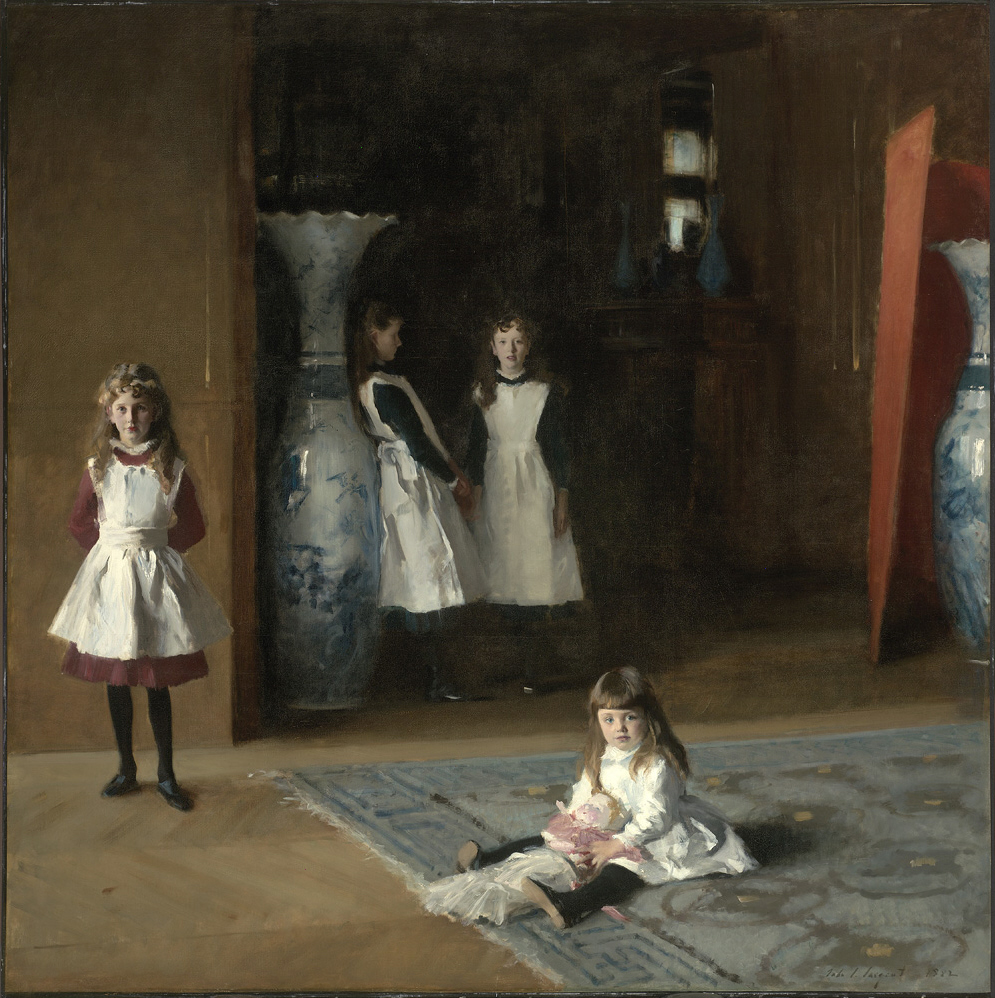
The Daughters of Edward Darley Boit by John Singer Sargent

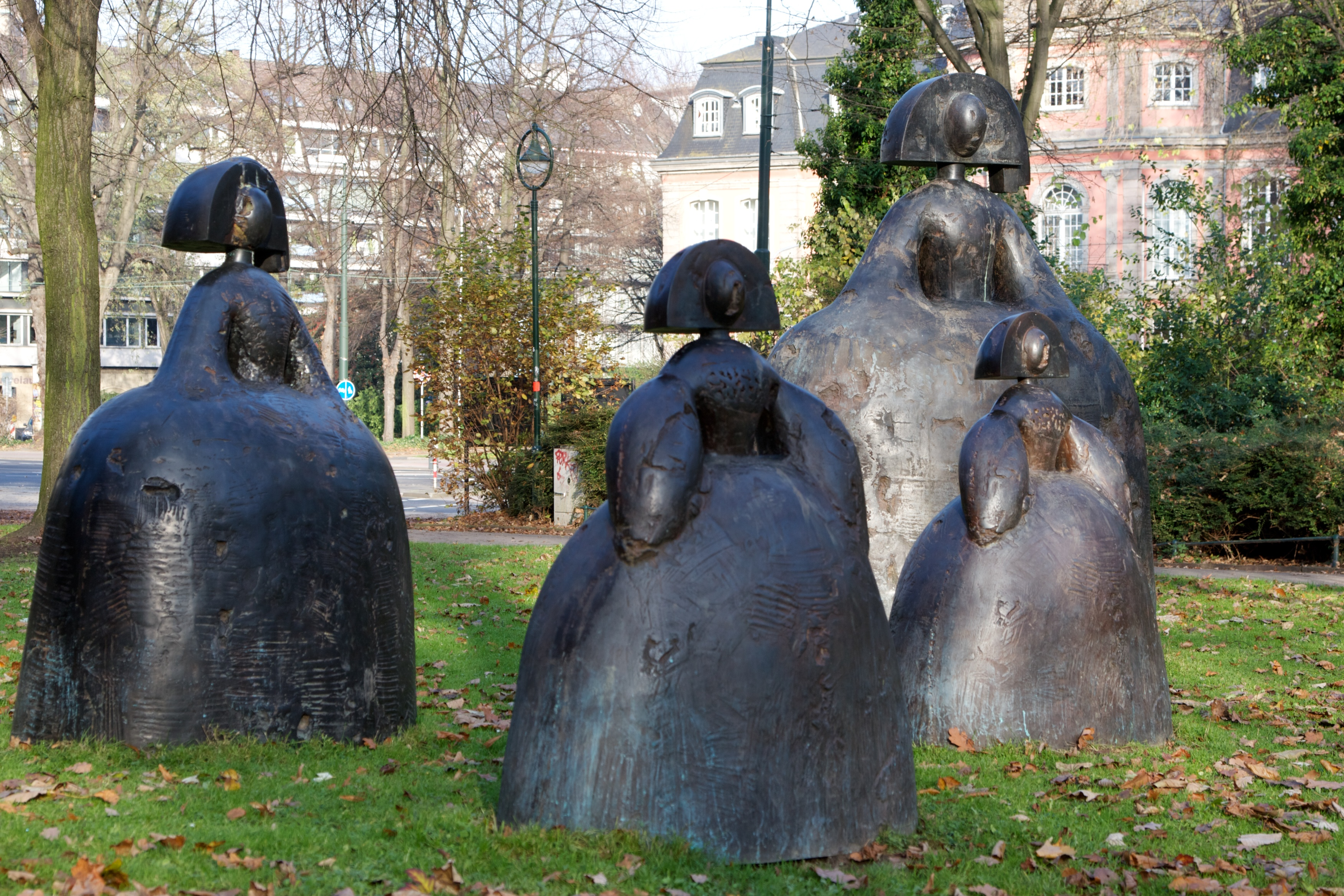
Meninas by Manolo Valdés

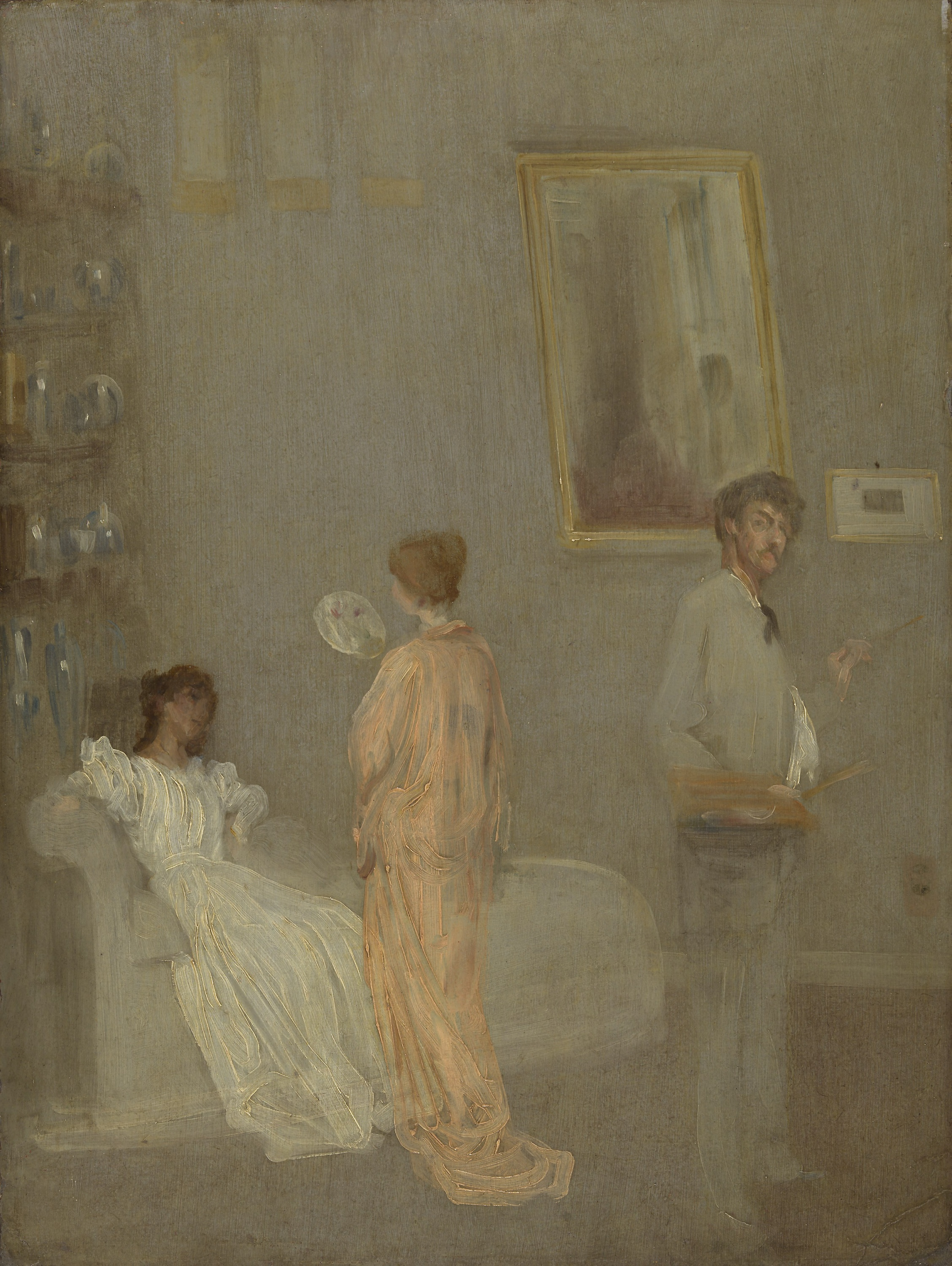
Whistler in his studio by James Abbott McNeill Whistler

Velázquez's Las Meninas has served as inspiration not only to Picasso. The first follower of Velazquez was certainly his son-in-law Juan Bautista del Mazo, court painter to Philip IV in 1661. In the portrait of the Infanta Margarita of Spain (1666), the placement of Charles II and the dwarf Mari Bárbola in the background recalls Las Meninas by Velazquez. Listed here are some other works of artists who have created versions of Las Meninas throughout art history:

- Claudio Bravo, La vista
- Herman Braun-Vega decided to work on Las Meninas after visiting Picasso Museum in Barcelona in 1968 :
  - Velázquez mis à nu accompagné des menines (1968), Museum of Antioquia
  - Velásquez Going to His Easel (From the series Velázquez Stripped Bare) (1968), Blanton Museum of Art
  - Les invités sur l'herbe d'après Vélasquez, Manet et Picasso (1970), Musée d'Art Moderne de Paris
  - ¡Caramba! (Cézanne, Goya, Ingres, Matisse, Picasso, Rembrandt, Vélasquez) (1983), private collection
  - Il est interdit de s'arrêter (Velazquez) (1984), private collection
  - Hotel du Sud (Vélasquez, Ingres, Manet et Matisse) (1985), private collection
  - Dual insight into the West (Velazquez and Picasso) (1987), private collection
  - La familia Informal (Vélasquez, Goya, Picasso) (1992), Ralli Museum (Marbella)
  - Concierto en el mercado (Vélasquez) (1997), private collection
  - Juan Pareja revisiting Picasso Meninas (Velazquez) (2000), private collection
- Louis Cane, Meninas squatting (1982), private collection
- Philippe Comar, Las Meninas (1978), Centre Georges Pompidou
- Equipo Crónica, El recinte (1971), private collection
- Salvador Dalí, Velázquez pintant la infanta Margarida amb les llums i les ombres de la seva pròpia glòria (1958), Salvador Dalí Museum
- Edgar Degas, Variation on Velázquez's Las Meninas (1857), Neue Pinakothek
- Antonio de Felipe, In-Fanta de llimona II (1992), Iria Souto Catoira collection
- Luca Giordano, Hommage to Velázquez (National Gallery of London
- Alberto Gironella, Cambra Oscura (1975), private collection
- Francisco de Goya, Las Meninas (1780–85) Biblioteca Nacional de España
- Richard Hamilton, Interior II (1964) Tate
- Richard Hamilton, Las Meninas of Picasso (1973) Tate
- Yasumasa Morimura, Daughter of Art History (Princess A), private collection
- Vik Muniz, Las Meninas by Velazquez (the chocolate paintings)(2002)
- Jorge Oteiza, Hommage to Las Meninas (1958), Fundació Juan March
- Giulio Paolini, Contemplator Enim VI (fuori l'autore) (1991)
- Antonio Saura, Infanta i Saba (1962)
- Josep Maria Sert, Figurí per a Las Meninas (1916), Fundación Juan March
- Soledad Sevilla, Las Meninas Núm. IX (1981-1983)
- John Singer Sargent, The Daughters of Edward Darley Boit (1882), Museum of Fine Arts, Boston.
- Thomas Struth, Museo del Prado 6 (2005), private collection
- Franz von Stuck, Family group (1909), Royal Museums of Fine Arts of Belgium
- Eve Sussman, 89 segons at the Alcázar (2004), private collection
- Manolo Valdés, Reina Marianna (1989), private collection
- Jeff Wall, Picture for Women (1979), Centre Georges Pompidou
- James Abbott McNeill Whistler, Whistler in his studio (1865)
- Joel-Peter Witkin, Las Meninas. New Mexico (1987)

== Bibliography ==
- Ainaud de Lasarte, Joan (1968). Las Meninas: catálogo. Barcelona: Ajuntament de Barcelona. Museu Picasso.
- Brown, Jonathan (1986). Velázquez. Pintor y cortesano. New Haven: Alianza Editorial. Velázquez: Painter and Courtier. New Haven and London: Yale University Press, 1986. ISBN 0-300-03466-0
- Brown, Jonathan, ed. (1999). Picasso y la Tradición española. Hondarribia: Nerea. p. 127. ISBN 84-89569-27-4.
- Calvo Serraller, Francisco; Giménez, Carmen (2006). Picasso, tradición y vanguardia. Madrid: Museo Nacional del Prado / Museo Nacional Centro de Arte Reina Sofía. pp. 300–317, 302, 306.
- Cirici, Alexandre de (1986). Una lectura de Les Menines de Picasso. Barcelona: Serra d'Or nºVIII.
- Galassi, Susan Grace (1996). Picasso's variations on the Masters: confrontations with the past. Nova York: Harry N. Abrams. fig. 6-4, p. 155.
- Gual, Malén (7 July 2009). "El com i el perquè de la nova presentació de Las Meninas". Museu Picasso Barcelona. Archived from the original on September 11, 2009.
- Julián, Inmaculada (1992). "Temas y modelos en la obra de Picasso". In Universitat de Barcelona. Departament d'Art (ed.). D'Art 1992 Art, Bellessa, Coneixement. Barcelona: Publicacions Universitat de Barcelona.
- Leiris, Michel (1959). Picasso, Les Menines 1957 (in French). París: Galerie Louise Leiris.
- Leymarie, Jean (1966). Hommage à Pablo Picasso: peintures. Grand Palais, París: Réunion des Musées Nationaux.
- Museu Picasso, catàleg de pintura i dibuix. Barcelona: Ajuntament de Barcelona. 1984. p. 23, 696-719.
- Oblidant Velázquez. Las Meninas. Barcelona: Museu Picasso, Ajuntament de Barcelona. 2008. ISBN 978-84-9850-090-5.
- Otras Meninas. Barcelona: Siruela. 1995. ISBN 978-84-7844-221-8.
- Palau i Fabre, Josep (1981). El secret de Les Menines de Picasso. Barcelona: Polígrafa. fig. 1, p. 20. ISBN 84-343-0342-6.
- Penrose, Roland (1960). Picasso [at Tate Gallery]: the Arts Council of Great Britain 1960. Londres: Lund Humphries. núm. 202, p. 59, fig. 49a.
- Rafart i Planas, Claustre (2001). Las Meninas de Picasso. Barcelona: Meteora. ISBN 84-95623-14-5. Translated by Valerie Collins as Picasso's Las Meninas. Meteroa, 2001. ISBN 84-95623-15-3
- Rubin, William Stanley, ed. (1980). Pablo Picasso: A Retrospective. New York: Museum of Modern Art. p. 430. ISBN 978-87-07-05288-1.
- Sabartés, Jaume (1959). Picasso, Las Meninas y la vida. Barcelona: Editorial Gustavo Gili. fig. 1, p. 25.
- Trione, Debra J. (1994). "Las Meninas" again in 1957: Picasso's variations on a theme [tesi doctoral], Ann Arbor. Umi Research Press.
- Walther, Ingo F. (1992). "Por Ejemplo: Las Meninas 1957". Pablo Picasso 1881-1973, tomo II (in Catalan). Köln: Bebedikt Yaschen. ISBN 3-8228-0672-2.
- Zervos, Christian (1996). Pablo Picasso: vol. 17, oeuvres de 1956 à 1957. París: Cahiers d'Art. núm. 351, p. 11.
