= 1653 in art =

Events from the year 1653 in art.

== Events ==
- Architect and painter Lambert van Haven begins a 16-year period of travelling in Europe.
- Construction of the Taj Mahal mausoleum at Agra in India is completed, probably to a design by Ustad Ahmad Lahauri, together with the Moti Masjid (Pearl Mosque) in Agra Fort.

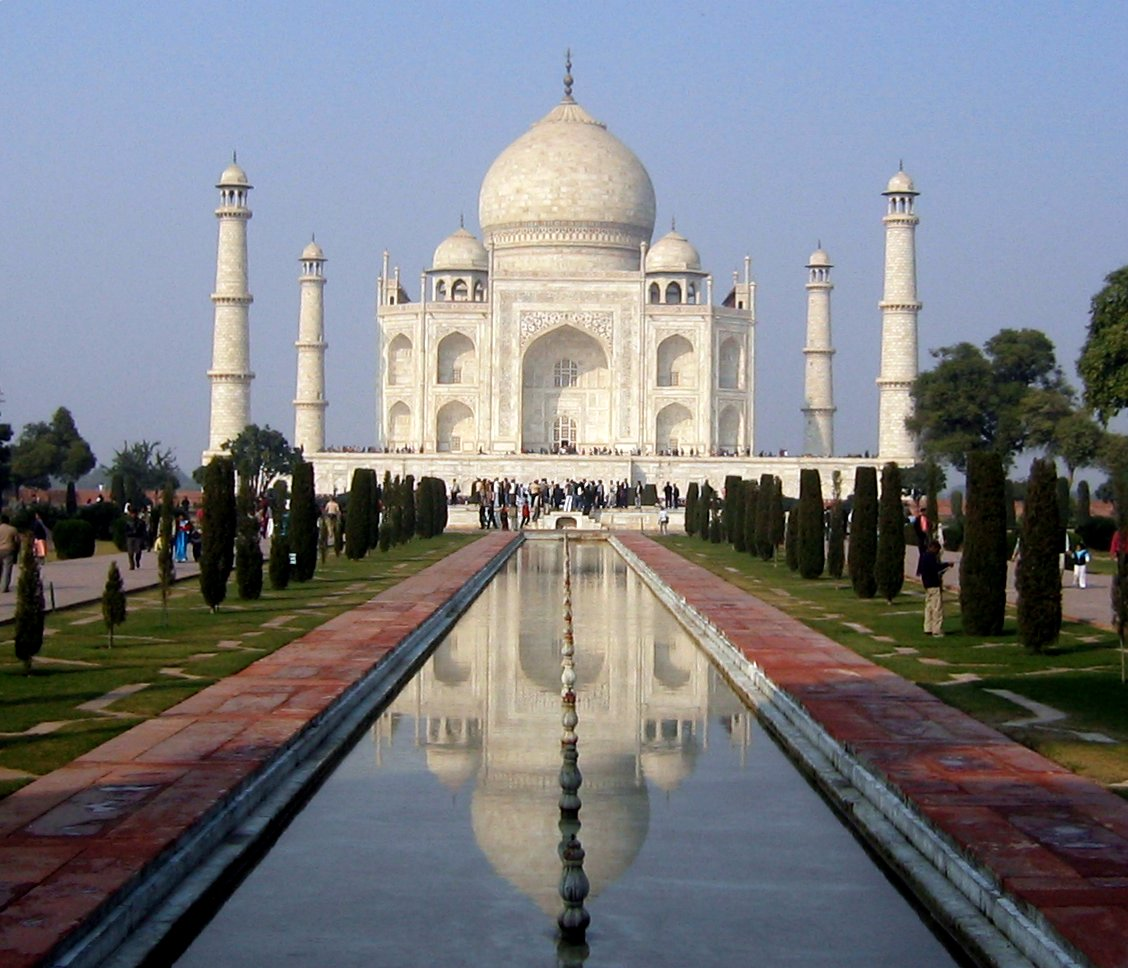
Taj Mahal completed

== Works ==
=== Paintings ===
- Guercino - The Martyrdom of Saint Catherine
- Claude Lorrain - The Adoration of the Golden Calf
- Nicolaes Maes - Abraham Dismissing Hagar and Ishmael
- Rembrandt van Rijn - Aristotle Contemplating a Bust of Homer
- Diego Velázquez
  - Portrait of the Infanta Maria Theresa of Spain
  - Portrait of Mariana of Austria (original version, Museo del Prado, 1652–53)
- Jan van Kessel - series of insects and fruit

=== Sculpture ===
- Alessandro Algardi - Fuga d'Attila relief (St. Peter's Basilica, Rome)

== Births ==
- January - Nicolas Fouché, French painter (died 1733)
- January 23 - Giovanni Girolamo Bonesi, Italian painter (died 1725)
- February 1 - Felix Meyer, Swiss painter and engraver (died 1713)
- May 13 - Giuseppe Maria Mazza, Bolognese Rococo sculptor (died 1741)
- October 20 - Charles-François Poerson, French painter (died 1725)
- December 21 - Tommaso Aldrovandini, Italian painter (died 1736)
- date unknown
  - Sébastien Barras, French painter and engraver (died 1703)
  - Carel de Vogelaer, Dutch still life painter (died 1695)
  - Jacques-Philippe Ferrand, French miniaturist and painter in enamel (died 1732)
  - Marcellus Laroon, Dutch painter and engraver, active in England (died 1702)
  - Angelo Massarotti, Italian painter active in his native Cremona (died 1723)
  - Kanō Tanshin, Japanese painter (died 1718)
  - Sante Vandi, Italian portrait painter (died 1716)
- probable
  - Bonaventura Lamberti, Italian painter, active mainly in Rome (died 1721)
  - Gaspar van Wittel, Dutch landscape painter (died 1736)

== Deaths ==
- March - Simon de Vlieger, Dutch painter (b. 1601)
- August 16 - Giuliano Finelli, Italian sculptor (b. 1601)
- August 24 - Henry Stone, English painter (b. 1616)
- August 29 - Gijsbert d'Hondecoeter, Dutch landscape and animal painter (b. 1604)
- October 16 - Jan Wildens, Flemish Baroque painter and draughtsman specializing in landscapes (b. 1595/1596)
- October 22 - Thomas de Critz, English painter (b. 1607)
- date unknown
  - Antoon Faydherbe, Dutch sculptor (date of birth unknown)
  - Aletta Hanemans, model for Frans Hals (b. 1606)
- probable
  - (d. 1653/1665) - Astolfo Petrazzi, Italian painter, active mainly in his native Siena (b. 1583)
  - (d. 1653/1656) - Nicolaes Pickenoy, Dutch painter of Flemish origin (b. 1588)
