= Portrait of Mariana of Austria =

1652–1653 painting by Diego Velázquez

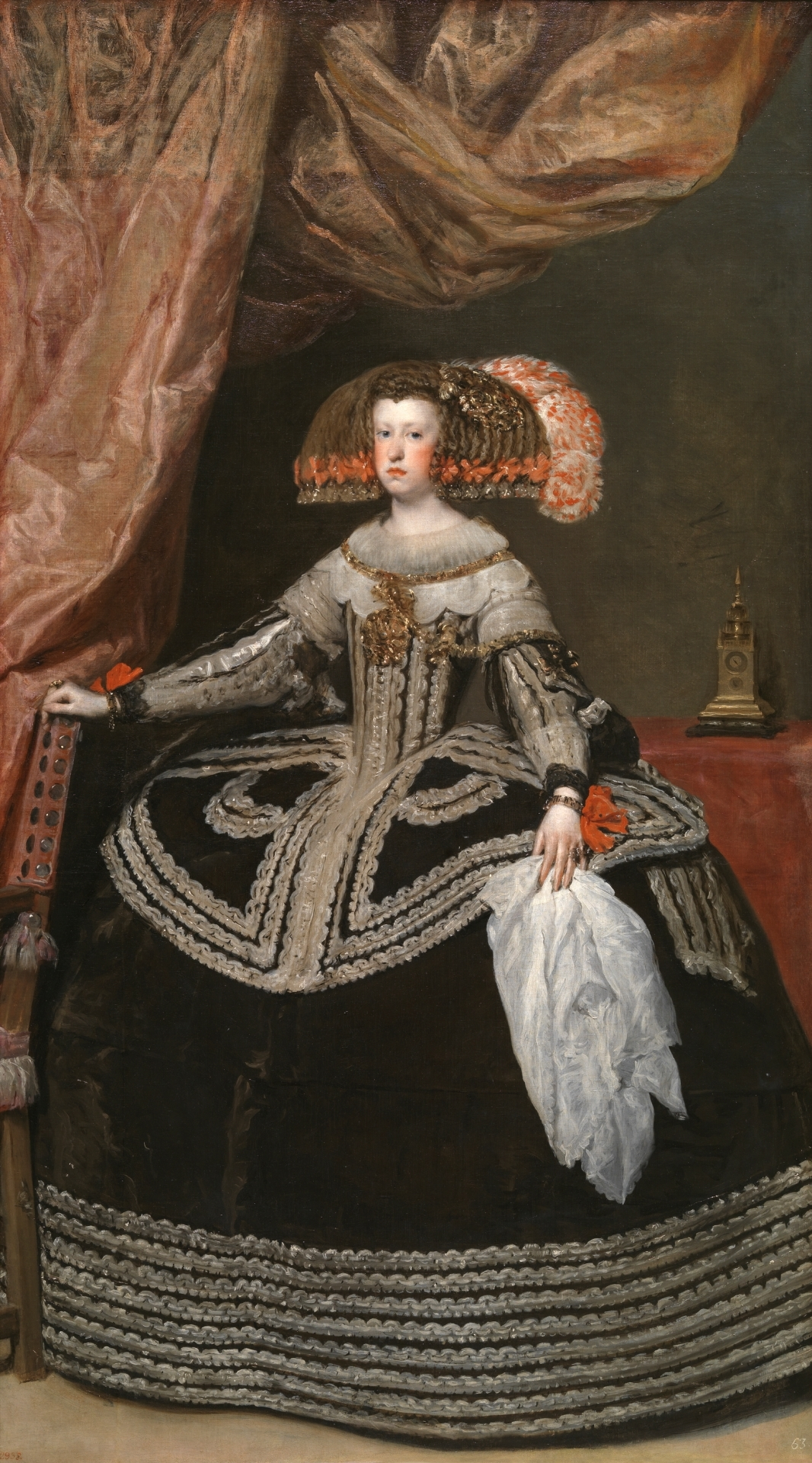
- Artist: Diego Velázquez
- Year: 1652–1653
- Medium: Oil on canvas
- Dimensions: 234.2 cm × 131.5 cm (92.2 in × 51.8 in)
- Location: Museo del Prado; Madrid

Portrait of Mariana of Austria is a 1652–1653 oil-on-canvas painting by Diego Velázquez, the leading artist of the Spanish Golden Age, existing in a number of versions. Its subject, Doña Mariana (known as Maria Anna), was the daughter of Emperor Ferdinand III and Maria Anna of Spain. She was nineteen years old when the painting was completed. Although described as vivacious and fun-loving in life, she is given an unhappy expression in Velázquez's portrait. The portrait is painted in shades of black and red, and her face is heavily made up. Her right hand rests on the back of a chair, and she holds a lace handkerchief in her left hand. Her bodice is decorated with jewellery, including a gold necklace, bracelets and a large gold brooch. A clock rests on scarlet drapery behind her, signifying her status and discernment.

Mariana had been betrothed to her first cousin, Prince Baltasar Carlos. He died in 1646 aged sixteen, and in 1649 she married her uncle, Baltasar Carlos's father, Philip IV, who sought her hand so as to preserve the hegemony of the Habsburg dynasty. (Note: The Habsburgs maintained their political advantage due to strategic marriages, especially between their Spanish and Austrian branches.) She became queen consort on their marriage, and after her husband's death in September 1665, regent during the minority of her son, Charles II, until he came of age in 1675. Owing to Charles' inhibiting physical weaknesses, she dominated the political life in Spain until her death in 1696.

Velázquez completed a series of portraits of the Spanish royal family in the 1650s. The paintings are marked by an emphasis on bright hues against dark backgrounds, extravagant head-dress, and fashionably wide dresses. The series culminates with the 1656 Las Meninas, which includes Mariana and, at center-stage, her daughter the Infanta Margarita Teresa. Three full-length versions of the Portrait of Mariana of Austria survive, as well as half-length variants. The version now in the Museo del Prado is known to be the original, having been in the Spanish royal collection since its completion. Its date is based on a matching description of a canvas sent to Ferdinand in Vienna on 15 December 1651. (Note: That work shows Mariana in a black and silver dress adorned with silver braid and red bows.)

== Background ==
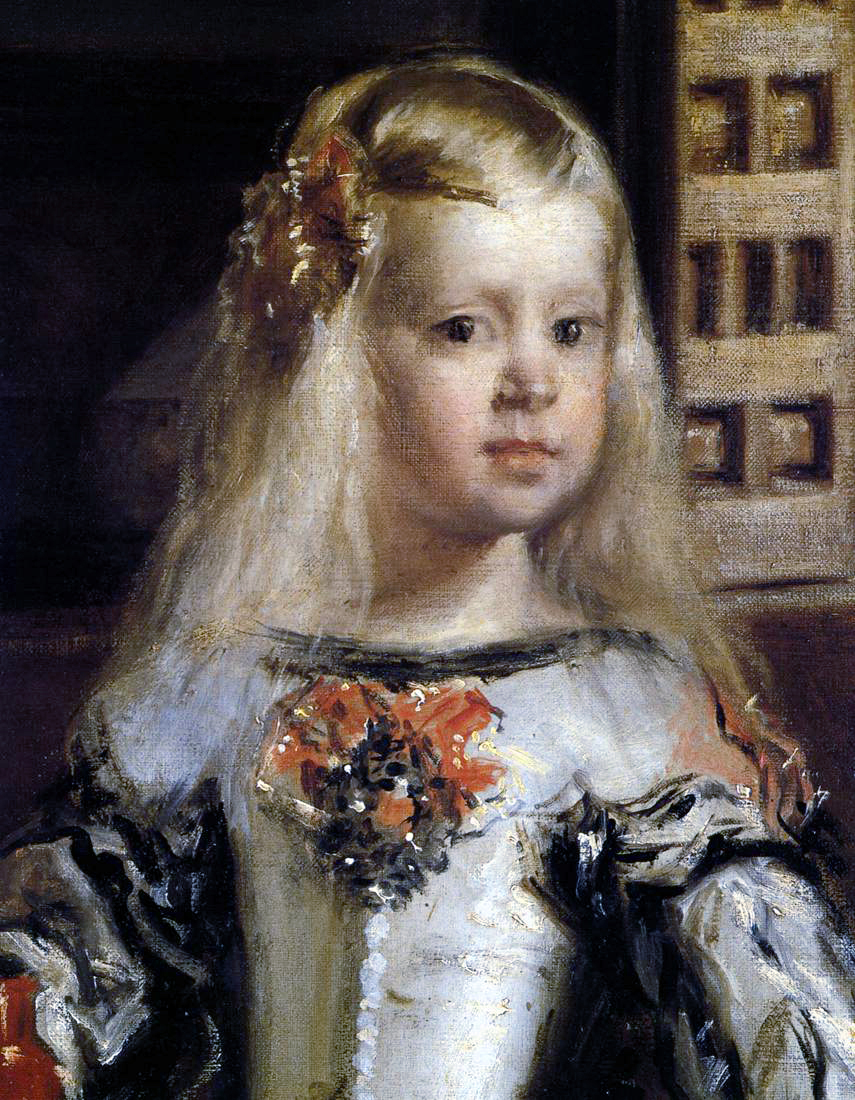
Velázquez, Detail from Las Meninas (1656) showing Mariana's daughter, the Infanta Margaret Theresa. Prado, Madrid.

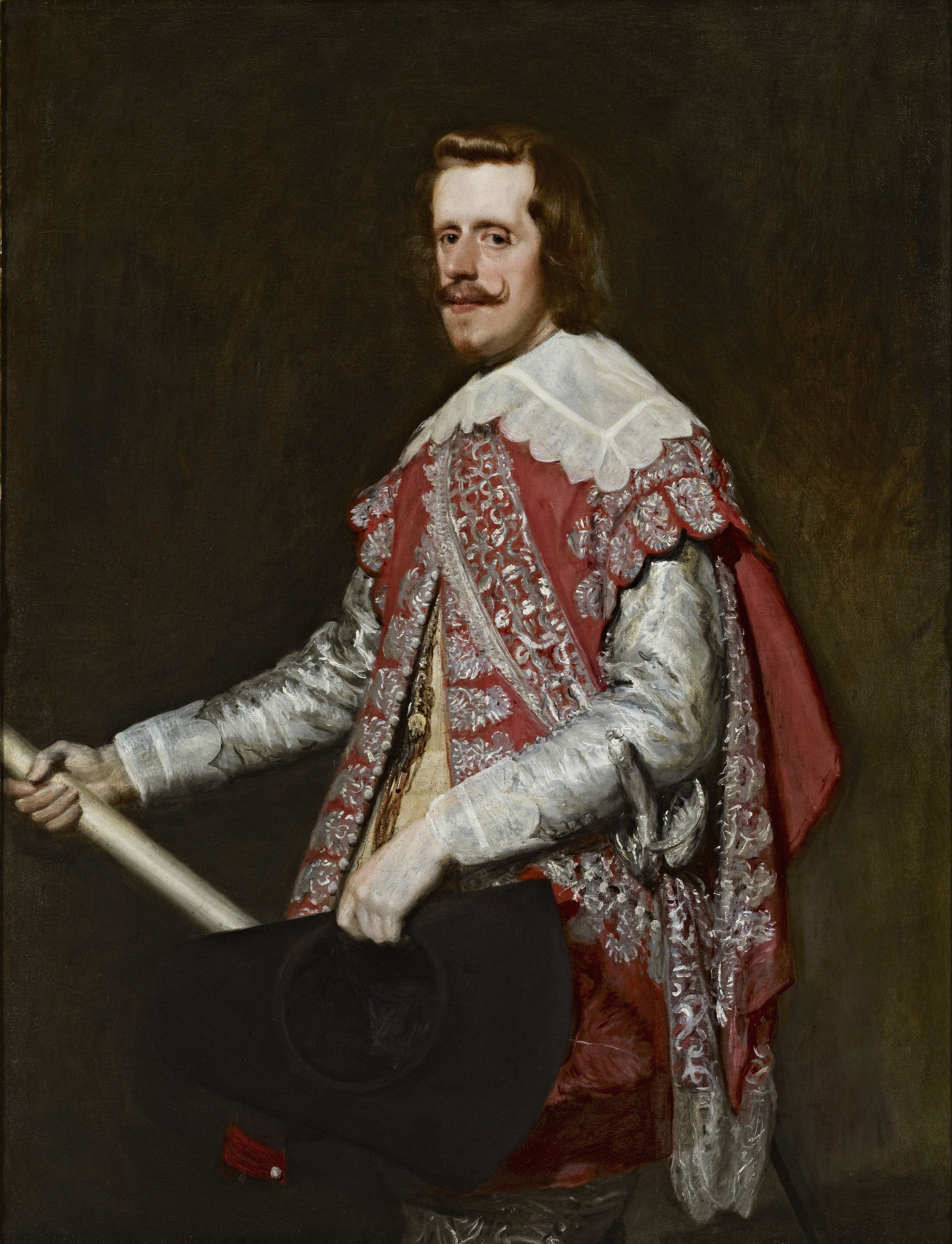
Velázquez, Portrait of Philip IV, 1644. Frick Collection, New York.

Mariana was born on 21 December 1634 in Wiener Neustadt, Austria, as the second child of Ferdinand III, Holy Roman Emperor, and Maria Anna of Spain, the sister of Philip IV of Spain. Maria had six children, of whom only Mariana and two sons survived into adulthood: Ferdinand (1633–1654), and Leopold (1640–1705), who became emperor in 1658. Philip's first wife, Elizabeth of France, died aged 41 in 1644. Their only son, Balthasar Charles, died of smallpox in October 1646, just a few months after his betrothal to Mariana, then 13. His death left the Spanish king heirless.

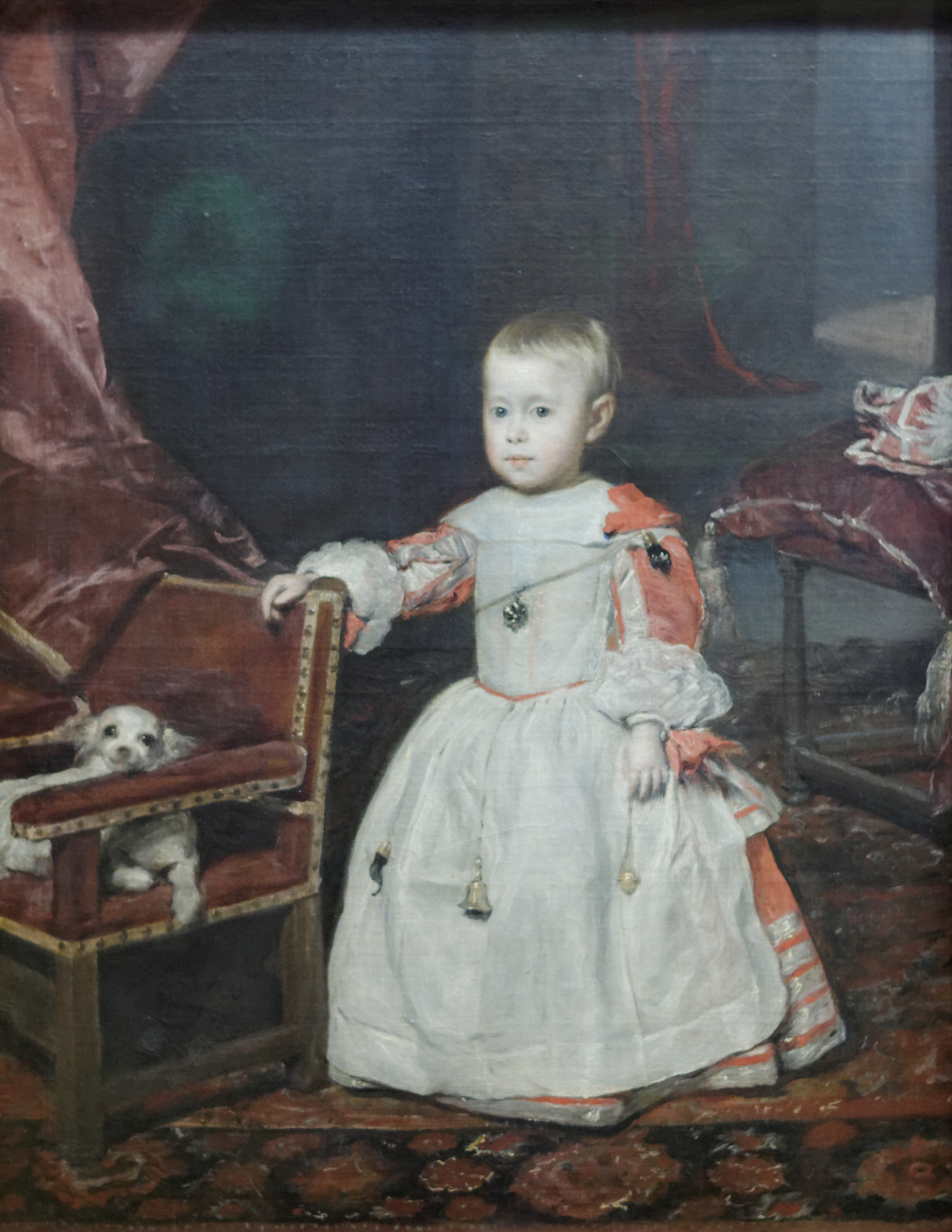
Portrait of Prince Philip Prospero, 1659. Kunsthistorisches Museum, Vienna.

Realising that the hegemony of the Habsburg dynasty was at stake, Philip proposed marriage to Mariana, his niece. Mariana was described by art historian Rose-Marie Hagen as a "ruddy-cheeked, naive girl who loved a good laugh", and her day-to-day courtly duties came to weigh heavily on her, not least the pressure to produce a male heir.

The marriage was initially viewed as a success by the royal court when Mariana gave birth to a daughter, the Infanta Margaret Theresa. They also had two sons: Felipe Próspero was the original heir to the throne, but died in 1661 aged 3 years; (Note: Felipe's 1659 portrait is described by Ortiz as "the most moving of Velázquez's portraits".) Charles, the future Charles II of Spain, was born later that year.

Mariana had a difficult life. She and Philip did not know each other before their marriage, and found little in common. The marriage presented many difficulties for the royal court. He was over 40, she was 19, and her bid to provide Philip with a male heir in a family whose sons tended to be sickly, included several false hopes and miscarriages. When Philip died in 1665 she became regent for Charles, the last of the Spanish Habsburgs. Charles was infirm throughout his life, suffering from mental and physical disabilities, and the Spanish monarchy allowed women to play a powerful role in government, so Mariana was able to dominate the political life of Spain until her own death in 1696.

== Description ==
X-ray scan

Velázquez sought to reinvigorate 16th-century court portraiture, which was then, according to art historian Javier Portús, "petrified into a rigid format ... with its clichés of gesture and deportment". As an official court portrait, the painting adheres to convention, with every attempt made to convey a sense of Mariana's majesty. Her extravagant taste in clothes and jewellery is evident, but a modern view is that she was a rather plain looking woman in an unhappy marriage, perhaps lacking in much of the elegance that Velázquez attributed to her.

The painting is composed of harmonious shades of whites, blacks and reds. The scarlet velvet curtain lends the painting a theatrical air. Its material and colour are similar to the long table behind her, on top of which is placed a gilt clock in the shape of a tower. The chair and table signify her royal status, while the clock draws attention to her duties as Queen consort and suggests the virtue of prudence.

Velázquez seemingly conducts an in-depth examination of Mariana's character. She is depicted as elegant and extravagantly dressed in the height of contemporary fashion, but with a sulky expression. According to Hagen, Mariana felt constricted by the demands of court, and suffered from "boredom, loneliness, home-sickness and illness in consequence of her never ending pregnancies [which] transformed the lively girl into that willful, mulish German". Her pout reappears in several of Velázquez's later portraits, including Juan Bautista Martínez del Mazo's 1666 Mariana of Spain in Mourning, painted just after her husband died and the year her daughter Margarita, then twelve, was sent to marry her uncle, Emperor Leopold I.

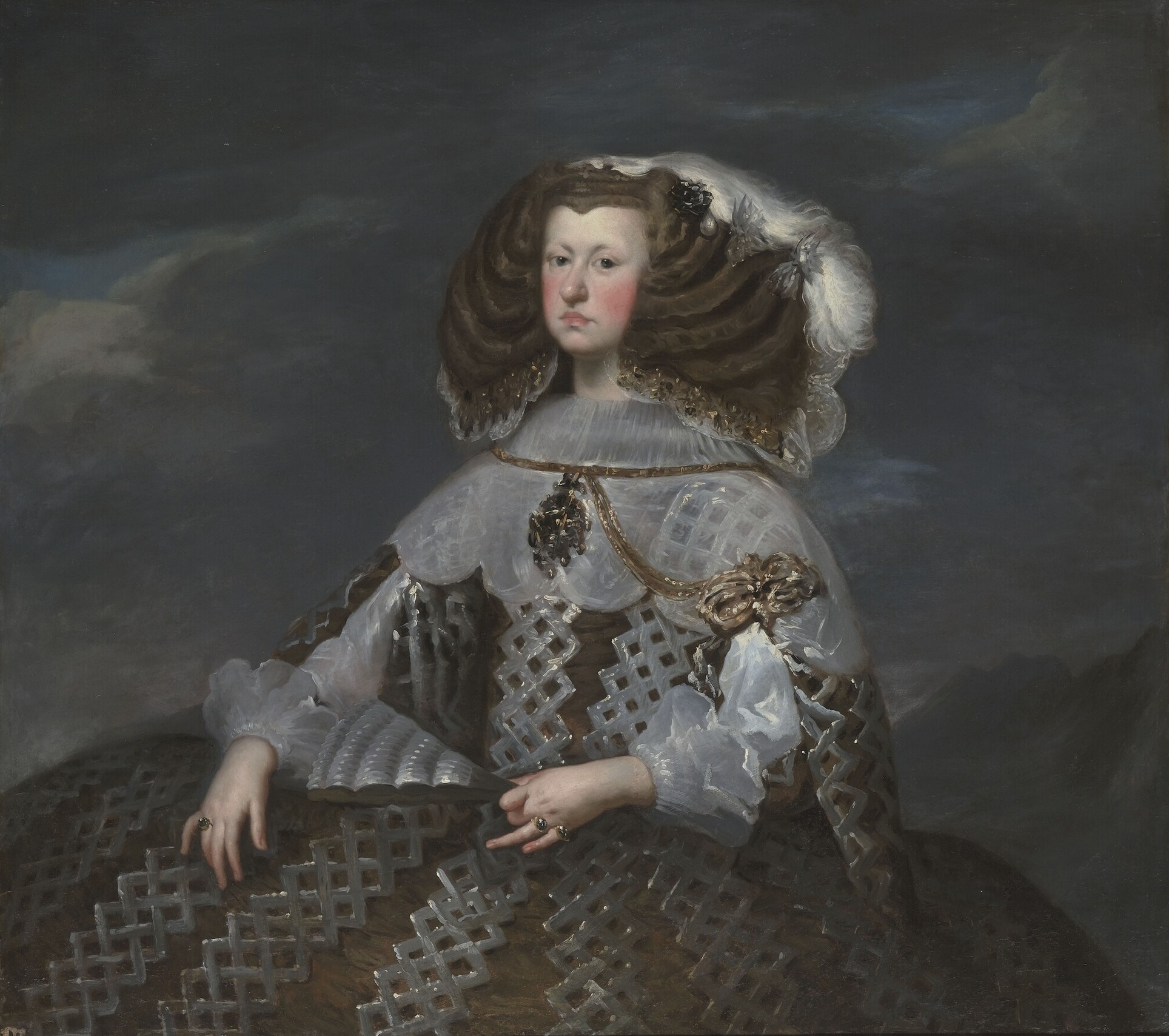
Portrait of Mariana, 1660. Palace of Versailles.

The subject has an unusually rigid and stiff pose; her upper body and head seem to almost suffocate underneath her black dress. The dress is supported by a wide and stiff farthingale; its width emphasised by the broad lace collar and the horizontal patterns of its trimmed borders. Her unusually pale skin is heavily painted in rouge, making it almost doll-like under her wig and wide head-dress. Her face is painted with thick brush strokes and layers of opaque paint that thin towards the edges, where they appear, from radiography, to have been applied in quick dabs. Although only 19 years old at the time, she stands in the "formal and upright, Catholic manner" expected of contemporary Spanish royalty.

Mariana holds a lace handkerchief in her left hand. Her farthingale and bodice reflect her interest in high fashion. Her dress is extensively lined with silver braids and decorated with red ribbon. Her many pieces of jewellery include bracelets, gold chains and an elaborate gold brooch pinned on her chest. Her brown hair is adorned with red ribbons and a series of braids that extend widely on either side. She wears a large red and white plume which pictorially acts to frame her face. Her left hand holds a large and elaborately folded white cloth, whose depiction, in its attention to line and abandonment of scale, has been described by art historian Antonio Domínguez Ortiz as "worthy of El Greco".

== Commission and dating ==
Velázquez was then the Spanish crown painter, having been Aposentador mayor del Palacio (officer in charge of palace lodging) since 1652. He operated in a pressurised court under threat from the anti-Catholic Oliver Cromwell, the Catalan revolt, and the withdrawal of Austrian support. He admitted to being drained by his workload, and that his official duties limited the time he could devote to painting; he produced fewer than twenty works during the last eight and a half years of his life. Of these some fourteen survive, mostly of the royal family. The run of portraits began with Philip and Mariana's marriage in 1649, and include canvases of Maria Theresa of Spain and Felipe Prospero, their first two children to live beyond infancy. Felipe died aged 3 years, but portraits of Maria Theresa became in demand among potential suitors when she reached marriageable age.

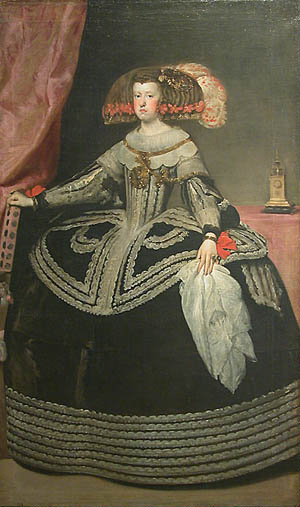
The Louvre copy does not contain the overhanging portion of the curtain.

When Ferdinand III requested a portrait of his daughter, Philip asked Velázquez to return to Madrid from his 1649–1650 visit to Italy as soon as possible. The Prado dates the painting between 1652 and 1653, and the art historian José López-Rey agrees. Josep Gudiol places it at 1652, noting that replicas were completed and distributed during 1652–1653. The replica now in the Musée du Louvre was sent to Ferdinand on 15 December 1652. From this, the painting can be assumed as finished before this date.

Velázquez again painted Mariana after Philip's death in 1665. Imbued with a sense of pathos, his late portraits emphasise the effects of widowhood. Although these portraits are dour and mournful in tone, in person Mariana was engaging and fun loving. The 1653 Portrait of the Infanta Maria Theresa of Spain shows the sitter in a very similar pose, complete with large wig, wide dress, and similar overhanging velvet curtain.

== Provenance and copies ==
The painting was recorded in a 1700 inventory when it was paired with Philip IV in Armour with a Lion, which is now in El Escorial, Madrid, and attributed to members of his workshop. Velázquez's portrait of Philip is unfinished; some sections, including the lion, are described by art historian Julián Gállego as "hardly more than sketched". According to the art historian Georgia Mancini, sometime before 1700, another hand "added a piece of canvas to the top of the original composition and painted the upper part of the curtain", so as it would match the size of Philip's portrait.

Later in life, Velázquez became preoccupied with courtly duties, and tended to paint a bust-length portrait of his sitter from life, leaving the completion of the final work to assistants. Several contemporary full-length copies are known; one in the Kunsthistorisches Museum, Vienna, a second was sent to Archduke Leopold William in 1653, but is now lost. The third was in the Prado until it was acquired by the Louvre in a 1941 exchange. A half-length version attributed to members of his workshop is in the Metropolitan Museum of Art. The version cataloged in the collection of Richard Ford by the German art historian Gustav Friedrich Waagen in his 1854 "Art Treasures in Great Britain", and misidentified by Harry Wehle in 1940 as the Met picture, is today attributed to followers of Velázquez, and in the Ringling Museum of Art, Sarasota, Florida.

The Painting (Le Tableau), a 2024 short film by Michèle Lemieux, recreated the painting using pinscreen animation to illustrate Mariana's life.

== Gallery ==
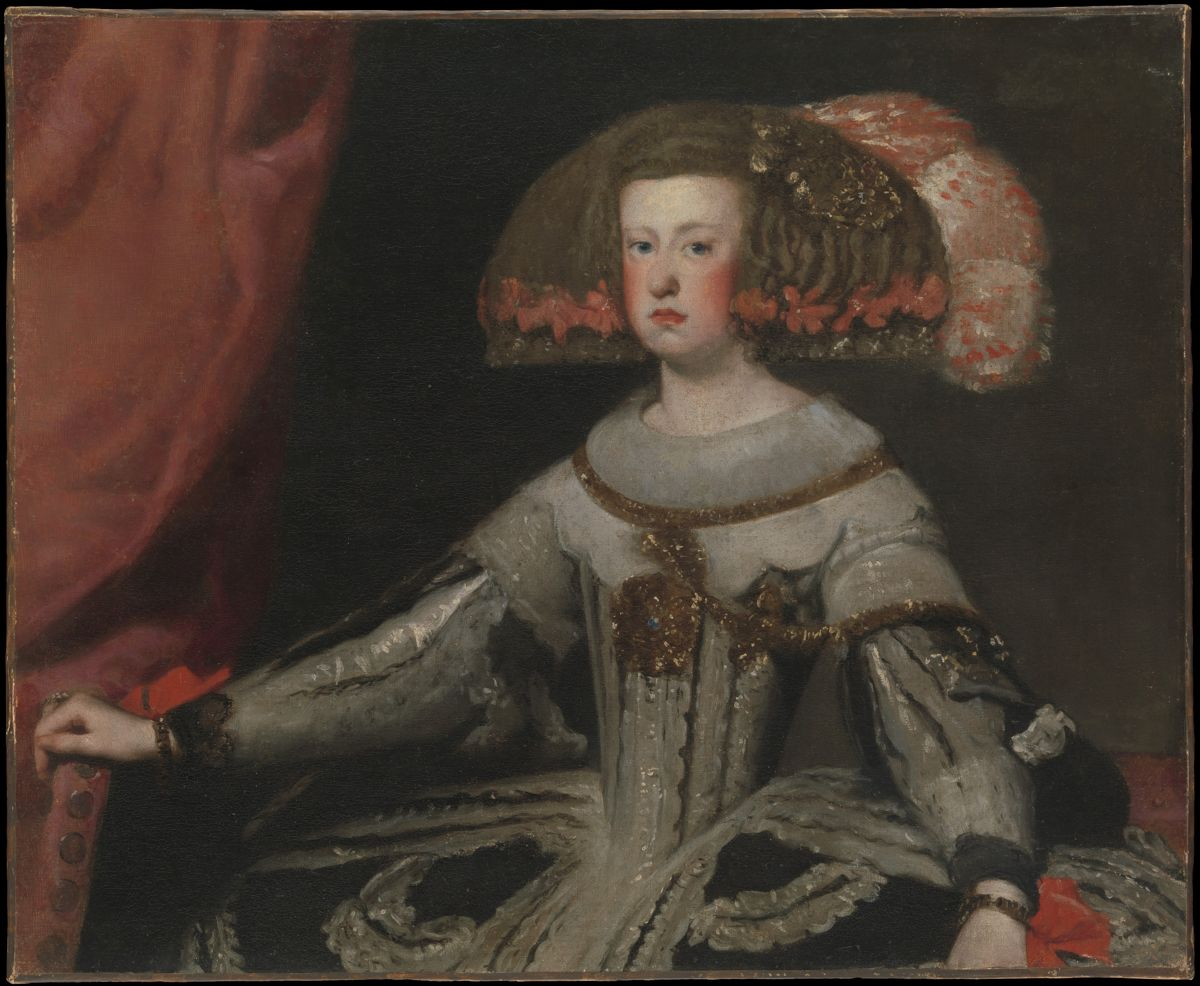
Half-length workshop copy, Metropolitan Museum of Art, New York

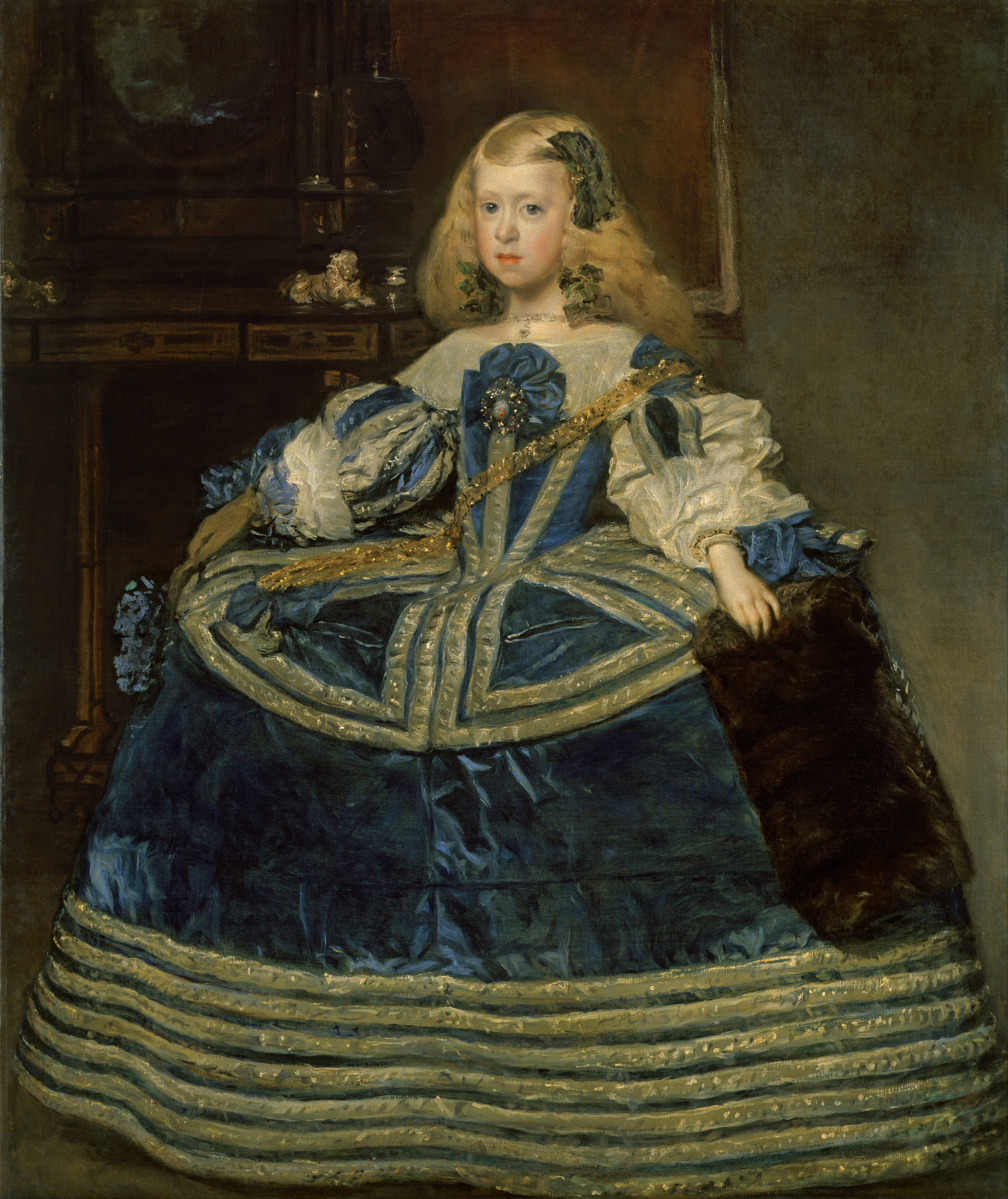
Infanta Margarita Teresa in a Blue Dress, 1659. Kunsthistorisches Museum, Vienna. A later variant of Mariana's portrait.

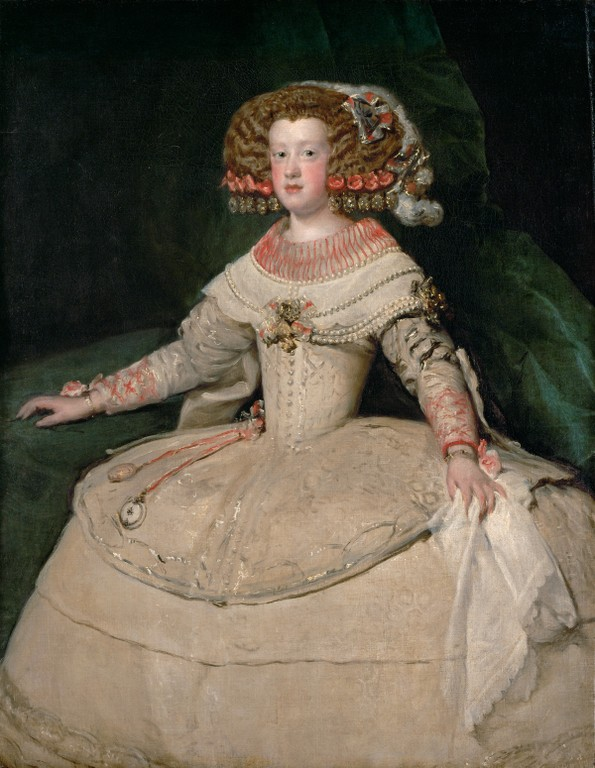
Portrait of the Infanta Maria Theresa of Spain, 1653. Kunsthistorisches Museum, Vienna. Note the very similar hair, pose, dress and handkerchief.

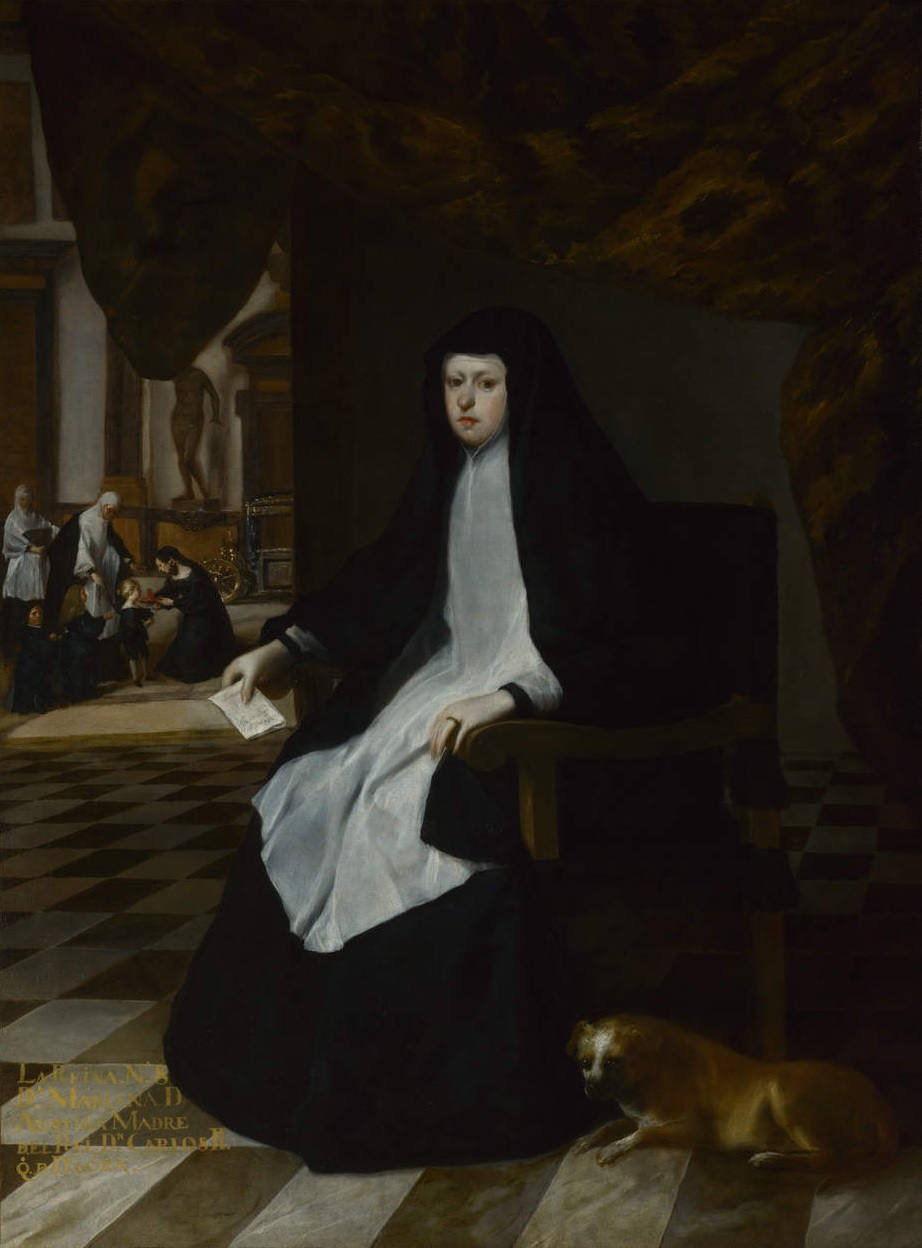
Juan Bautista Martínez del Mazo, Mariana of Spain in Mourning, 1666, National Gallery, London
