= The Martyrdom of Saint Catherine =

The Martyrdom of Saint Catherine may refer to one of a number of paintings:

- The Martyrdom of Saint Catherine (Guercino)
- The Martyrdom of Saint Catherine (Reni)
