= Infanta Margarita Teresa in a Blue Dress =

Painting by Diego Velázquez

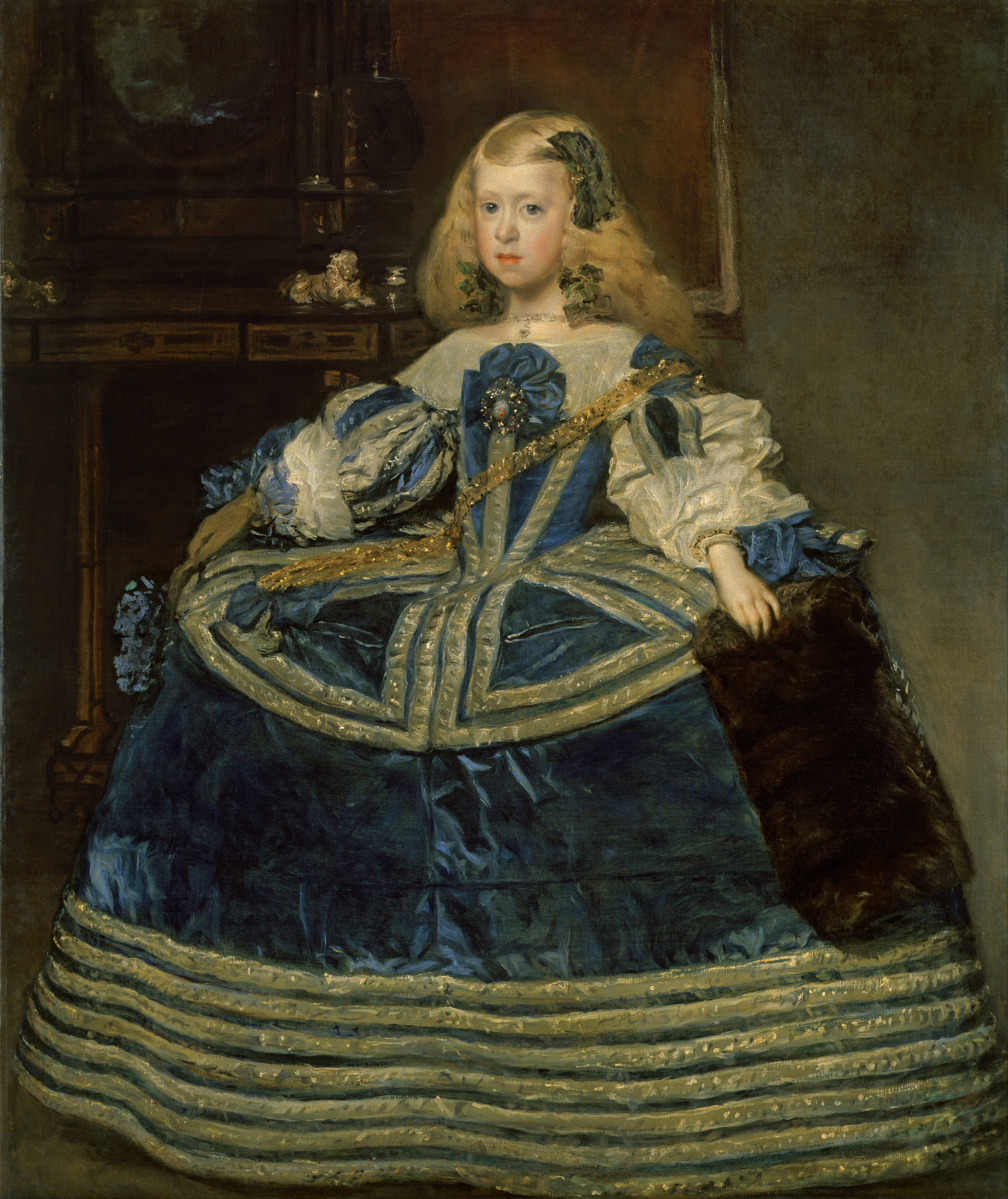
- Artist: Diego Velázquez
- Year: 1659
- Medium: Oil on canvas
- Dimensions: 127 cm × 107 cm (50 in × 42 in)
- Location: Kunsthistorisches Museum; Vienna

Infanta Margarita Teresa in a Blue Dress is one of the best-known portraits by Spanish painter Diego Velázquez. Executed in oil on canvas, it measures 127 cm high by 107 cm wide and was one of Velázquez's last paintings, produced in 1659, a year before his death. It shows Margaret Theresa of Spain who also appears in the artist's Las Meninas. Currently, the painting is in the Kunsthistorisches Museum.

This is one of the several court portraits made by Velázquez on different occasions of Infanta Margaret Theresa who, at fifteen, married her uncle, Leopold I, Holy Roman Emperor. She is the little infanta who appears in Las Meninas (1656). These paintings show her in different stages of her childhood; they were sent to Vienna to inform Leopold of what his young fiancée looked like.

The Kunsthistorisches Museum in Vienna has two other paintings by Velázquez: Infanta Maria Teresa and Portrait of Prince Philip Prospero. However, this portrait of Infanta Margarita is possibly the best of the three.

In this portrait, Velázquez used the technique of loose brushstrokes that fuse into coherence only when viewed from a certain distance. The infanta, here eight years old, is shown with a solemn expression. She wears a blue silk dress which is adorned with silver borders after the Spanish fashion of the era; the most striking characteristic is the huge expanse of the voluminous crinoline which is accentuated by the trimmed borders and the wide lace collar. In one of her hands she holds a brown fur muff, perhaps a present from Vienna. The young girl, who is presented as pretty and appealing, has a pale countenance which is enhanced by the blue and silver tones. In the background, there is a high console table with a round mirror behind it.

== See also ==
- List of works by Diego Velázquez
