= Magdalena Moncada =

Spanish Courtier

Magdalena Moncada (died 1670), was a Spanish courtier.

She was the lady-in-waiting of the queen of Spain, Mariana of Austria from 1648. She became an influential favorite and confidant of the queen, and used it to benefit the careers of protegees.
