= The Martyrdom of Saint Catherine (Reni) =

Painting by Guido Reni

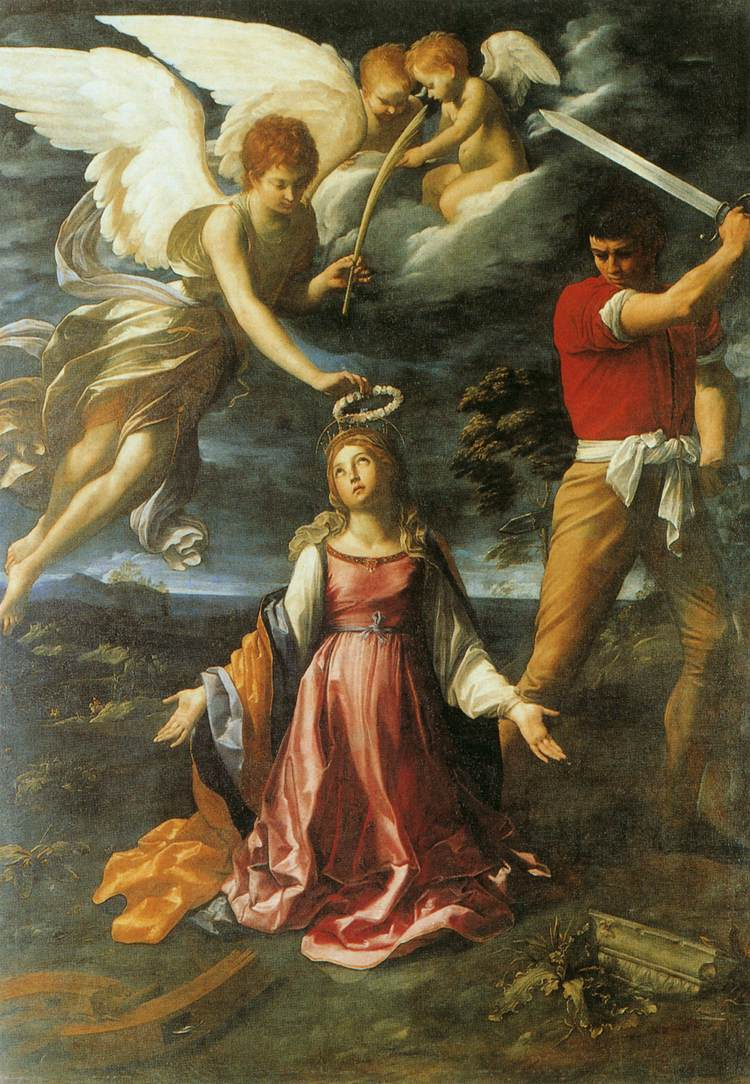
The Martyrdom of Saint Catherine (c. 1606) by Guido Reni

The Martyrdom of Saint Catherine is a c. 1606 oil on canvas painting by Guido Reni, considered one of his most important early works and now held in the Diocesan Museum in Albenga.

== Description and style ==
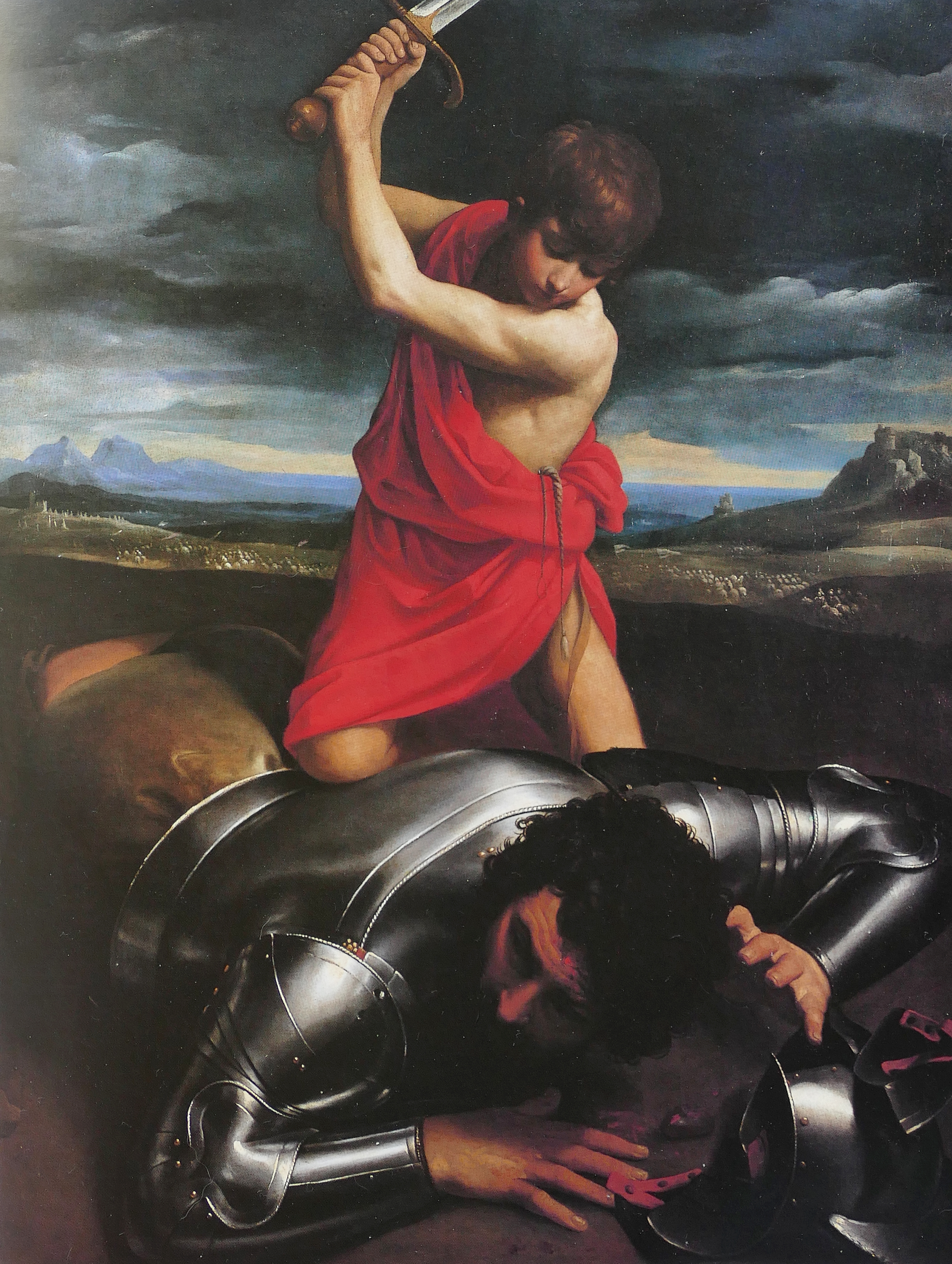
David and Goliath, c.1607, one of Reni's works most influenced by Caravaggio.
