= Philip Prospero, Prince of Asturias =

Prince of Asturias (1657–1661)

Philip Prospero
- Prince of Asturias
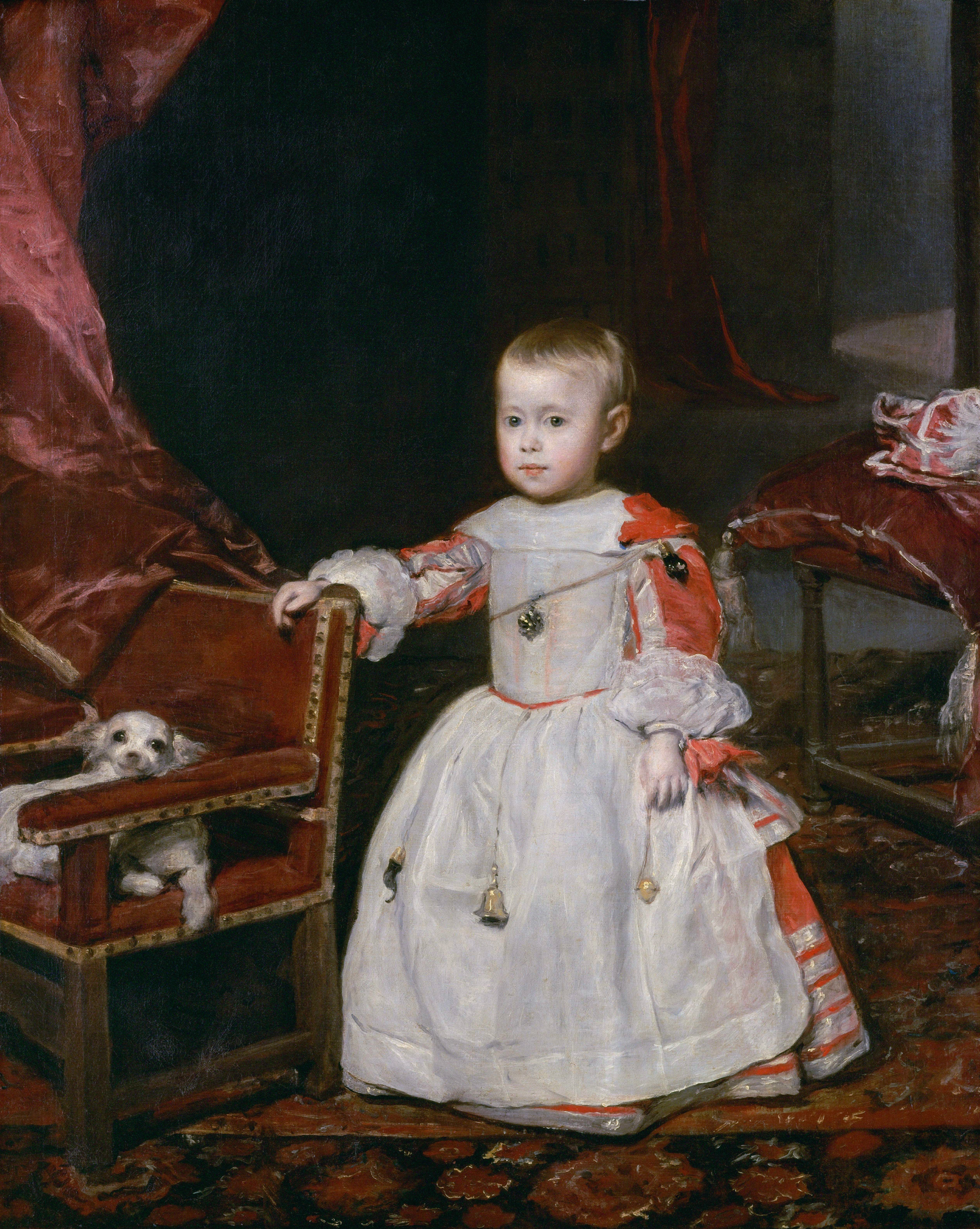
- 1659 portrait by Diego Velázquez
- Born: 28 November 1657; Royal Alcázar, Madrid, Spain
- Died: 1 November 1661 (aged 3); Royal Alcázar, Madrid, Spain
- Burial: El Escorial
Names
- Felipe Próspero José Francisco Domingo Ignacio Antonio Buenaventura Diego Miguel Luis Alfonso Isidro Ramón Víctor de Austria y Austria
- House: Habsburgs of Spain
- Father: Philip IV of Spain
- Mother: Mariana of Austria

Philip Prospero, Prince of Asturias (Felipe Próspero José Francisco Domingo Ignacio Antonio Buenaventura Diego Miguel Luis Alfonso Isidro Ramón Víctor; 28 November 1657 – 1 November 1661) was the first son of Philip IV of Spain and Mariana of Austria to survive infancy. Philip IV had no male heir since the death of Balthasar Charles, his son by his first wife, Elisabeth of France, eleven years before, and as Spain's strength continued to ebb the issue of succession had become a matter of fervent and anxious prayer.

== Birth ==
After Balthasar Charles's early demise, Philip was left with his daughter Maria Theresa as heir presumptive. In early 1657, astrologers assured Philip that another child was to be born to him and it would be a boy who would live. A strict and devout Roman Catholic, Philip ate nothing but eggs on the first day of the Vigil of the Presentation of the Virgin, in hopes of his wife delivering a male child. Indeed, at 11:30 in the morning on 28 November that year, Mariana of Austria delivered a son. She soon fell sick of the birthing fever, but nobody seemed to mind; they were all rejoicing at the birth of a male heir. Barrionuevo, a chronicler of the time, wrote of this rejoicing:

On the day of the birth, not a bench nor a table was left unbroken in the palace, nor a single pastry-cook's nor tavern that was not sacked. Tomorrow [6 December] they say that his Majesty will go on horseback to the Atocha to give thanks to the Mother of God... They say the prince is a pretty little chap, and that the King wishes him to be baptized at once, before the extreme cold comes on... There are to be masquerades, bull-fights and cane-tourneys as soon as the Queen stands up to see them, as well as plays with machinery invented by an engineer, a servant of the Nuncio, to be represented at the theatre of Retiro, and the saloon of the palace... The municipality, following the lead of the Councils, have gone to congratulate the King... and no gentleman, great or small, has failed to do the like.

To honor the birth of the new male heir, Diego Fernández de Medrano y Zenizeros, Lord of Valdeosera and Sojuela, dedicated his political treatise, Mirror of Princes: Crucible of their Virtues, Astonishment of their Failings, Soul of their Government and Government of their Soul:

To the Most Serene Prince of the Spains, Don Philip Prospero... revered as foremost in the defense of the Catholic Church, always known as August through the Generous and Valiant Imperial Blood of the House of Austria, incorporated into the Spanish August Monarchy. And for all these combined causes, and others promised by his fortunate years, he is esteemed as the 'Perfect Prince,' Philip Prospero.

== Baptism ==
Following Roman Catholic custom, the infant was called only "the prince" until his baptism. Astrologers predicted nothing but greatness for his future, while Philip was still unsure that he had not thanked God enough for this immense joy. In a letter to his friend Sor María de Ágreda, he wrote that "the newborn babe is doing well", but also made a reference to the bitter memory of his eldest son's demise. On 6 December 1657 Philip rode into the decorated streets of Madrid, where the preparations for the prince's baptism were almost ready: dances, masques and music greeted the King.

The baptism took place exactly one week later on December 13, performed by the Archbishop of Toledo. The Holy Water was brought from the Jordan River by some friars who had recently returned from Jordan. The same Barrionuevo wrote that "the Prince screamed lustily when he was baptized, and, attracted by the loud, resonant voice, the King, who was looking through the jalousies, exclaimed, 'Ah! that does sound well; the house smells of a man now'". The christening cost Philip 600,000 ducats.

== Heir apparent to the throne ==
Philip Prospero's birth was greeted with much joy not only because of the child's gender, but also because it put an end to various dynastic quarrels that would come to be after his daughters' marriages (as Philip IV had no living sons at the time, his daughters' husbands would most likely fight over which one would succeed to the Spanish throne after the elder Philip's death). Thus in 1658, Philip Prospero was sworn in as heir of his father and Prince of Asturias. Nevertheless, he did not enjoy good health and constantly had to carry an amulet with him, which is present in Diego Velázquez's painting of him.

By 1659 the prime ministers of France and Spain had been negotiating an end to their countries' hostilities. Now that Spain had a male heir she could agree to consolidate the peace by marrying the king's eldest child Maria Theresa to the French king Louis XIV. The outcome of the negotiations was the Treaty of the Pyrenees, which established France as Europe's new dominant power.

== Portrait ==
The first known portrait of Philip Prospero was painted by Velazquez in 1659, the year Philip felt he could safely agree to the terms of the treaty with France. This portrait and one of Margarita Teresa were made that year for the Emperor Leopold I, their mother's brother and Margarita's future husband. In the painting the prince appears to be around three years old. He stands before a rich black background, the blackness of which is reflected in his eyes. His wrist limply rests over the back of a child-size chair in which lies a contented spaniel. (These are a traditional pose and prop, though Velazquez painted the child’s sister and, years before, his half-brother Balthasar Charles with their hands in a more commanding position, placed flat and firm, not dangling.)

In Velazquez's depiction, the baby's eyes have a faint hollowness around them. His pale face and hands, as well as his white muslin smock, are accented by the red of his gown and create contrast against the more subdued background colors. But the painting directly admits the little boy's precarious health: from strings criss-crossing his chest and waist hang metal bells and at least two protective lucky amulets, a cornicello, and on the string across his left shoulder hangs a black object, likely a fig-hand carved of jet. By contrast, nearly thirty years earlier, Velazquez painted a robust Balthasar Charles at age two or three with a staff, sword, exuberant sash and plumed hat. This is not a political picture, but it does show that the hopes of a nation are dependent on the youth, which itself is depending on luck and fate.

== Death ==
Philip Prospero had been ill for quite some time before his November 1661 death. He suffered from epilepsy and became ill frequently, probably due to having a very defective immune system from generations of inbreeding. The King even brought the relics of Saint Diego of Alcalá to the palace in hopes of curing his heir. On 1 November 1661 he died, following a severe epileptic seizure at The Royal Alcázar of Madrid . Five days later, Philip's youngest son and final child, Infante Charles was born. He would ascend the throne in 1665, following Philip's death. Philip held himself indirectly responsible for his son's death, which is clear in a letter that he wrote to Sor María about Philip Prospero's death:

The long illness of my son and my constant attendance at his bedside have prevented me from answering your letter, nor has my grief allowed me to do so, until today. I confess to you, Sor María, that my grief is great, as is natural after losing such a jewel as this. But in the midst of my sorrow, I have tried to offer it to God, and to submit to His divine will; believing most earnestly that He will order all things for the best, which is the most important thing. I can assure you that what grieves me even more than my loss is that I see clearly that I have angered God, and that these punishments are sent in retribution for my sins.

== Ancestry ==
Ancestors of Philip Prospero, Prince of Asturias

8. Philip II of Spain
4. Philip III of Spain
9. Anna of Austria
2. Philip IV of Spain
10. Charles II, Archduke of Austria
5. Margaret of Austria
11. Maria Anna of Bavaria
1. Philip Prospero, Prince of Asturias
12. Ferdinand II, Holy Roman Emperor
6. Ferdinand III, Holy Roman Emperor
13. Maria Anna of Bavaria
3. Mariana of Austria
14. Philip III of Spain (= 4)
7. Maria Anna of Austria
15. Margaret of Austria (= 5)

== Bibliography ==
- Brown, Jonathan; Enggass, Robert (1970). Italian and Spanish Art, 1600-1750: Sources and Documents (2nd, reprinted ed.). Evanston: Northwestern University Press. ISBN 978-0-8101-1065-6. Archived from the original on 2014-03-08.
- Haliczer, Stephen (2002). Between Exaltation and Infamy: Female Mystics in the Golden Age of Spain (1st ed.). Oxford: Oxford University Press. ISBN 978-0-19-514863-3.
- Hume, Martin (1907). The court of Philip IV: Spain in decadence (1st ed.). London: Eveleigh Nash. OL 24188444M.
- Stradling, R. A. (2002). Philip IV and the Government of Spain, 1621–1665 (1st ed.). Cambridge: Cambridge University Press. ISBN 978-0-52-153055-2.

Philip Prospero, Prince of Asturias House of Habsburg Born: 28 November 1657 Died: 1 November 1661
Spanish royalty
Vacant Title last held by Balthasar Charles	Prince of Asturias; 1657–1661	Vacant Title next held by Charles
