= Mariana of Austria =

Queen of Spain from 1649 to 1665

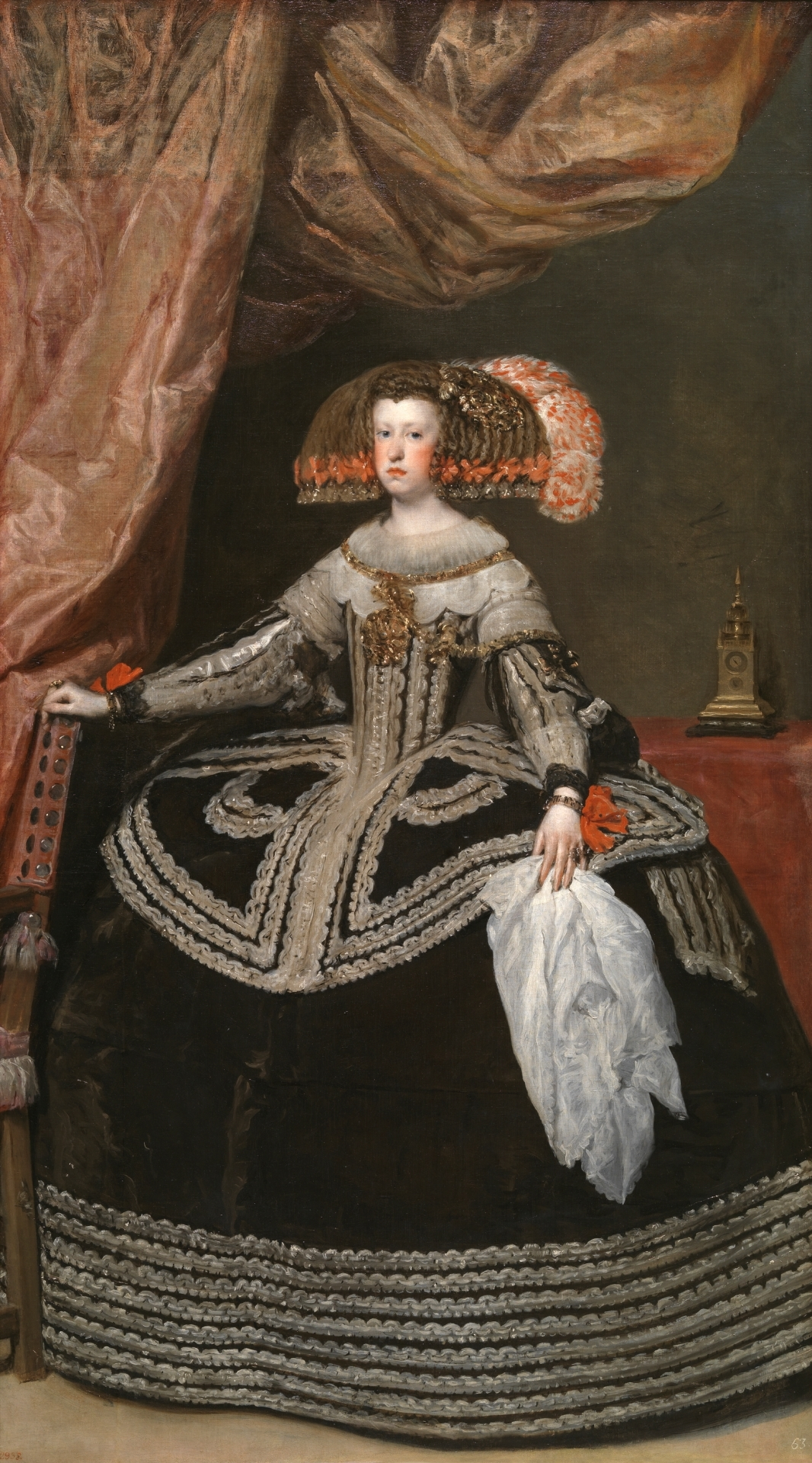
- Portrait of Mariana of Austria by Diego Velázquez, 1652–53

Queen consort of Spain
- Tenure: 7 October 1649 – 17 September 1665

Queen regent of Spain
- Regency: 17 September 1665 – 6 November 1675
- Monarch: Charles II
- Born: 24 December 1634; Wiener Neustadt, Archduchy of Austria, Holy Roman Empire
- Died: 16 May 1696 (aged 61); Palace of the Councils, Madrid, Crown of Castile
- Burial: El Escorial
- Spouse: Philip IV of Spain (m. 1649; died 1665)
- Issue Among others: Margaret Theresa, Holy Roman Empress; Philip Prospero, Prince of Asturias; Charles II, King of Spain
- House: Habsburg
- Father: Ferdinand III, Holy Roman Emperor
- Mother: Maria Anna of Spain
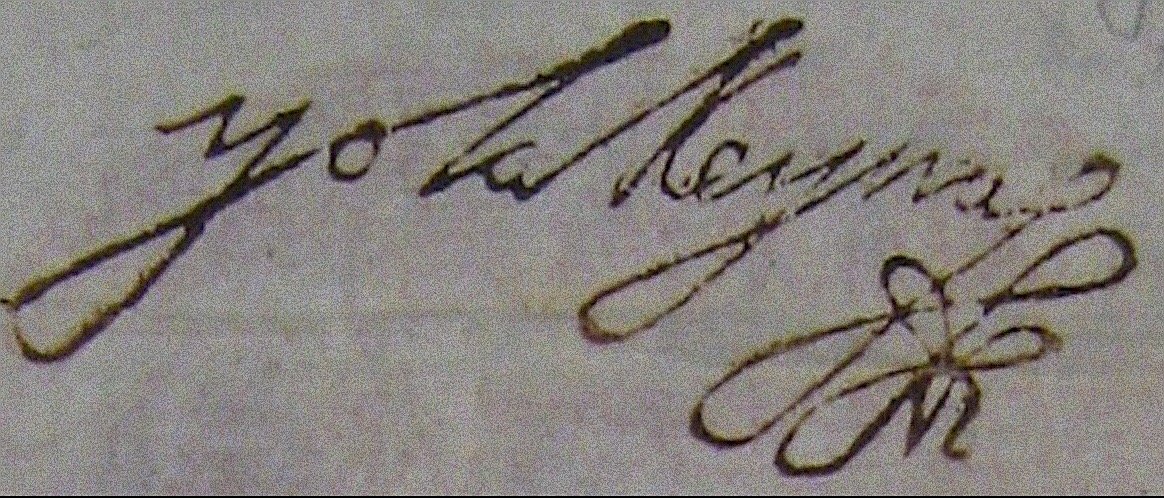
- Signature

Mariana of Austria (Note: Spanish: Mariana de Austria German: Maria Anna von Österreich) (24 December 1634 – 16 May 1696) was Queen of Spain from 1649 until her husband Philip IV of Spain died in 1665. Appointed Regent for their infant son Charles II, she remained an influential figure until her own death in 1696.

Her regency was overshadowed by the decline of Spain in the second half of the 17th century, and internal political divisions, combined with a general European economic crisis. Charles died without children in 1700, leading to the 1701 to 1714 War of the Spanish Succession.

The Mariana Islands in the Pacific Ocean are named after her following the Spanish colonization in the 17th century; so is the Mariana Trench, the deepest point on Earth.

== Birth and early years ==
Mariana was born on 24 December 1634 in Wiener Neustadt, second child of Maria Anna of Spain and her husband Ferdinand (1608–1657), who became Holy Roman Emperor in 1637. Her parents had three children who survived into adulthood, Mariana, and her two brothers, Ferdinand (1633–1654) and Leopold (1640–1705), elected emperor in 1658.

In 1646, Mariana was betrothed to her cousin Balthasar Charles, Prince of Asturias, heir to the Spanish throne. His death soon afterwards left her without a prospective husband and her widowed uncle Philip IV without a successor. The solution was a marriage between Philip and his niece on 7 October 1649 at Navalcarnero, outside Madrid.

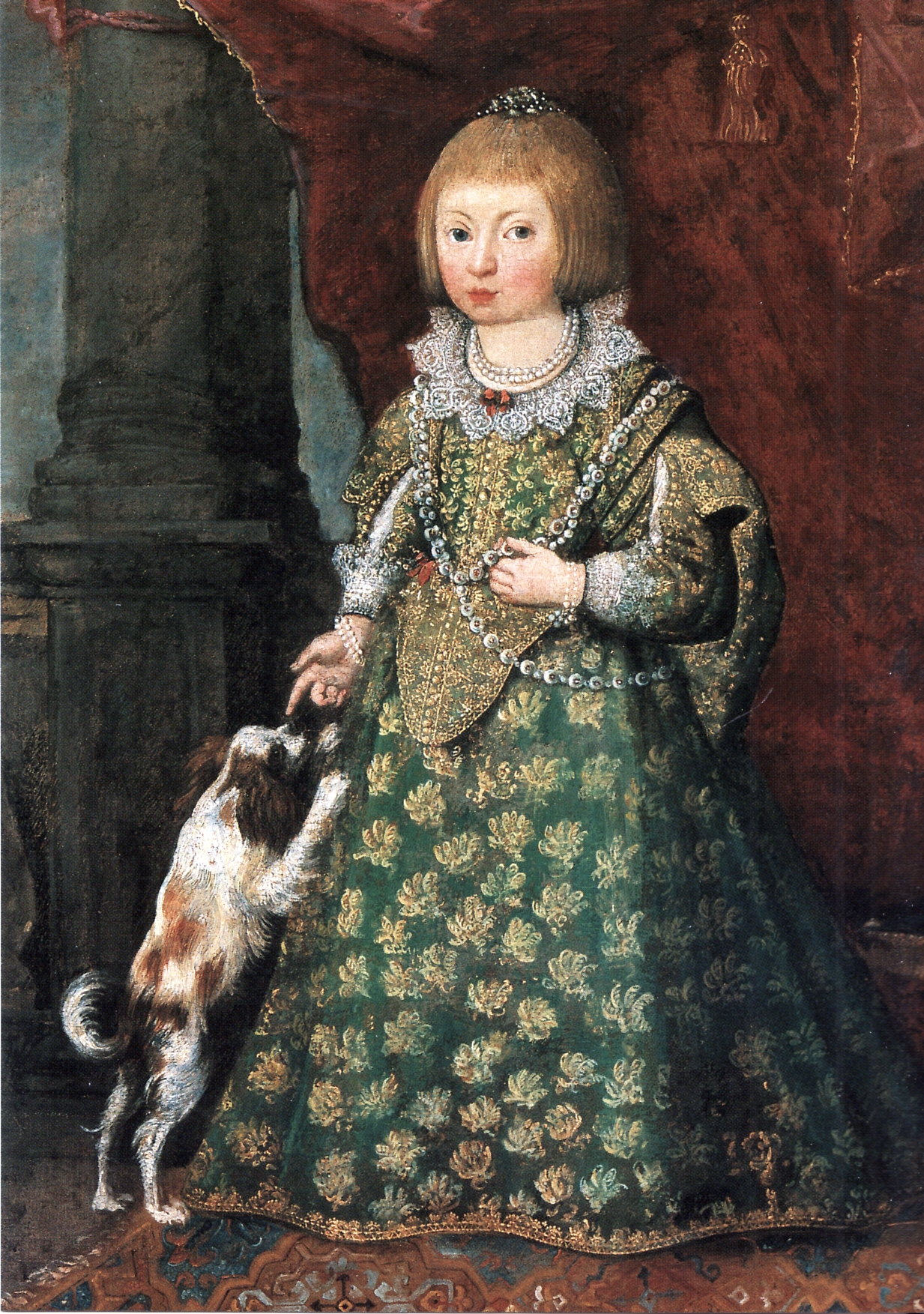
Mariana in Spanish costume, c. 1630s

Only two of their five children survived to adulthood. The eldest, Margaret Theresa, married her maternal uncle Leopold I, Holy Roman Emperor in 1666. Mariana's second daughter, Maria Ambrosia, lived only fifteen days, followed by two sons, Philip Prospero and Ferdinand Thomas. On 6 November 1661, Mariana gave birth to her last child, a son, Charles. Subject to ill health for much of his life, one study argues this may have been caused by genetic disorders inherited from his parents.

== Regency ==
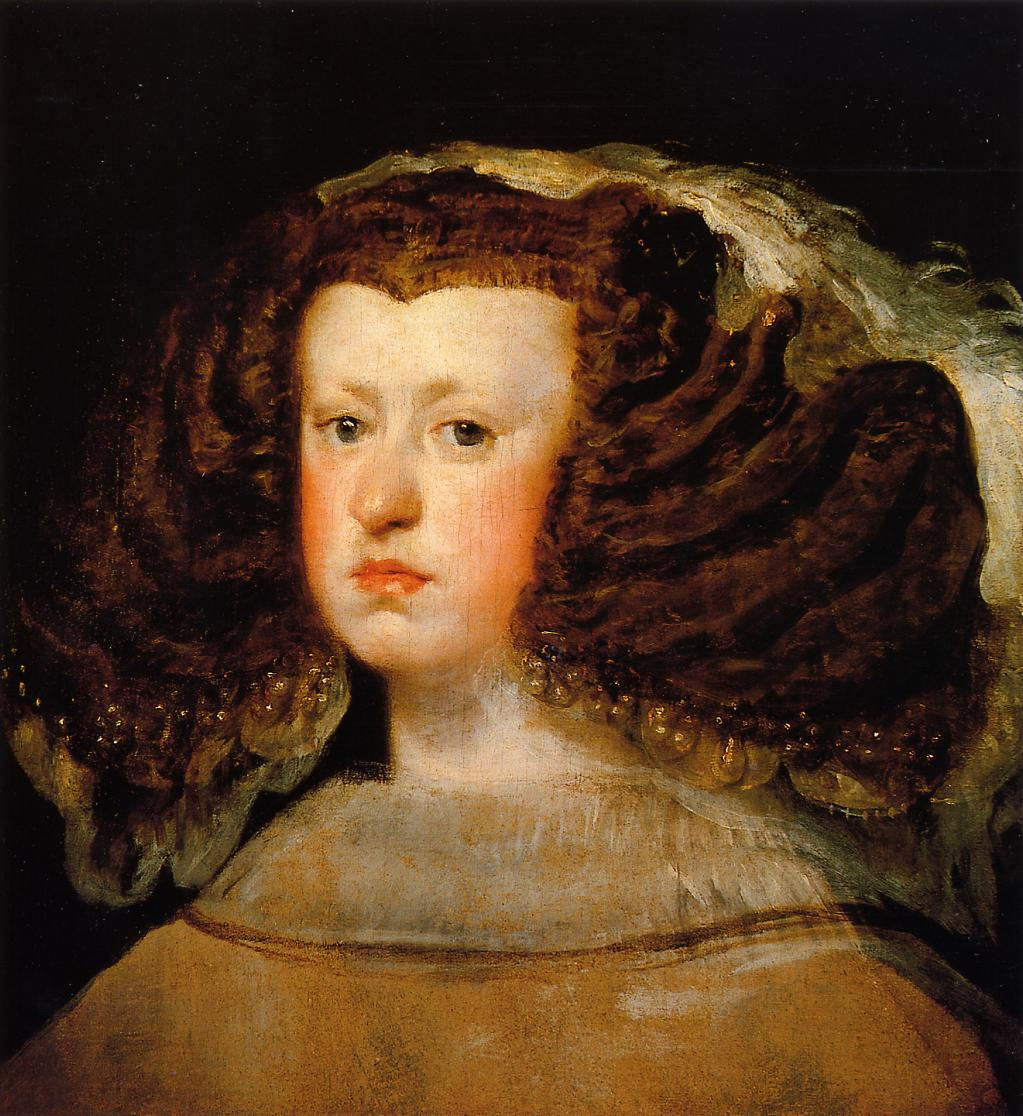
Mariana of Austria by Diego Velázquez, c. 1656

=== First regency: 1665–1677 ===
Charles was three years old when Philip died on 17 September 1665, and Mariana was appointed regent, advised by a Regency Council, until he became a legal adult at the age of 14. She adopted the valido (Note: Translated as Favourite, its true meaning is closer to senior advisor) system established by Philip in 1620, the first being Juan Everardo Nithard, an Austrian Jesuit and her personal confessor; as Philip's will excluded foreigners from the Regency Council, he had to be naturalised, causing immediate resentment. Other informal advisors included Gaspar de Bracamonte, 3rd Count of Peñaranda and Mariana Engracia Álvarez de Toledo Portugal y Alfonso-Pimentel.

Charles' poor health and lack of an heir meant his reign was often dominated by a power struggle between Mariana's Austrian faction, and a pro-French lobby initially led by his illegitimate half-brother, John of Austria the Younger. Spain was also divided into the Crowns of Castile and Aragon, whose very different political cultures made it almost impossible to enact reforms or increase taxes. As a result, government finances were in perpetual crisis, the Crown declaring bankruptcy in 1647, 1652, 1661, and 1666.

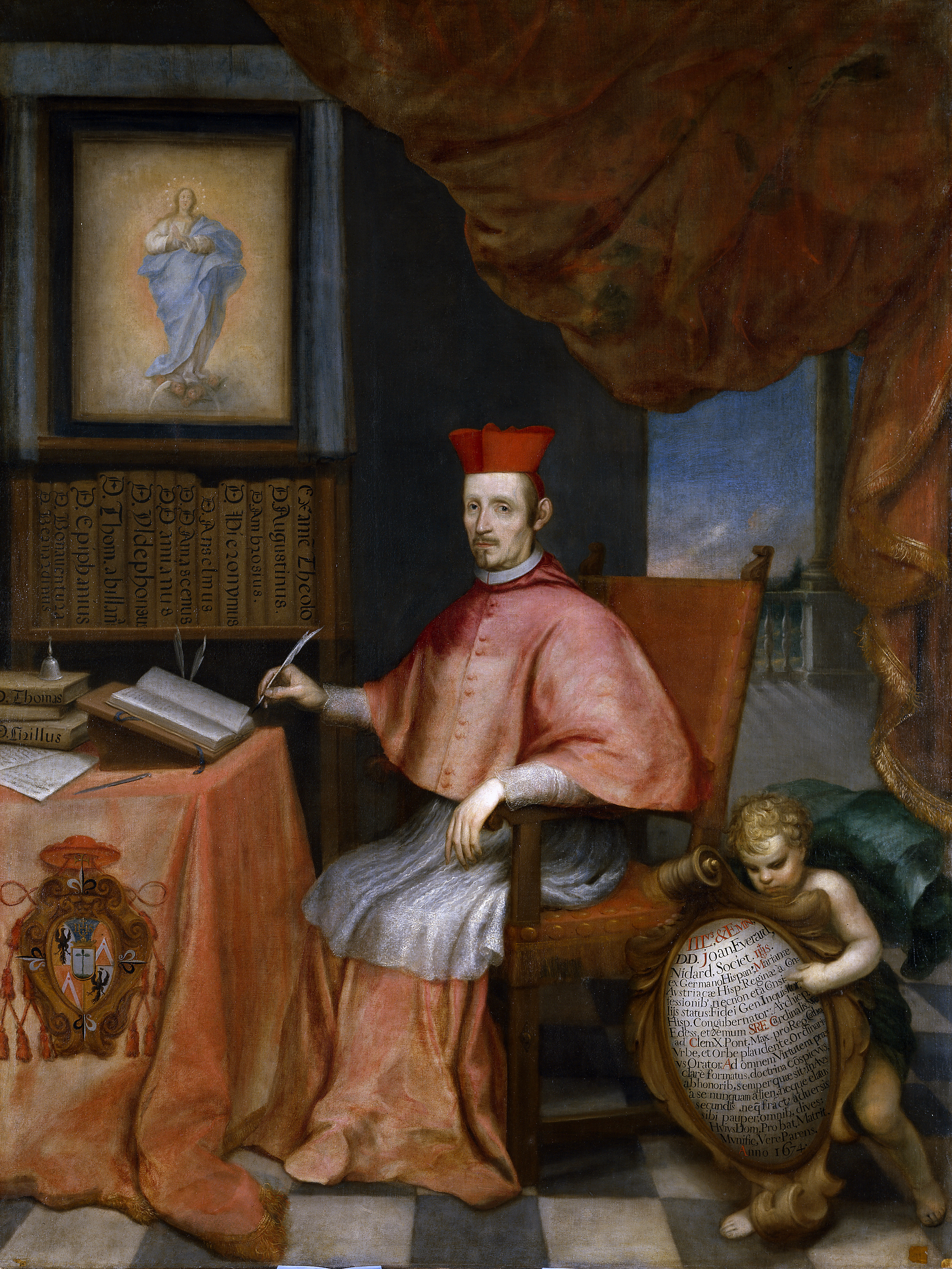
Cardinal Juan Everardo Nithard, c. 1674, Mariana's first advisor until ousted in 1669

Spain was exhausted by almost a century of continuous war, while the second half of the 17th century coincided with a period of extreme cold weather known as the Little Ice Age. Between 1692 and 1699, crops failed across Europe and an estimated 5–10% of the population starved to death. The new government inherited other problems, the long-running Portuguese Restoration War being the most urgent. This was made worse in May 1667 when France once again invaded the Spanish Netherlands, and occupied the Spanish province of Franche-Comté. The Treaty of Aix-la-Chapelle (1668) ended the war with France, while the Treaty of Lisbon (1668) restored Portugal's independence.

Peace ended the drain on Spanish resources, while France returned most of the territories over-run in the War of Devolution. They represented a significant diplomatic achievement, but many Spanish military officers considered the terms humiliating. Joseph Malladas, an Aragonese captain, was executed in June 1668 for plotting to murder Nithard, reputedly on John's behalf. In February 1669, Nithard was succeeded as valido by Aytona, who died in 1670 and was replaced in turn by Valenzuela, a member of her household since 1661. An outsider from the lower ranks of Spanish nobility, Valenzuela depended entirely on Mariana for his position.

In 1672, Spain was dragged into the Franco-Dutch War; Valenzuela was dismissed when Charles came of age in 1675, but Spanish policy continued to be undermined by the struggle for power. Mariana reinstated the regency in 1677 on the grounds of Charles's ill-health and Valenzuela was restored, before John finally gained control in 1677.

=== Second regency: 1679–1696 ===
John died in September 1679 and Mariana became regent once again; one of his final acts was arranging the marriage of Charles to 17-year-old Marie Louise of Orléans, which took place in November 1679. She died in February 1689, without producing an heir; as with many deaths of the period, limited medical knowledge led to allegations she was poisoned. Modern assessments of her symptoms conclude it was almost certainly appendicitis, possibly from the treatments undertaken to improve fertility.

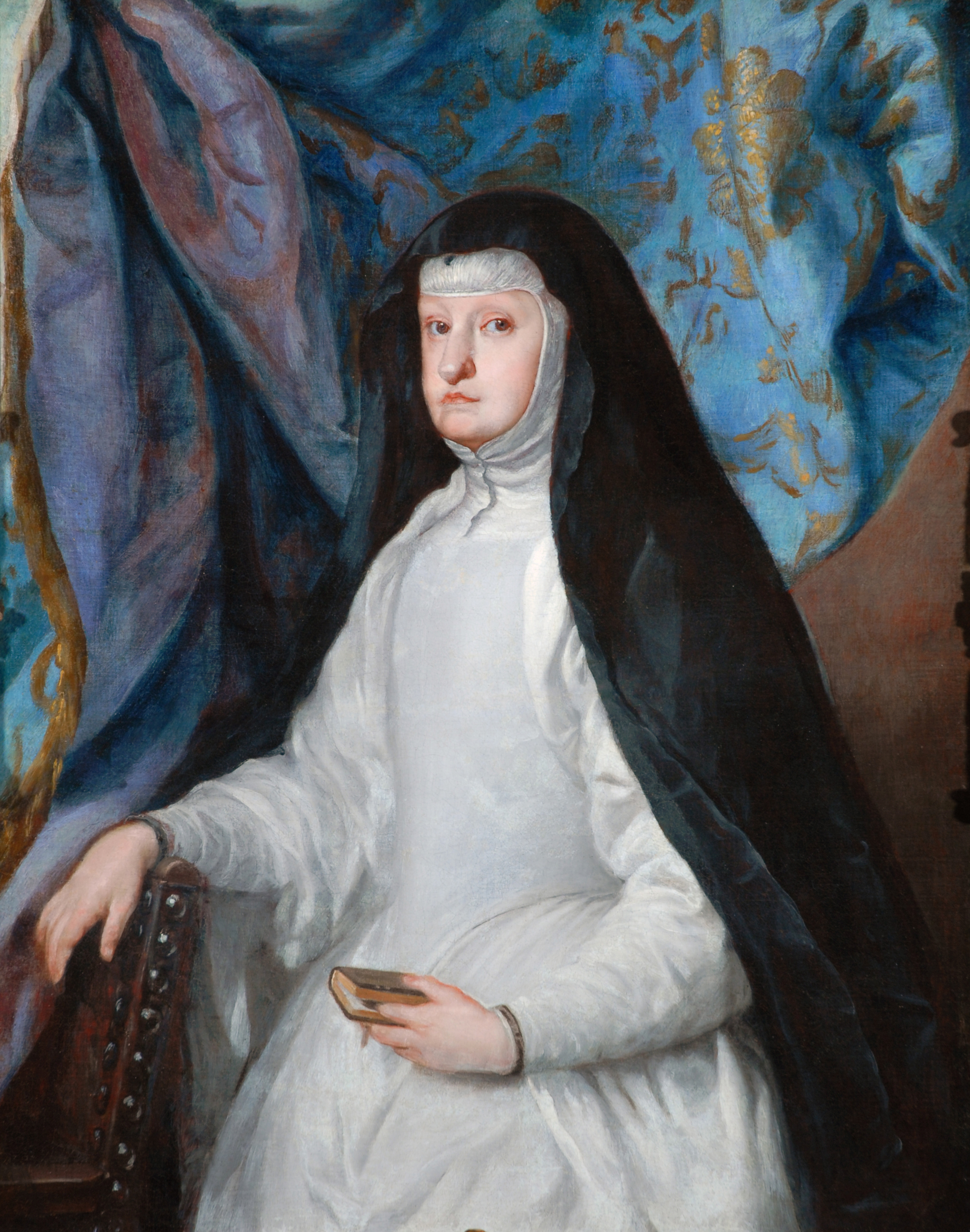
Mariana in her later years, by Claudio Coello, c. 1685–1693

Her replacement was Maria Anna of Neuburg, one of 12 children whose family reputation for fertility made them popular choices for royal marriages. Of her sisters, Maria Sophia married Peter II of Portugal, while Eleonore was the third wife of Leopold I, Holy Roman Emperor. Maria Anna was aunt to future emperors Joseph I and Charles VI, making her an ideal choice for the Austrian faction. However, Charles was by now almost certainly impotent, his autopsy later revealing he had only one, atrophied, testicle.

As his health declined, internal struggles over the succession became increasingly bitter, leadership of the pro-French faction passing to Fernández de Portocarrero, Archbishop of Toledo. In 1690, Spain joined the Grand Alliance in the Nine Years' War with France. It declared bankruptcy again in 1692 and by 1696, France occupied most of Catalonia; Mariana retained power with the support of German auxiliaries under Maria Anna's brother Charles Philip, many of whom were expelled after Mariana's death. She died on 16 May 1696 at the Uceda Palace in Madrid, at the age of sixty-one, probably from breast cancer.

== Legacy ==
In 1668, Mariana approved the establishment of a Jesuit mission under Diego Luis de San Vitores and Saint Pedro Calungsod on a series of islands the Spanish referred to as the Ladrones, which were renamed the Mariana Islands in her honour.

The Portrait of Mariana of Austria painted by Diego Velázquez was commissioned by Philip and is the only known full-length painting of her. The original is in the Prado Museum in Madrid; a copy was sent to her father Ferdinand and is held by the Kunsthistorisches Museum in Vienna. She also appears as a detail in Velázquez's masterpiece Las Meninas, which features her daughter Margaret Theresa.

== Sources ==
- Barton, Simon (2009). A History of Spain. Palgrave. ISBN 978-0-230-20012-8.
- Callaway, Ewen (2013). "Inbred Royals Show Traces of Natural Selection". Nature News. doi:10.1038/nature.2013.12837. S2CID 87959487.
- Cowans, Jon (2003). Modern Spain: A Documentary History. U. of Pennsylvania Press. ISBN 0-8122-1846-9.
- De Vries, Jan (2009). "The Economic Crisis of the 17th Century". Journal of Interdisciplinary Studies. 40 (2).
- Durant, Ariel; Durant, Will (1963). Age of Louis XIV (Story of Civilization). TBS Publishing. ISBN 0-207-94227-7.
- García-Escudero López, Ángel; Arruza Echevarría, A.; Padilla Nieva, Jaime; Puig Giró, Ramon (April 2009). "Carlos II: del hechizo a su patología génito-urinaria" [Charles II; from spell to genitourinary pathology]. Archivos Españoles de Urología (in Spanish). 62 (3): 179–185. doi:10.4321/s0004-06142009000300002. ISSN 0004-0614. PMID 19542589.
- Geyl, P (1936). "Johan de Witt, Grand Pensionary of Holland, 1653–72". History. 20 (80): 303–319. doi:10.1111/j.1468-229X.1936.tb00103.x. JSTOR 24401084.
- Gonzalo, Alvarez; Ceballos, Francisco; Quintero, Celsa (2009). "The Role of Inbreeding in the Extinction of a European Royal Dynasty". PLOS ONE. 4 (4) e5174. Bibcode:2009PLoSO...4.5174A. doi:10.1371/journal.pone.0005174. PMC 2664480. PMID 19367331.
- Graziano, Frank (2004). Wounds of Love: The Mystical Marriage of Saint Rose of Lima. OUP. ISBN 0-19-513640-3.
- Kamen, Henry (2002). Spain's Road to Empire (2003 ed.). Allen Lane. ISBN 978-0-14-028528-4.
- Knighton, Tess (2005). Carreras Lopez, Juan José (ed.). The Royal Chapel in the time of the Habsburgs: Music and Court Ceremony in Early Modern Europe. Boydell Press. ISBN 978-1-84383-139-6.
- Mitchell, Silvia Z (2013). Mariana of Austria and Imperial Spain: Court, Dynastic, and International Politics in Seventeenth- Century Europe. University of Miami Scholarly Repository.
- Mitchell, Silvia Z (2019). Queen, Mother, and Stateswoman: Mariana of Austria and the Government of Spain. Pennsylvania State University Press. ISBN 978-0-271-08339-1.
- O'Connor, John T. (1978). Negotiator out of Season. University of Georgia Press. ISBN 0-8203-0436-0.
- Rommelse, Gijs (2011). Ideology and Foreign Policy in Early Modern Europe (1650–1750). Routledge. ISBN 978-1-4094-1913-6.
- Rule, John (2017). Onnekink, David; Mijers, Esther (eds.). The Partition Treaties, 1698-1700; A European View in Redefining William III: The Impact of the King-Stadholder in International Context. Routledge. ISBN 978-1-138-25796-2.
- Stolicka, Ondrej. Different German Perspectives on Spanish Politics in the 1670s: The Reaction of Vienna and Berlin on the Coup of Juan José de Austria in the Year 1677, JEHM 23(4), 2019, pp. 367–385. https://doi.org/10.1163/15700658-00002638
- Storrs, Christopher (2006). The Resilience of the Spanish Monarchy 1665–1700. OUP Oxford. ISBN 0-19-924637-8.

== Family tree ==
Ancestors of Mariana of Austria

Philip I of Castile (Note: Charles V, Holy Roman Emperor at the Encyclopædia Britannica); 1478–1506	Joanna of Castile; 1479–1555
Isabella of Portugal; 1503–39	Charles V Holy Roman Emperor; 1500–58	Ferdinand I Holy Roman Emperor (Note: Press, Volker (1990). "Maximilian II.". Neue Deutsche Biographie (in German). Vol. 16. Berlin: Duncker & Humblot. pp. 471–475. (full text online).); 1503–64	Anna of Bohemia and Hungary; 1503–47	Isabella of Austria; 1501–26	Christian II of Denmark; 1481–1559
Maria of Spain; 1528–1603	Maximilian II; Holy Roman Emperor; 1527–76	Anna of Austria; 1528–90	Albert V Duke of Bavaria; 1528–1579	Christina of Denmark; 1522–90	Francis I Duke of Lorraine; 1517–45
Philip II of Spain; 1527–98	Anna of Austria; 1549–80	Charles II; Archduke of Austria (Note: Eder, Karl (1961). "Ferdinand II.". Neue Deutsche Biographie (in German). Vol. 5. Berlin: Duncker & Humblot. pp. 83–85. (full text online).); 1540–90	Maria Anna of Bavaria; 1551–1608	William V Duke of Bavaria; 1548–1626	Renata of Lorraine; 1544–1602
Philip III of Spain; 1578–1621	Margaret of Austria; 1584–1611	Ferdinand II; Holy Roman Emperor; 1578–1637	Maria Anna of Bavaria; 1574–1616
Maria Anna of Spain; 1606–46	Ferdinand III; Holy Roman Emperor; 1608–57
Philip IV of Spain; 1605–65	Mariana of Austria; 1634–96

Notes:

Mariana of Austria House of Habsburg Born: 23 December 1634 Died: 16 May 1696
Spanish royalty
Vacant Title last held by Elisabeth of France	Queen consort of Spain; 7 October 1649 – 17 September 1665	Vacant Title next held by Marie Louise d'Orléans
