= Prince Philip Prospero =

1659 painting by Diego Velázquez

Philip Prospero, or The Infante Philip Prospero
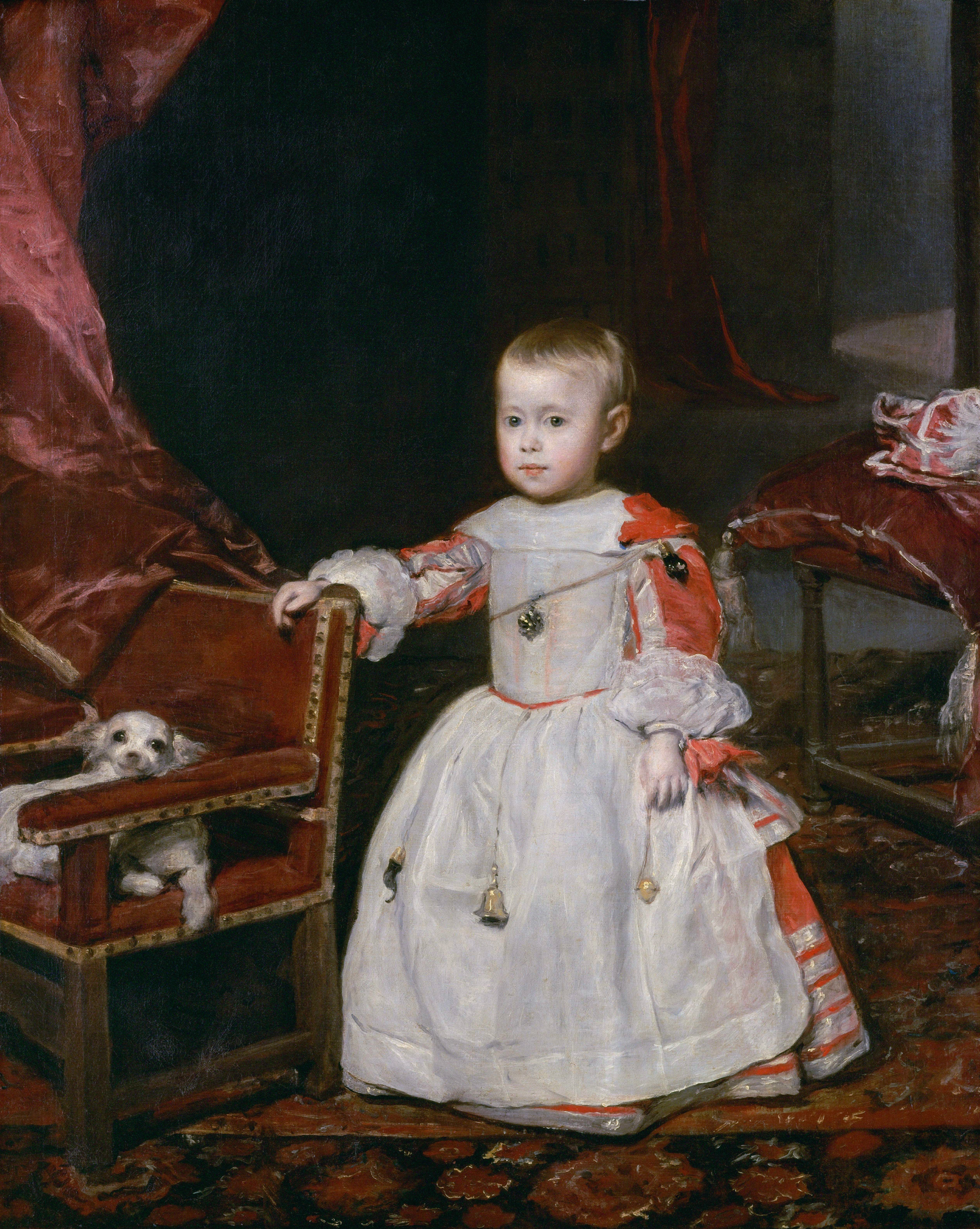
- Artist: Diego Velázquez
- Year: 1659
- Medium: Oil on canvas
- Dimensions: 128.5 cm × 99.5 cm (50.6 in × 39.2 in)
- Location: Kunsthistorisches Museum; Vienna

Prince Philip Prospero (Spanish: El príncipe Felipe Próspero) is an oil on canvas portrait by Diego Velázquez of Philip Prospero, Prince of Asturias, from 1659. It is held in the Kunsthistorisches Museum, in Vienna.

== History and description ==
The painting depicts Philip Prospero, Prince of Asturias (Madrid, November 20, 1657 - Madrid, November 1, 1661), the short lived heir to the Spanish crown, who died at only 3 years old. He was the third son and the first from the marriage of Philip IV of Spain and Mariana of Austria.

In this portrait, the child is standing, he wears a dress typical of toddlers, while he rests his right arm on an armchair, which seems to grant him more compassion than majesty, since his health was precarious as evidenced by the amulets that he carries. On the chair, at the left, there is a lapdog, whose watery look accentuates the melancholy of the scene.

The subject of the painting is located in a room, and in the background there is an open door through which light enters. To the right there is a stool with a cushion on which a hat is placed. Red tones predominate in the work and the dark tones of the background increase the contrast between the colors.

== See also ==
- List of works by Diego Velázquez
