= The Martyrdom of Saint Catherine (Guercino) =

Painting by Guercino

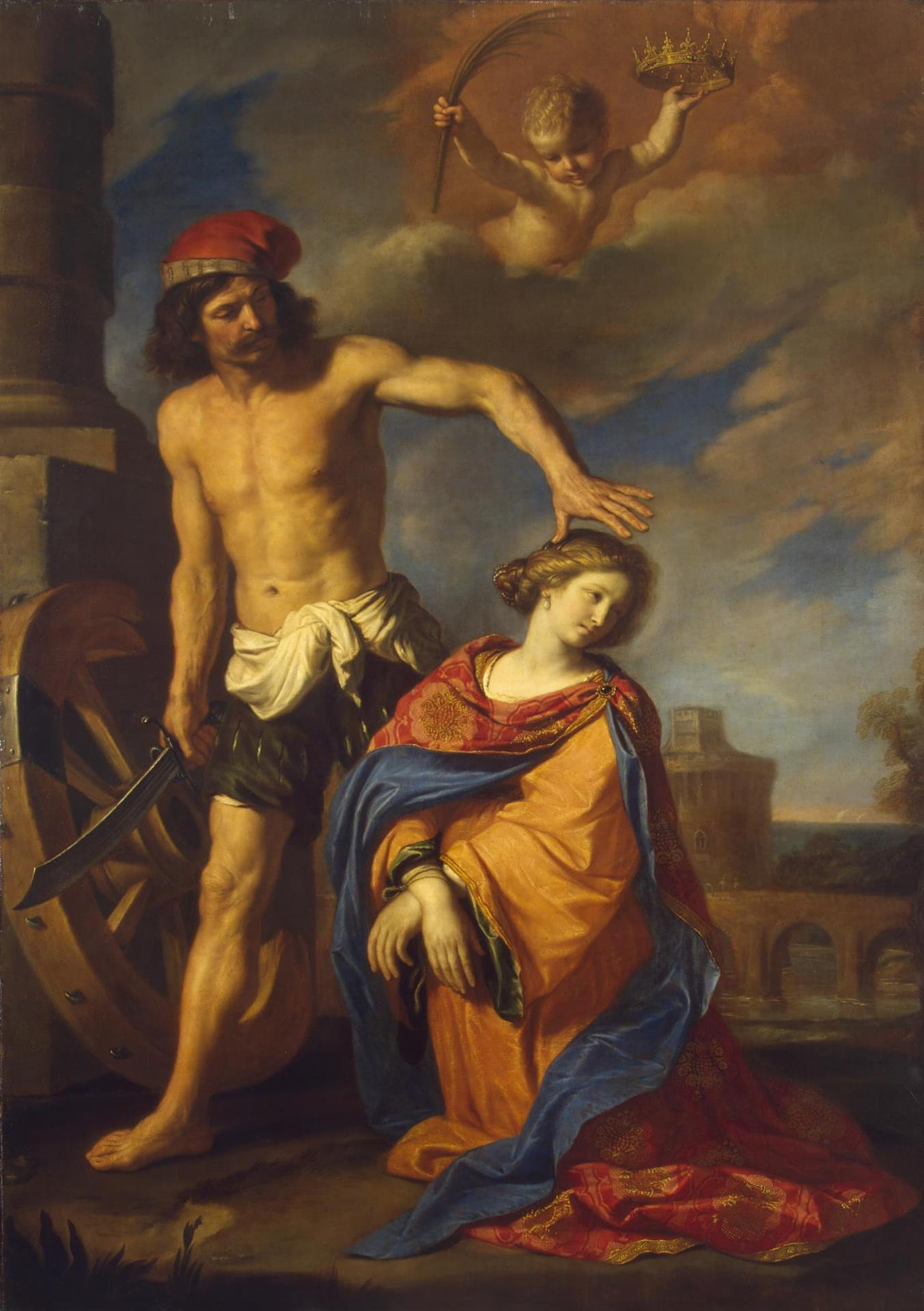
The Martyrdom of Saint Catherine (1653) by Guercino

The Martyrdom of Saint Catherine is a 1653 oil on canvas painting by Guercino, commissioned by Cento to present to Cardinal Alderano Cibo, papal legate in Ferrara.

== History ==
Two preparatory drawings by Guercino for this painting are known. The first drawing corresponds compositionally with some changes to the Hermitage painting; on the back of the sheet there is a separate figure of the executioner. This drawing is in a private collection in London, England. The Museum of Fine Arts in Boston has a drawing that repeats the drawing from London, it has an indication that Francesco Bartolozzi made an engraving from it, but this work itself is unknown or its prints have not been preserved.

In the church of San Francesco in Monteluco there is a small copy of this painting by Ercole Gennari (46 by 35 cm); in all likelihood, the copy was made in the workshop of Guercino, who was once a student of Ercole Gennari's father Benedetto Gennari the Elder and maintained relations with his teacher's family until the end of his life. Ercole himself was married to Guercino's sister Lucia.

The painting was in Ferrara for a long time, then for a long time its whereabouts where unknown. It resurfaced once again in the first half of the 19th century in London, where it was in the possession of the British merchant G. Farrer, from whom it was acquired by King William II of the Netherlands. It was bought at the posthumous sale of the collection of William II by Nicholas I of Russia in 1850 and since then has been in the Hermitage Museum in Saint Petersburg.

== Description ==
The painting illustrates an episode described in the Golden Legend: the execution of the martyr Catherine of Alexandria. Catherine is depicted on her knees with her hands tied; next to her, a half-naked executioner with a sword in his hand grabs Catherine by the hair with the intention of cutting off her head. To the left behind the executioner is one of the four spiked wheels, which were originally supposed to crush the body of the martyr - this device was destroyed by an angel. The angel himself is depicted as a putto, holding a crown in his left hand and a palm branch in his right - according to the Golden Legend, these items are attributes of Catherine.
