= The Infanta Maria Theresa of Spain =

Painting by Diego Velázquez

The infanta Maria Theresa of Spain or The infanta Maria Theresa aged 14
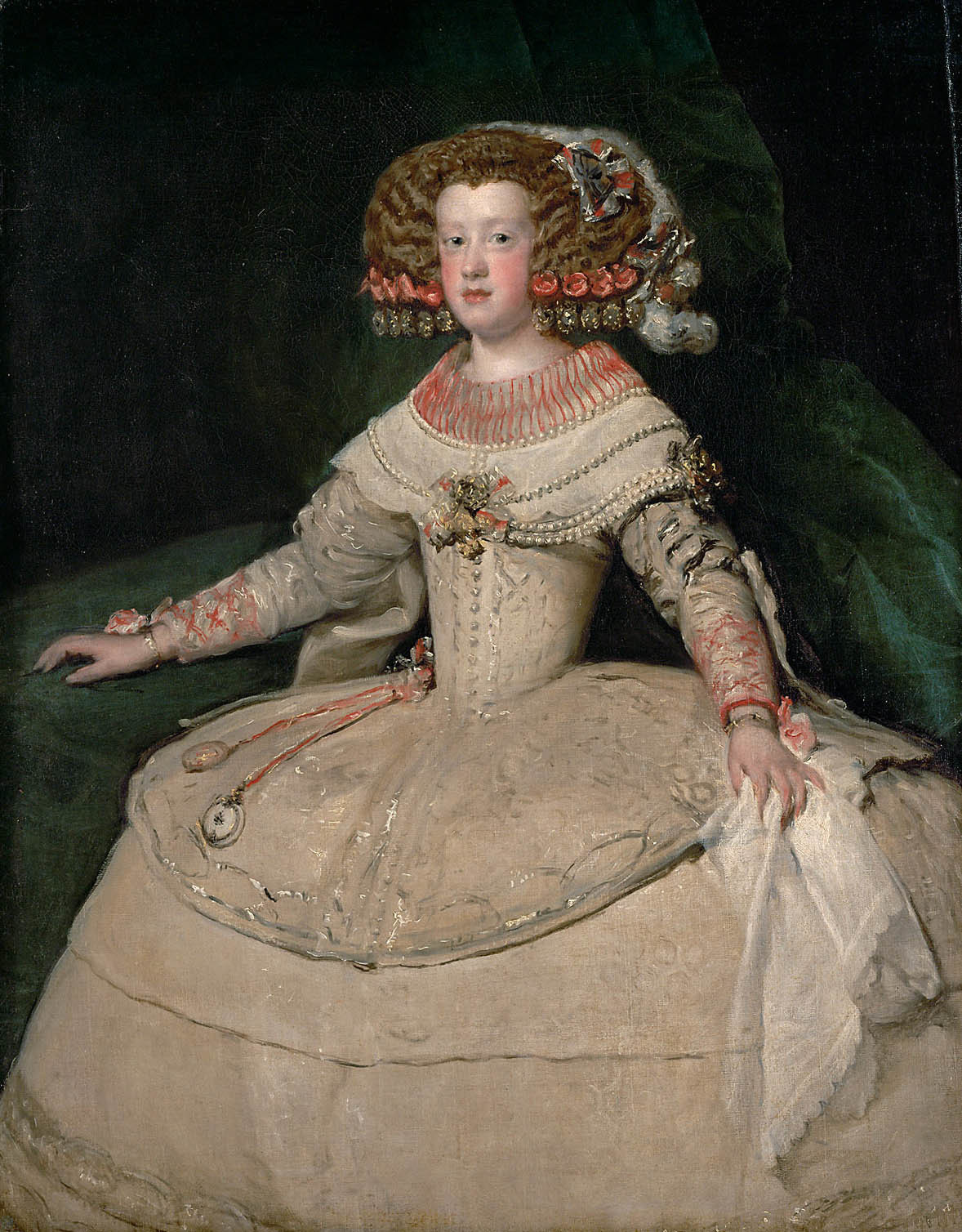
- Artist: Diego Velázquez
- Year: 1652-1653
- Medium: Oil on canvas
- Dimensions: 127 cm × 98.5 cm (50 in × 38.8 in)
- Location: Kunsthistorisches Museum; Vienna

The Infanta Maria Theresa of Spain or The Infanta Maria Theresa aged 14 is a portrait by Diego Velázquez of Maria Theresa of Spain, from 1653, when she was about thirteen years. It has been cut down at the top and bottom and is now in the Kunsthistorisches Museum in Vienna.

It is considered one of the strongest of the artist's late portraits, showing its subject in a majestic pose, illuminated in a light dress against a dark background. Its seriousness and formality is added to by the two watches she carries, whilst the handkerchief in her left hand is one of the painting's highlights.

Velázquez and his assistants created three paintings to be sent to potential husbands for the Infanta (who eventually married Louis XIV). Two other versions are on display in the Museum of Fine Arts, Boston and the Louvre.

== See also ==
- List of works by Diego Velázquez

== Sources ==
- Museo del Prado. Pintura española de los siglos XVI y XVII. Enrique Lafuente Ferrari. Aguilar S.A. 1964
- Gállego, Julián. Velázquez. New York: Metropolitan Museum of Art; H.N. Abrams, 1989
